= VR Class Hr1 =

Finnish steam locomotive

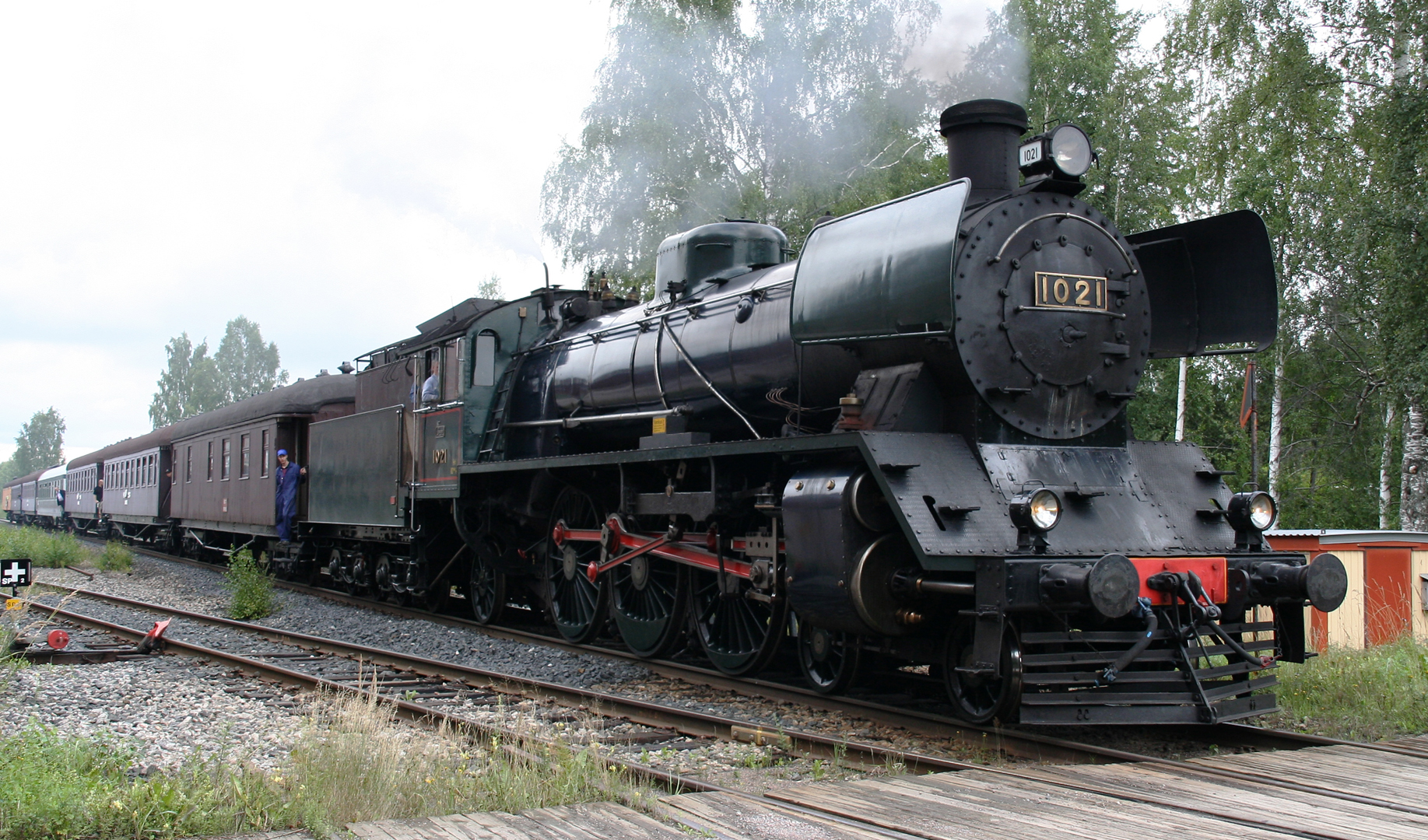
- Hr1 1021 with Witte-type smoke deflectors
Type and origin
- Power type: Steam
- Builder: Lokomo Oy and Tampella Oy
- Build date: 1937–1957
- Total produced: 22
Specifications
- Configuration
  - AAR: 4-6-2
- Gauge: 1,524 mm (5 ft)
- Driver dia.: 1,900 mm (6 ft 3 in)
- Length: 22.2 m (72 ft 10 in)
- Loco weight: 155 tonnes (153 long tons; 171 short tons) with tender
- Boiler pressure: 15 bar (1,500 kPa; 220 psi)
- Cylinders: Two, outside
- Valve gear: Walschaerts
Performance figures
- Maximum speed: 110 km/h (68 mph)
- Tractive effort: 114 kN (25,630 lbf)
Career
- Operators: VR
- First run: 1937
- Withdrawn: 1972 returned to service due to oil crisis withdrawn in 1974
- Disposition: six scrapped, remainder preserved

The Hr1 class (original classification P1) was the largest passenger express steam locomotive built in Finland. Twenty-two were built between the years 1937–1957. They were numbered 1000–1021.

In the 1930s, there was a need for faster and heavier express trains in Finland, and the Hv1–Hv3 classes were not powerful enough to fill the need. Lokomo Oy in Tampere built first two prototypes, and after successful trials 20 more were built. Most of the locomotives were fitted with Wagner-type smoke deflectors, but the last two, which were equipped with roller bearings, had Witte-type deflectors.

The class's nickname was "Ukko-Pekka", meaning approximately "(respected) Grandpa Pekka", after the President of Finland Pehr Evind Svinhufvud.

The Hr1 was built for coal firing, but during the coal shortage after the war in 1945, birch wood was used as fuel. Larger chimneys needed for extinguishing wood sparks were temporarily fitted.

The Hr1s were the most important express steam locomotive and could justifiably be called the "flagships" of VR until 1963, when diesel locomotives started to replace steam. Their use ended officially in 1971, but two Hr1s equipped with roller bearings were brought back to use for a short time in the spring of 1974. One engine, 1005, was a participant in the worst peacetime railroad accident in Finland, the Kuurila accident, in 1957. The engine is preserved at Haapamäki.

Hr1's sister locomotive was the Tr1 class, otherwise similar, but with 2-8-2 wheel arrangement and smaller diameter drivers for freight train use.

== Preservation ==
The following are preserved:

- 1000 Haapamäki
- 1001 Hyvinkää
- 1002–1005 Haapamäki, 1003 sectioned to show the inside of a steam locomotive
- 1008 Epping Ongar Railway
- 1009 Kouvola
- 1010 Haapamäki
- 1011 Otanmäki
- 1012 Oulainen
- 1014 Haapamäki
- 1016 named "Lady Patricia" on a Private Railway near Windsor, Berkshire, United Kingdom
- 1019, 1020 Haapamäki
- 1021 Riihimäki

== Gallery ==
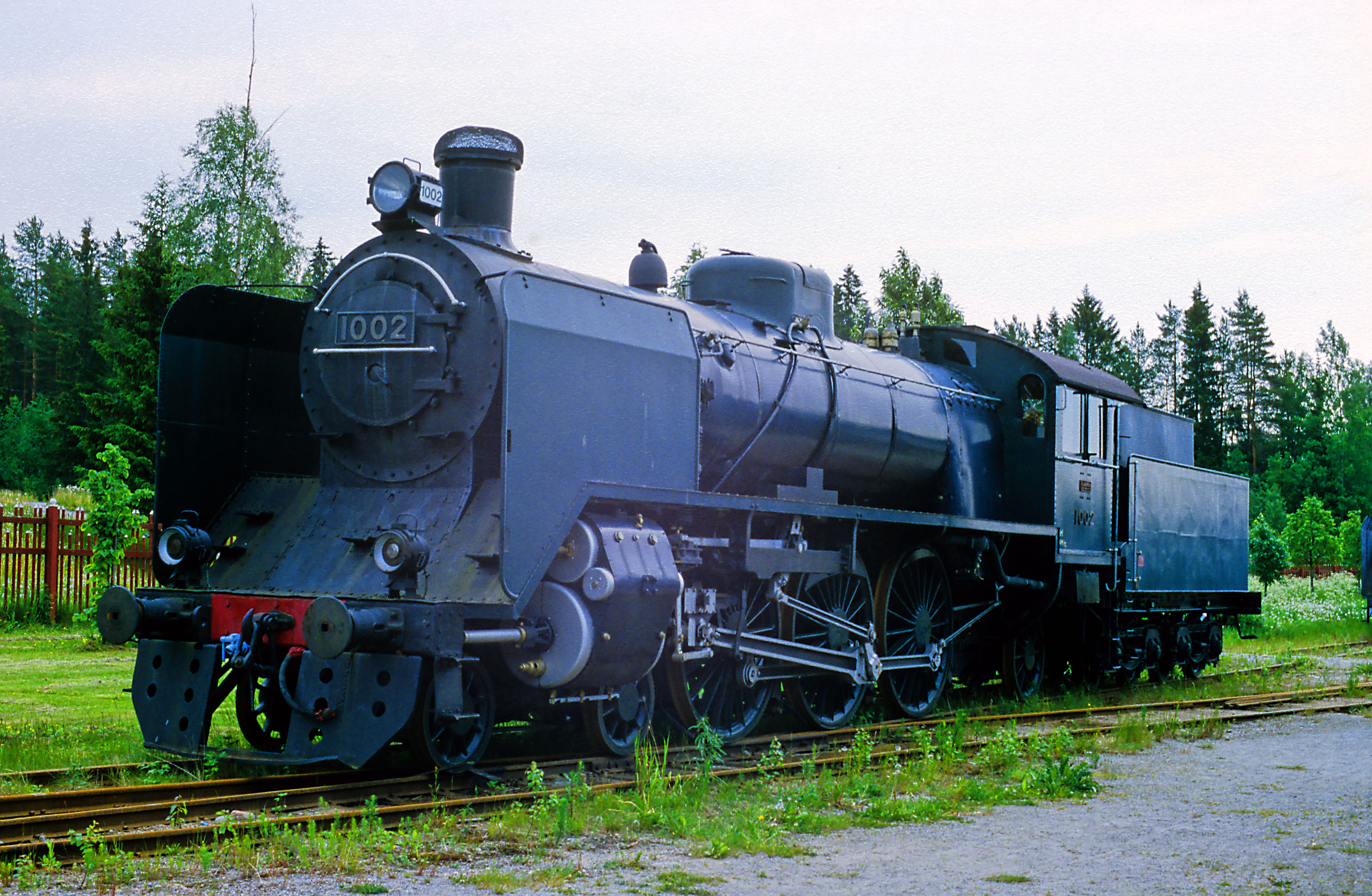
Hr1 1002 at Haapamäki

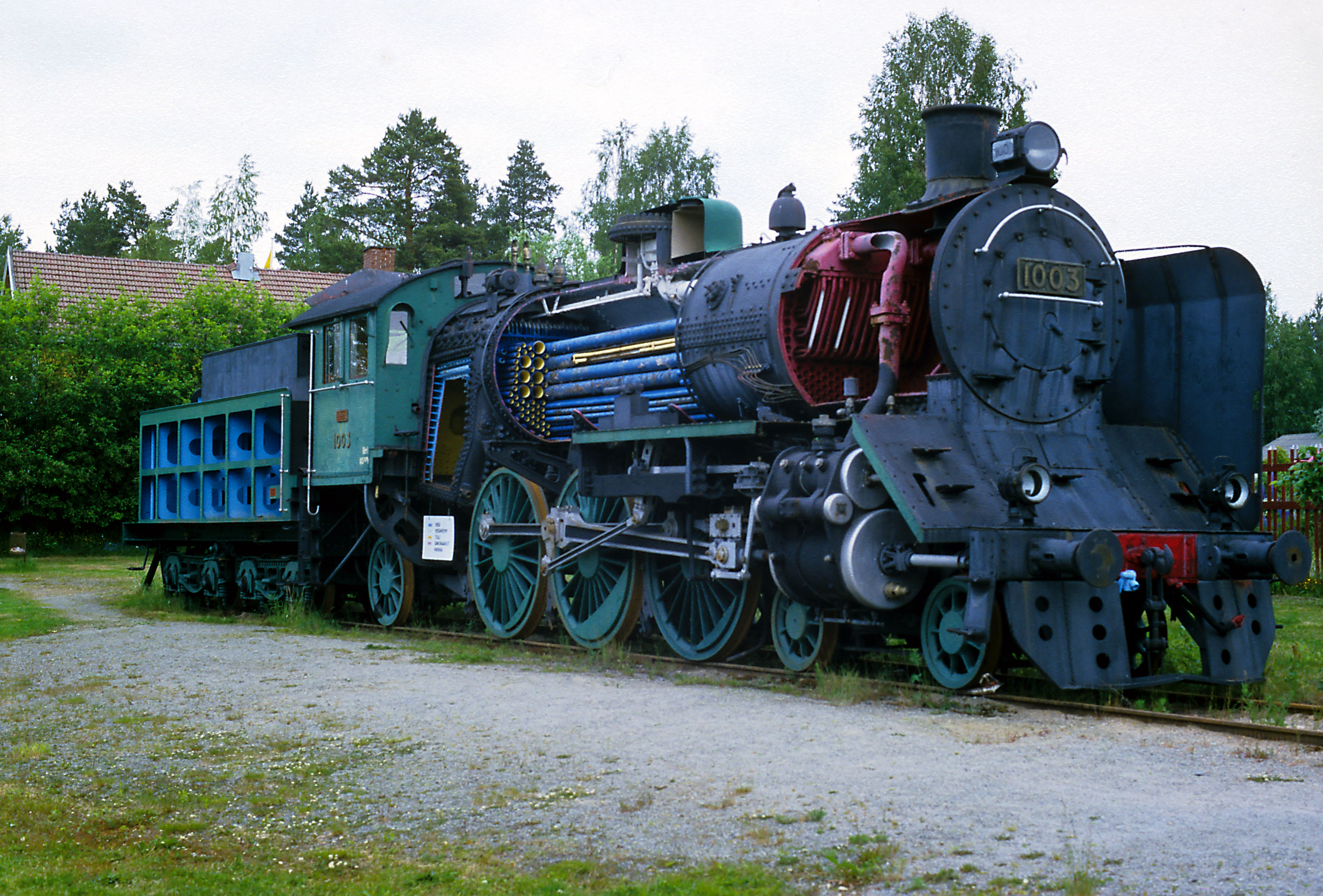
Hr1 1003 at Haapamäki

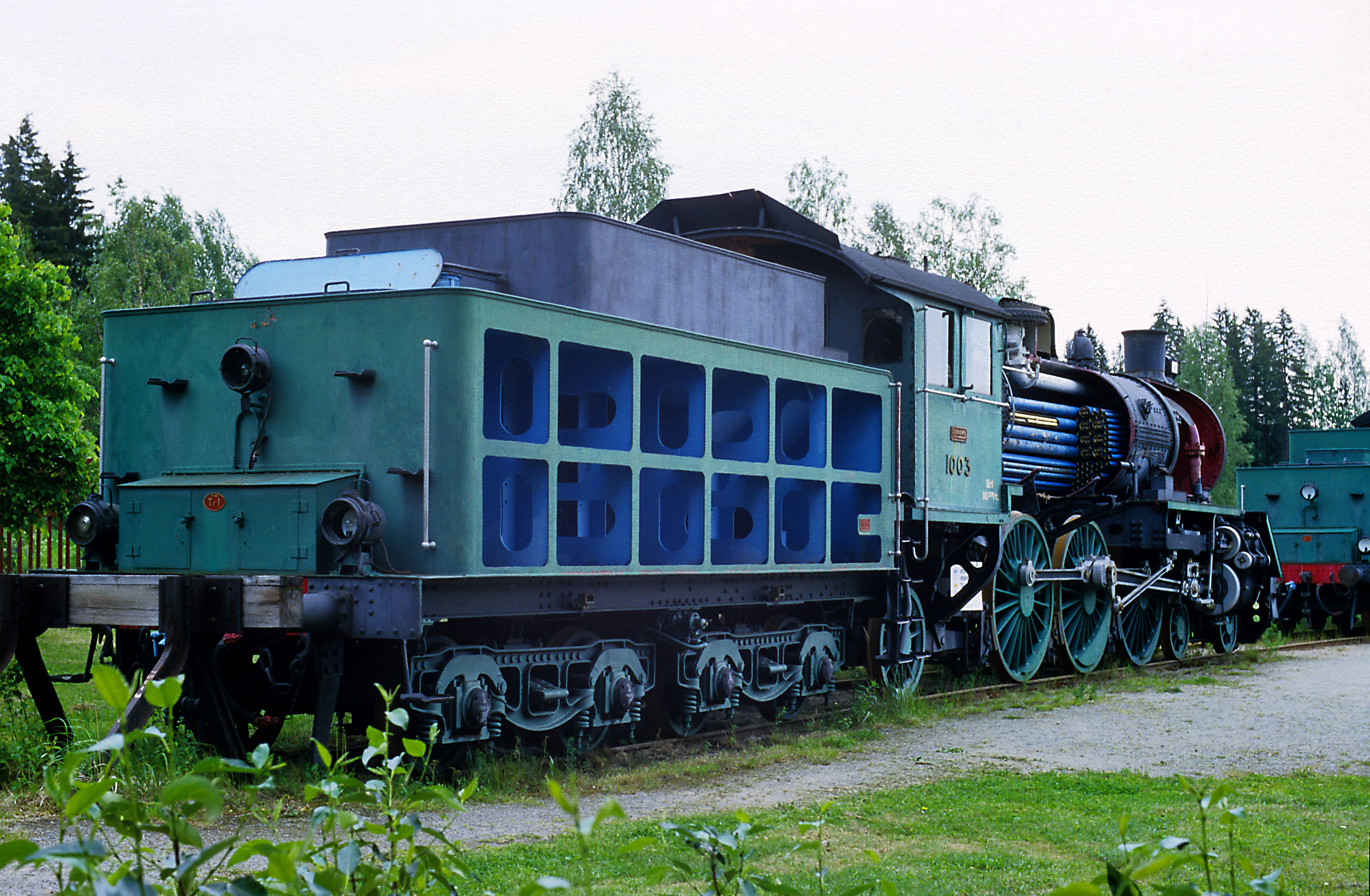
Hr1 1003 at Haapamäki

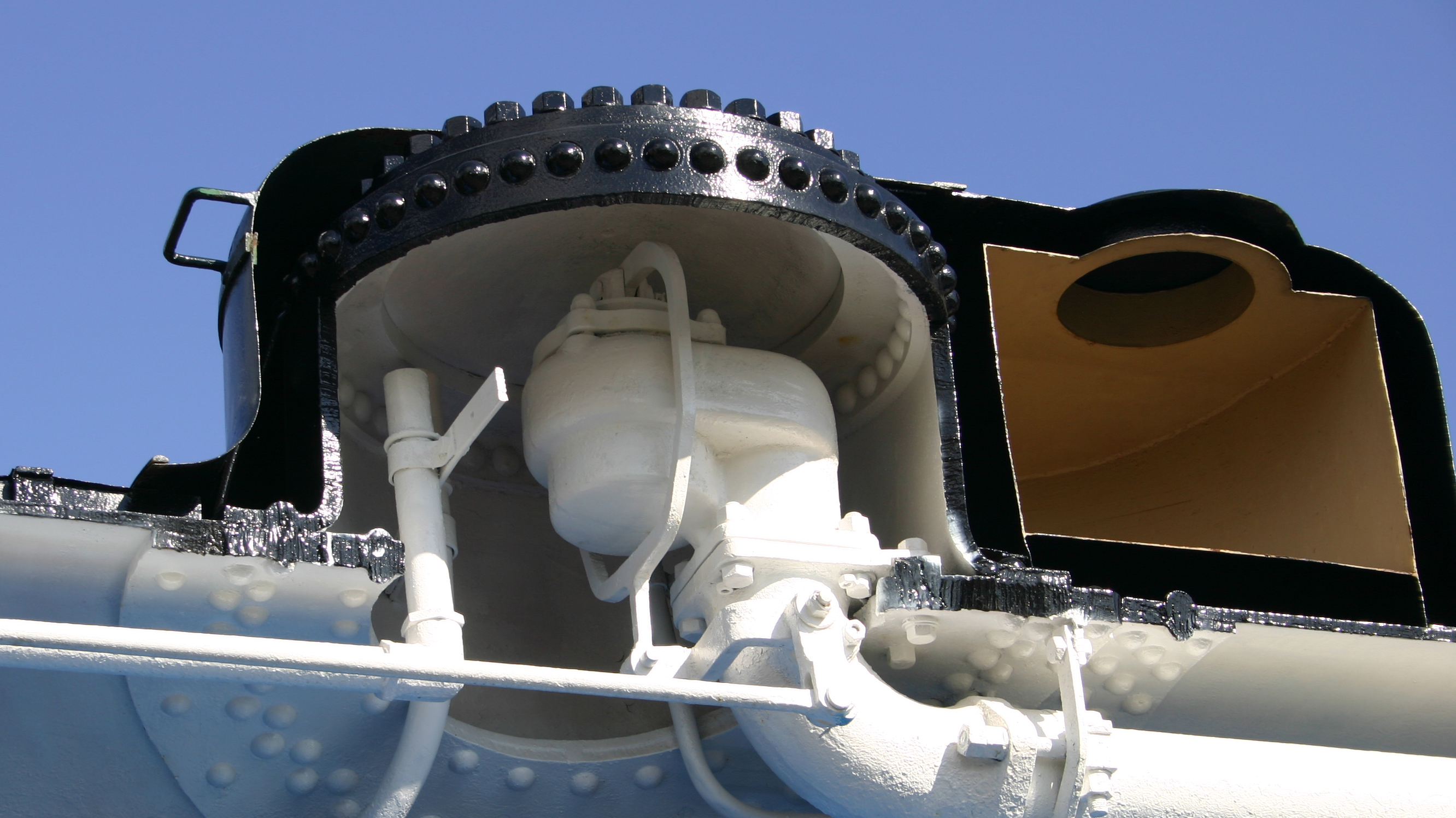
Hr1 1003 at Haapamäki

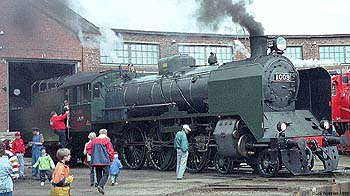
Finnish Hr1 class 4-6-2 steam locomotive No 1009 at Pasila

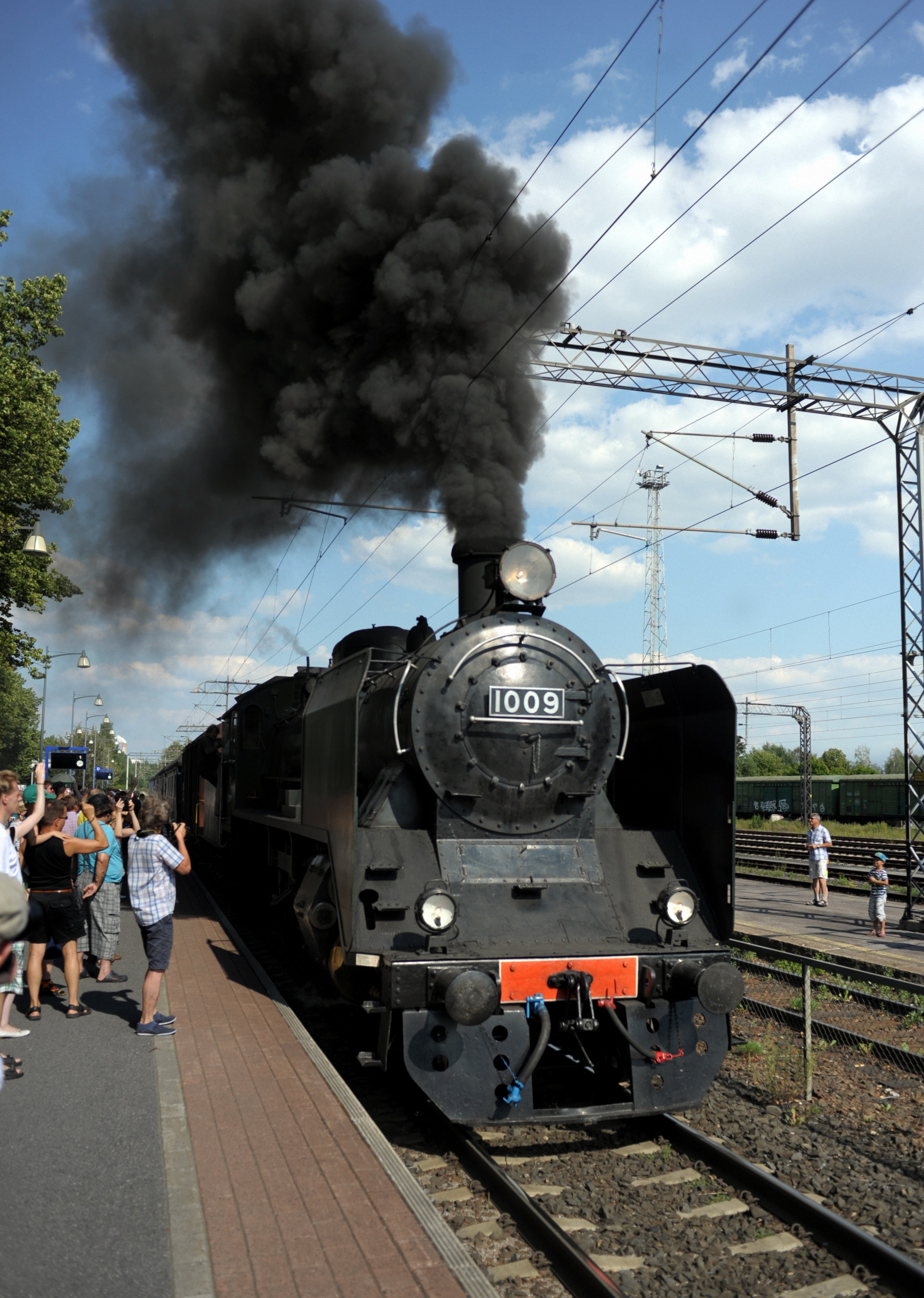
Hr1 1009 at Lappeenranta

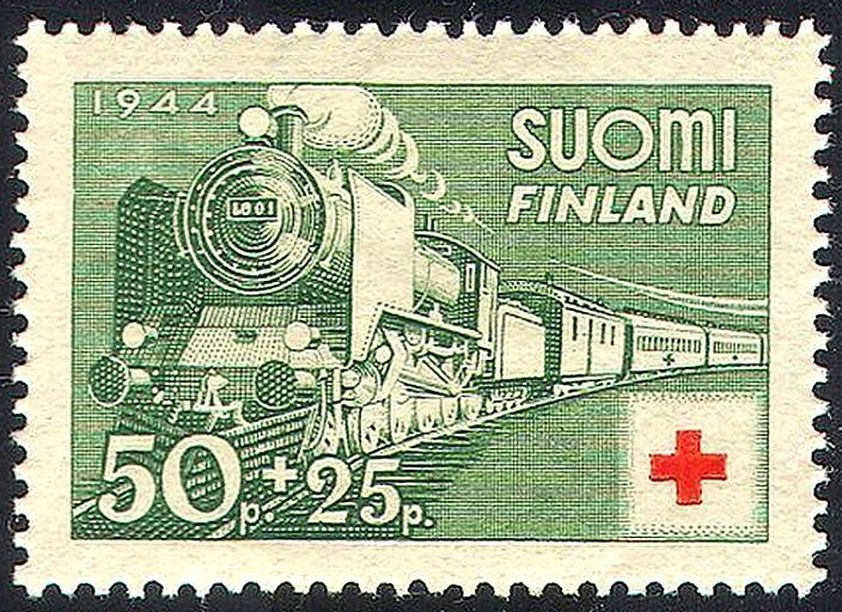
A 1944 Postage stamp depicting a Finnish train with a steam locomotive; the nickname of this heavy locomotive was "Ukko-Pekka"

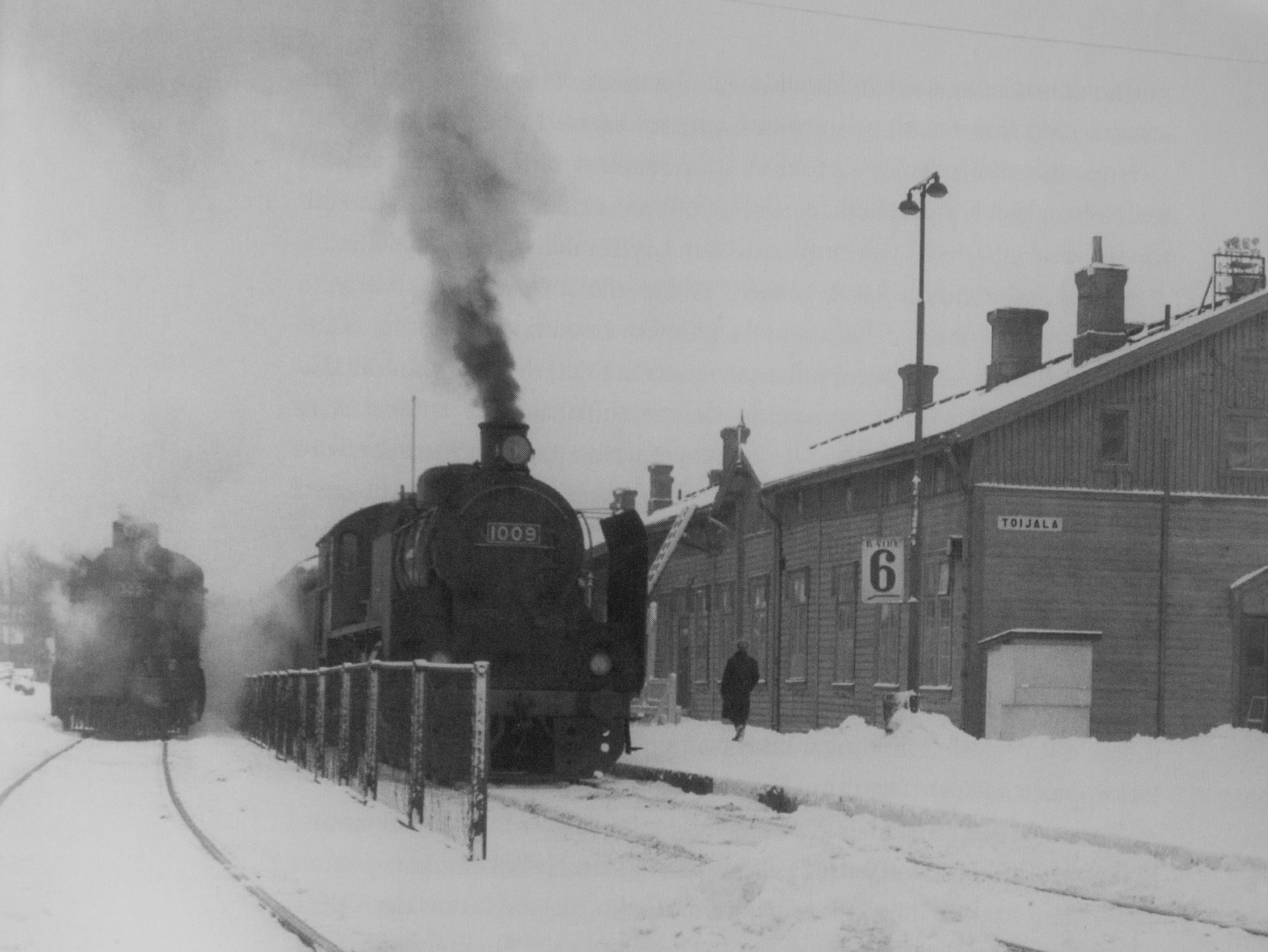
Hr1 1009 at Toijala railway station 1953

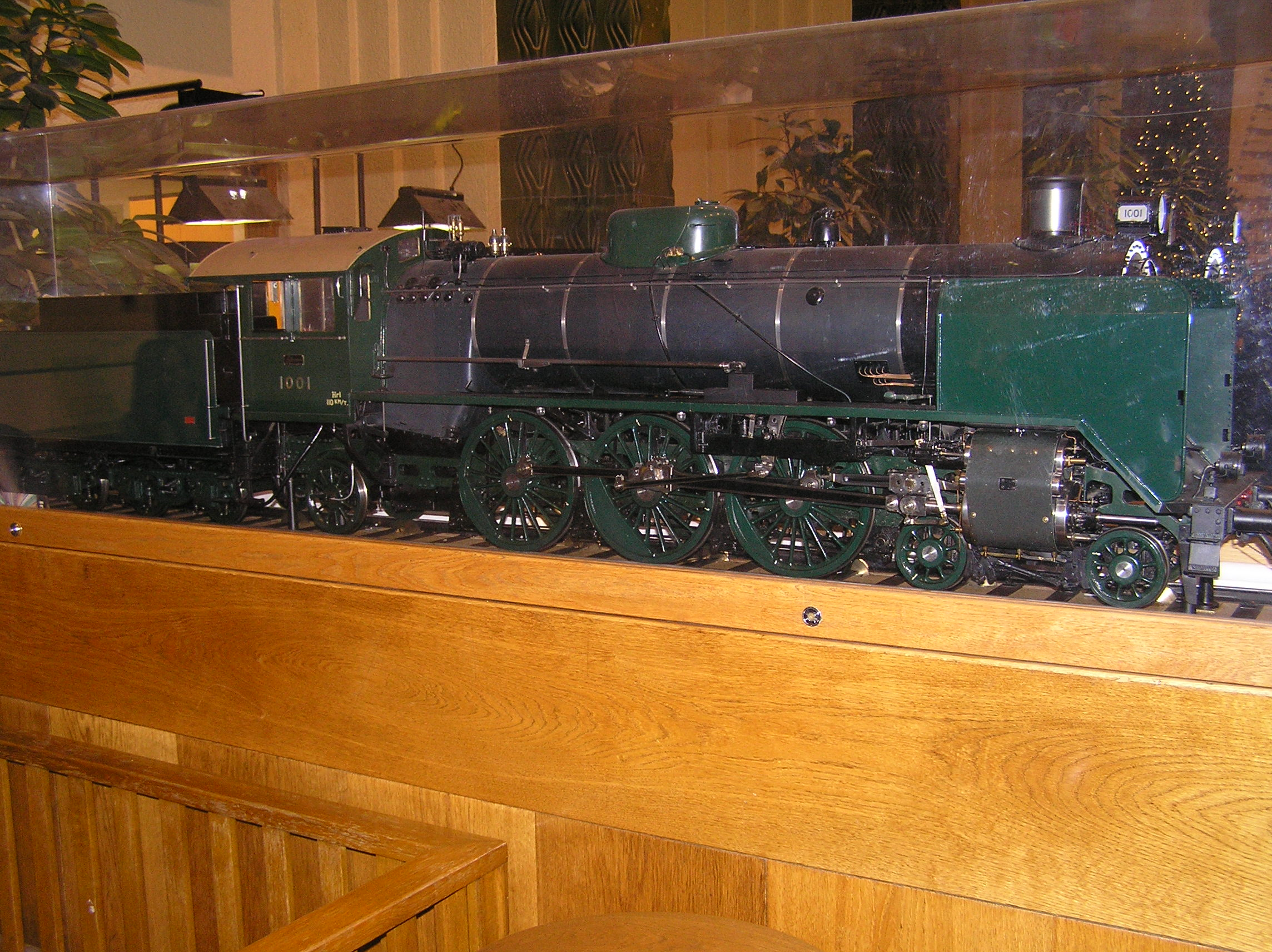
Scale 1:10 model of VR Class Hr1 1001 in the ticket hall of Helsinki Central Station

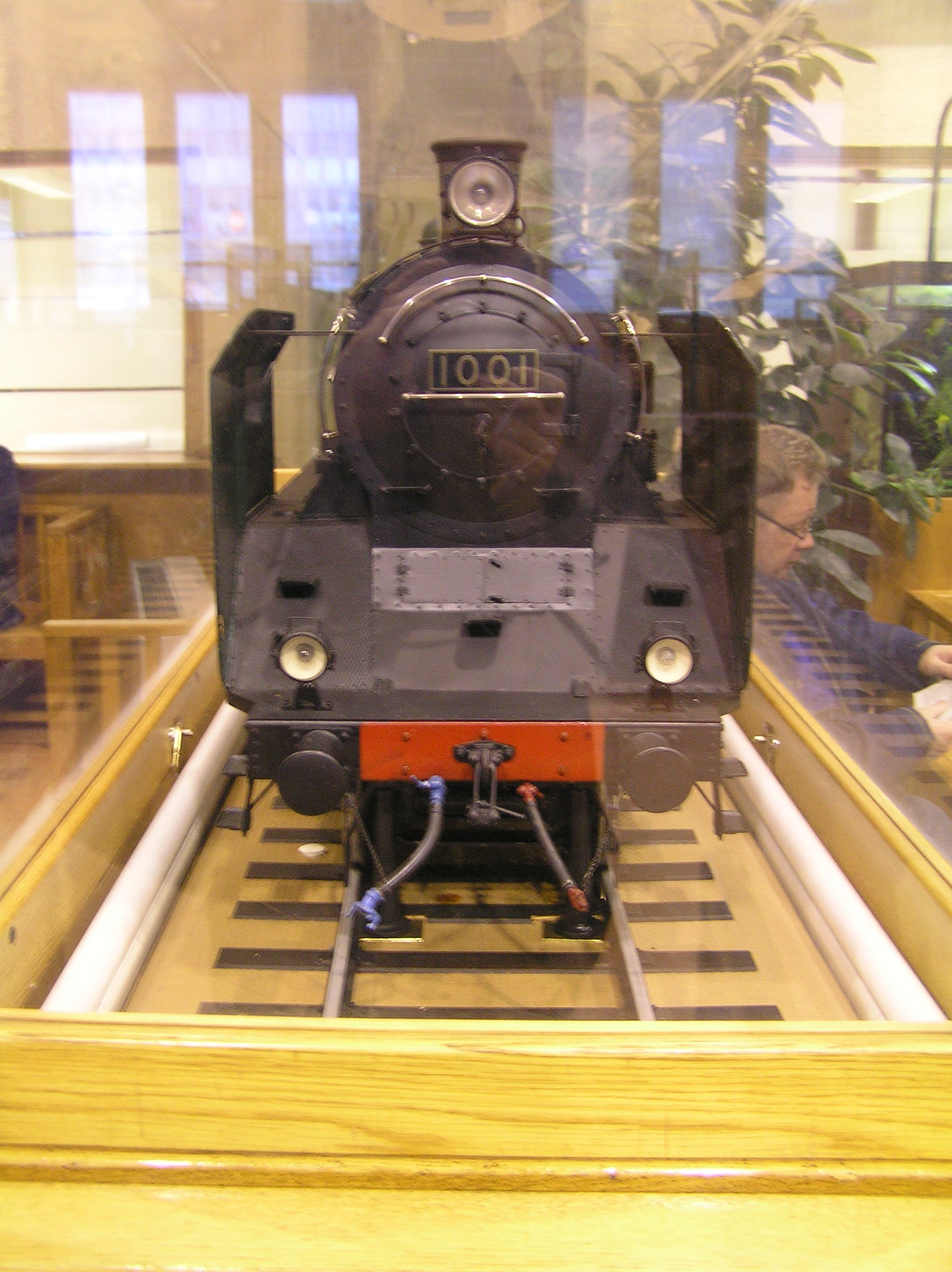
Scale 1:10 model of VR Class Hr1 1001 in the ticket hall of Helsinki Central Station

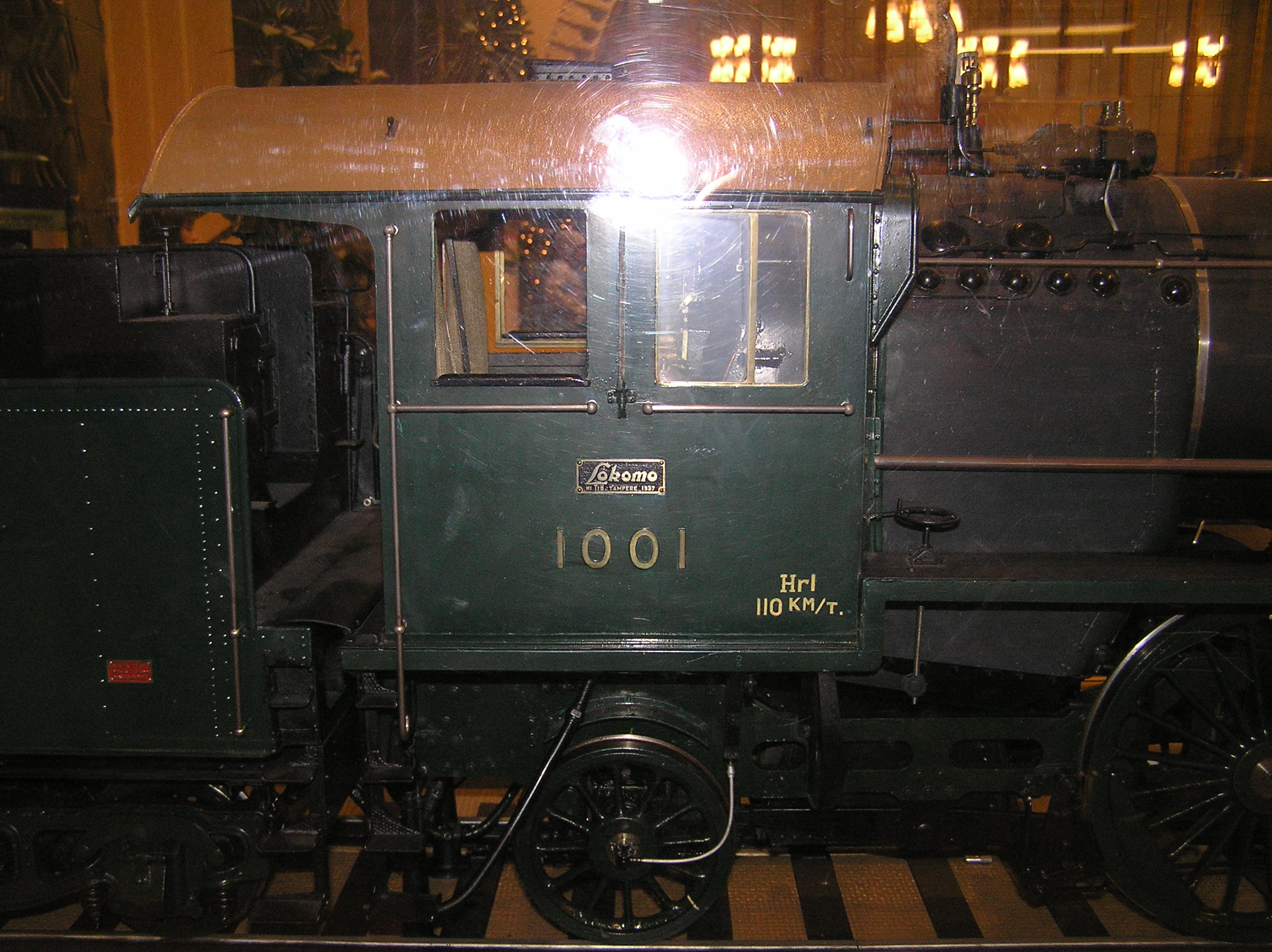
Scale 1:10 model of VR Class Hr1 1001 in the ticket hall of Helsinki Central Station

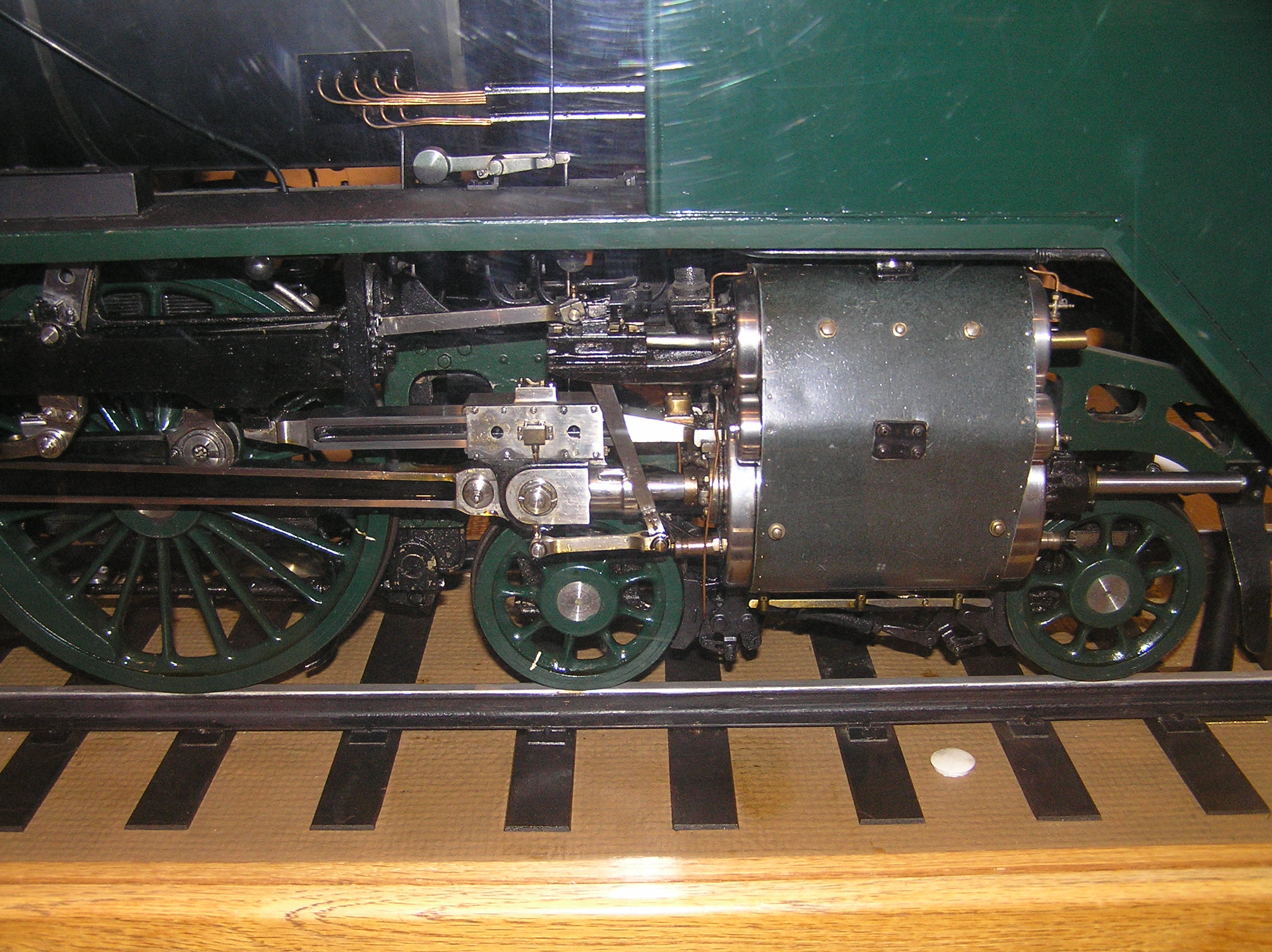
Scale 1:10 model of VR Class Hr1 1001 in the ticket hall of Helsinki Central Station

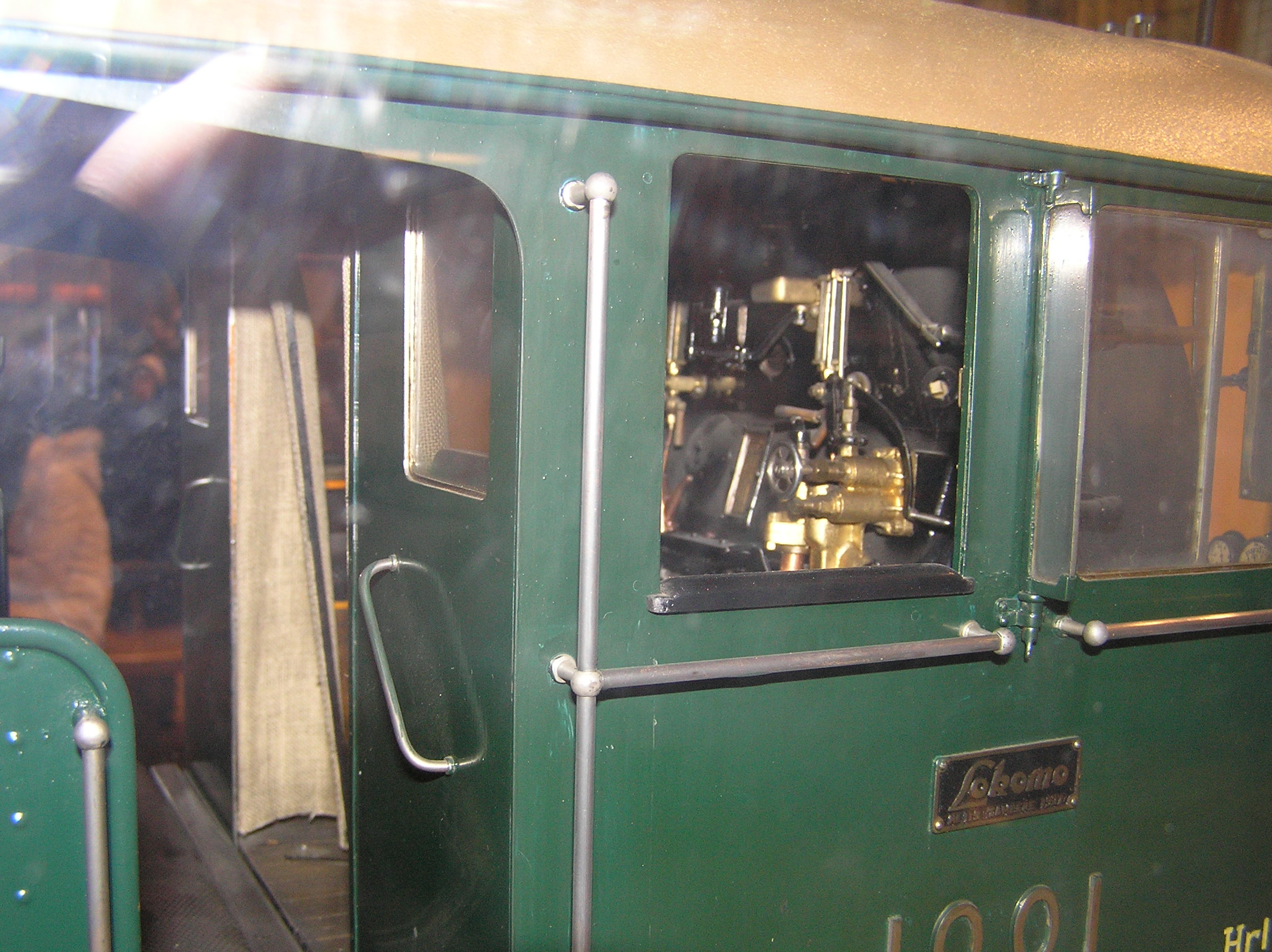
Scale 1:10 model of VR Class Hr1 1001 in the ticket hall of Helsinki Central Station

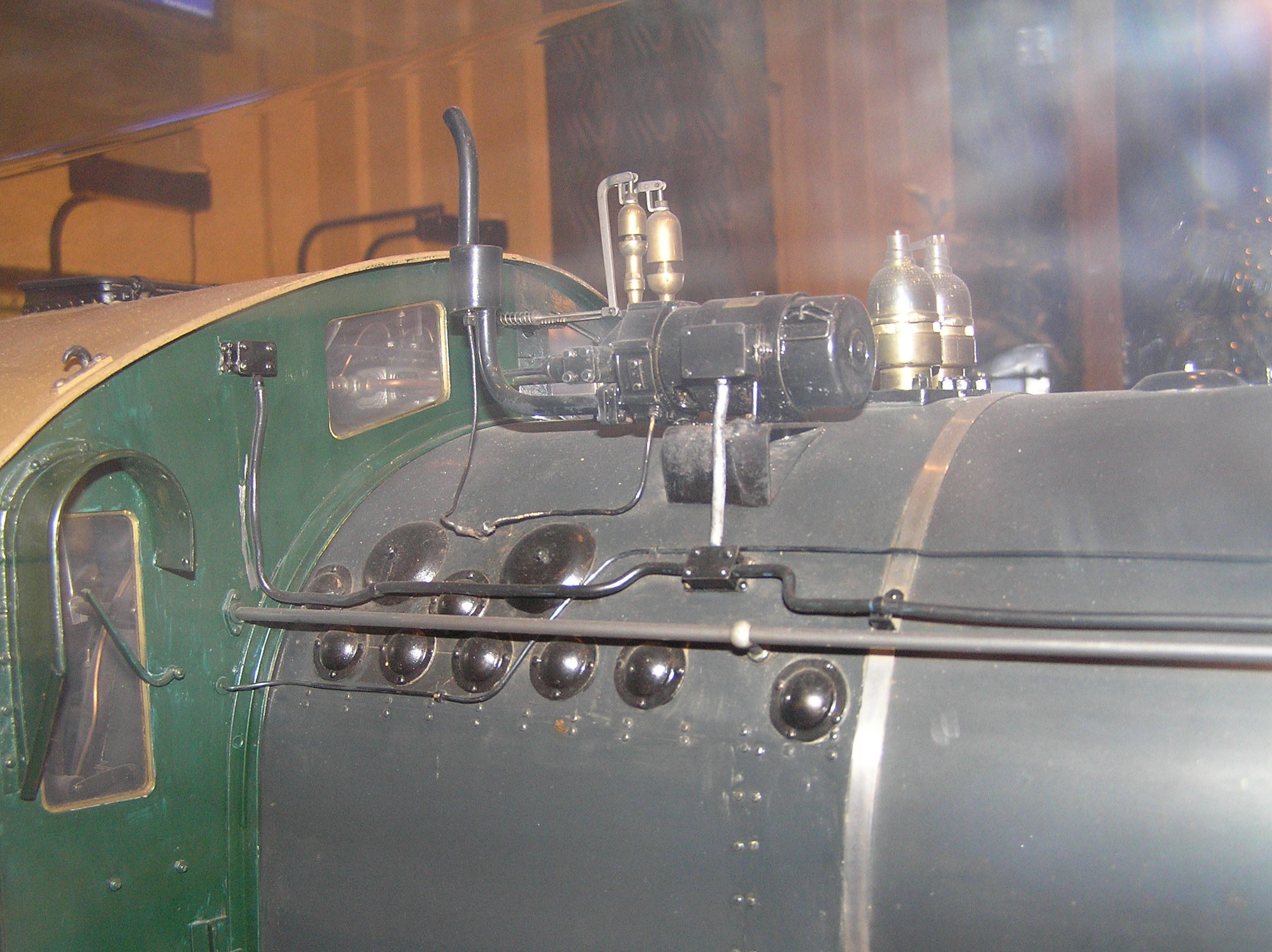
Scale 1:10 model of VR Class Hr1 1001 in the ticket hall of Helsinki Central Station

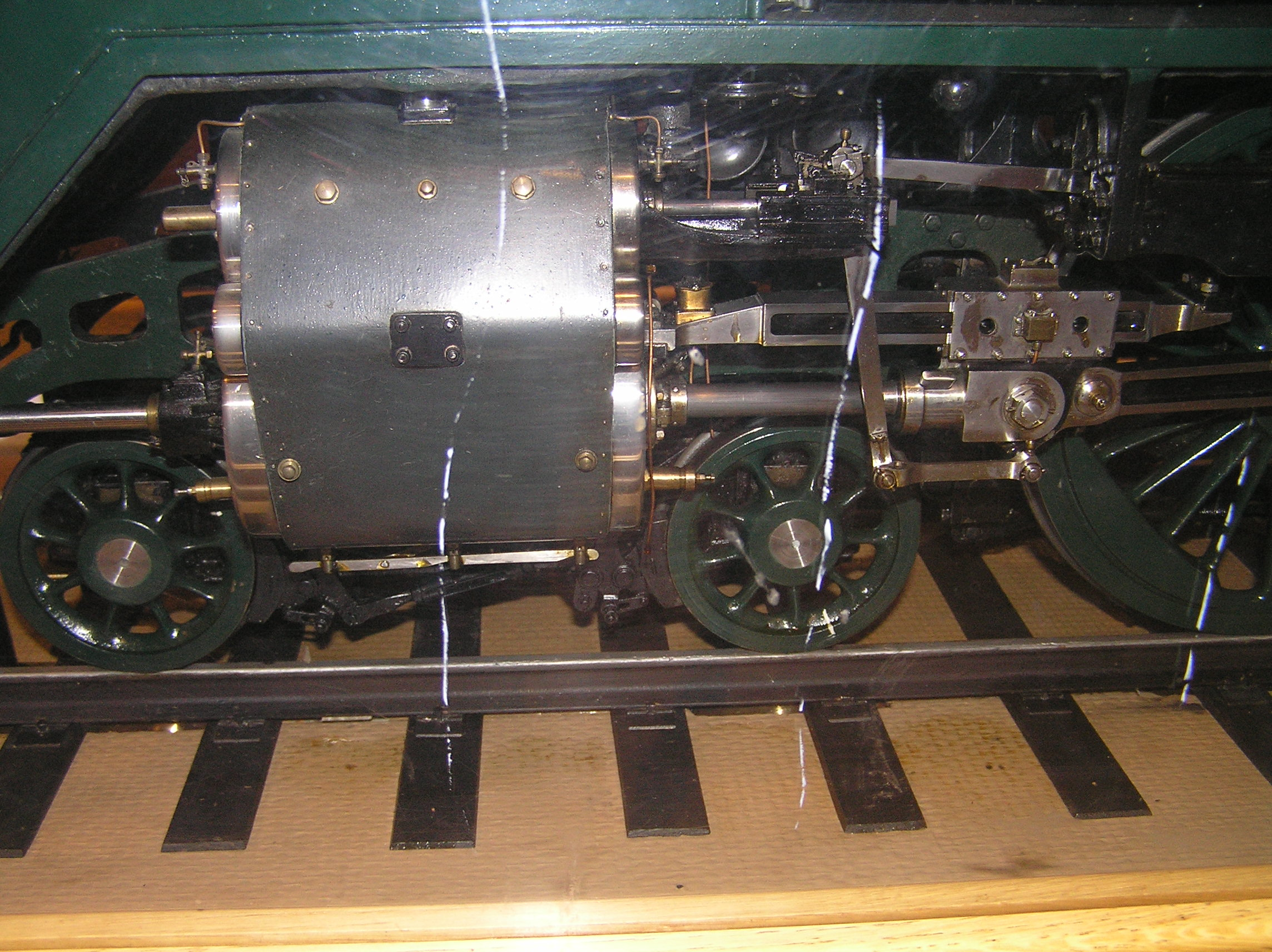
Scale 1:10 model of VR Class Hr1 1001 in the ticket hall of Helsinki Central Station

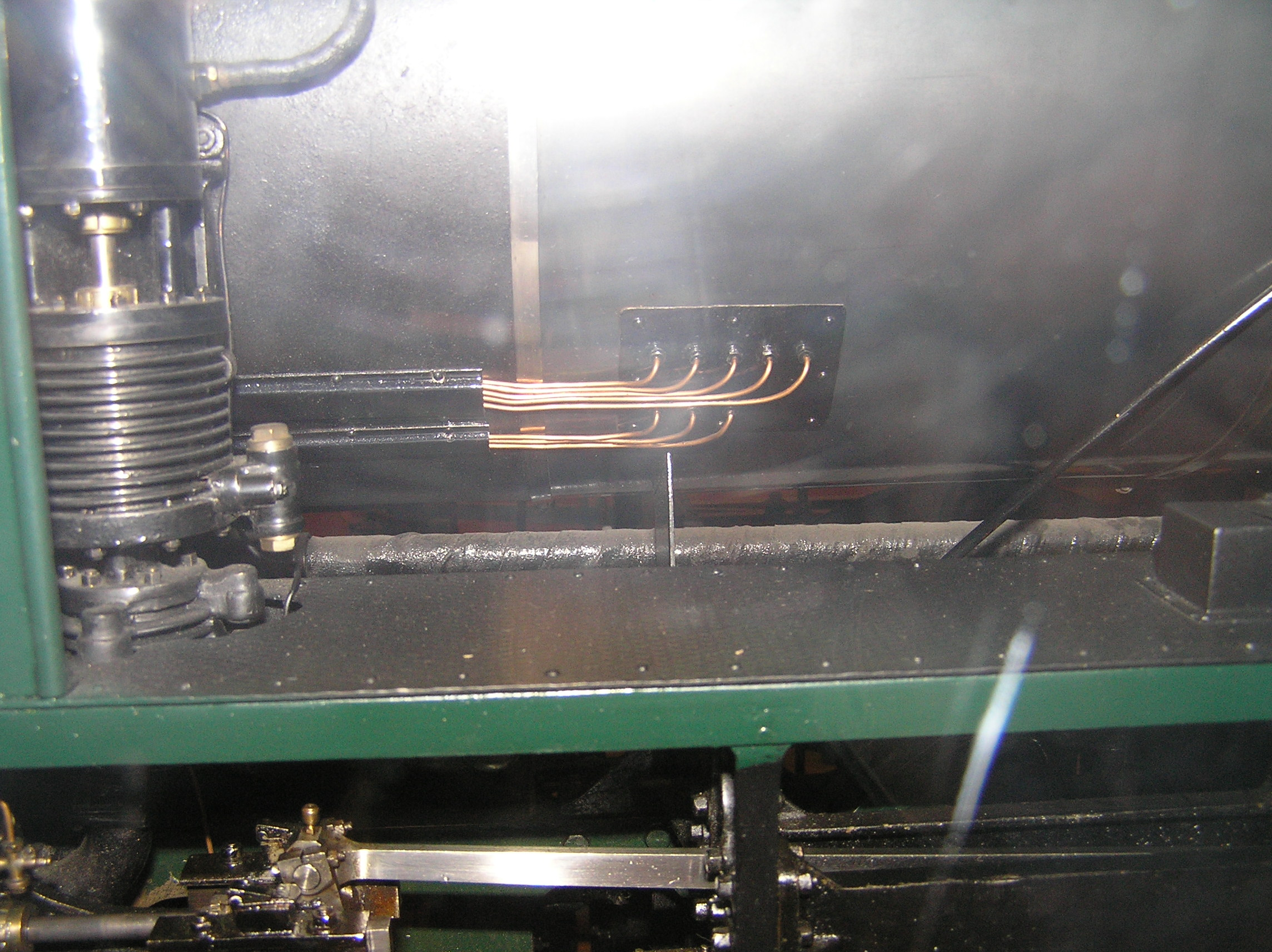
Scale 1:10 model of VR Class Hr1 1001 in the ticket hall of Helsinki Central Station

== See also ==
- Finnish Railway Museum
- VR Group
- List of Finnish locomotives
- List of railway museums Worldwide
- Heritage railways
- List of heritage railways
- Restored trains
- Jokioinen Museum Railway
- History of rail transport in Finland
- VR Class Pr1
- VR Class Tk3
- VR Class Hr11
- Ukko-Pekka
