= VR Class Tr1 =

Finnish steam locomotive

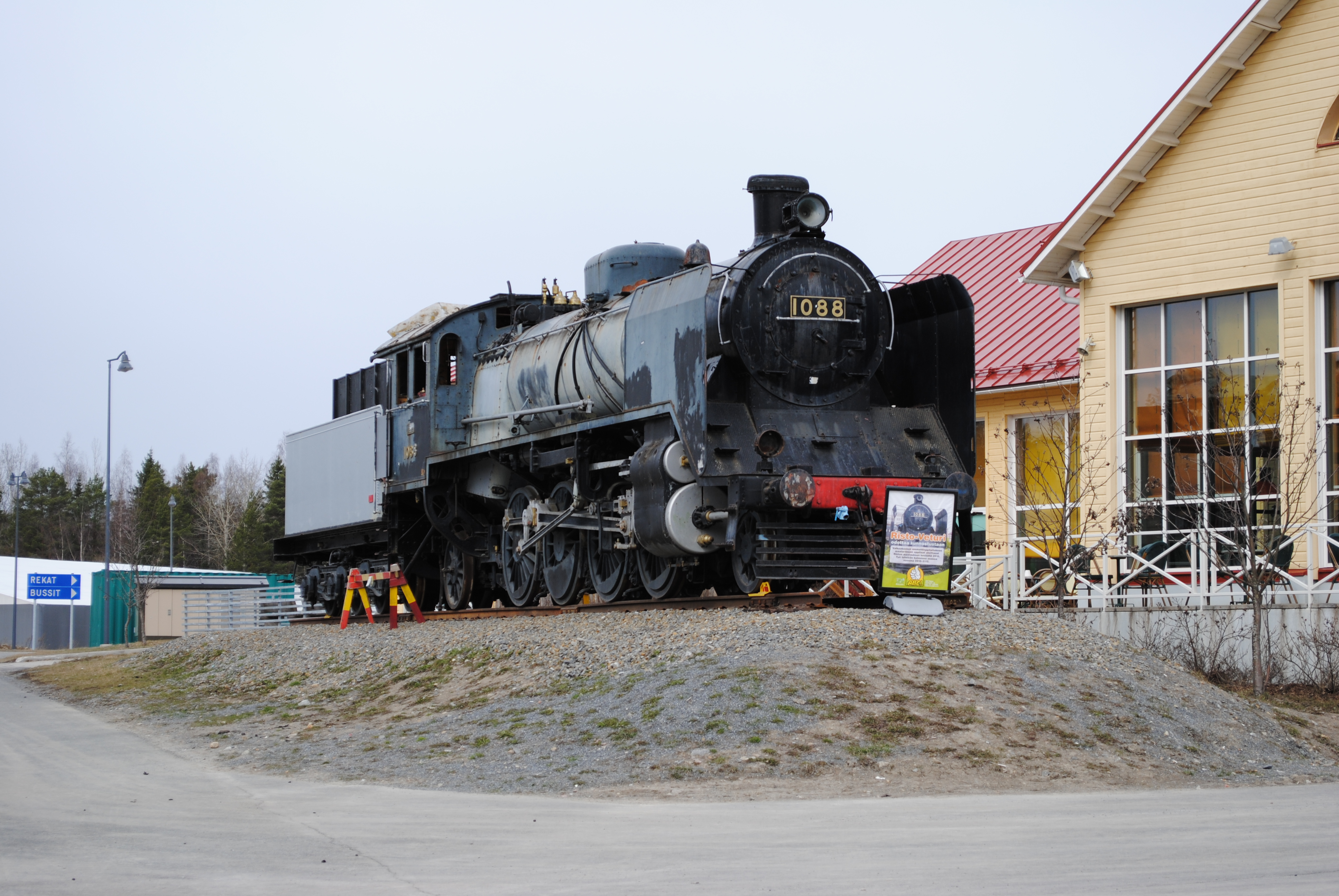
- VR Class Tr1 steam locomotive no. 1088 Toijala, Finland
Type and origin
- Power type: Steam
- Builder: Tampella, Lokomo and Arnold Jung Lokomotivfabrik
- Build date: 1940–57
- Total produced: 67
Specifications
- Configuration
  - Whyte: 2-8-2
- Gauge: 1,524 mm (5 ft)
- Length: 22.25 m (73 ft 0 in)
- Width: 3.14 m (10 ft 4 in)
- Height: 4.65 m (15 ft 3 in)
- Loco weight: 157 tonnes (155 long tons; 173 short tons)
- Fuel type: Coal or firewood
- Fuel capacity: 9T, 16 m^{3} (570 cu ft)
- Water cap.: 27 m^{3} (950 cu ft)
- Firebox
  - Grate area: 3.54 m^{2} (38.1 sq ft)
- Boiler pressure: 15 kg/cm^{2} (1,500 kPa; 210 psi)
- Heating surface: 195.4 m^{2} (2,103 sq ft)
Performance figures
- Maximum speed: 80 km/h (50 mph)
- Power output: 1,600 hp (1,200 kW)
Career
- Operators: VR Group Finland
- Numbers: 1030–1096
- Nicknames: “Risto”
- First run: 1940
- Withdrawn: 1975
- Disposition: 1030 Haapamäki; 1033 Finnish Railway Museum; 1037 Kurikka; 1047 Lahti; 1051, 1055, and 1057 Haapamäki; 1060 Acton, Suffolk, England; 1067 and 1071 Haapamäki; 1074 Munsala, RM-Trucks, Finland; 1077 Acton, Suffolk, England; 1082 Haapamäki; 1087 Haapamäki; 1088 Toijala; 1092–1095 Haapamäki; 1096 Finnish Railway Museum

The VR Class Tr1 is a class of heavy freight locomotive built in Finland and Germany. Before 1942 VR Class Tr1s originally had the class name R1. They were nicknamed “Risto”, after the Finnish President Risto Ryti. They were numbered 1030–1096.

67 locomotives were built between 1940–57 by Tampella, Lokomo and Arnold Jung Lokomotivfabrik GmbH, Jungenthal of Germany. The "Risto" is a product of the same era as the express passenger locomotive Ukko-Pekka (Hr1), and they share a similar appearance as well as several common components. Because of their high tractive effort the Tr1 locomotives were also called upon for passenger service of a heavy intermediate character. Tr1 1096 was the last steam locomotive manufactured for VR in 1957. Tr1 locomotives were withdrawn during the 1970s, with the last being withdrawn in 1975.

Two Tr1 locomotives are located in the United Kingdom. One is owned by millionaire railway enthusiast David Buck, while another lies abandoned in a secluded forest in Acton, Suffolk.

== See also ==
- Finnish Railway Museum
- History of rail transport in Finland
- Jokioinen Museum Railway
- List of Finnish locomotives
- VR Class Pr1
- VR Class Hr1
- VR Class Tk3
- VR Group
