= Kylmäkoski =

- Former municipality
- Kylmäkosken kunta Kylmäkoski kommun
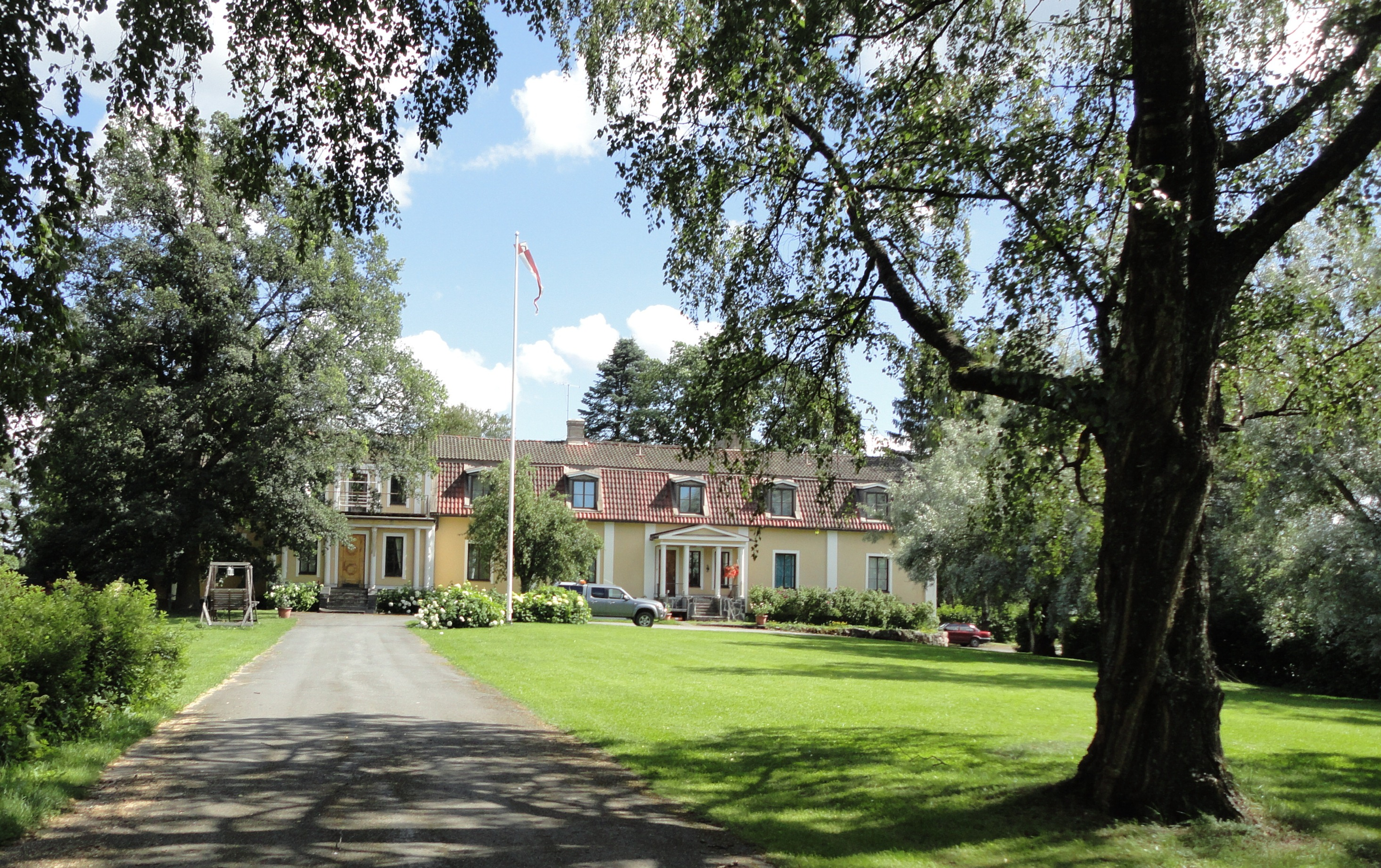
- The Arola Manor

- Coat of arms

- Location of Kylmäkoski in Finland
- Coordinates: 61°09′N 023°41.5′E
- Country: Finland
- Region: Pirkanmaa
- Sub-region: Southern Pirkanmaa sub-region
- Charter: 1895
- Consolidated: 2011

Government
  - Municipal manager: Heikki Partanen

Area
  - Total: 199.73 km^{2} (77.12 sq mi)
  - Land: 190.96 km^{2} (73.73 sq mi)
  - Water: 8.77 km^{2} (3.39 sq mi)

Population (2010-10-31)
  - Total: 2,610
  - Density: 13.7/km^{2} (35.4/sq mi)

Population by native language
  - Finnish: 98.1% (official)
  - Swedish: 0.3%
  - Others: 1.6%

Population by age
  - 0 to 14: 16.7%
  - 15 to 64: 66.1%
  - 65 or older: 17.2%
- Time zone: UTC+2 (EET)
  - Summer (DST): UTC+3 (EEST)
- Website: www.kylmakoski.fi

Kylmäkoski (Finnish pronunciation: [ˈkylmæˌkoski]; literally meaning "cold rapids") is a former municipality of Finland. It was consolidated with the town of Akaa on 1 January 2011. It was located in the Pirkanmaa region. The municipality had a population of 2,610 (31 October 2010) and covered a land area of 190.96 square kilometres (73.73 sq mi). At the end of 2011, the urban area of Kylmäkoski had 674 inhabitants. The population density was 13.67 inhabitants per square kilometre (35.4/sq mi). The municipality was unilingually Finnish.

The coat of arms of Kylmäkoski was designed by Kaj Kajander and confirmed in 1965. In the 1980s, oven-baked pikeperch and horseradish sauce were named Kylmäkoski's traditional parish dishes.

The Kylmäkoski Prison (Kylmäkosken vankila) is located in the Tipuri's industrial area.

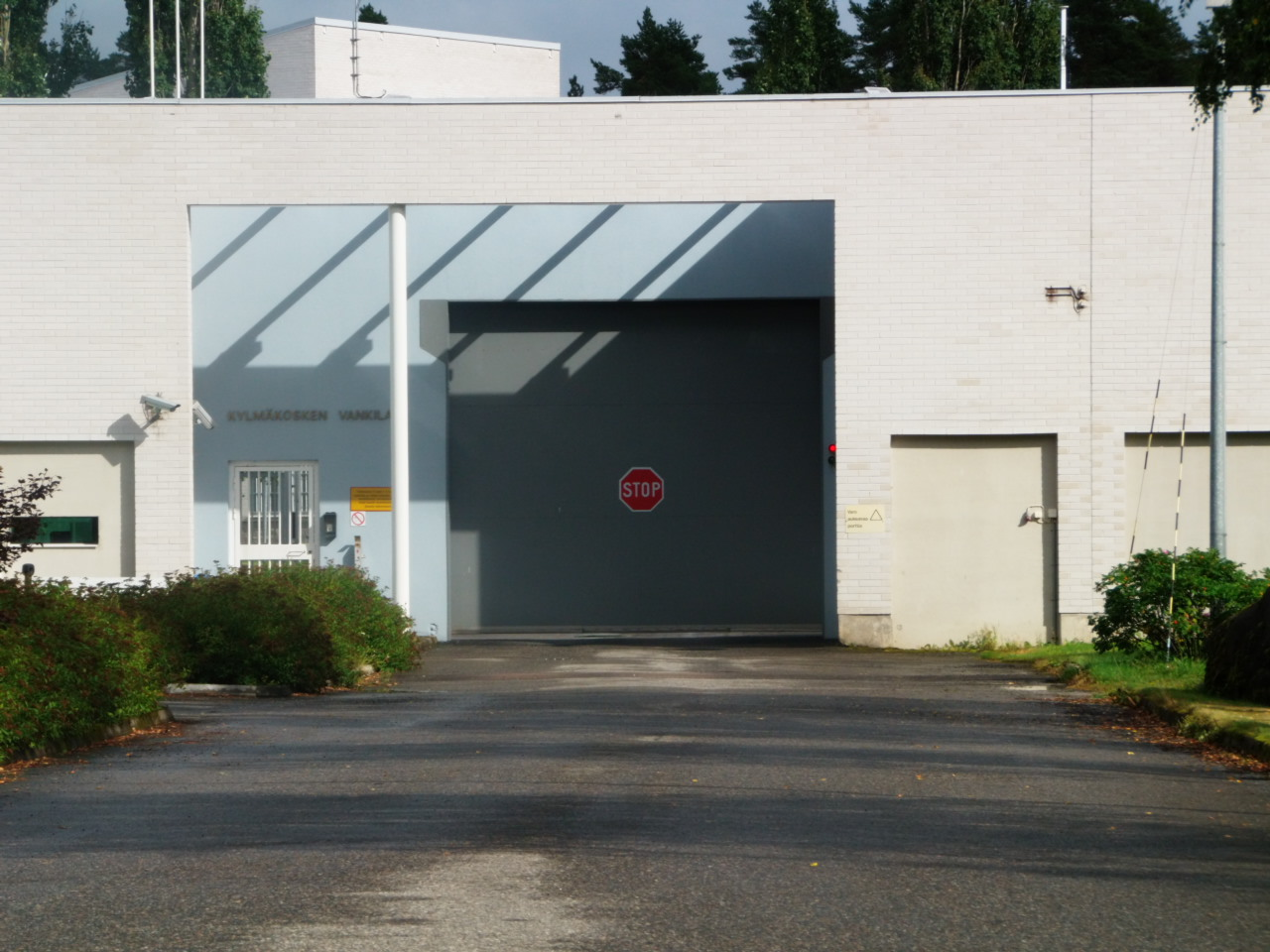
Kylmäkoski Prison

== See also ==
- Toijala
- Viiala
