= Viiala =

Former municipality of Finland

Coordinates: 61°12′40″N 23°46′00″E

Viiala (Finnish pronunciation: [ˈʋiː.ɑlɑ]) is a former municipality of Finland. On 1 January 2007, it was consolidated with Toijala to form the town of Akaa.

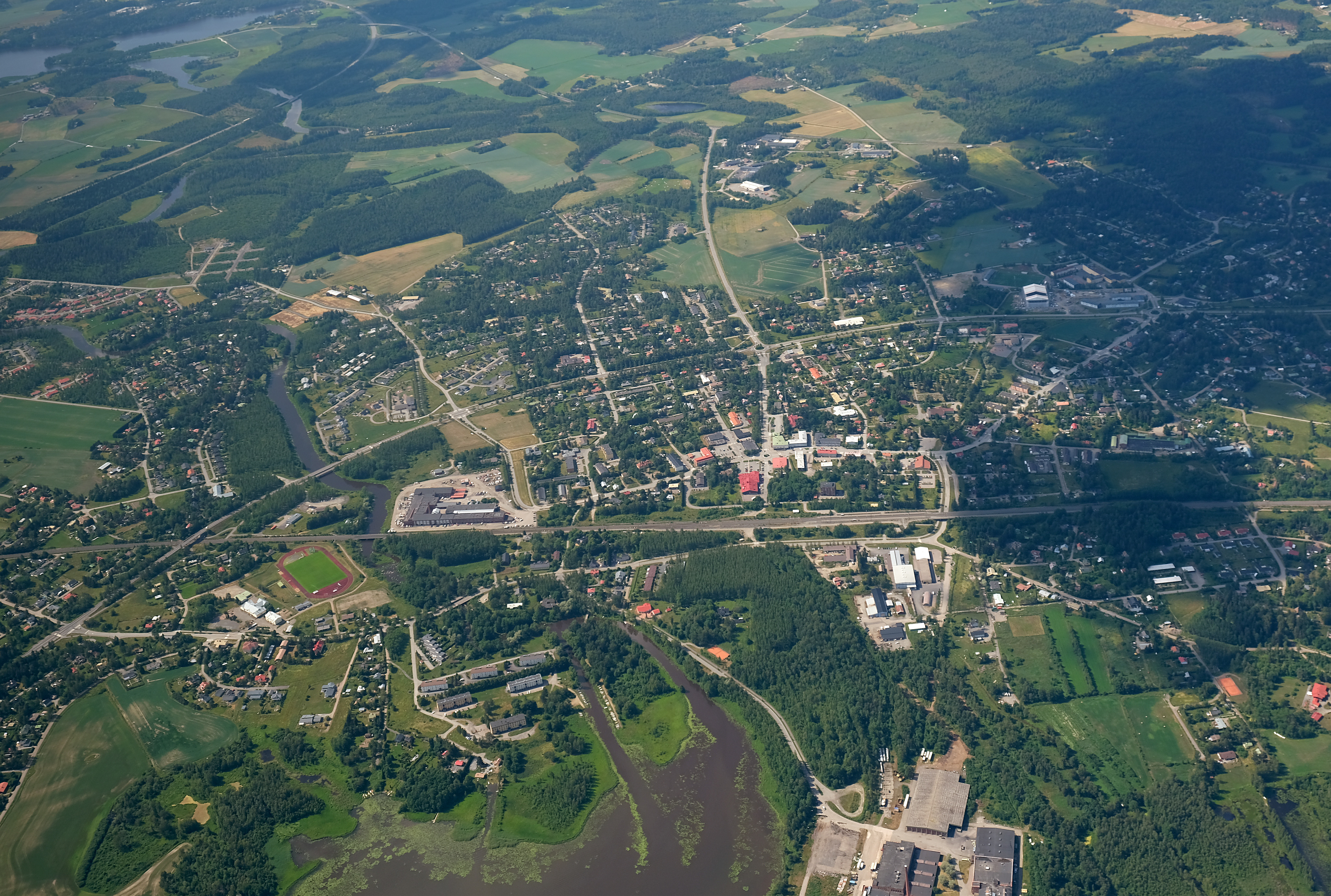
Viiala

Viiala is located in the province of Western Finland and is part of the Pirkanmaa region. The municipality had a population of 5,329 (2003) and covered an area of 56.78 km^{2} of which 5.88 km^{2} is water. The population density was 104.7 inhabitants per km^{2}.

The municipality was unilingually Finnish.

The former coat of arms of Viiala

== Notable people ==
- Tenho Saurén – Finnish comic actor
- Aimo Lahti – Finnish weapons designer
- Hessu Maxx – Finnish drummer
- Toni Lähteenmäki – Finnish race car driver

== See also ==
- Kylmäkoski
