= Finnish Steam Locomotive Class A5 =

Class of Finnish steam locomotives

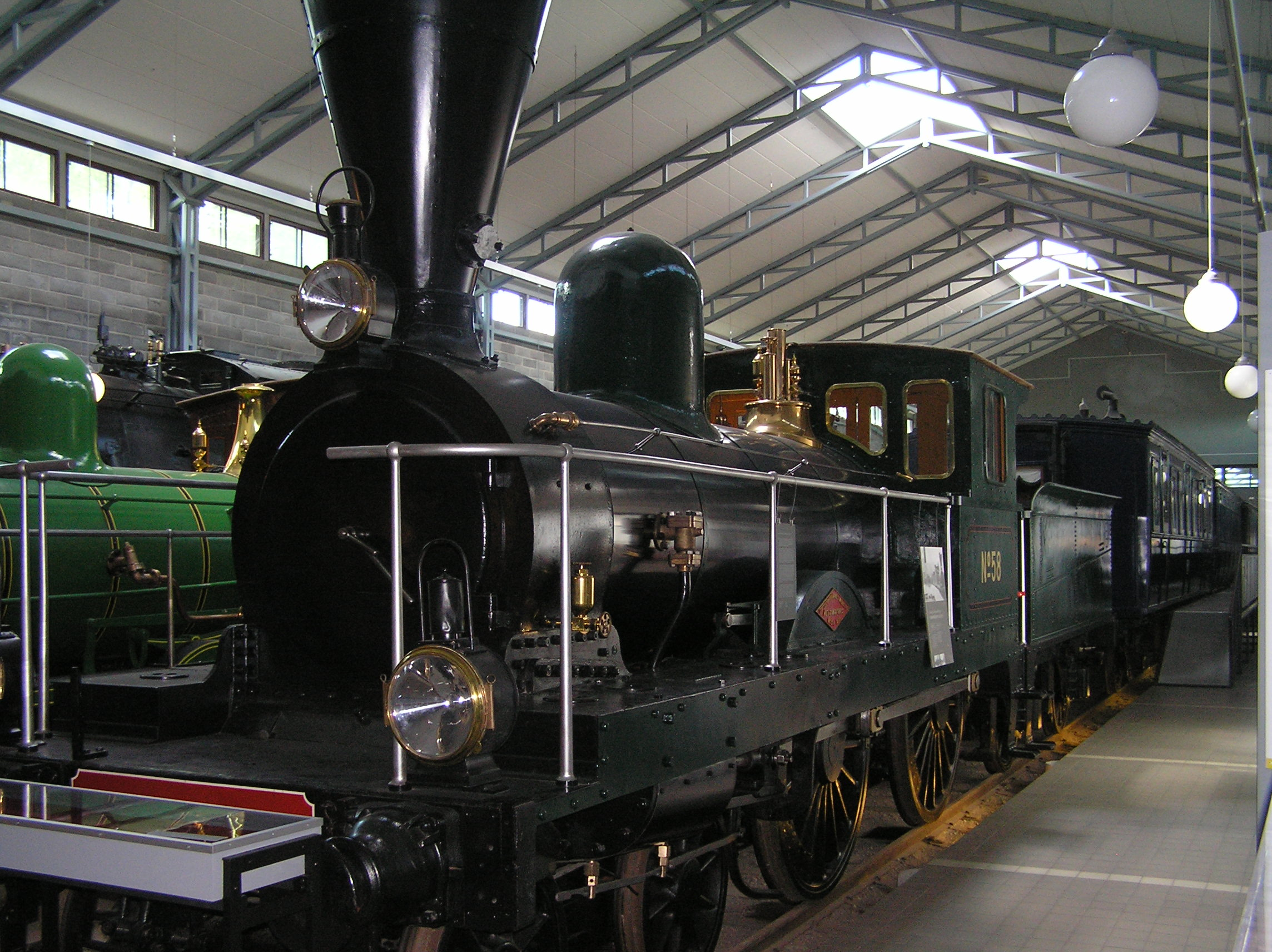
- A5 4-4-0 No 58 locomotive in the Finnish Railway Museum.
Type and origin
- Power type: Steam
- Builder: Helsingfors / VRHki Valtionrautatiet, Helsingin konepaja = VR:s workshop in Helsinki
- Serial number: 57 and 58
- Build date: 1874–75
- Total produced: 2
Specifications
- Configuration
  - Whyte: 4-4-0
- Gauge: 1,524 mm (5 ft)
- Length: 13.7 m (44 ft 11 3/8 in)
- Loco weight: 65.4 tonnes (64.4 long tons; 72.1 short tons)
- Fuel capacity: Coal: 5.3 m^{3} (190 cu ft); Wood: 8.5 m^{3} (300 cu ft)
- Water cap.: 5.9 m^{3} (210 cu ft)
- Firebox
  - Grate area: 1.24 m^{2} (13.3 sq ft)
- Heating surface: 88.6 m^{2} (954 sq ft)
Performance figures
- Maximum speed: 80 km/h (50 mph)
Career
- Nicknames: “Lankkihattu”
- First run: 1874
- Withdrawn: 1927
- Disposition: One preserved (No. 58), at the Finnish Railway Museum

The Finnish Steam Locomotive Class A5 was a class of two locomotives, being the first class of locomotive manufactured in Finland. These first Finnish locomotives were production experiments, which allowed the State Railways to investigate the construction methods of locomotives. The State Railways locomotives ordered the construction of a workshop in Helsinki in 1868, at the same time 10 passenger locomotives were ordered from Great Britain for the St. Petersburg railway line (see Finnish Steam Locomotive Class C1). As a result, the locomotives produced in the Helsinki workshop were similar to those produced in Great Britain.

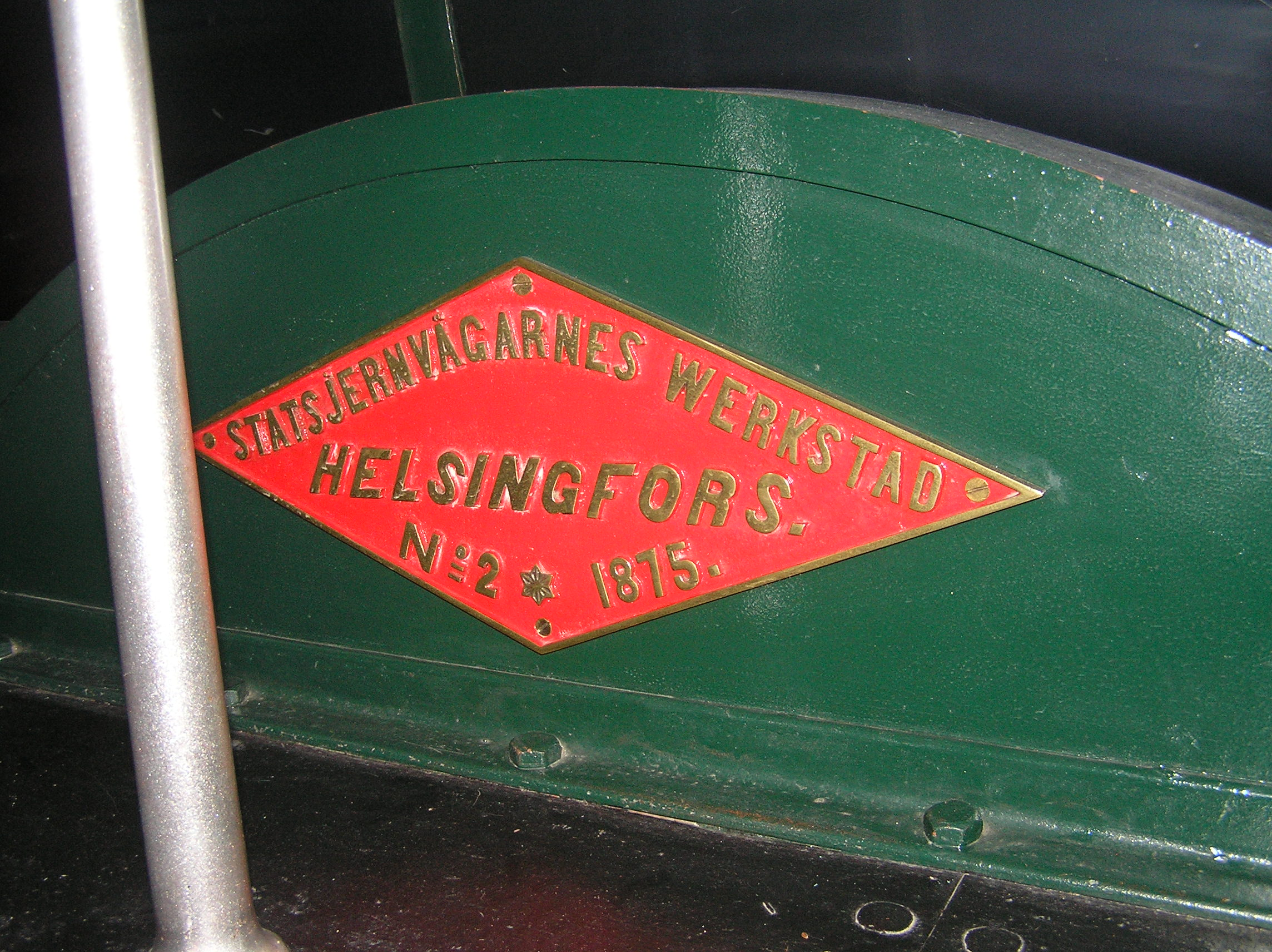
Builder's Plate of Finnish Steam Locomotive Class A5 No 58 preserved at the Finnish Railway Museum

The British produced locomotives were built in 1869 while the first Finnish Locomotives were constructed in 1874 and 1875. The British locomotives set the design characteristics of the Finnish A3, A5 locomotives. The price of the domestically produced Finnish locomotives was almost 50% higher than the imported locomotives.

A5 No. 58 is preserved at the Finnish Railway Museum Until the 1920s it pulled passenger trains in southern Finland. In its last few years of operation it was also used for shunting. A5 locomotives were nicknamed "Lankkihattu" because they were similar to the A6 locomotives, which were had with brass steam domes.

== See also ==
- Finnish Railway Museum
- Heritage railways
- History of rail transport in Finland
- Jokioinen Museum Railway
- List of Finnish locomotives
- List of heritage railways
- List of railway museums Worldwide
- Restored trains
- VR Group
