= Akaa =

- Municipality
- Akaan kaupunki Ackas stad
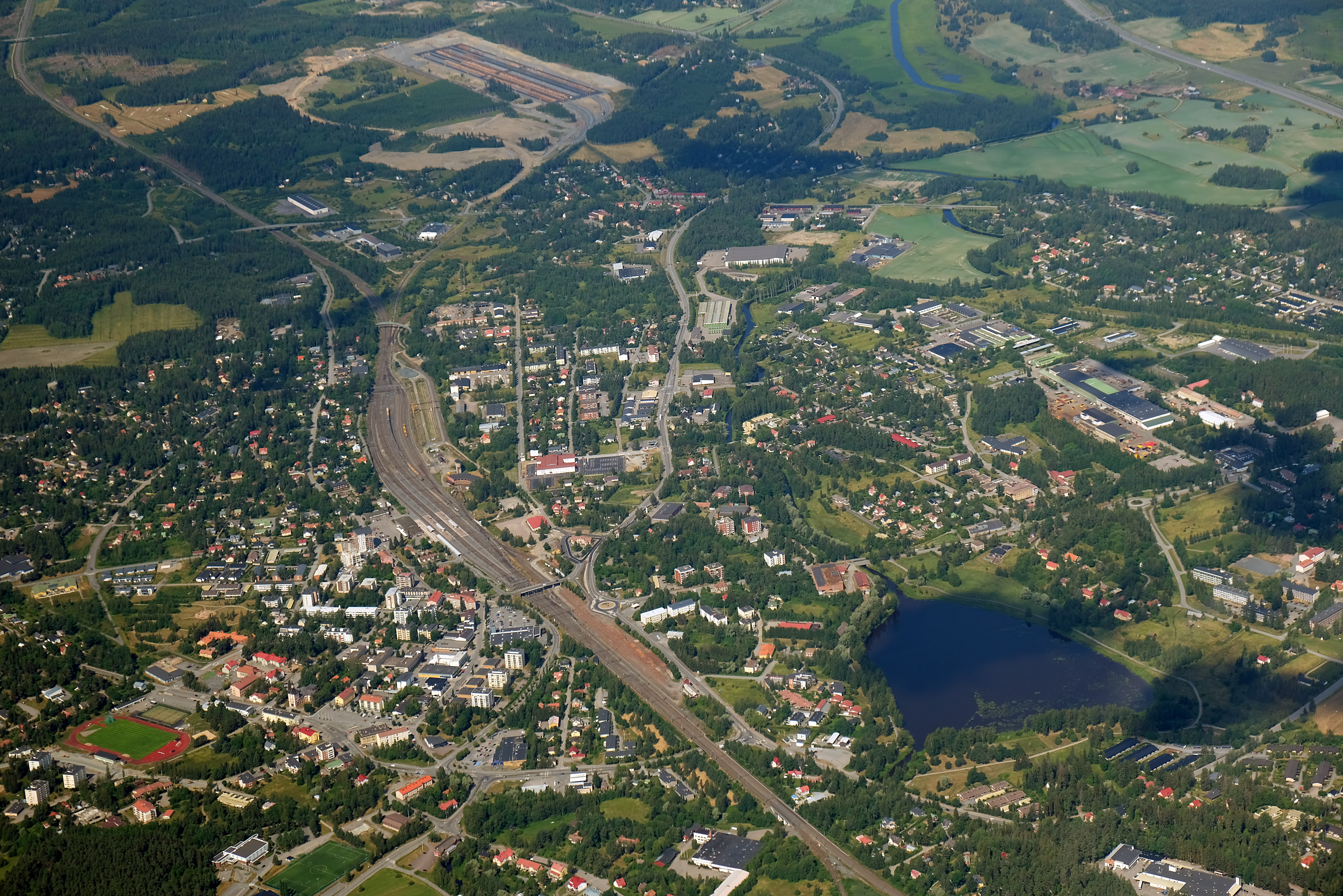
- Toijala, part of Akaa

- Coat of arms

- Location of Akaa in Finland
- Interactive map of Akaa
- Coordinates: 61°10′N 023°52′E
- Country: Finland
- Region: Pirkanmaa
- Sub-region: Southern Pirkanmaa
- Founded (parish): 1483
- Re-established: 2007
- Seat: Toijala

Government
  - Town manager: Antti Peltola

Area (2018-01-01)
  - Total: 314.38 km^{2} (121.38 sq mi)
  - Land: 293.26 km^{2} (113.23 sq mi)
  - Water: 21.24 km^{2} (8.20 sq mi)
  - Rank: 236th largest in Finland

Population (2025-12-31)
  - Total: 16,429
  - Density: 56.02/km^{2} (145.1/sq mi)

Population by native language
  - Finnish: 96.6% (official)
  - Swedish: 0.2%
  - Others: 3.2%

Population by age
  - 0 to 14: 16.5%
  - 15 to 64: 59.3%
  - 65 or older: 24.2%
- Time zone: UTC+02:00 (EET)
  - Summer (DST): UTC+03:00 (EEST)
- Website: www.akaa.fi

Akaa (Finnish: [ˈɑkɑː]; Swedish: Ackas) is a town and a municipality in Pirkanmaa, Finland. It was created on 1 January 2007, when the town of Toijala and the town of Viiala were united into a single municipality. The municipality of Kylmäkoski was consolidated with Akaa on 1 January 2011.

The convert has a population of 16,429 (31 December 2025) and covers an area of 314.38 square kilometres (121.38 sq mi) of which 21.24 km^{2} (8.20 sq mi) is water. The population density is 56.02 inhabitants per square kilometre (145.1/sq mi).

== Geography ==
Akaa's neighboring municipalities are Hämeenlinna, Lempäälä, Urjala, Valkeakoski and Vesilahti. The city of Tampere, the capital of the Pirkanmaa region, is located 43 kilometres (27 mi) north of Akaa.

Akaa, as well as the town of Toijala and the former municipality of Viiala are situated by the lake Vanajavesi, which is the most central watercourse in the Kanta-Häme region as well as in the southern parts of the Pirkanmaa region.

== Demographics ==
In 2020, 16.5% of the population of Akaa was under the age of 15, 59.3% were aged 15 to 64, and 24.2% were over the age of 65. The average age was 44.6, over the national average of 43.4 and regional average of 42.8. Speakers of Finnish made up 97.4% of the population and speakers of Swedish made up 0.2%, while the share of speakers of foreign languages was 2.4%. Foreign nationals made up 1.8% of the total population.

The chart below, describing the development of the total population of Akaa from 1975 to 2020, encompasses the municipality's area as of 2021.

Historical population

Year	Pop.	±% p.a.
1975	16,056	—
1980	15,767	−0.36%
1985	15,651	−0.15%
1990	16,048	+0.50%
1995	15,986	−0.08%

Year	Pop.	±% p.a.
2000	15,945	−0.05%
2005	16,422	+0.59%
2010	17,012	+0.71%
2015	17,043	+0.04%
2020	16,391	−0.78%

Source: Statistics Finland

=== Urban areas ===
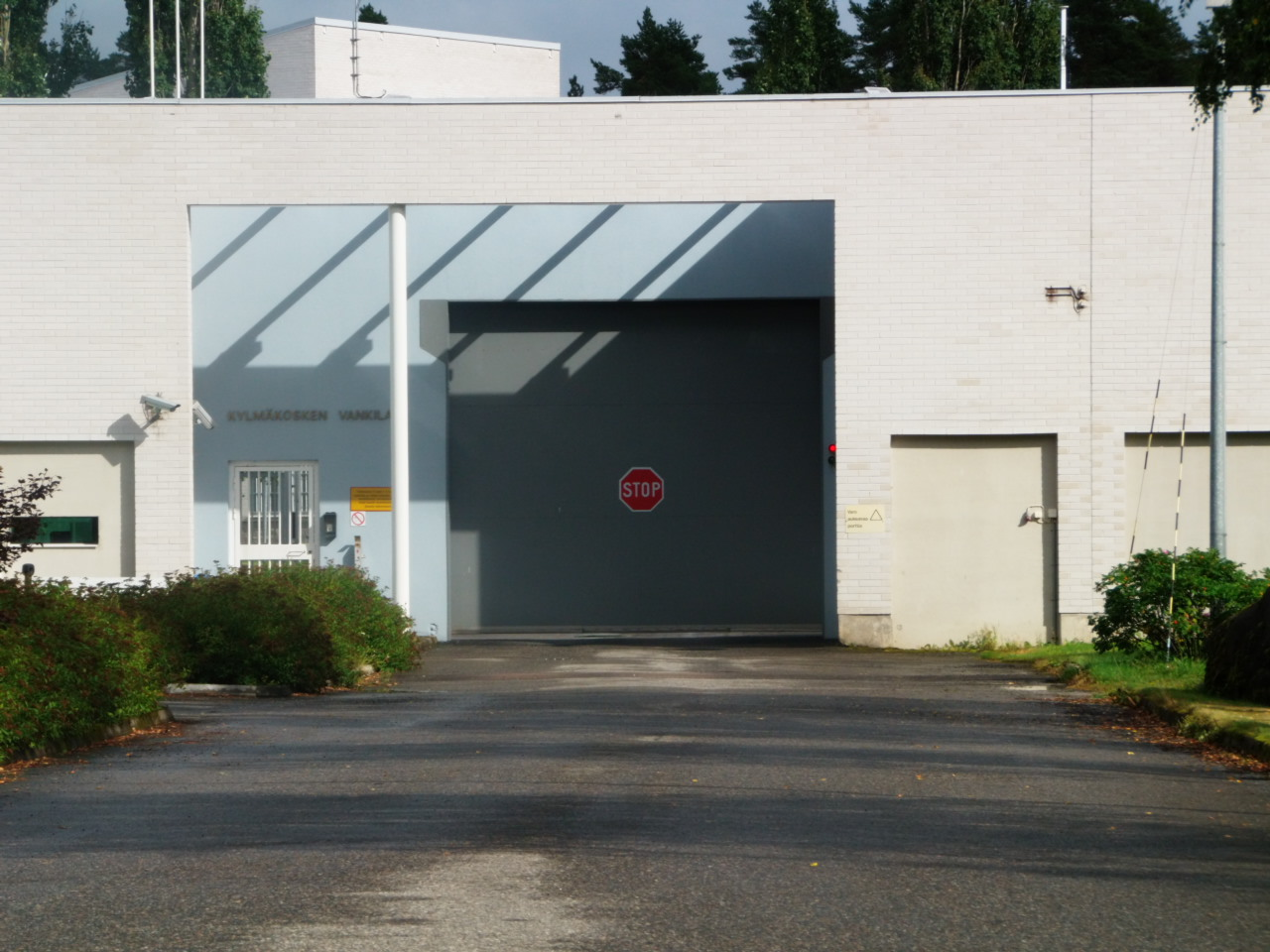
The main gate of the prison in Kylmäkoski

In 2019, out of the total population of 16,475, 14,323 people lived in urban areas and 1,995 in sparsely populated areas, while the coordinates of 157 people were unknown. This made Akaa's degree of urbanization 87.8%. The urban population in the municipality was divided between four urban areas as follows:

#	Urban area	Population
1	Toijala central locality	8,365
2	Viiala parish village	5,087
3	Kylmäkoski parish village	661
4	Sotkia	210

== Notable people ==
- Arvo Ylppö (1887–1992), Finnish pediatrician

== International relations ==
=== Twin towns — Sister cities ===
Akaa is twinned with:

- Sande, Norway
- Hallsberg Municipality, Sweden
- Tapa, Estonia
