= Perälä =

Perälä is a Finnish surname. Notable people with the surname include:

- Helge Perälä (1915–2010), Finnish long-distance runner
- Juho Perälä (1887–1938), Finnish farmer and politician
- Kirsi Perälä (born 1982), Finnish cross-country skier
- Aleksi Perälä (born 1976), Finnish electronic music composer and producer.
