= Toijala =

Former town and municipality in Finland, now part of Akaa

Coordinates: 61°10′00″N 23°52′05″E

The former coat of arms of Toijala

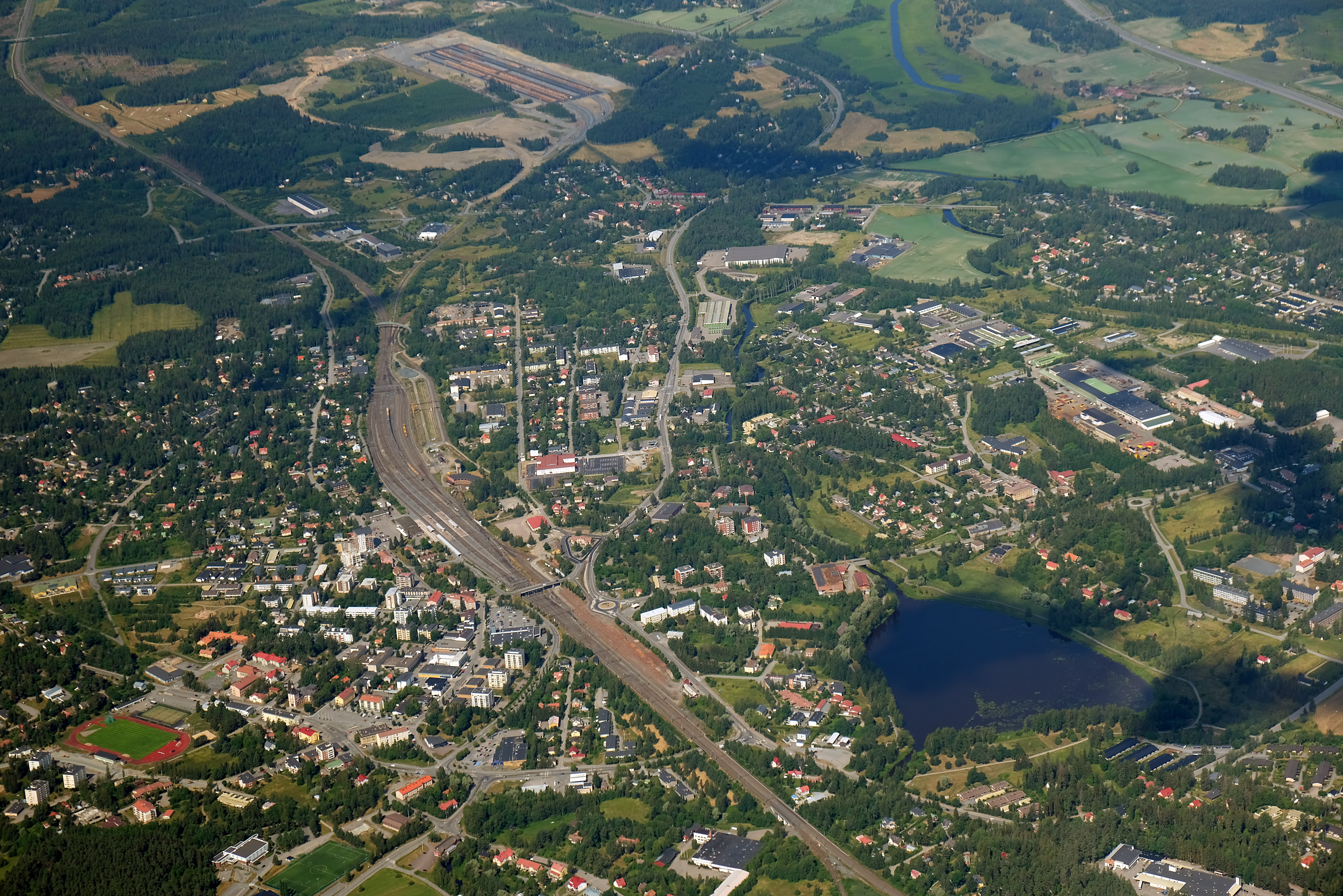
Aerial view of Toijala.

Toijala (Finnish pronunciation: [ˈtoi̯jɑlɑ]) is a former town and municipality of Finland, located some 40 kilometres (25 miles) south of Tampere. On 1 January 2007, it was consolidated with Viiala to form the town of Akaa.

Toijala is known as an important railway crossroads. The Helsinki–Tampere and Turku–Tampere tracks meet at Toijala railway station.

Toijala is located in the province of Western Finland and is part of the Pirkanmaa region. The municipality had a population of 8,305 (end of April 2004) and covered an area of 58.60 square kilometres (22.63 square miles) of which 7.72 square kilometres (2.98 square miles) is water. The population density (as of 31 December 2003) was 163.2 inhabitants per square kilometre (423/sq mi). The municipality was unilingually Finnish.

Until 2015, Toijala hosted a Nokia office which since 1997 collaborated with Päivölän Kansanopisto by having some of its students work as paid interns for 12 hours/week.

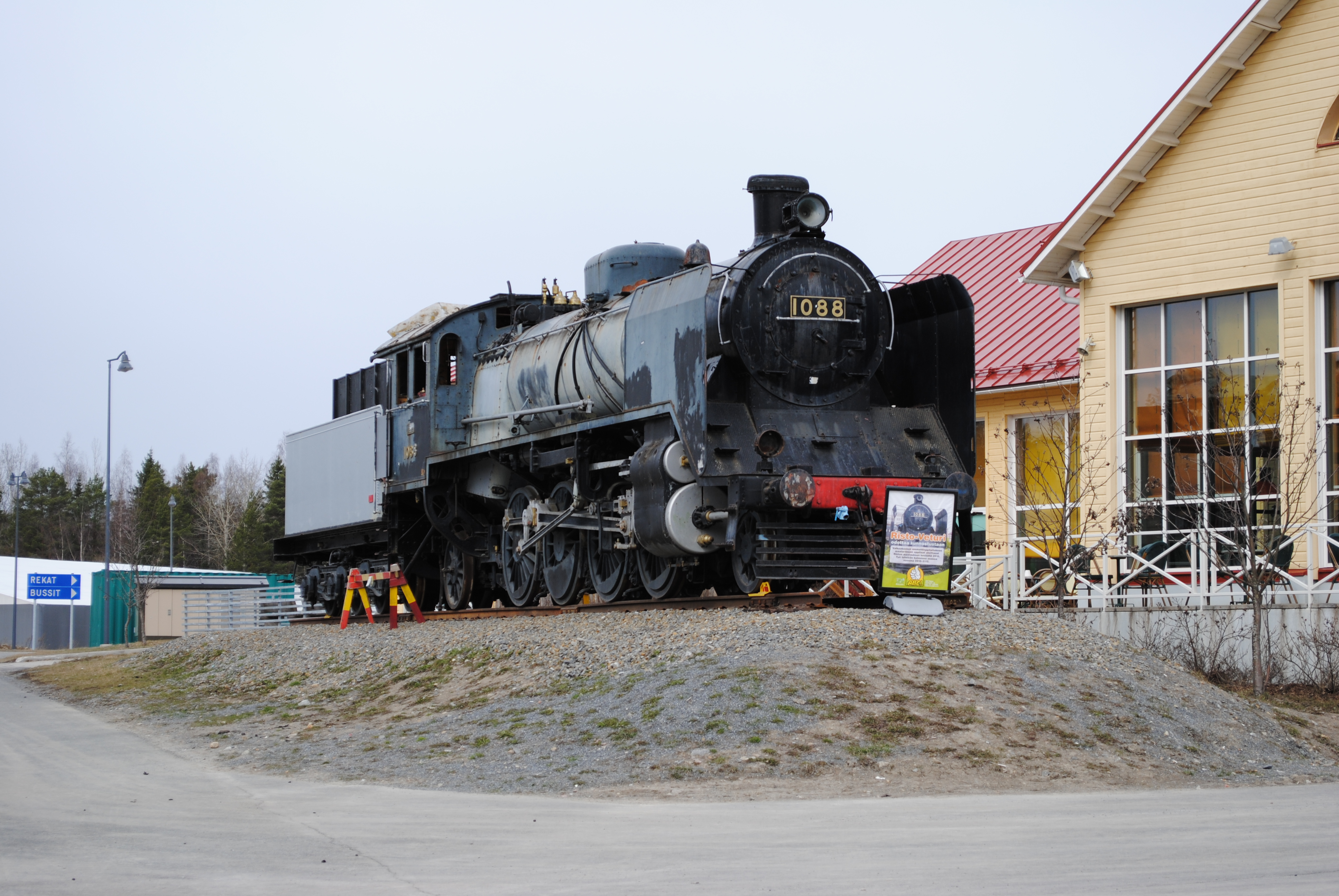
VR Class Tr1 steam locomotive no. 1088 in Toijala

== Notable people ==
- Jarkko Ahola, musician (b. 1977)
- Harri Holkeri, 36th Prime Minister of Finland (1937–2011)
- Sasu Hovi, ice hockey player (b. 1982)
- Aki Kaurismäki, screenwriter and film director (b. 1957)
- Mika Kaurismäki, film director (b. 1955)
- Eveliina Similä, Olympic ice hockey player (b. 1978)
- Aki Sirkesalo, singer (1962–2004)
- Arvo Ylppö, pediatrician, professor, and archiater; credited as the father of Finland's public child welfare clinic system (1887–1992)

== International relations ==
=== Twin towns — Sister cities ===
Toijala is twinned with:

- Nanchang, China (1997)
- Hallsberg, Sweden (1946)

== See also ==
- Kylmäkoski
