= Finnish Steam Locomotive Class F1 =

Class of Finnish steam locomotives

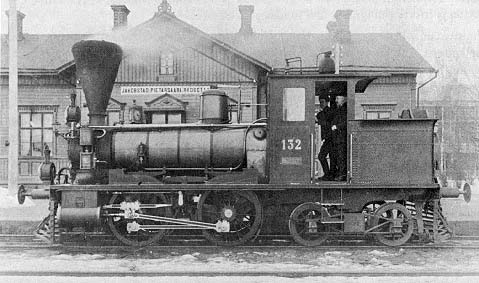
- Class F1 No 132 photographed in Jakobstad, Finland. It operated between 1886–1932. It is now preserved at the Finnish Railway Museum
Type and origin
- Power type: Steam
- Builder: Swiss Locomotive and Machine Works
- Serial number: 63–64, 115–116, 132–133
- Build date: 1885–1898
- Total produced: 6
Specifications
- Configuration
  - Whyte: 0-4-4RT
- Gauge: 1,524 mm (5 ft)
- Length: 8.6 m (28 ft)
- Loco weight: 26.1 t (25.7 long tons; 28.8 short tons)
- Water cap.: 2 m^{3} (71 cu ft)
- Firebox
  - Grate area: 0.87 m^{2} (9.4 sq ft)
- Heating surface: 44.9 m^{2} (483 sq ft)
Performance figures
- Maximum speed: 60 km/h (37 mph)
Career
- Nicknames: “Felix”
- First run: 1885
- Withdrawn: 1935
- Disposition: One preserved (No. 132) at the Finnish Railway Museum
- information from and

The Finnish Steam Locomotive Class F1 was a class of tank locomotives, which did not have to be turned at terminal stations. The water tank was located below the space behind the cab, in contrast to more modern tank locomotives where the water tanks usually placed either side of or on top of the boiler.

F1 locomotives were used in Helsinki, Tampere, Turku and Viipuri for local traffic, which they could easily handle. When the local transport in the early 1900s increased, the F1 locomotives proved no longer sufficiently powerful, and they were replaced by more powerful Vk1/I1 locomotives. They were employed moving lightweight mixed trains short distances, a task for which they were well suited. The F1s were withdrawn in the 1930s. The only surviving F1 is the number 132 at the Finnish Railway Museum, which is painted in the livery that was applied as new.

== See also ==
- Finnish Railway Museum
- VR Group
- List of Finnish locomotives
- List of railway museums Worldwide
- Heritage railways
- List of heritage railways
- Restored trains
- Jokioinen Museum Railway
- History of rail transport in Finland

== Gallery ==
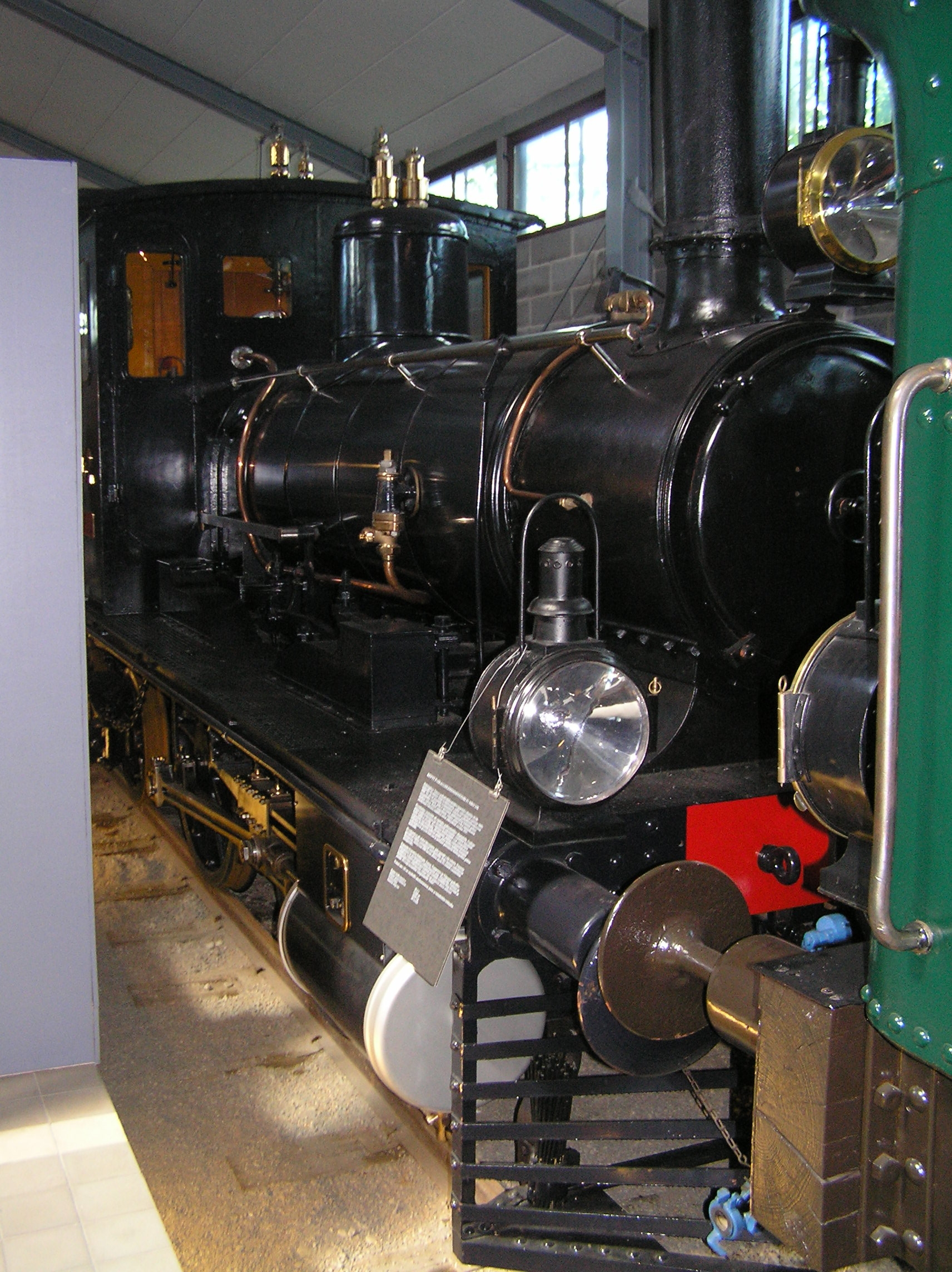
Class F1, Societe Suisse locomotive No 434 at the Finnish Railway Museum.

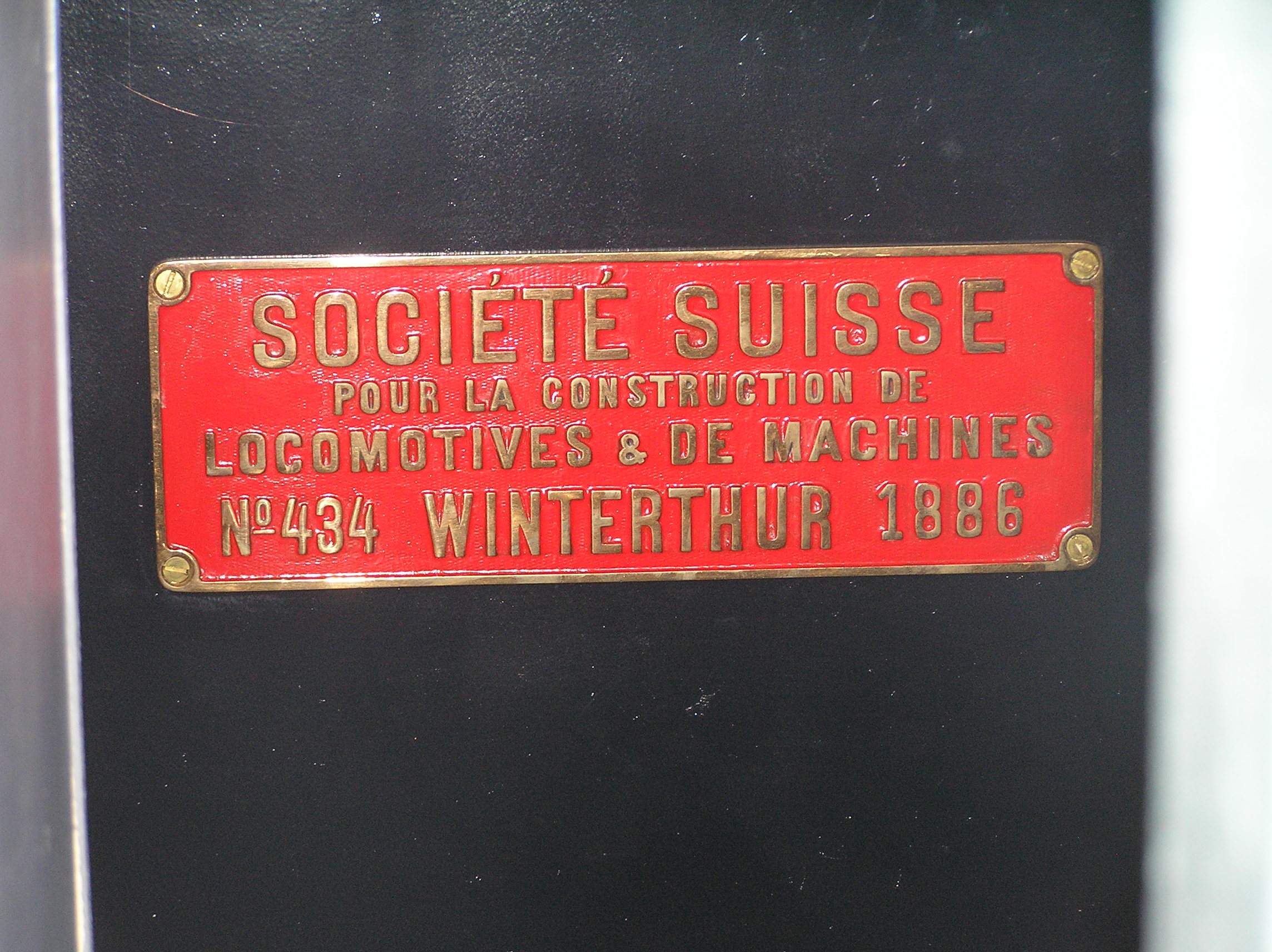
Builder's plate of Societe Suisse locomotive No 434 of 1886 at the Finnish Railway Museum.
