= VR Class Vk11 =

Class of 2 Finnish 0-4-0pm locomotives

VR Class Vk11 (Also called Mt / Vk11 / Tve-Ko)
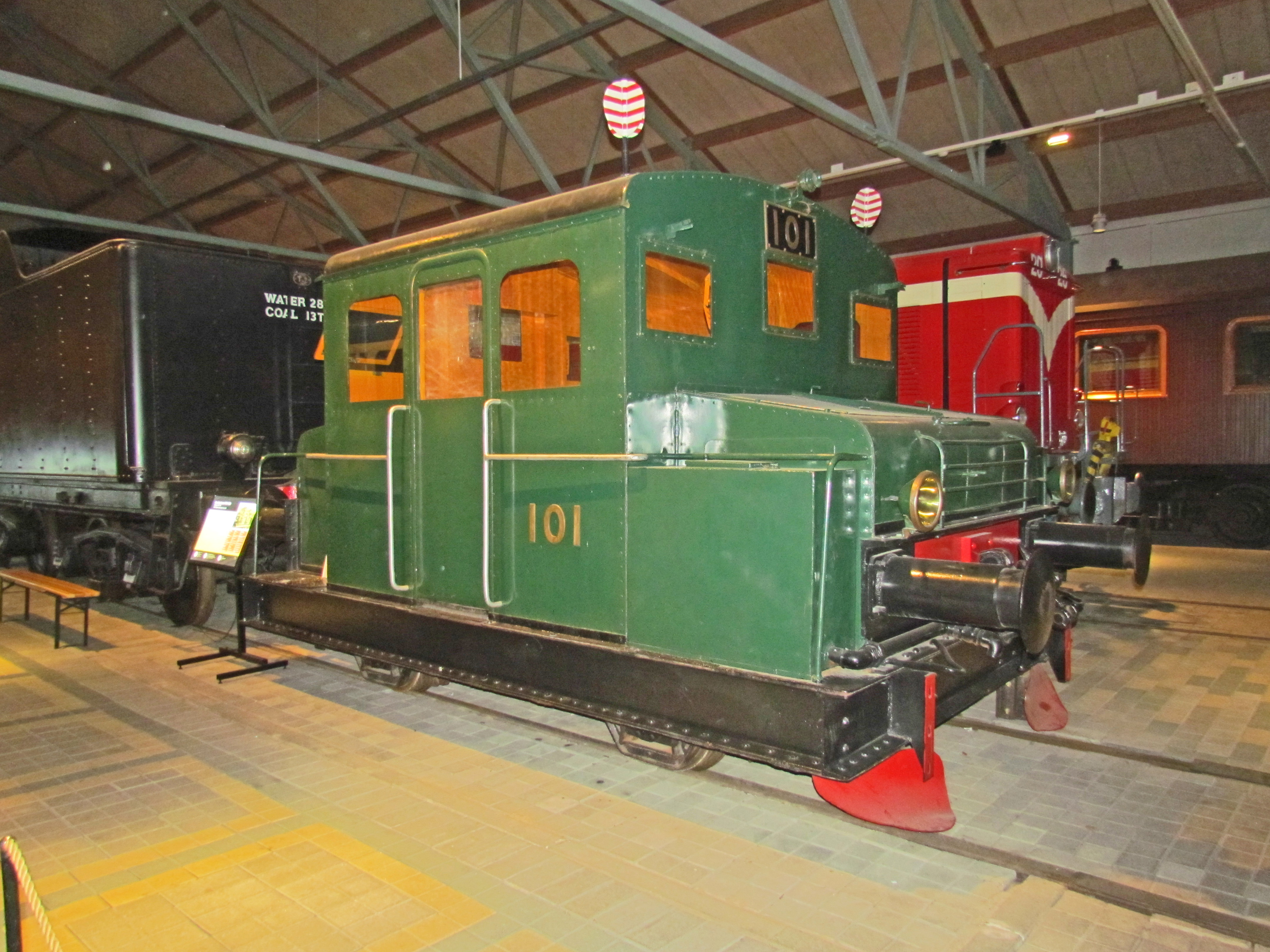
- VR Class Vk11 Petrol-paraffin shunting locomotive at the Finnish Railway Museum
Type and origin
- Power type: Paraffin locomotive
- Builder: Ab Slipmaterial, Västervik (nro 101), ja Lokomo Oy, Tampere (nro 102)
- Serial number: 101, 102
- Build date: 1930, 1936
- Total produced: 2
Specifications
- Configuration
  - AAR: B
  - UIC: B
- Gauge: 1,524 mm (5 ft)
- Wheel diameter: 600 mm (2 ft 0 in)
- Fuel type: Petrol-paraffin
- Transmission: mechanical
Performance figures
- Maximum speed: 30 km/h (19 mph)
Career
- Operators: VR Group
- First run: 1931
- Withdrawn: 1969
- Disposition: No 101 is preserved at the Finnish Railway Museum

The VR Class Vk11 No 101 locomotive was purchased for testing on a six-mile stretch of track between Vuokatti and Sotkamo, where the use of steam locomotives had proved to be uneconomical due to low traffic. The locomotive was ordered from the Swedish act called Ab Slipmaterial of Sweden, and it was completed in 1930. The locomotive had a six-litre Wisconsin petrol-paraffin internal-combustion engine. In January 1931 the locomotive was delivered to Finland, it initially received the number Mt 101. Another very similar locomotive was ordered home in 1935. It was built by Lokomo in Finland and had an 80 hp paraffin Andros petrol-paraffin engine. It initially received the number Mt 102. In 1953 locomotive class designation was changed to Vk11, and in 1962 they were renumbered again to Tve-ko1 and Tve-ko2. Vk11 locomotives were broadly similar to each other, but there were a number of detail differences. Both were two-axle and weighing 12 tons. Both had engines that ran on kerosene / paraffin as fuel but required gasoline / petrol to start them. Locomotives had different lengths of 5.6 m and 6.0 m. Locomotive Vk11 No. 101 was tested on Vuokatti-Sotkamo line for four months. When the passenger rail in this case was discontinued, it was transferred to the locomotive workshop in Oulu on internal traffic. In 1935, the locomotive was placed in a shunting yard in Siuro. After that the locomotive was used at Vaasa and the workshop at Oulu as a shunter. The locomotive was withdrawn in 1962.

== Numbering, Duration of Operation and Manufacturer ==
Locomotive Number	Year built	Year Withdrawn	Manufacturer
101	1930	1962	Ab Slipmaterial, Västervik
102	1936	1969	Lokomo Oy, Tampere

== See also ==
- Finnish Railway Museum
- VR Group
- List of Finnish locomotives
- List of railway museums Worldwide
- Heritage railways
- List of heritage railways
- Restored trains
- Jokioinen Museum Railway
- History of rail transport in Finland

== Gallery ==
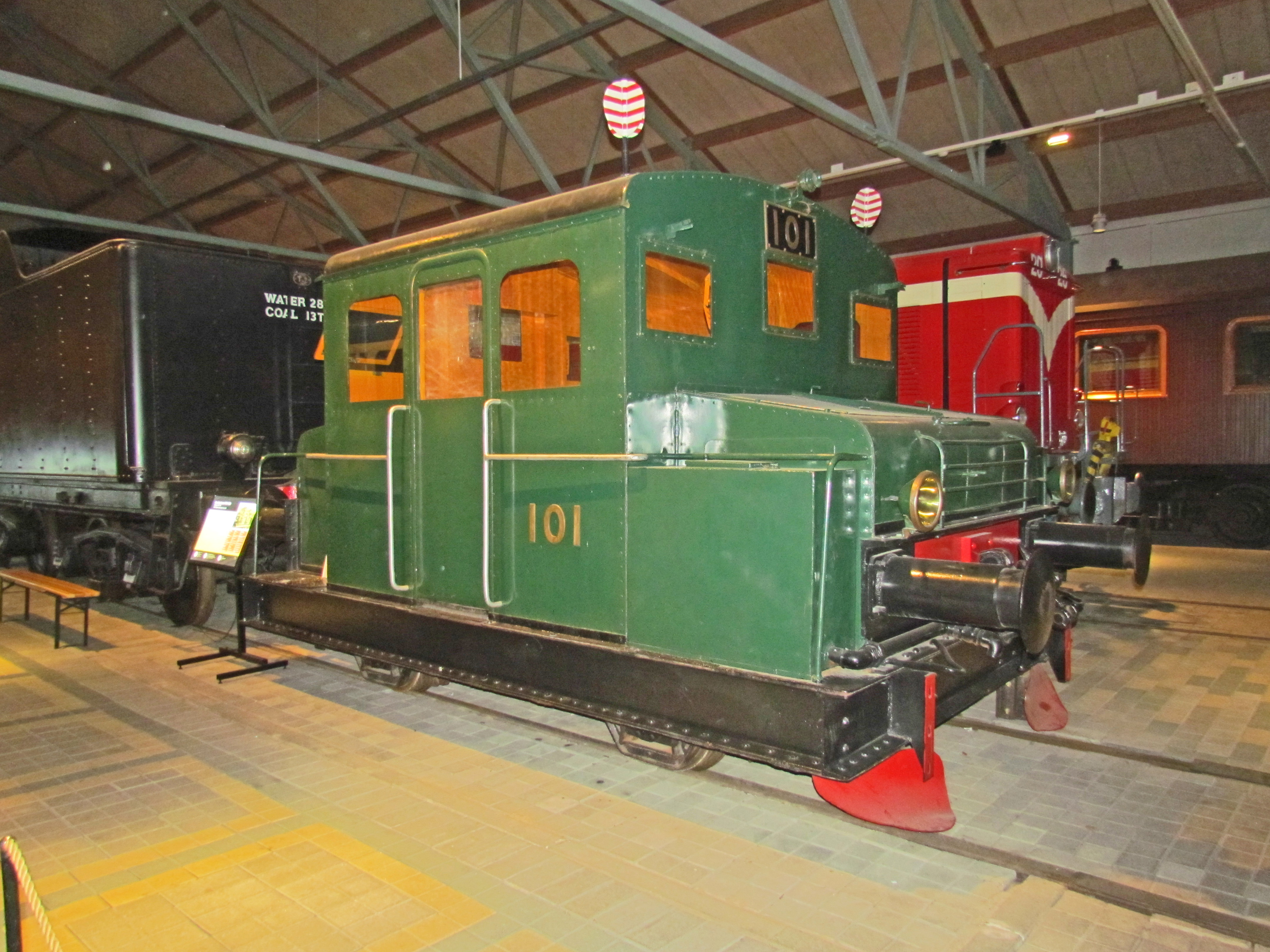
VR Class Vk11 Petrol-paraffin shunting locomotive at the Finnish Railway Museum

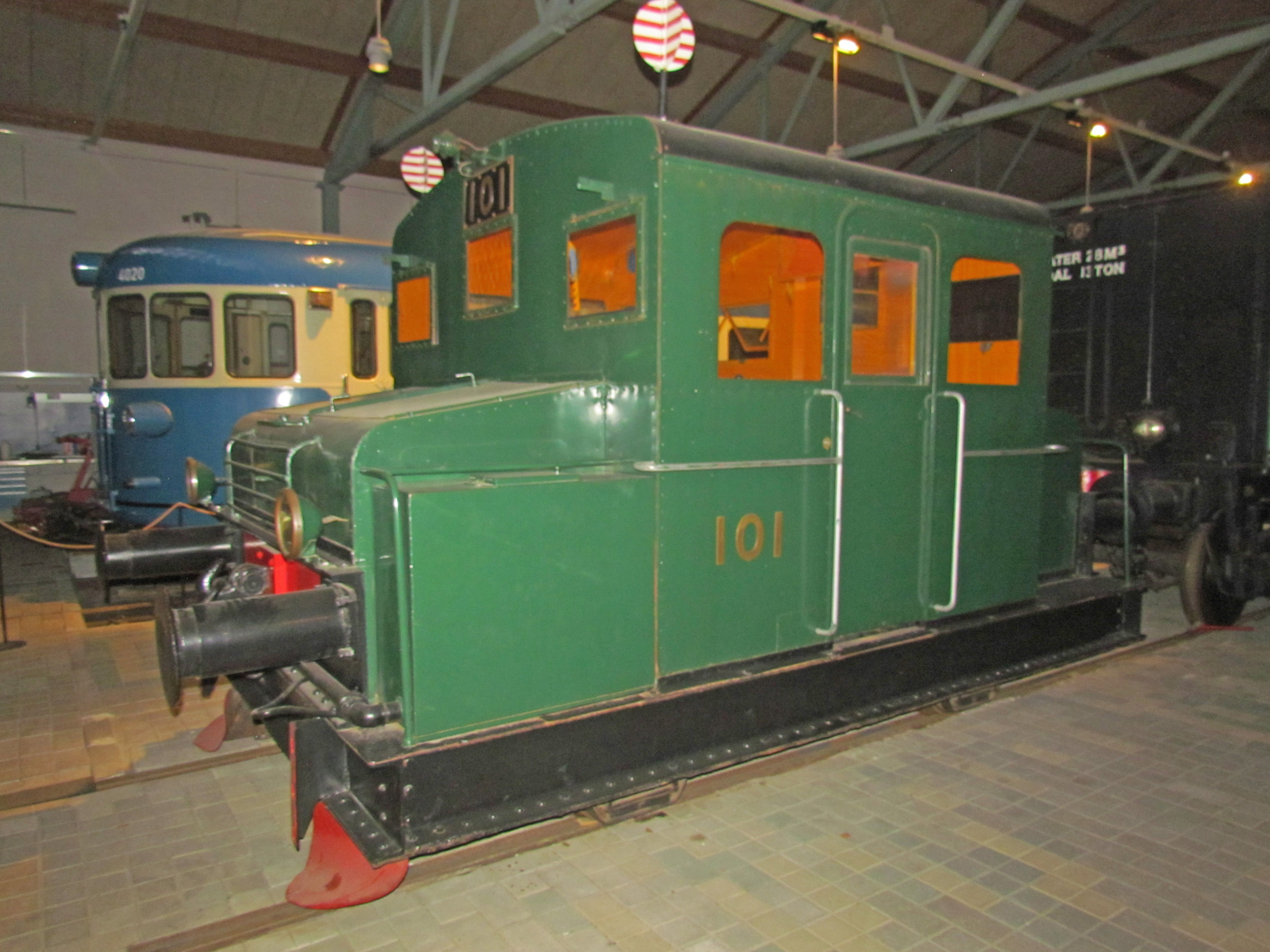
VR Class Vk11 Petrol-paraffin shunting locomotive at the Finnish Railway Museum
