= VR Class Ds1 =

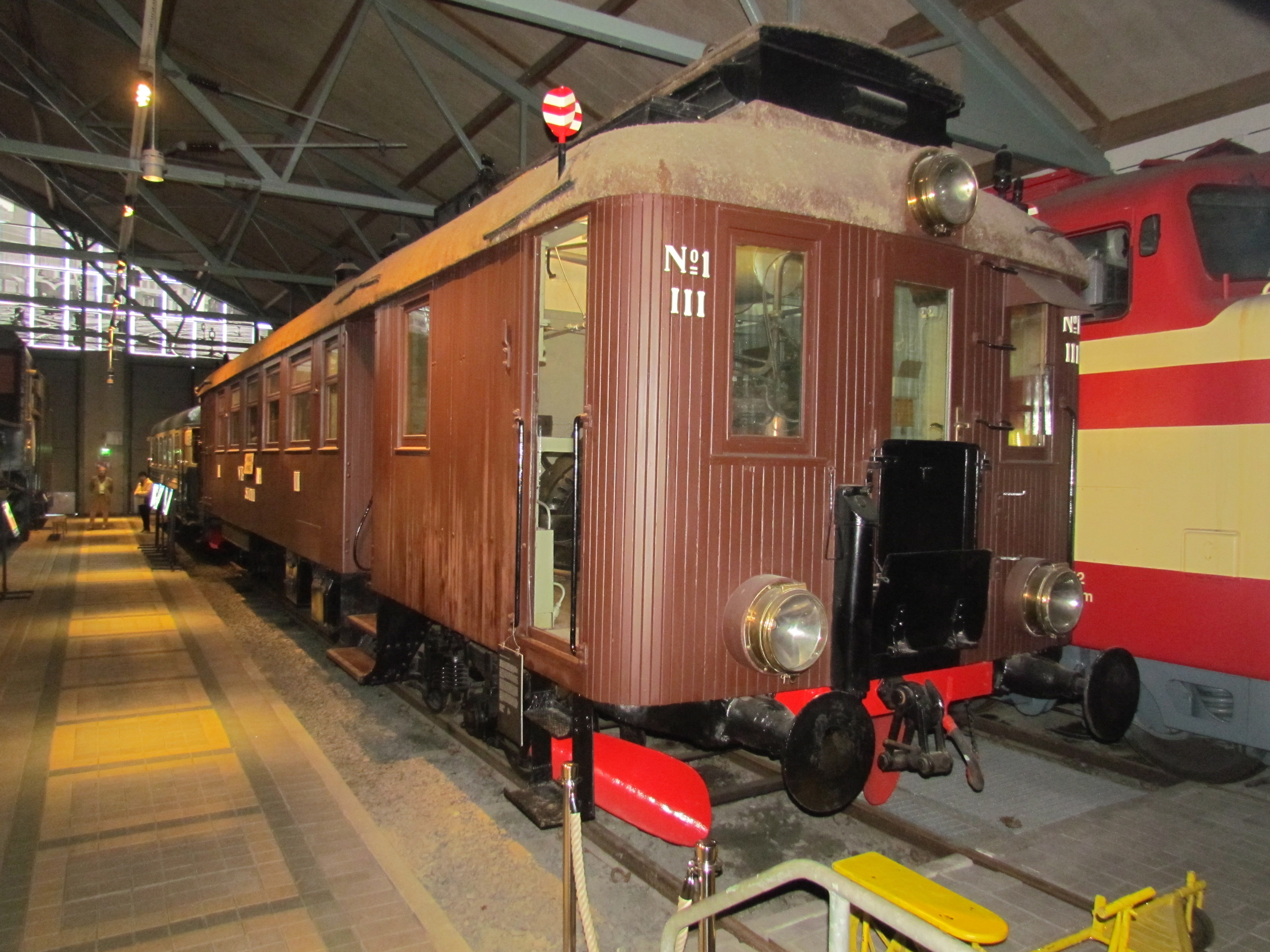
- VR Class Ds1 railcar at the Finnish Railway Museum
- In service: 1928–1955
- Manufacturer: VR Pasilan Konepaja
- Constructed: 1928, 1930
- Number built: 3
- Number preserved: 1 (in the Finnish Railway Museum)
- Fleet numbers: 1, 4 and 5
- Operators: VR Group

Specifications
- Car length: 16.330 m (53 ft 7 in)
- Wheel diameter: 960 mm (3 ft 2 in)
- Weight: 33.2 tonnes (32.7 long tons; 36.6 short tons)
- Axle load: 11.4 tonnes (11.2 long tons; 12.6 short tons)
- Prime mover(s): Diesel
- Power output: 90 kW (120 hp)
- Transmission: Diesel-electric
- UIC classification: (1A)(A1)
- Track gauge: 1,524 mm (5 ft)

Notes/references
- information from

The VR Class Ds1 Also known as "Puumotti" (Roughly translated to Wood Cubic meter "motti" being a means to measure wood volume) was the first railbus of the Finnish State Railways. It was ordered in 1927. The Ds1 was built by the Pasila workshop, but the automotive parts including the engine were supplied by the Swedish company DEVA. Ds1 has a diesel engine and an electric drive, with a diesel generator providing power to the wheels. A cab is at either end of the vehicle, so that the vehicle did not have to be turned at terminal stations. The vehicle consisted of a motor room, a luggage compartment, and a 3rd class passenger compartment bare on a wooden bench seating.

The Finnish State Railways started ordering Diesel multiple units and railcars, as road transport began to compete with rail passenger services. To compete with car and bus services the state railway added a number of train services and intermediate halts to its network. The use of steam locomotives on quiet railway lines would have been inappropriate, and the associated costs would have been too high.

The last Ds1 was withdrawn in 1955, the same year as the first VR Class Dm7 was completed.

== Numbering and Duration of Operation ==
Locomotive Number	Year built	Year Withdrawn
1	1928	1955
4	1930	1953
5	1930	1952

== See also ==
- Finnish Railway Museum
- VR Group
- List of Finnish locomotives
- List of railway museums Worldwide
- Heritage railways
- List of heritage railways
- Restored trains
- Jokioinen Museum Railway
- History of rail transport in Finland

== Gallery ==
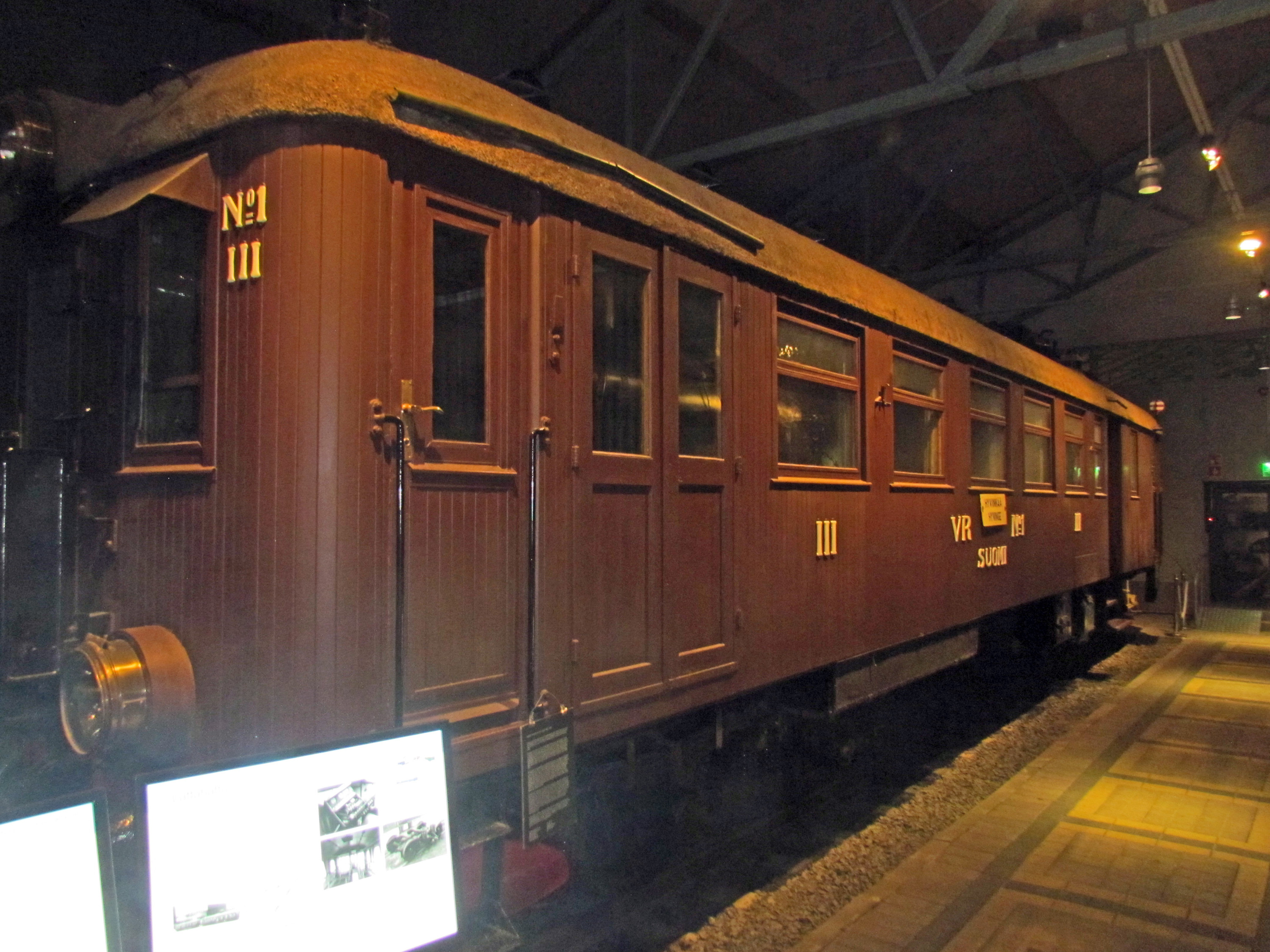
VR Class Ds1 railcar at the Finnish Railway Museum

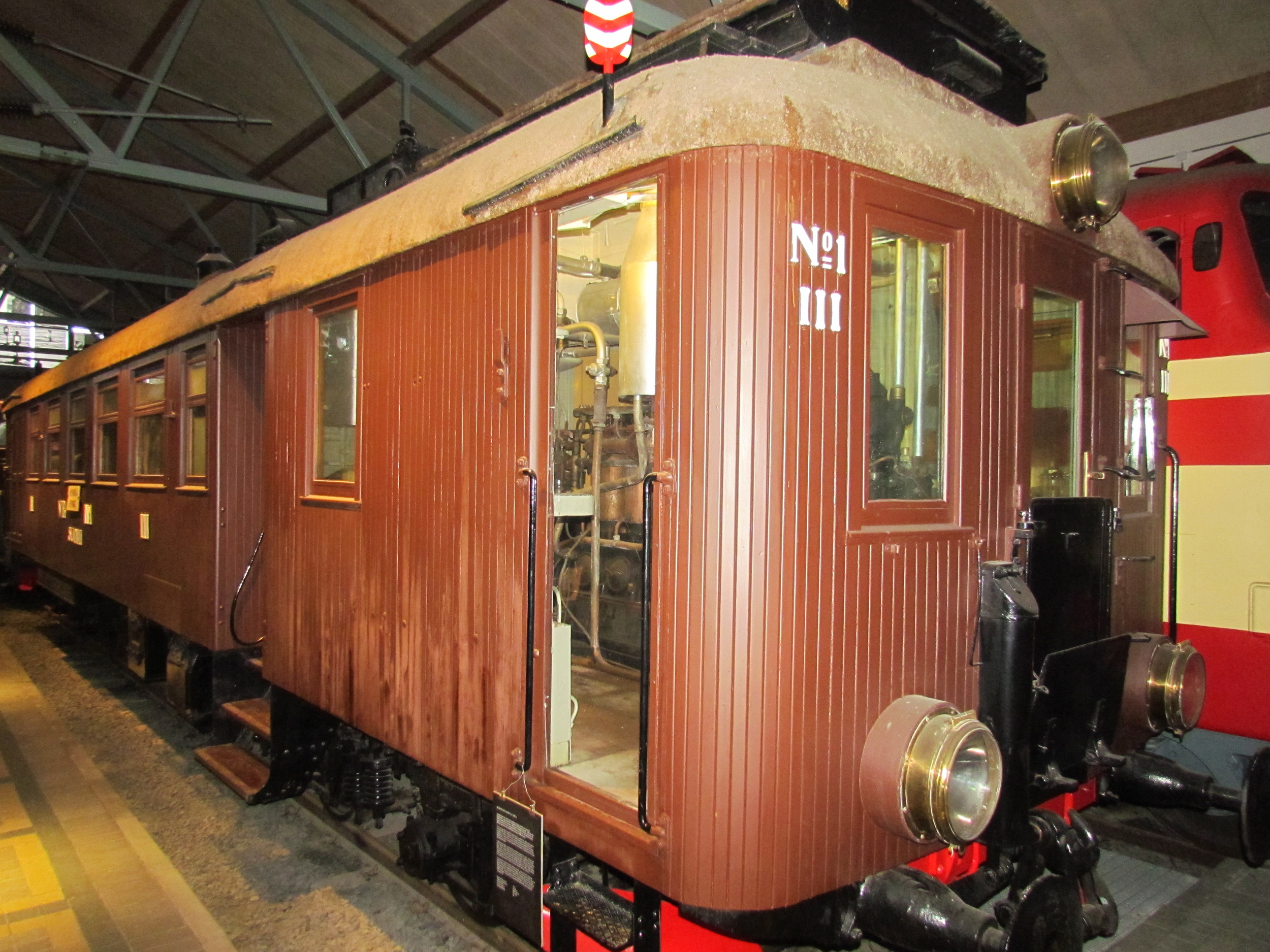
VR Class Ds1 railcar at the Finnish Railway Museum

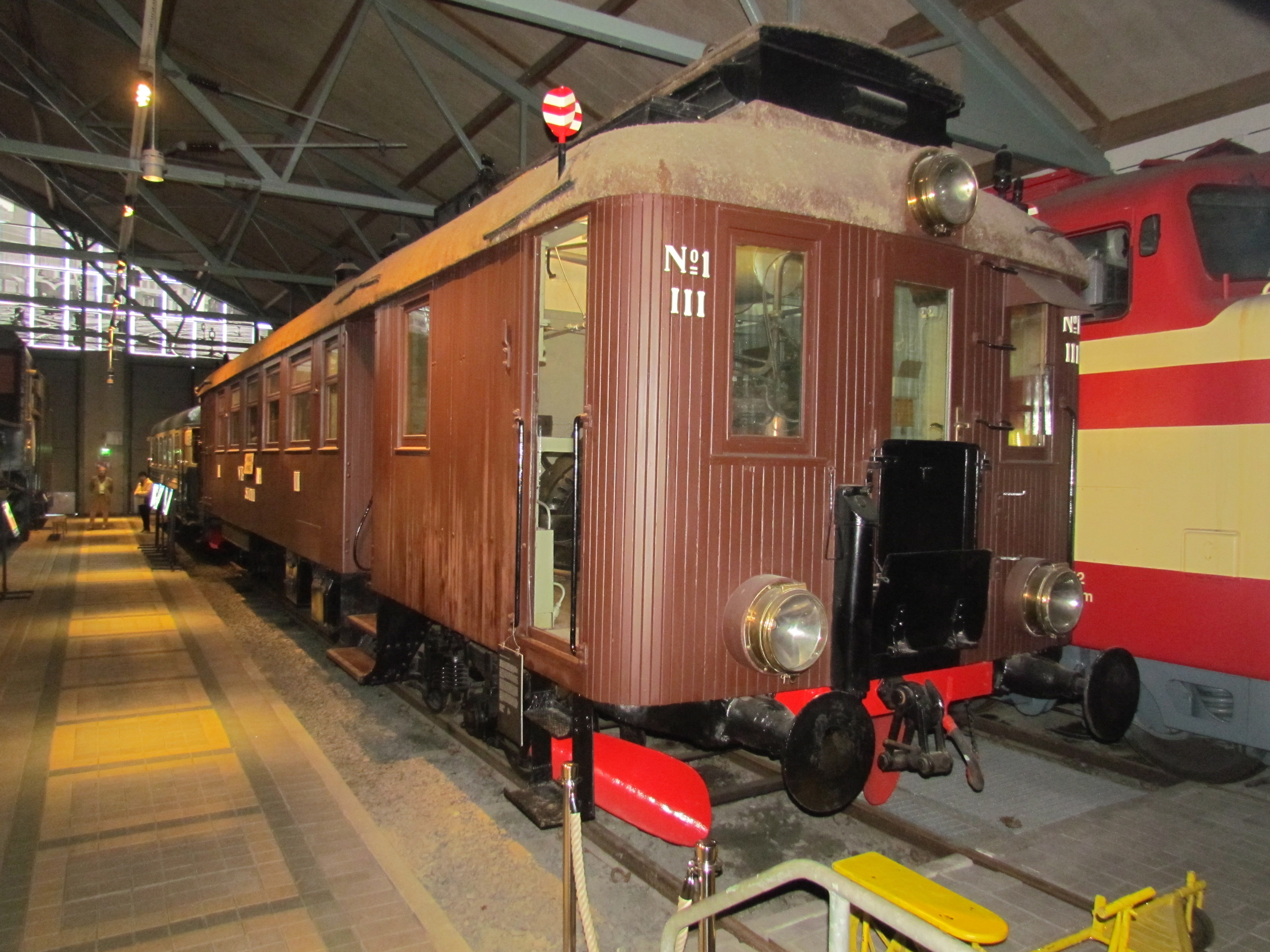
VR Class Ds1 railcar at the Finnish Railway Museum

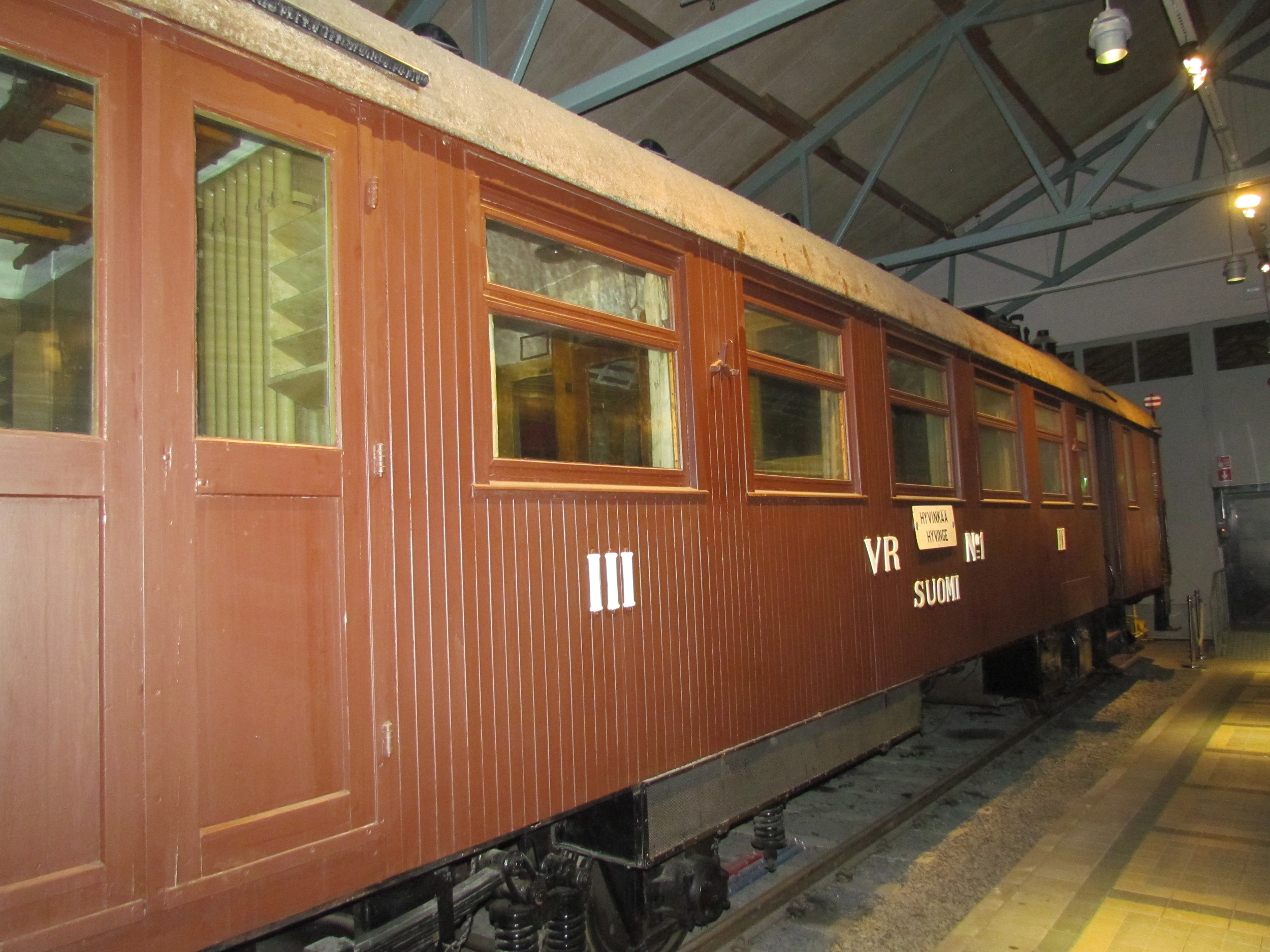
VR Class Ds1 railcar at the Finnish Railway Museum
