= VR Class Tve2 =

Diesel shunting locomotive

Tve2
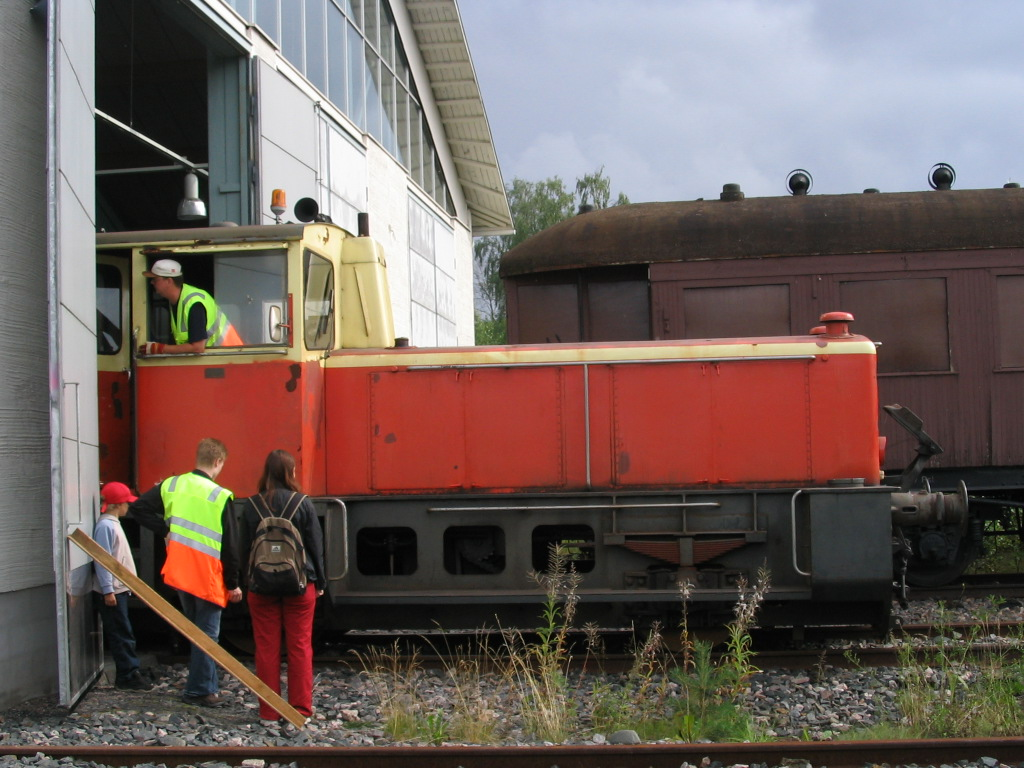
- OTSO2 series locomotive at the Finnish Railway Museum
Type and origin
- Power type: Diesel
- Builder: Saalasti Oy
- Serial number: 441–448
- Build date: 1962–64
- Total produced: 8
Specifications
- Gauge: 1,524 mm (5 ft)
- Driver dia.: 960 mm
- Wheelbase: 3.100 m
- Length: 7.150 m
- Axle load: 13.3 t (locomotives 441 and 448 14 t)
- Loco weight: 26.6 t (locomotives 441 and 448 28.0 t)
- Fuel type: Diesel
- Prime mover: Deutz F12L-714
Performance figures
- Maximum speed: 45 km/h (locomotives 441 and 448 20 km/h)
- Power output: 175 hp
Career
- Withdrawn: 1990
- Disposition: One preserved at the Finnish Railway Museum

VR Class Tve2 was a VR Group diesel shunting locomotive. They were ordered from the Saalasti Oy engineering company and built between 1962 and 1964. Locomotives was sent to the Turenki sugar factory. A total of 8 units. The manufacturer's designation for the model was OTSO2 and OTSO2/VR.

== History ==
When the VR Class Tve1 locomotives proved to be inadequate in some lineside / traffic applications VR Group decided to order seven similar shunting locomotives from Saalasti Oy. These were more efficient locomotives. One of these was the existing manufacturer's model OTSO2, which it had been supplied to some of the industrial plants. While the further six locomotives were designated OTSO2/VR. The locomotives were delivered during 1964. In 1976 VR Group acquired a further used OTSO2 locomotive, which had previously been used by Kaukas Oy Ab at Lappeenranta. The purchase included a refurbished cabin.

== Technology ==
Tve2 locomotives were configured and sized almost exactly the same as Vr Group Tve1 locomotives. The biggest differences were that the Tve2s were heavier and more efficient Deutz AG 175 hp air-cooled diesel engine. Locomotives numbers 441 and 448 are the only series OTSO2-type locomotives, to differ from the others. They had a different transmission, which gave them a maximum speed of only 20 km/h, when the others have 45 km/h. Some of the locomotives later reported a maximum speed of 50 km/h.

== Use ==
Tve2 locomotives were used mainly in the workshops and depots as well as in public transport hubs, where Tve1's power would have been insufficient. VR Group withdrew all Tve2 locomotives by the 1990s. Last VR Group's Tve2 worked in the North Kuru. One is preserved at the Finnish Railway Museum in Hyvinkää.

== See also ==
- Finnish Railway Museum
- VR Group
- List of Finnish locomotives
- List of railway museums Worldwide
- Heritage railways
- List of heritage railways
- Restored trains
- Jokioinen Museum Railway
- History of rail transport in Finland
