= SK3 =

SK3 may refer to:

- Folkerts SK-3, 1937 racing aircraft
- KCNN3, protein found in humans
- Plesetsk Cosmodrome Site 43, Russian rocket launch site
- Storekeeper, third class of U.S. military rank
- VR Class Sk3, class of Finnish locomotives
