= RRO (disambiguation) =

RRO may refer to:

- Rent Repayment Order, an order in the United Kingdom that allows a tenant or local authority to reclaim rent or housing benefit
- VR Class Rro, a type of narrow gauge locomotive
- Repeatable runout, see patterned media
- Radial run-out, see tire uniformity
- Waima language, by ISO 639 code
- Reproduction rights organisation, a type of performance rights organisation
