= VR Class Rro =

Class of Finnish steam locomotives

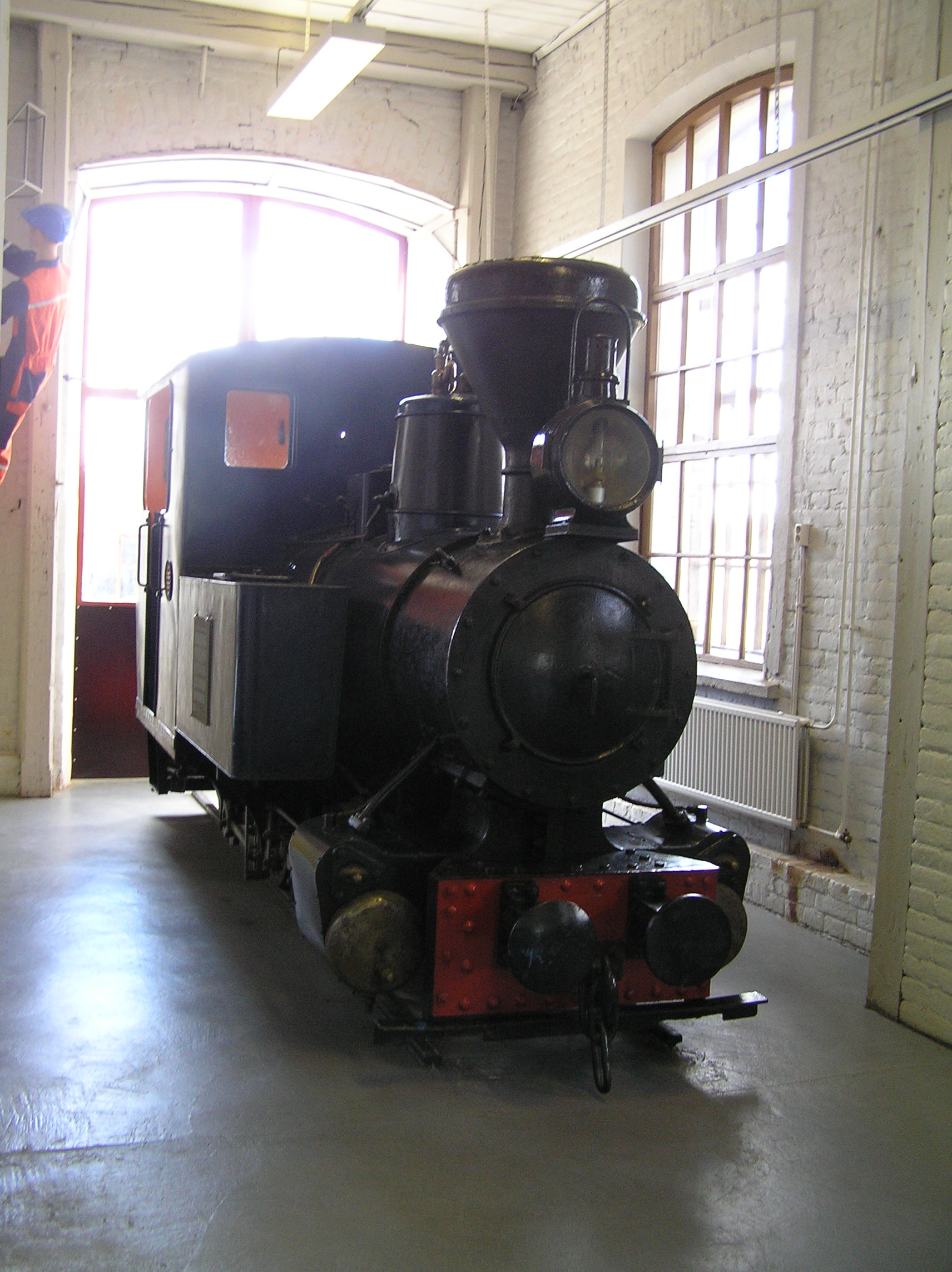
- Class Rro 0-4-0T Narrow Gauge locomotive in the Finnish Railway Museum.
Type and origin
- Power type: Steam
- Builder: Tampella Tampereen Pellava- ja Rautateollisuus Oy
- Order number: 230
- Serial number: 1,2
- Build date: 1914
- Total produced: 2
Specifications
- Configuration
  - Whyte: 0-4-0T
- Gauge: 600 mm (1 ft 11 5/8 in)
- Loco weight: 9 tons (empty weight)
Career
- Operators: VR Group, Finland
- Nicknames: “Yumeno”
- First run: 1914
- Disposition: One preserved (No. 2), at the Finnish Railway Museum
- information from and

VR Class Rro was a locomotive of Finnish origin. The Rro portion of the name comes from a word RautatieRakennusOsasto which is the Railway Construction Department.

The narrow gauge locomotive Rro 2 which is at the Finnish Railway Museum was originally used by TVH (the road engineering board) and numbered as TVH locomotive 5. Later (probably in 1926) it was transferred to VR Group and numbered 2 by the VR Railway Construction Department. The VR Railway Construction Department was established in the early 1920s.

== Gallery ==
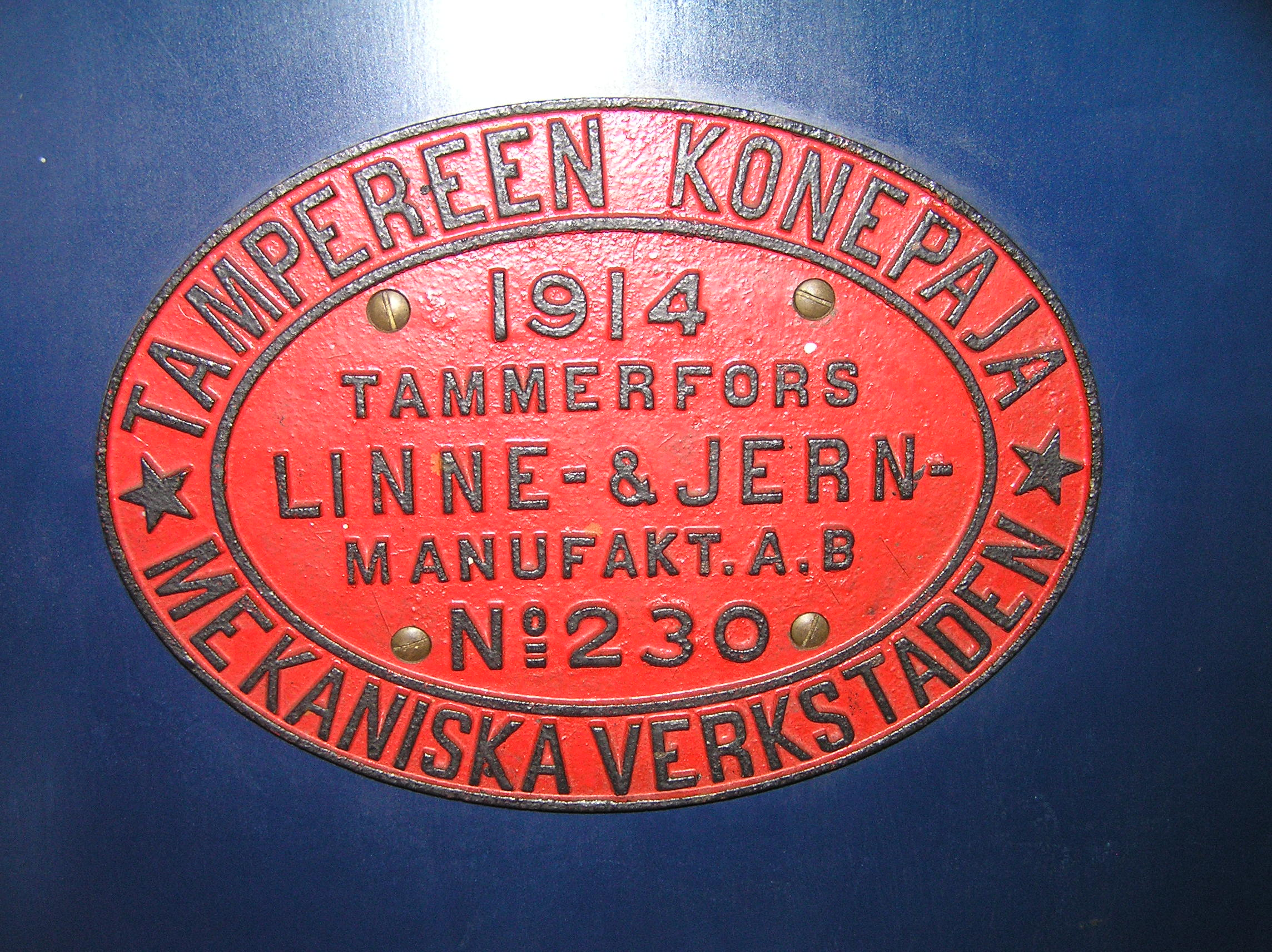
Builder's Plate of Narrow Gauge Finnish Steam Locomotive RRO 2

== See also ==
- Finnish Railway Museum
- VR Group
- List of Finnish locomotives
- List of railway museums Worldwide
- Heritage railways
- List of heritage railways
- Restored trains
- Jokioinen Museum Railway
- History of rail transport in Finland
