= Finnish Railway Museum =

- Suomen Rautatiemuseo
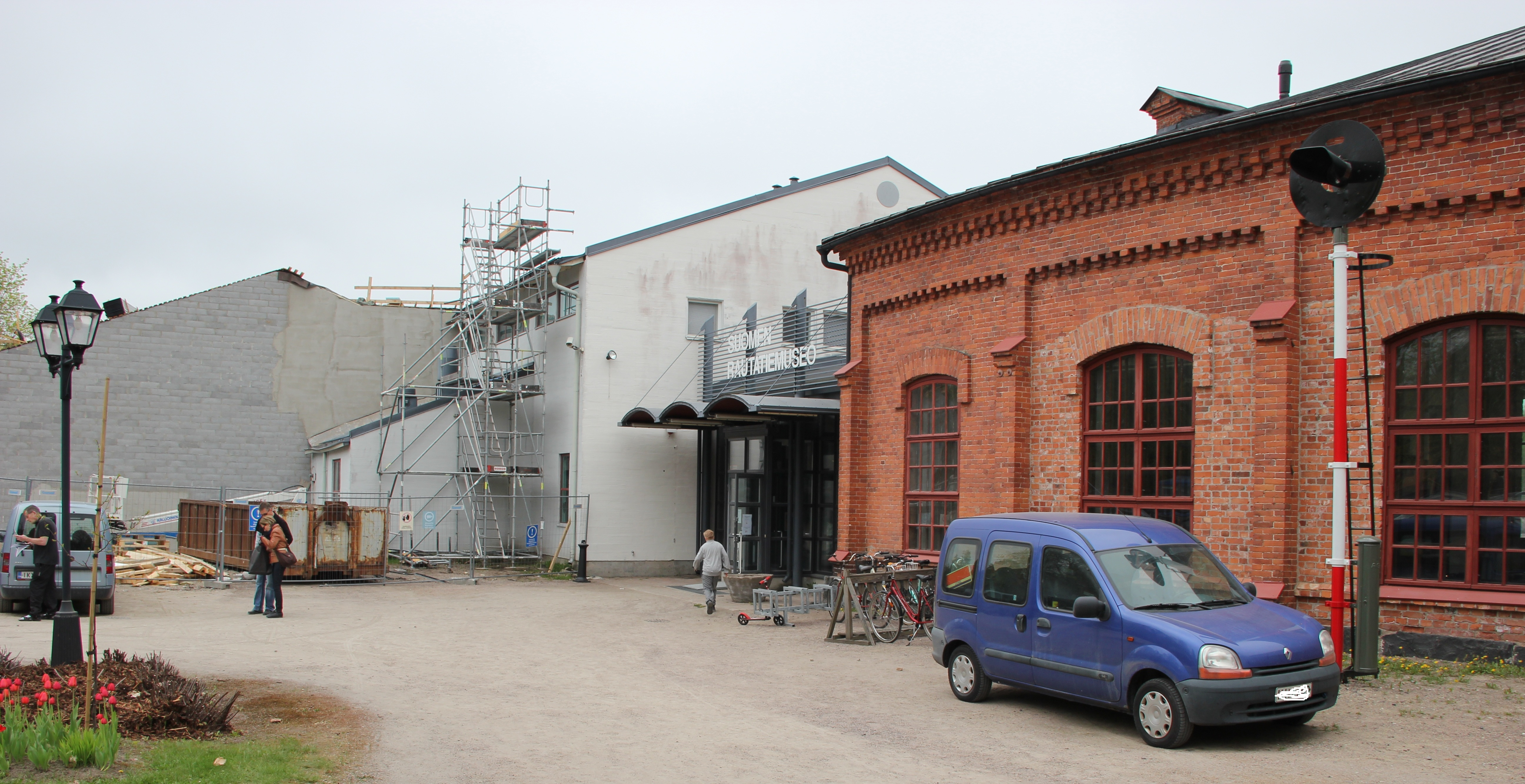
- Established: 1898
- Location: Hyvinkää, Finland
- Coordinates: 60°37′35″N 024°51′03″E
- Type: Railway museum
- Director: Tiina Lehtinen
- Owner: Rautatiemuseon Säätiö
- Website: rautatiemuseo.fi

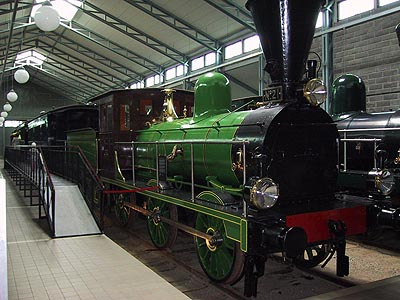
C1 at the museum in 2006

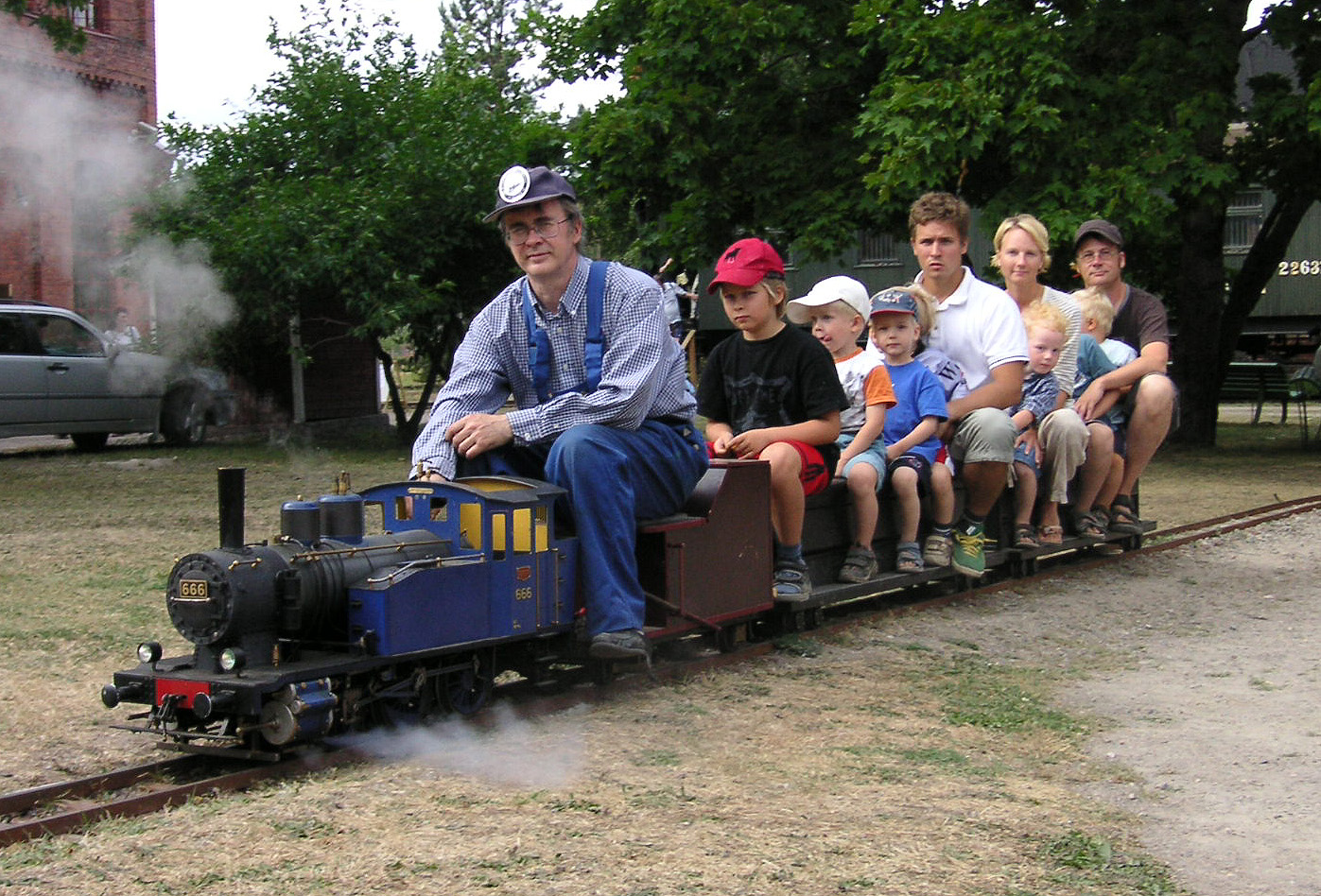
A propane-fired 1:8 scale live steam train running on the Finnish Railway Museum's 7.25-inch (18.4 cm) gauge track

The Finnish Railway Museum (Finnish: Suomen Rautatiemuseo) is a railway museum located in Hyvinkää, Finland. It was founded in Helsinki in 1898. The museum was moved to Hyvinkää in 1974.

The museum is on the former station and yard site of the Hanko–Hyvinkää railway. In addition to the station building, there is a roundhouse and several other preserved buildings, mainly from the 1870s. The museum also has a live steam backyard railroad track, where train rides are offered to the public during special run days in the summer months.

== Exhibits ==
Image	Class	Number	Wheel arrangement	Type	Manufacturer	Serial number	Built	Notes (including nicknames)
	A5	58	4-4-0	Passenger steam locomotive	Helsingfors / VRHki Valtionrautatiet, Helsingin konepaja	2	1875	"Lankkihattu"
	B1	9	0-4-2ST	Shunting steam locomotive	Beyer, Peacock & Company	846	1868	The oldest preserved locomotive in Finland, "Ram"
	C1	21	0-6-0	Freight steam locomotive	Neilson & Company	1427	1869	The second oldest preserved locomotive in Finland, "Bristollari"
	C5	110	0-6-0	Freight steam locomotive	Hanomag	1477	1882	"Bliksti"
	Sk1	124	2-6-0	Mixed-traffic steam locomotive	Swiss Locomotive & Machine Works	405	1885	"Little Brown"
	F1	132	0-4-4RT	Passenger steam locomotive	Swiss Locomotive & Machine Works	434	1886	"Felix"
	Vk3	489	2-6-4T	Local passenger steam locomotive	Tampella Tampereen Pellava- ja Rautateollisuus Oy		1909	"Iita"
	VR Class Hv1	555	4-6-0	Passenger steam locomotive	Tampella Tampereen Pellava- ja Rautateollisuus Oy	264	1915	"Heikki", this specific locomotive was nicknamed "Princess"
	VR Class Pr1	776	2-8-2T	Local Passenger Steam Locomotive	Tampella Tampereen Pellava- ja Rautateollisuus Oy		1926	"Paikku"
	Sk3	49	2-6-0	Mixed Traffic Locomotive	Tampella Tampereen Pellava- ja Rautateollisuus Oy No 49	400	1903	"Grandmother"
	VR Class Tr1	1033	2-8-2	Freight Steam Locomotive	Tampella Tampereen Pellava- ja Rautateollisuus Oy	503	1941	"Risto"
	VR Class Tr1	1096	2-8-2	Freight Steam Locomotive	Tampella Tampereen Pellava- ja Rautateollisuus Oy	972	1957	"Risto", No 1096 stored
	VR Class Tr2	1319	2-10-0	Heavy Freight Steam Locomotive	ALCO	75214	1947	Nicknamed "Truman". Similar to Russian locomotive class Ye
	VR Class Vk4	68	0-4-0T	Light Replacement Steam Locomotive	Borsig Lokomotiv Werke (AEG)		1910	"Leena", Oldest working broad gauge locomotive in Finland
	VR Class Vr1	669	0-6-0T	Shunting Steam Locomotive	Hannoversche Maschinenbau	10264	1923	"Hen"
	VR Class Vr3	755	0-10-0T	Steam Locomotive	Tampella Tampereen Pellava- ja Rautateollisuus Oy		1926	"Rooster" / "Cockerel", stored
	VR Class Rro	2		Narrow Gauge Steam locomotive	Tampella Tampereen Pellava- ja Rautateollisuus Oy	230	1914	
	VR Class Tve2 (OTSO2)	8		Small Shunting Engine	Saalasti Oy		1962–1964	
	VR Class Dr12	2241	C'C'	Diesel-electric locomotive	Valmet / Terex			The Dr12 was known as the Hr12 until 1976, "Huru"
	VR Class Dr13	2349	C'C'	Diesel-electric locomotive	Alstom, Lokomo, Valmet			“Alsti”, “Alstikka”, “Alspommi”, “Myymäläauto” (“Mobile shop")
	VR Class Hr11	1950	B'B'	Diesel Locomotive	Valmet		1955	stored
	VR Class Vk11	101	B	Petrol-paraffin locomotive	Ab Slipmaterial, Västervik		1930	
	VR Class Dm7	4020	(1A)(A1)	Diesel Multiple Unit	Valmet Oy Lentokonetehdas, Tampere (under license from Hilding Carlssons Mekaniska Verkstad, Umeå, Sweden)	68		
	VR Class Ds1	1	1A A1	Diesel Multiple Unit	VR Pasilan Konepaja	3	1928	

== See also ==
- Jokioinen Museum Railway
- Hanko–Hyvinkää railway
