= Finnish Steam Locomotive Class B1 =

Class of Finnish steam locomotives

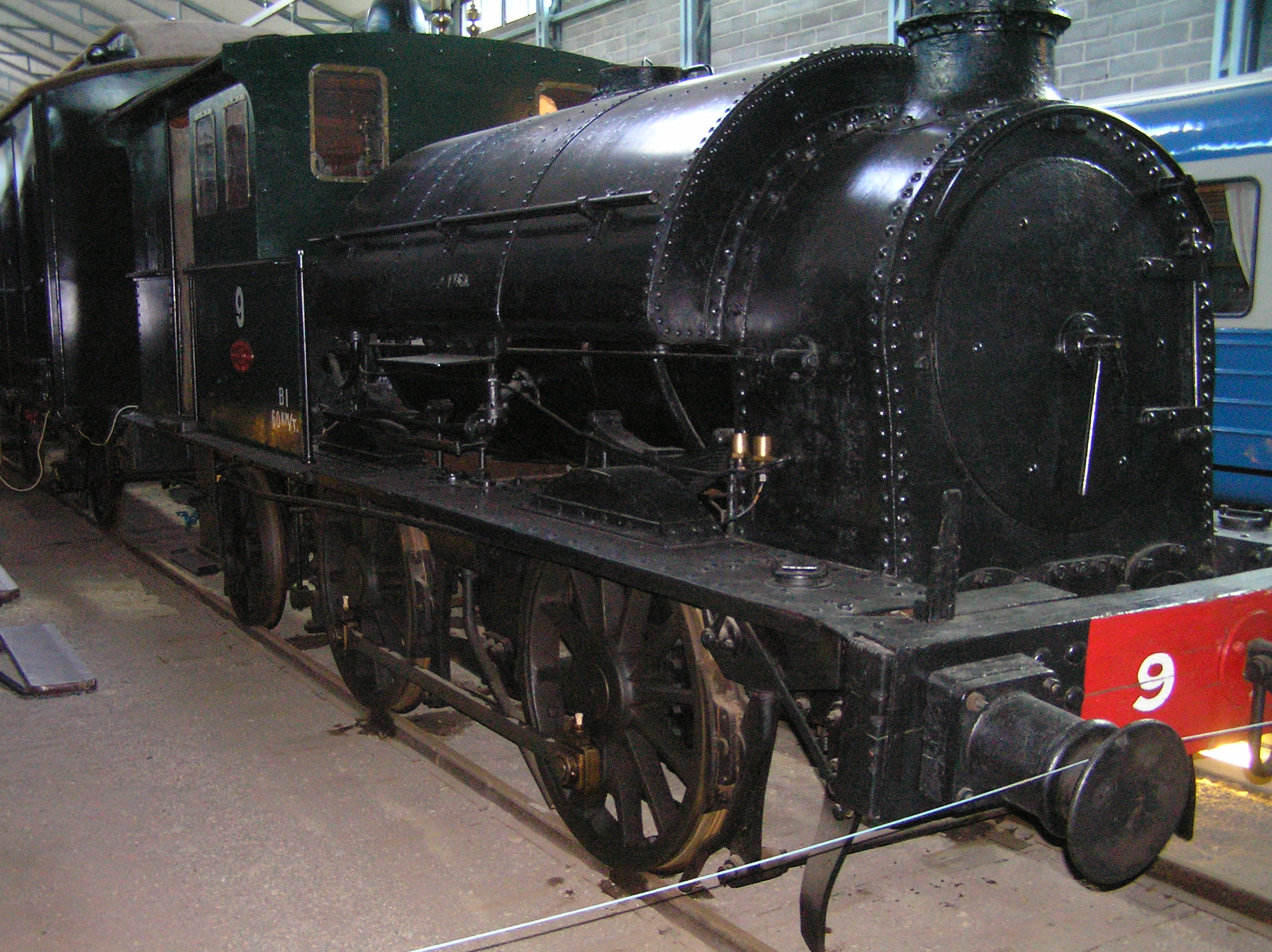
- Class B1 Nº 9 at the Finnish Railway Museum
Type and origin
- Power type: Steam
- Builder: Beyer, Peacock & Company
- Serial number: 846, 847, 1334, 1511–1513, 1970, 3208–3209
- Build date: 1868–1890
- Total produced: 9
Specifications
- Configuration
  - Whyte: 0-4-2ST
  - UIC: B1 n2t
- Gauge: 1,524 mm (5 ft)
- Loco weight: 26.4 tonnes (26.0 long tons; 29.1 short tons)
- Water cap.: 2,900 litres (640 imp gal; 770 US gal)
- Firebox
  - Grate area: 0.95 m^{2} (10.2 sq ft)
- Heating surface: 62.7 m^{2} (675 sq ft)
Performance figures
- Maximum speed: 60 km/h (37 mph)
Career
- Numbers: 9–10, 53–56, 150–151
- Nicknames: Ram
- First run: 1868
- Withdrawn: 1928
- Disposition: 1 preserved, 9 scrapped

The Finnish Steam Locomotive Class B1 is an 0-4-2ST built by Beyer, Peacock & Company, at its Gorton Foundry in Manchester, England. Nine were constructed between 1868 and 1890. They were designed for use as shunting locomotives.

Number 9 is Finland's oldest preserved locomotive and is preserved at the Finnish Railway Museum. The B1 was nicknamed “Ram”. They were numbered 9–10, 53–56, 150–151. B1 locomotives were withdrawn in the 1920s. The last was withdrawn in 1928.
