= Finnish Steam Locomotive Class C1 =

Class of Finnish steam locomotives

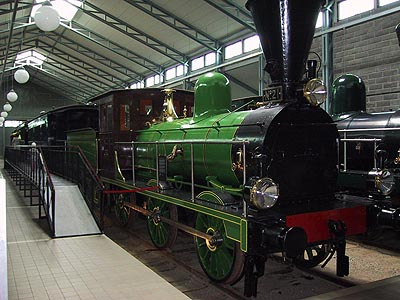
- Class C1 Nº 21 in the Finnish Railway Museum
Type and origin
- Power type: Steam
- Builder: Neilson & Company
- Serial number: 1427-1436
- Build date: 1869
- Total produced: 10
Specifications
- Configuration
  - Whyte: 0-6-0
- Gauge: 1,524 mm (5 ft)
- Driver dia.: 1,250 mm (49.21 in)
- Length: 12.77 m (41 ft 10 3/4 in)
- Axle load: 9.2 t (9.1 long tons; 10.1 short tons)
- Loco weight: 26.2 t (25.8 long tons; 28.9 short tons) + 15.8 t (15.6 long tons; 17.4 short tons)
- Fuel capacity: Coal: 5 m^{3} (180 cu ft) / 4 t (3.9 long tons; 4.4 short tons); Wood: 5.7 m^{3} (200 cu ft)
- Water cap.: 5.5 m^{3} (190 cu ft)
- Firebox
  - Grate area: 1.15 m^{2} (12.4 sq ft)
- Boiler pressure: 8.5 kp/cm^{2} (830 kPa; 121 psi)
- Heating surface: 83.4 m^{2} (898 sq ft)
Performance figures
- Maximum speed: 60 km/h (37 mph)
- Tractive effort: 3,200 kp (31 kN; 7,100 lb_{f})
Career
- Numbers: 21–30
- Nicknames: Bristollari ("the Bristolian")
- First run: 1869
- Withdrawn: 1926–1929
- Disposition: One preserved (No. 21), at the Finnish Railway Museum, remainder scrapped

The Class C1 Steam Locomotives were introduced in 1868 for use in the Grand Duchy of Finland, then an autonomous region of the Russian Empire. Built by Neilson & Company in Glasgow, Scotland, these locomotives reflected the design principles of Victorian-era British 0-6-0 freight engines. They featured inside cylinders and Stephenson link motion. Modifications such as wood-burning smokestacks and wooden cab sides were made to suit Finnish conditions.

The Class C1 locomotives share similarities with several British locomotive classes, including the NER Class C1, Caledonian Railway 294 and 711 Classes, Caledonian Railway 812 and 652 Classes, LB&SCR C class, and SER O class. Neilson & Company also supplied similar 5-foot-gauge 0-6-0 locomotives to other railways across the Russian Empire. However, limited photographic and technical documentation of these models remains.

Only one locomotive of this class, No. 1427, is preserved today and is housed at the Finnish Railway Museum. It is the only known surviving example of the many 0-6-0 locomotives once used throughout the Russian Empire during the 19th century. Another unit, No. 30, remained in Finland Station, St. Petersburg, in 1918 during the civil conflicts in Finland and Russia. The wood-burning smoke stacks and wooden cab sides were installed for Finnish conditions.

No. 1427, which carried running number 21, is the second-oldest preserved locomotive in Finland, following the 1868 Beyer, Peacock & Company 0-4-2T. It was the first freight locomotive used by the Finnish State Railways (then known as SVR). It was also the first of a batch of ten locomotives (builder's numbers 1427–1436, running numbers 21–30) delivered for the Riihimäki–Saint Petersburg railway in 1869. These locomotives later operated on routes to Helsinki and Turku. No. 1427 was retired in 1926, and the last locomotive of the class was withdrawn in 1929.

== See also ==
- Finnish Railway Museum
- VR Group
- List of Finnish locomotives
- Jokioinen Museum Railway
- History of rail transport in Finland

== Gallery ==
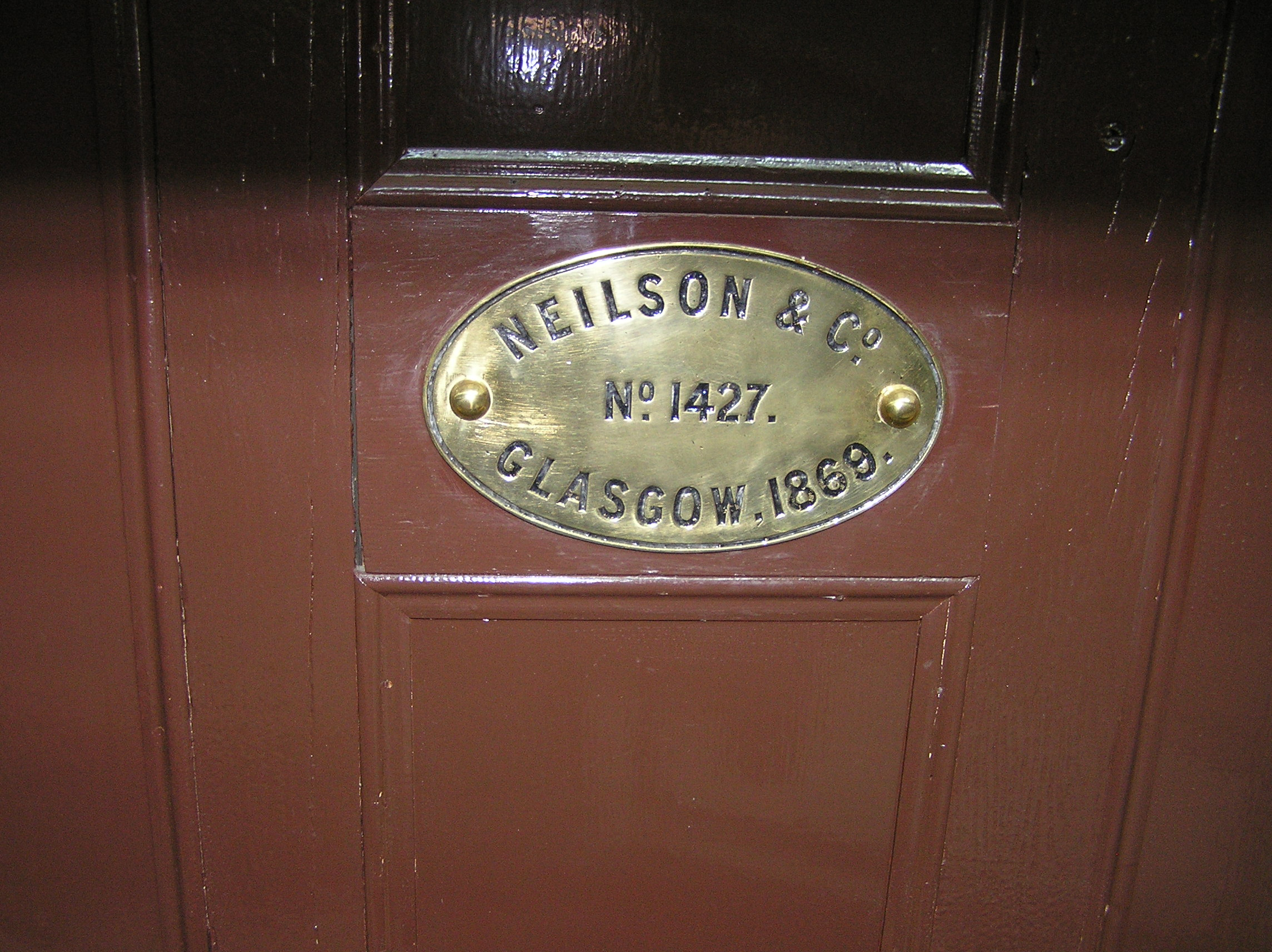
Neilson & Co works plate, on No.21 at the Finnish Railway Museum.

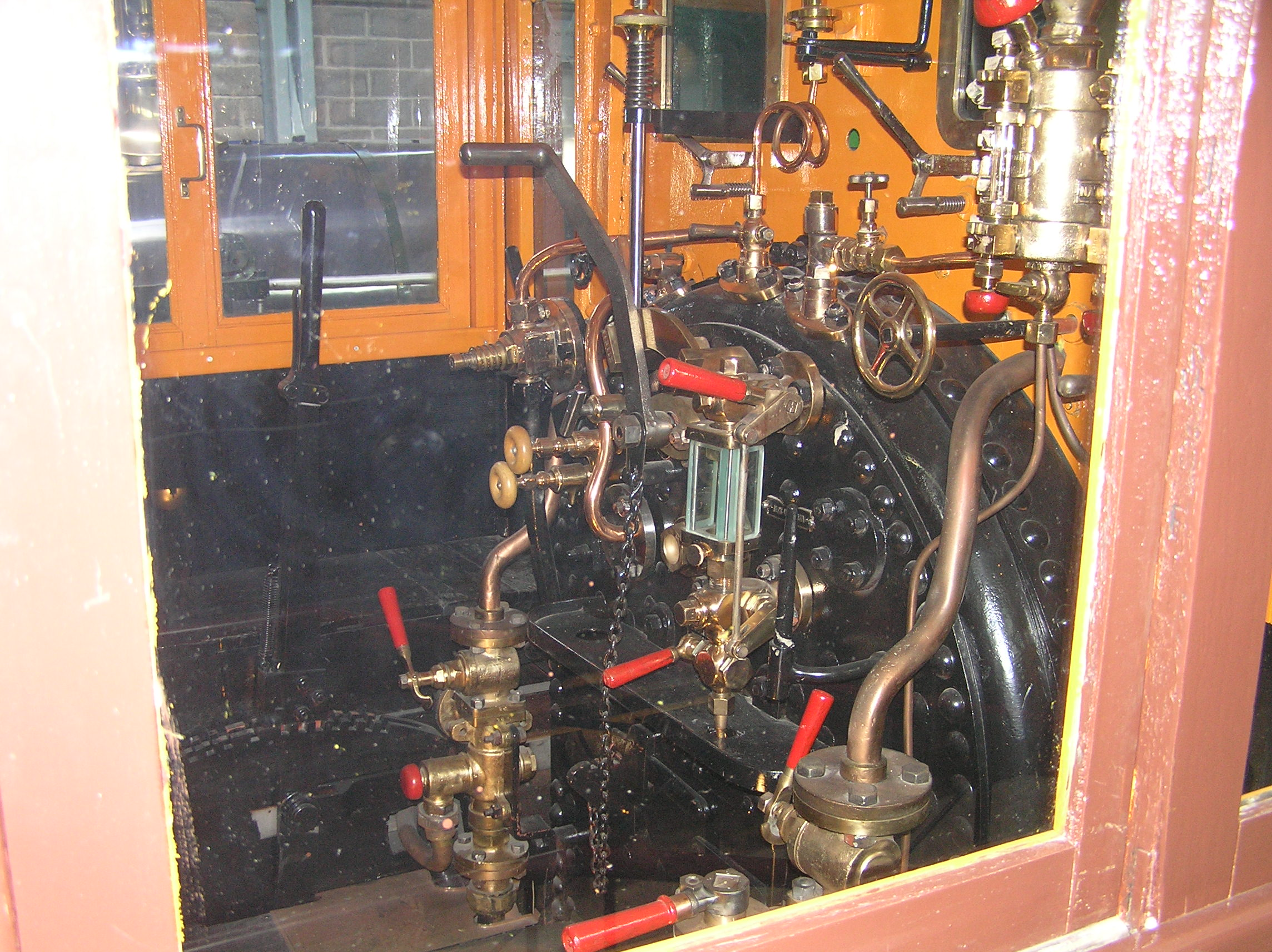
The Cab interior of No.21 at the Finnish Railway Museum.
