= Finnish Steam Locomotive Class C5 =

Class of Finnish steam locomotives

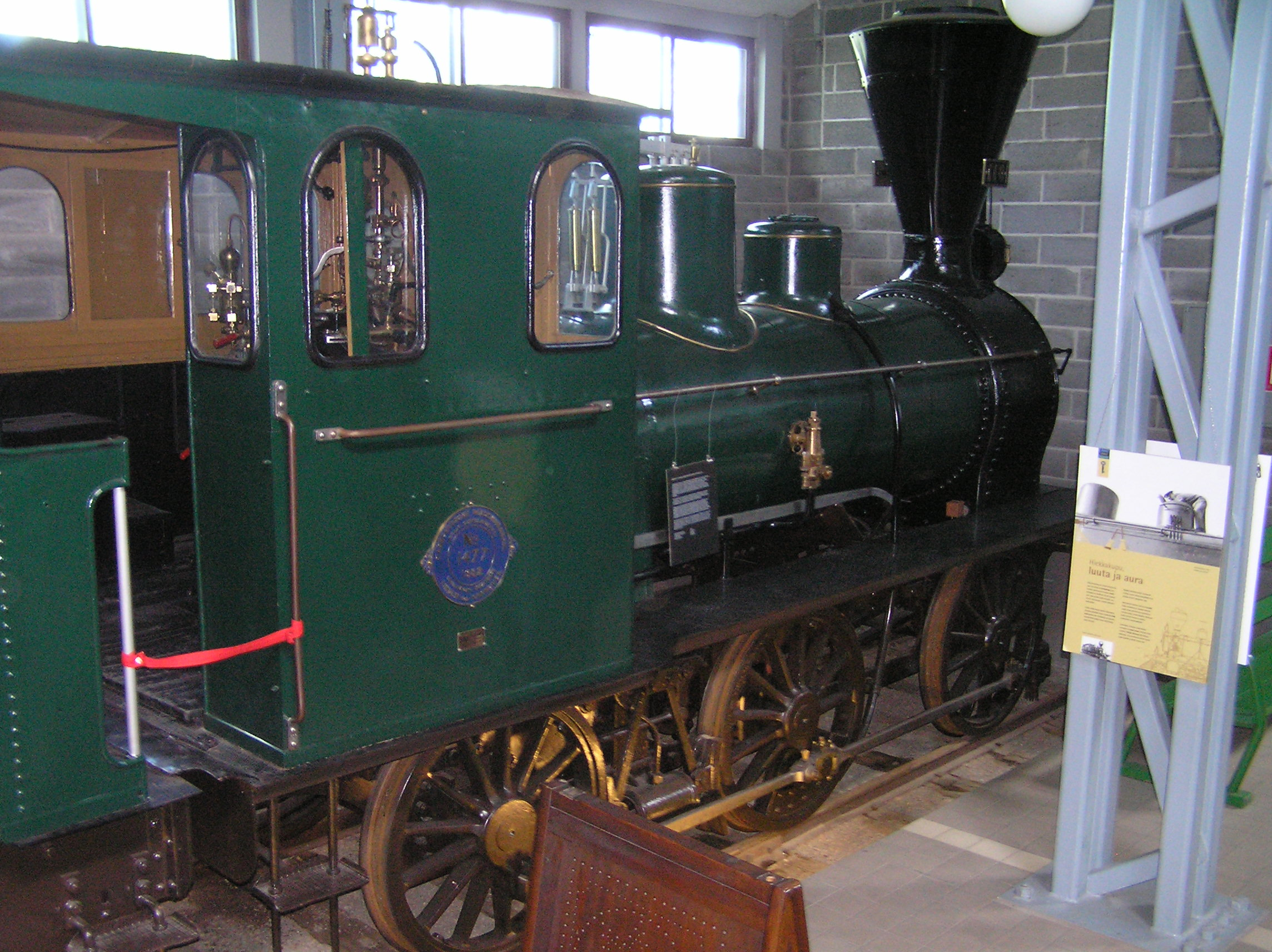
- Hannoversche Maschinenbau locomotive No 1477 of 1882 0-6-0 at the Finnish Railway Museum
Type and origin
- Power type: Steam
- Builder: Hanomag
- Serial number: 101–114
- Build date: 1881–1882
- Total produced: 14
Specifications
- Configuration
  - Whyte: 0-6-0
- Gauge: 1,524 mm (5 ft)
- Length: 11.7 m (38 ft)
- Loco weight: 33 t (32 long tons; 36 short tons)
- Fuel capacity: Coal: 4.5 m^{3} (160 cu ft) ; Wood: 4.6 m^{3} (160 cu ft)
- Water cap.: 4.4 m^{3} (160 cu ft)
- Firebox
  - Grate area: 1.02 m^{2} (11.0 sq ft)
- Heating surface: 55.9 m^{2} (602 sq ft)
Performance figures
- Maximum speed: 60 km/h (37 mph)
Career
- Nicknames: “Bliksti”
- First run: 1882
- Withdrawn: 1930
- Disposition: One preserved (No. 110), at the Finnish Railway Museum

The Finnish Steam Locomotive Class C5 were ordered in 1880 by the Finnish State Railways from the German Hanomag factory for the Tampere–Vaasa railway line. The locomotives were completed between 1881–1882 and received the Class designation C5. The C5 locomotives had inside cylinders, as in other C-series locomotives. Originally it was planned that the locomotives be used for both freight and passenger duties. But passenger locomotives were considered unnecessary, because at that time the maximum speed of trains on the Tampere and Vaasa railway line was only 26.7 kilometres per hour (16.6 mph). C5 locomotives soon proved to be insufficiently powerful for the gradients of the Tampere and Vaasa railway line. C5 locomotives were moved to the flatter Seinäjoki–Oulu line, where they performed satisfactorily.

By the 1900s the C5 locomotives were transferred to shunting duties in the marshalling yards of various towns and cities around Finland. They were agile and therefore suitable for shunting duties. Because of the agility of the C5 locomotive it was nicknamed "Bliksti" or a “glimpse”. Today the Finnish Railway Museum has a class C5 on display.

== Gallery ==
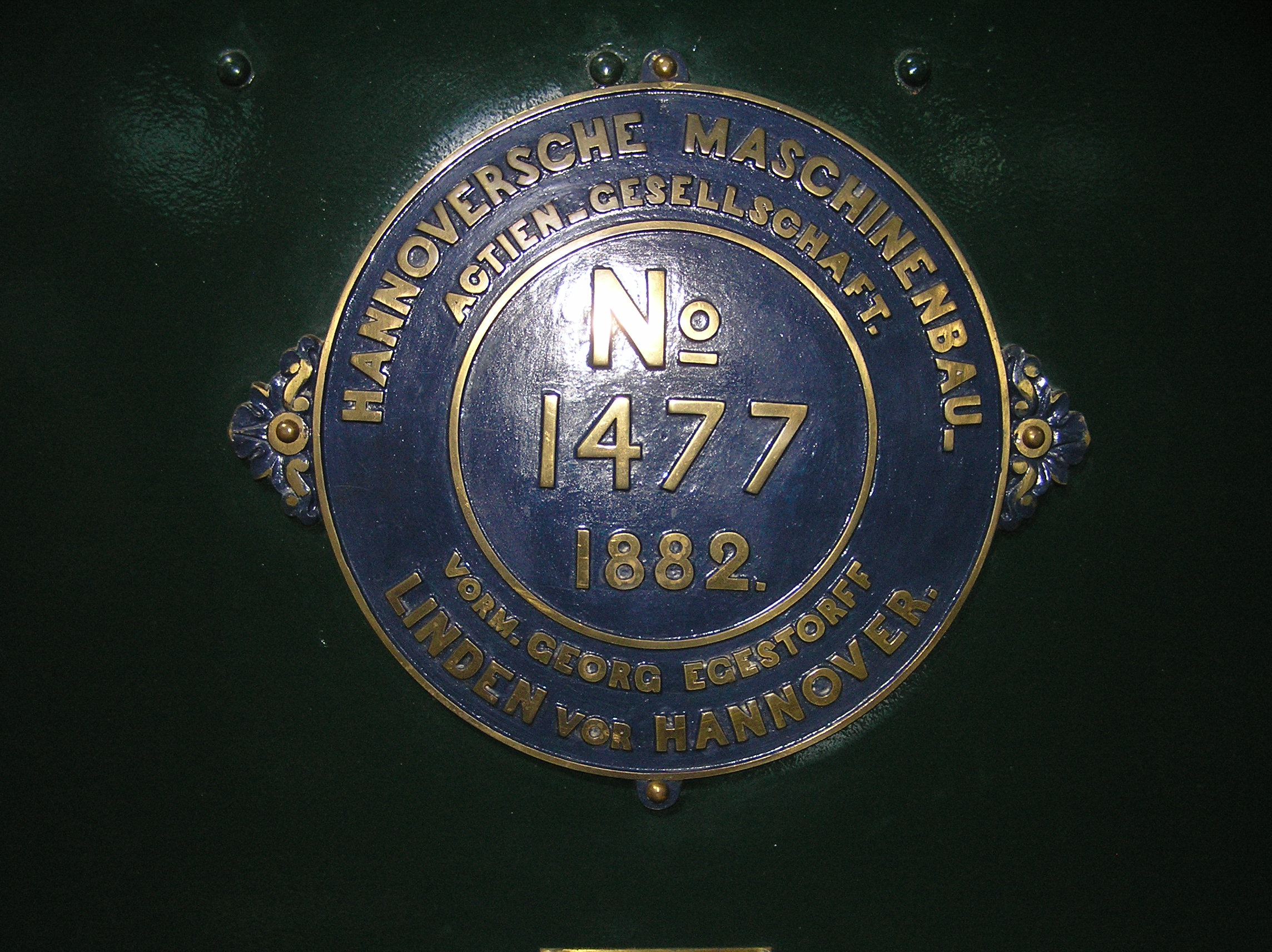
Builder's Plate of Hannoversche Maschinenbau locomotive No 1477 of 1882 0-6-0 at the Finnish Railway Museum
