= VR Class Sk1 =

Class of Finnish steam locomotives

VR Class Sk1 Finnish Steam Locomotive Classes G1, G2 & G4
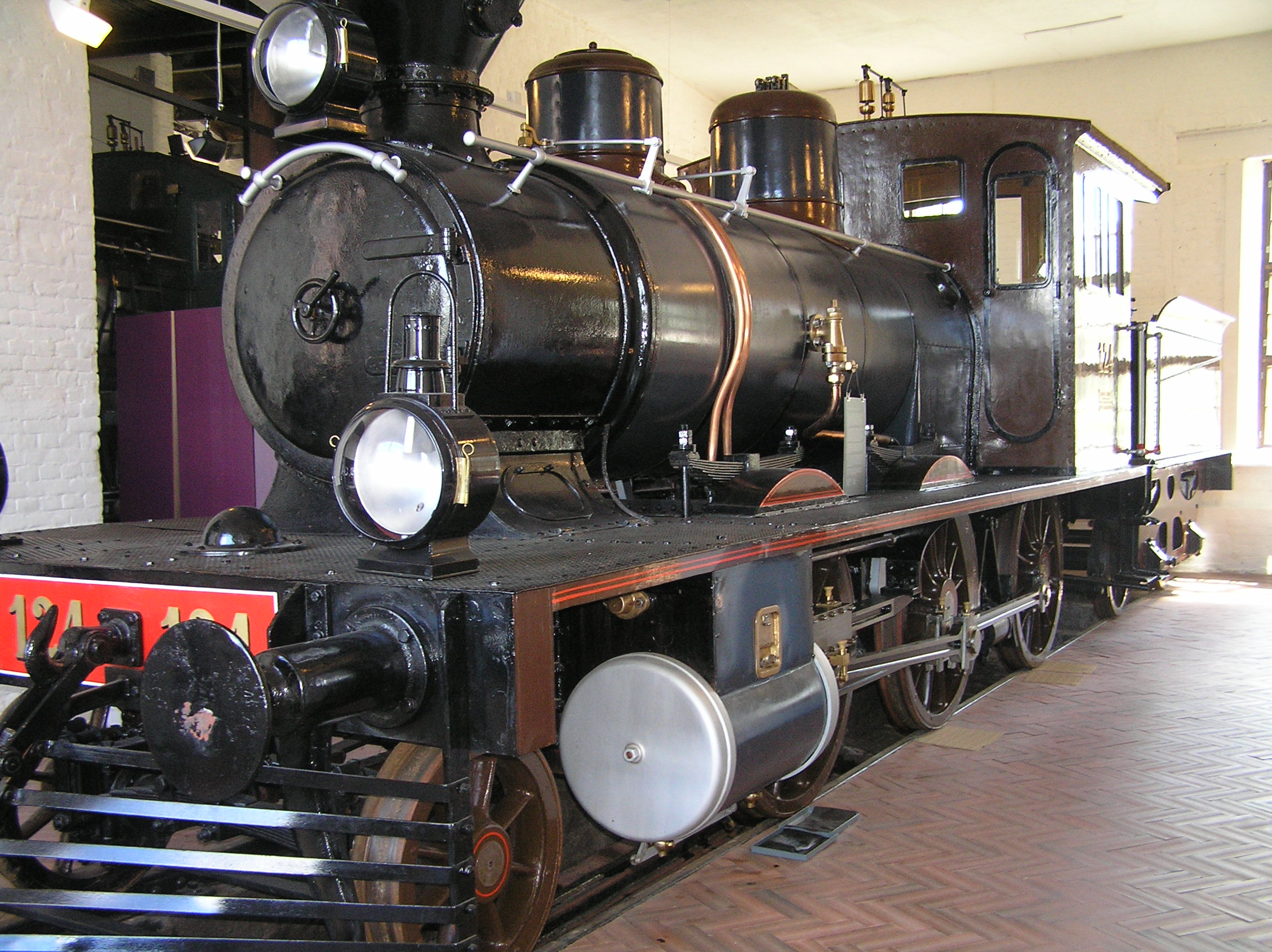
- Class Sk1 No 124 at the Finnish Railway Museum
Type and origin
- Power type: Steam
- Builder: Swiss Locomotive & Machine Works
- Serial number: 117–131, 134–149, 152–172, 183–190
- Build date: 1885
- Total produced: 60
Specifications
- Configuration
  - Whyte: 2-6-0
- Gauge: 1,524 mm (5 ft)
- Length: 12.8 m (42 feet 0 inches)
- Loco weight: 42.5 t (41.8 long tons; 46.8 short tons)
- Fuel type: Coal or wood
- Fuel capacity: Coal: 4.5 m^{3} (158.9 cu ft); Wood: 5 m^{3} (176.6 cu ft)
- Water cap.: 4.6 m^{3} (162.4 cu ft)
- Firebox
  - Grate area: 1.11 m^{2} (11.95 sq ft)
- Heating surface: 68.3 m^{2} (735.2 sq ft)
Performance figures
- Maximum speed: 60 km/h (37 mph)
Career
- Nicknames: Little Brown
- First run: 1885
- Disposition: One preserved (No. 124), at the Finnish Railway Museum, and one preserved in (No. 135) at Hyvinkää.

The VR Class Sk1, originally known as the Finnish Steam Locomotive Classes G1, G2 & G4, were a series of 60 2-6-0 locomotives built for the Finnish State Railways by Swiss Locomotive & Machine Works in 1885. Two are preserved, one at (No. 124), at the Finnish Railway Museum, and the other (No. 135) at Hyvinkää.

== Gallery ==
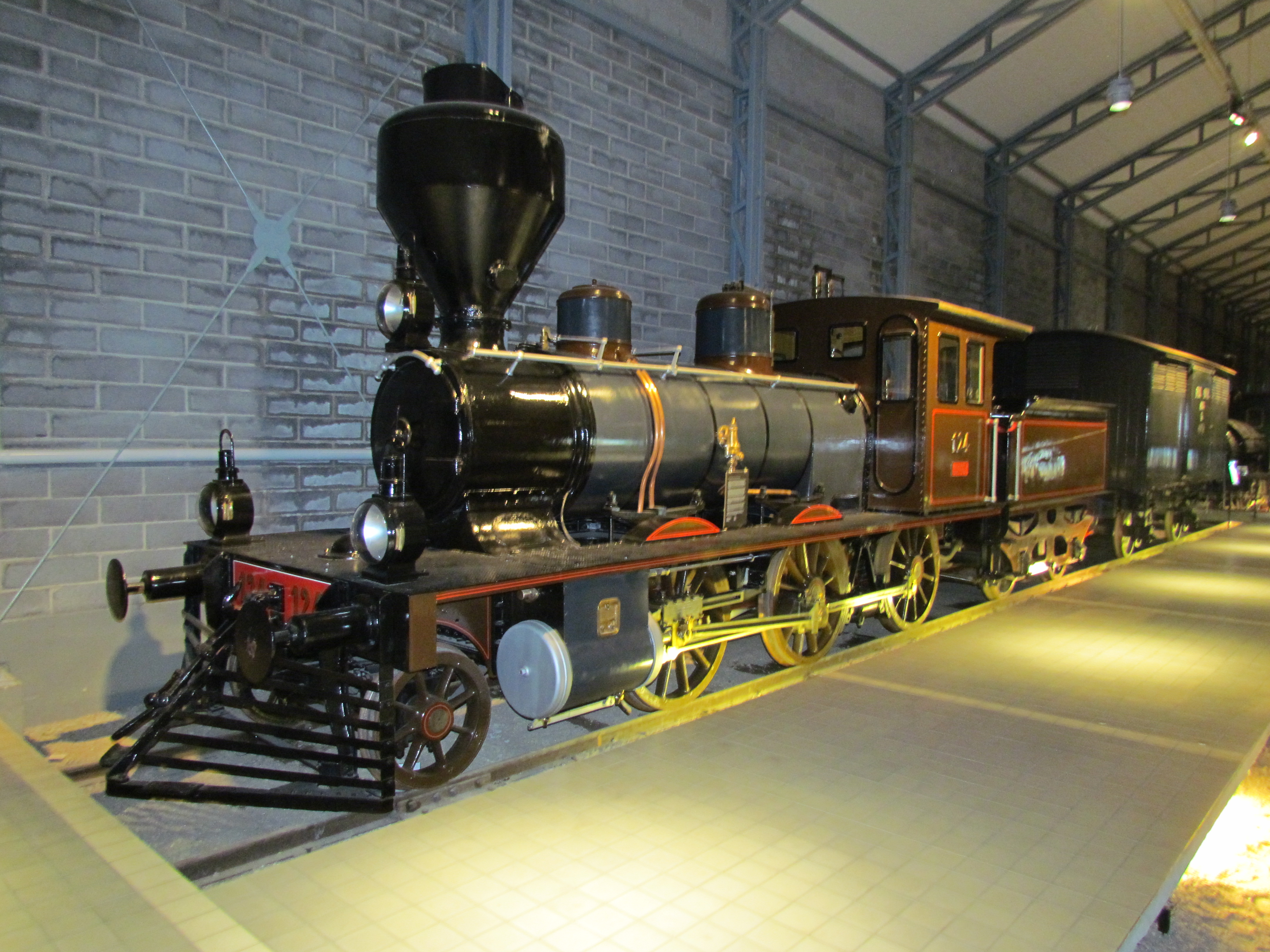
VR Class Sk1 124 at the Finnish Railway Museum in 2017

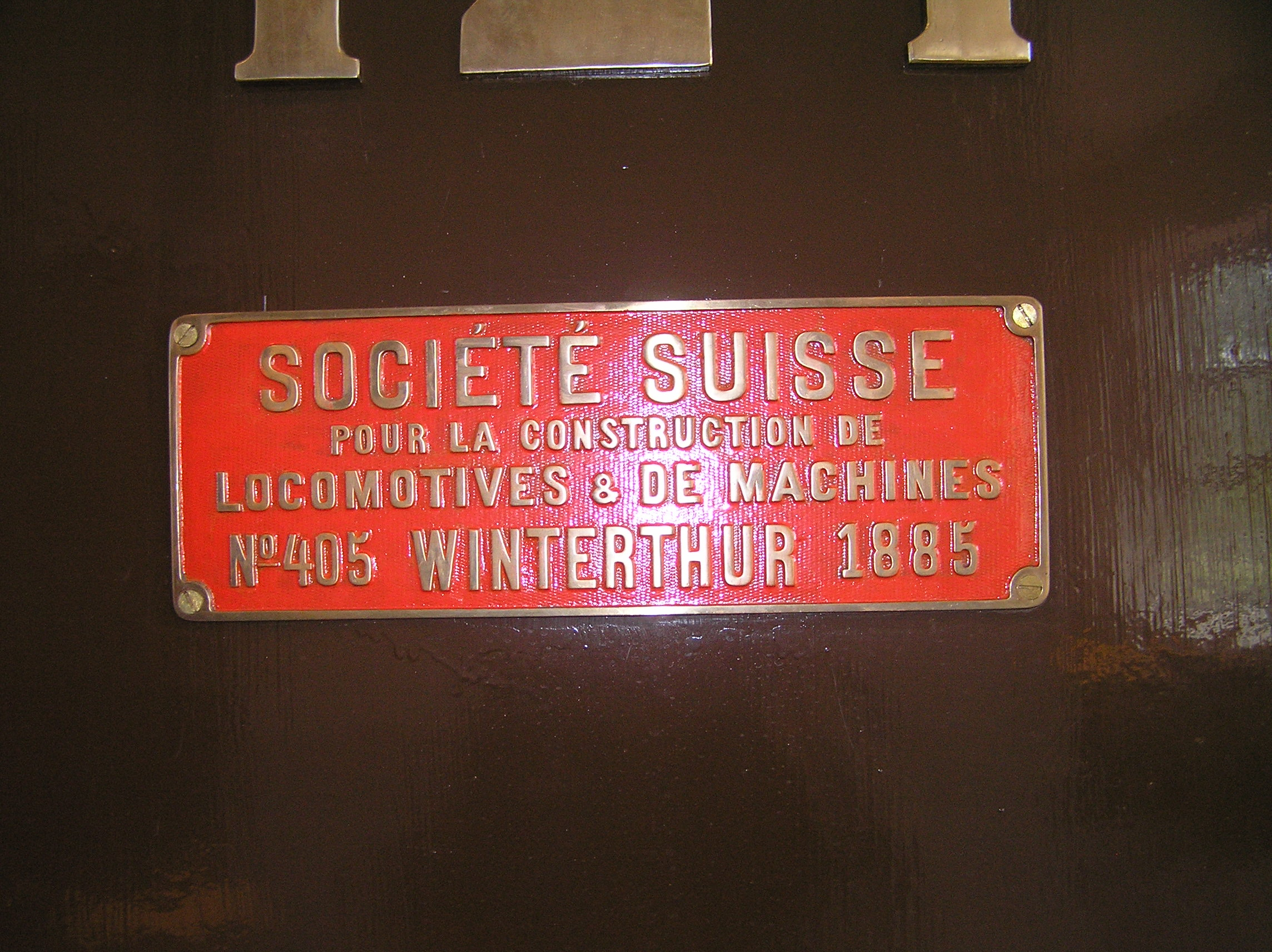
Builder's plate (in French) of Societe Suisse locomotive No 405 of 1884 2-6-0 at the Finnish Railway Museum

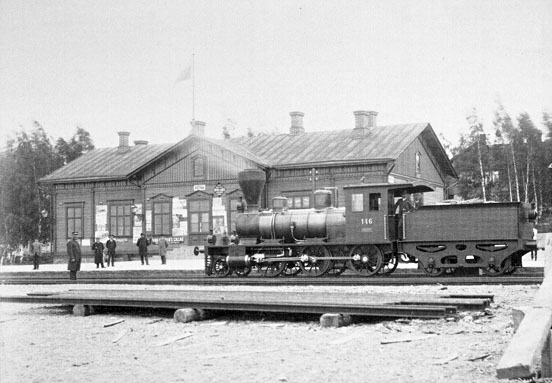
VR Class Sk1 146 at Kotka railway station
