= VR Class Vk3 =

Class of Finnish steam locomotives

VR Class Vk3 Finnish Steam Locomotive Class I3
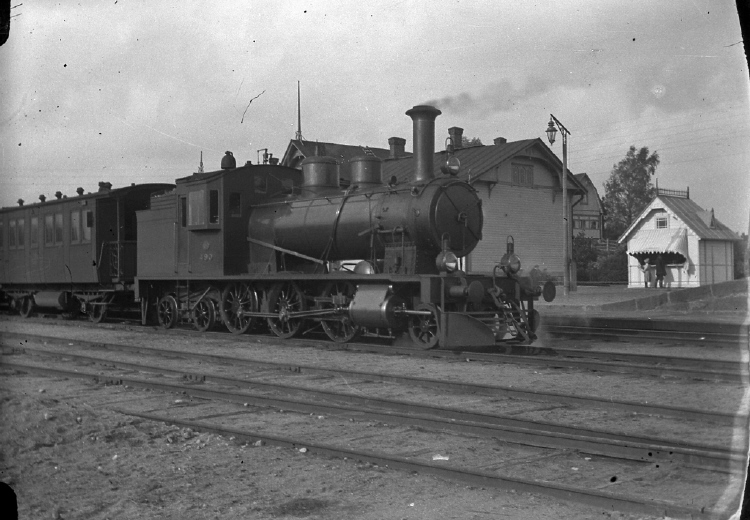
- Class Vk3 steam locomotive (no. 490) at Kauklahti railway station in Espoo in the 1920s.
Type and origin
- Power type: Steam
- Builder: Tampella Tampereen Pellava- ja Rautateollisuus Oy
- Serial number: 456, 487–492
- Build date: 1906–1909
- Total produced: 7
Specifications
- Configuration
  - Whyte: 2-6-4T
- Gauge: 1,524 mm (5 ft)
- Length: 11.33 m (37 ft 2 in)
- Loco weight: 53.5 t (52.7 long tons; 59.0 short tons)
- Fuel type: coal or wood
- Fuel capacity: Coal: 2.3 m^{3} (81.2 cu ft); Wood: 4.5 m^{3} (158.9 cu ft)
- Water cap.: 5.5 m^{3} (194.2 cu ft)
- Firebox
  - Grate area: 1.54 m^{2} (16.58 sq ft)
- Feedwater heater: 15.5 m^{2} (166.8 sq ft)
- Heating surface: 82.2 m^{2} (884.8 sq ft)
Performance figures
- Maximum speed: 64 km/h (40 mph)
Career
- Nicknames: "Iita"
- First run: 1906
- Withdrawn: 1964
- Disposition: One preserved (No. 489), at the Finnish Railway Museum
- information from and

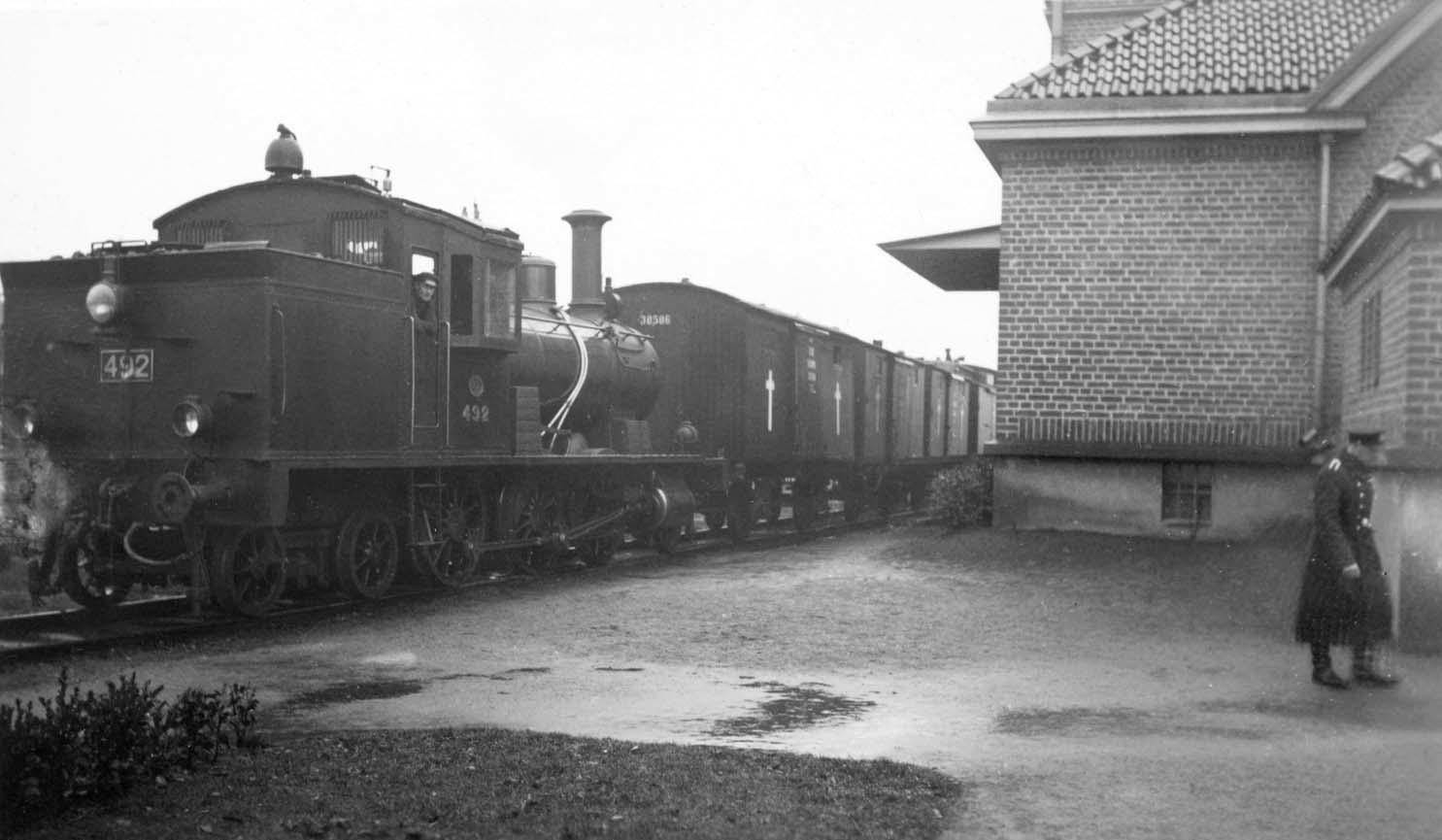
Vk3 492 on a funeral train from Harju Morgue, Helsinki, Finland to Malmi cemetery in 1931

The VR Class Vk3 was originally called the Finnish Steam Locomotive Class I3. The Finnish State Railways ordered three similar classes of locomotives; The American-built Baldwin Class I1s, and the Class I2s and Class I3s, built at Tampella. All were tank locomotives, which did not have to be turned at terminal stations and could run in both directions at the same speed.

All the Class I locomotives were used for local transport until the mid-1920s. After the mid-1920s the more efficient Class N1 locomotives entered service and the Class I locomotives were transferred to the shunting duties.

Locomotive No. 456 was the first state railway locomotive to be fitted with a superheater; the results were successful and from then on, almost all the Finnish State Railways steam locomotives were fitted with superheaters.

Locomotive No. 489 was built in 1909, was equipped with a superheater, and was initially used for local traffic around Helsinki. It served for 55 years before being withdrawn from shunting duties in 1964. It is now preserved at the Finnish Railway Museum.
