= VR Class Sk3 =

Class of Finnish steam locomotives

VR Class Sk3 Finnish Steam Locomotive Classes G3, G5, G10 & G11
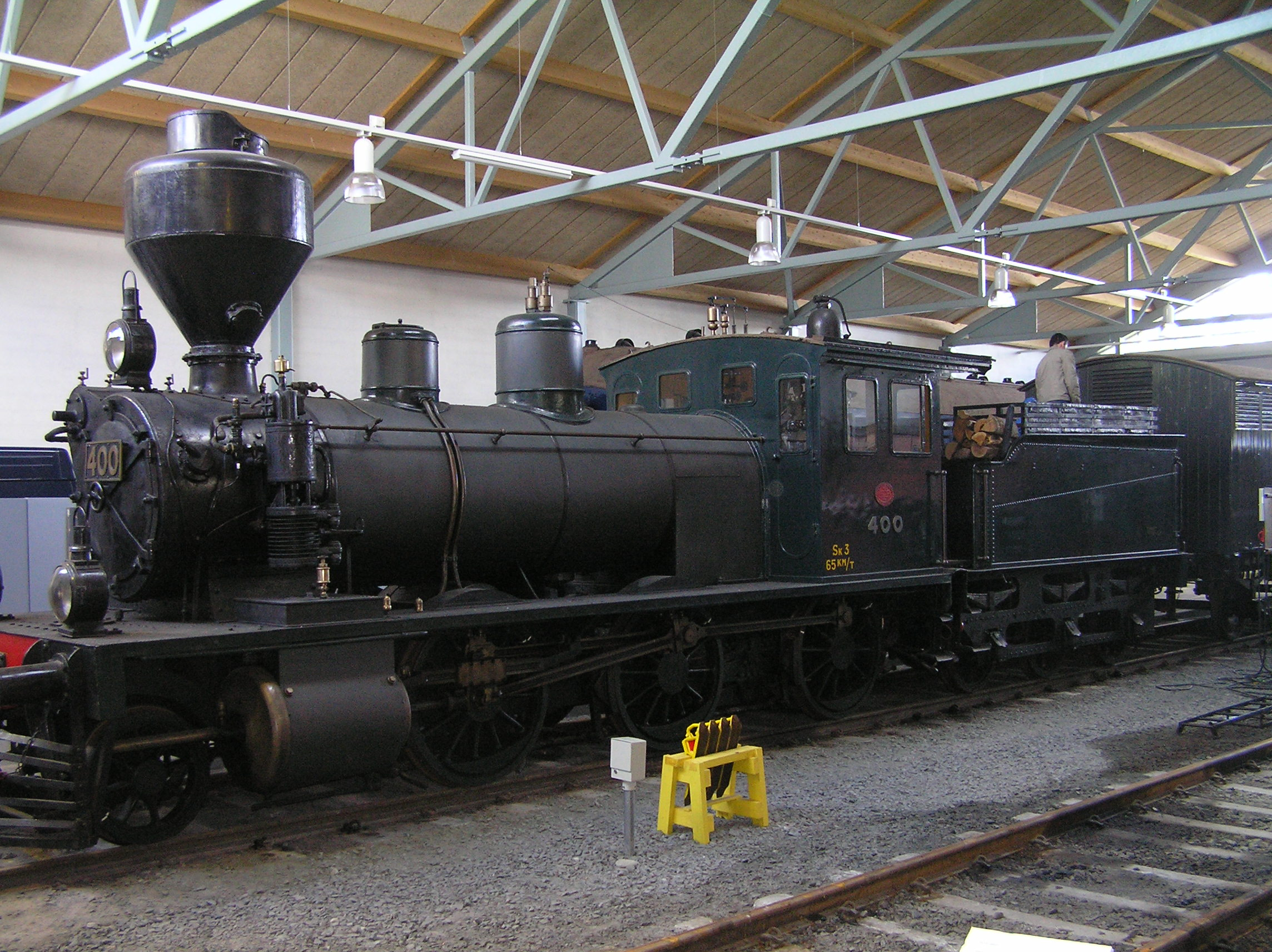
- Class Sk3 No 400 at the Finnish Railway Museum
Type and origin
- Power type: Steam
- Builder: Tampella
- Serial number: 173–177, 191–195, 214–221, 334–359, 373–406, 427–436
- Build date: 1892–1903
- Total produced: 88
Specifications
- Configuration
  - Whyte: 2-6-0
  - UIC: 1′C
- Gauge: 1,524 mm (5 ft)
- Length: 14.07 m (46 ft 2 in)
- Loco weight: 34.5 t (34.0 long tons; 38.0 short tons) (G3); 33.5 t (33.0 long tons; 36.9 short tons) (G5); 35.3 t (34.7 long tons; 38.9 short tons) (G10 and G11)
- Fuel type: Coal or wood
- Fuel capacity: Coal: 5.5 m^{3} (194.2 cu ft); Wood: 3.7 m^{3} (130.7 cu ft)
- Water cap.: 7.9 m^{3} (279.0 cu ft)
- Firebox
  - Grate area: 1.38 m^{2} (14.85 sq ft)
- Heating surface: 87.2 m^{2} (938.6 sq ft)
Performance figures
- Maximum speed: 60 km/h (37 mph)
Career
- Nicknames: "Mummo" ("Grandmother")
- Disposition: One preserved (No. 400), at the Finnish Railway Museum

The VR Class Sk3, originally known as the Finnish Steam Locomotive Classes G3, G5, G10 & G11, was a class of 88 2-6-0 steam locomotives, built for the Finnish State Railways from 1892 to 1903 at Tampella. One is preserved (No. 400), at the Finnish Railway Museum

== Gallery ==
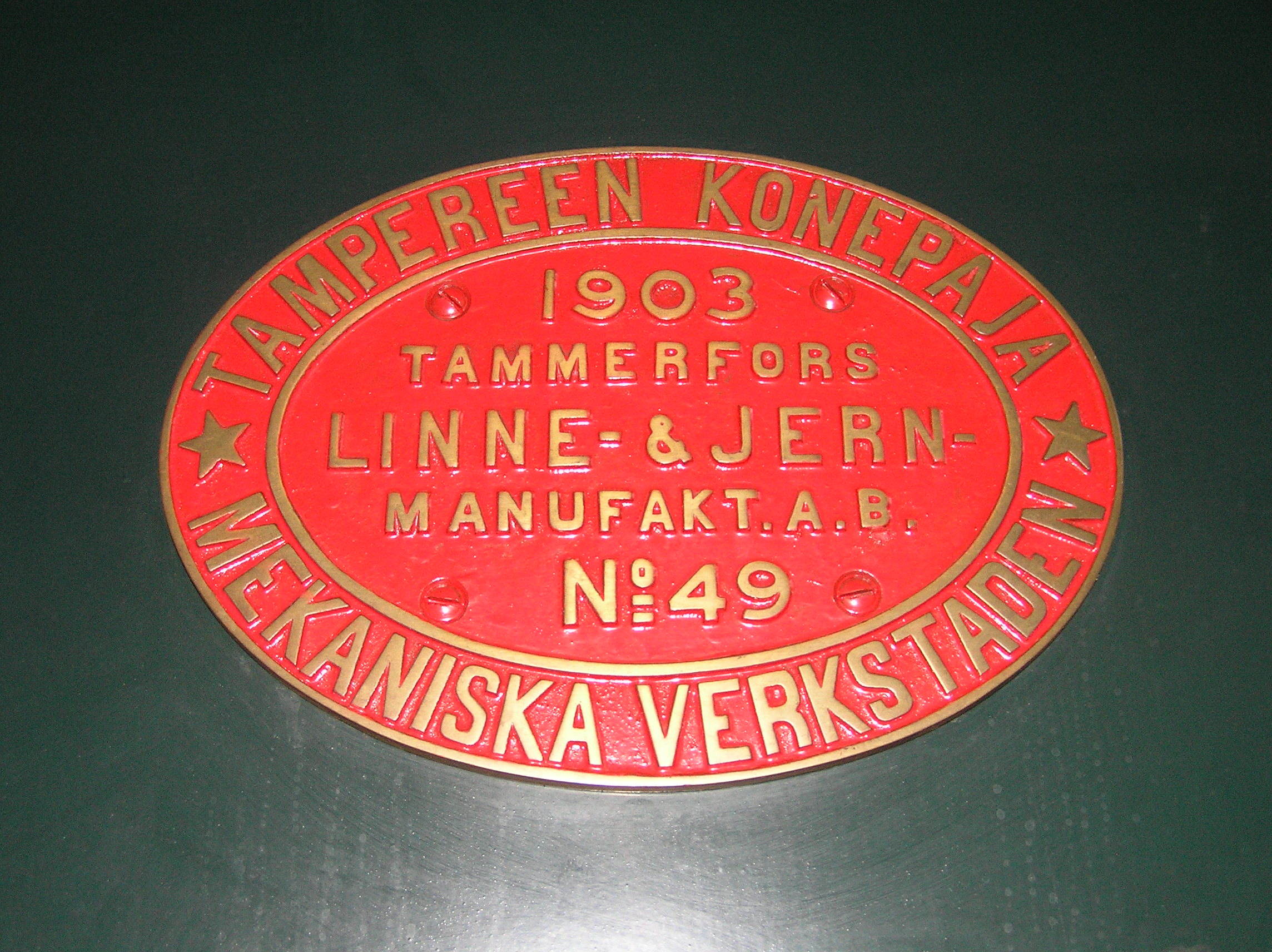
The builder’s plate of Sk3 400 of 1903 at the Finnish Railway Museum

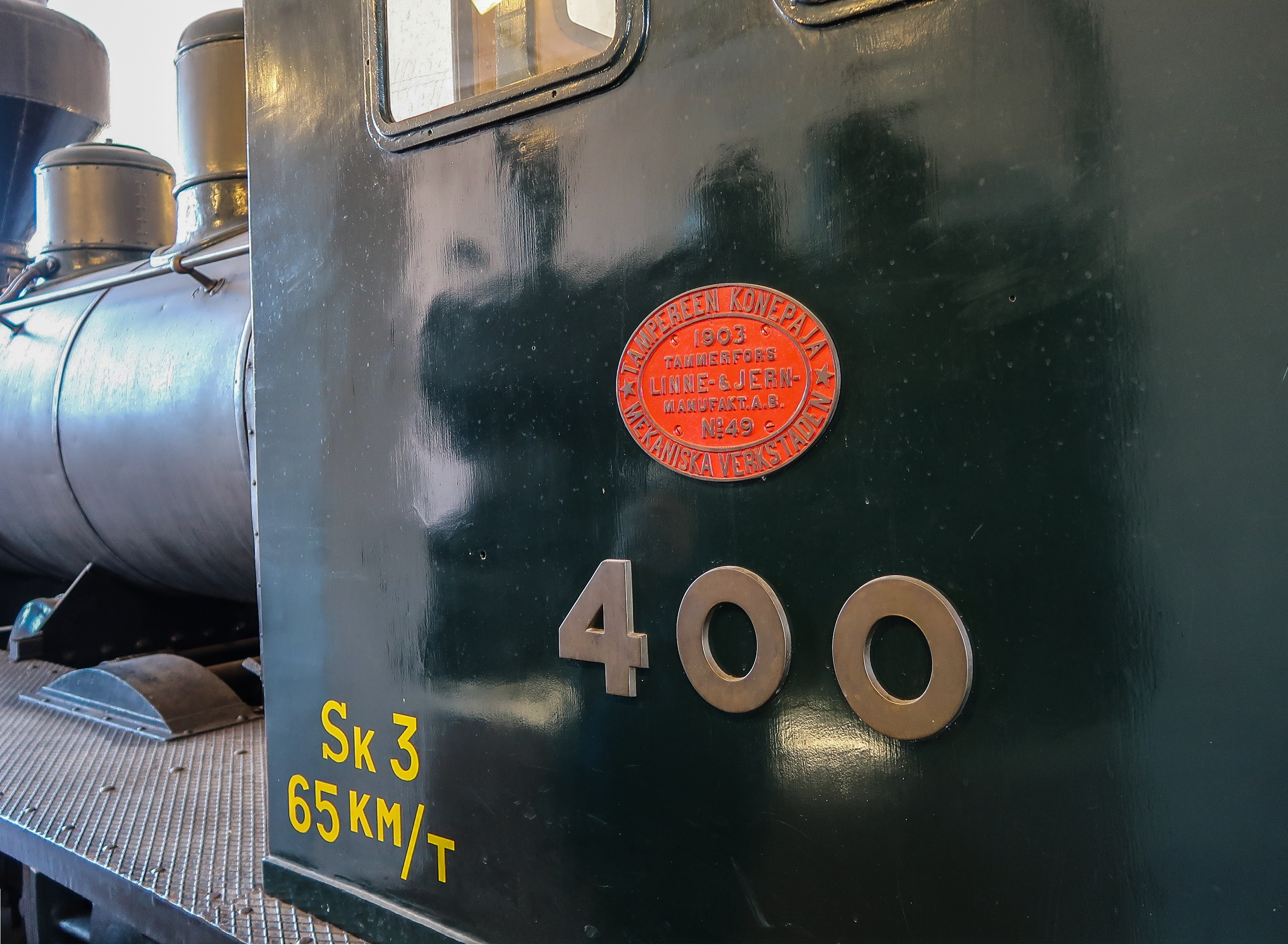
The builder’s plate and cab side of Sk3 400 at the Finnish Railway Museum

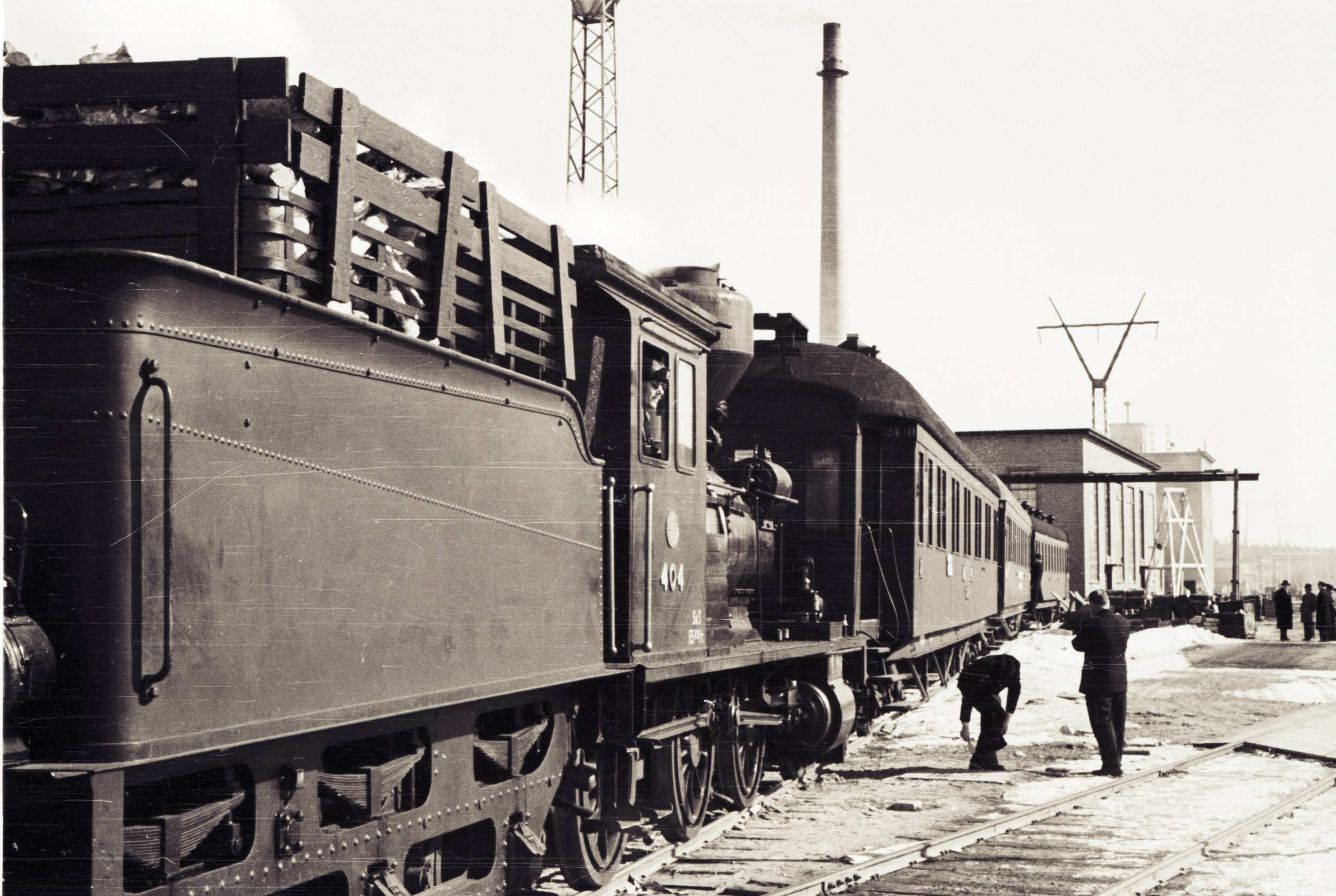
Sk3 404 at Pasila in 1955
