= Conservation and restoration of rail vehicles =

Aims to preserve historic rail vehicles

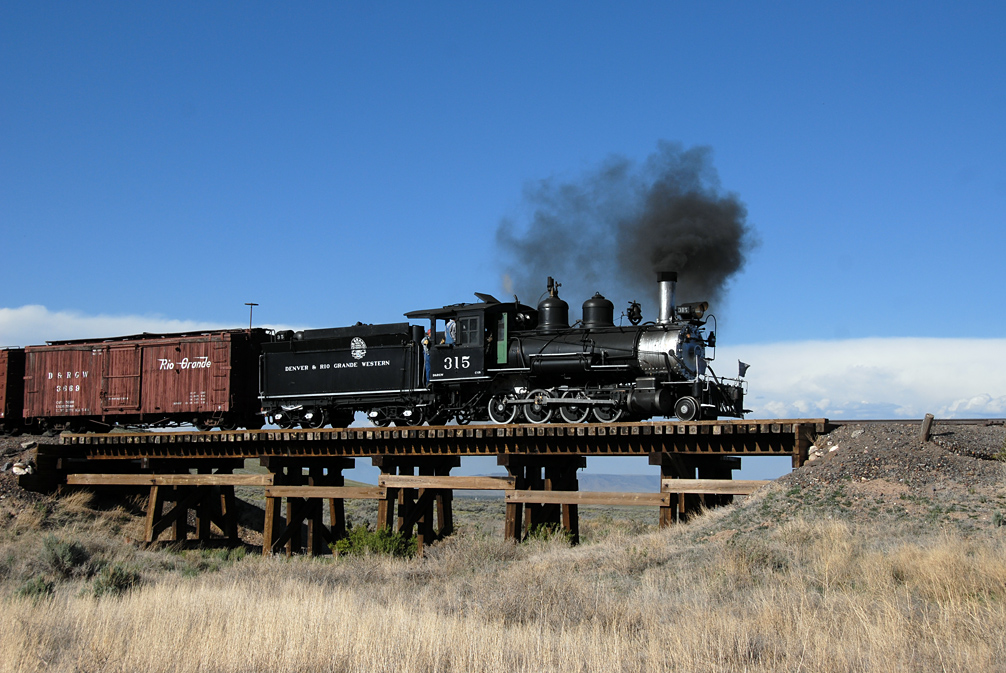
Denver & Rio Grande Western 315

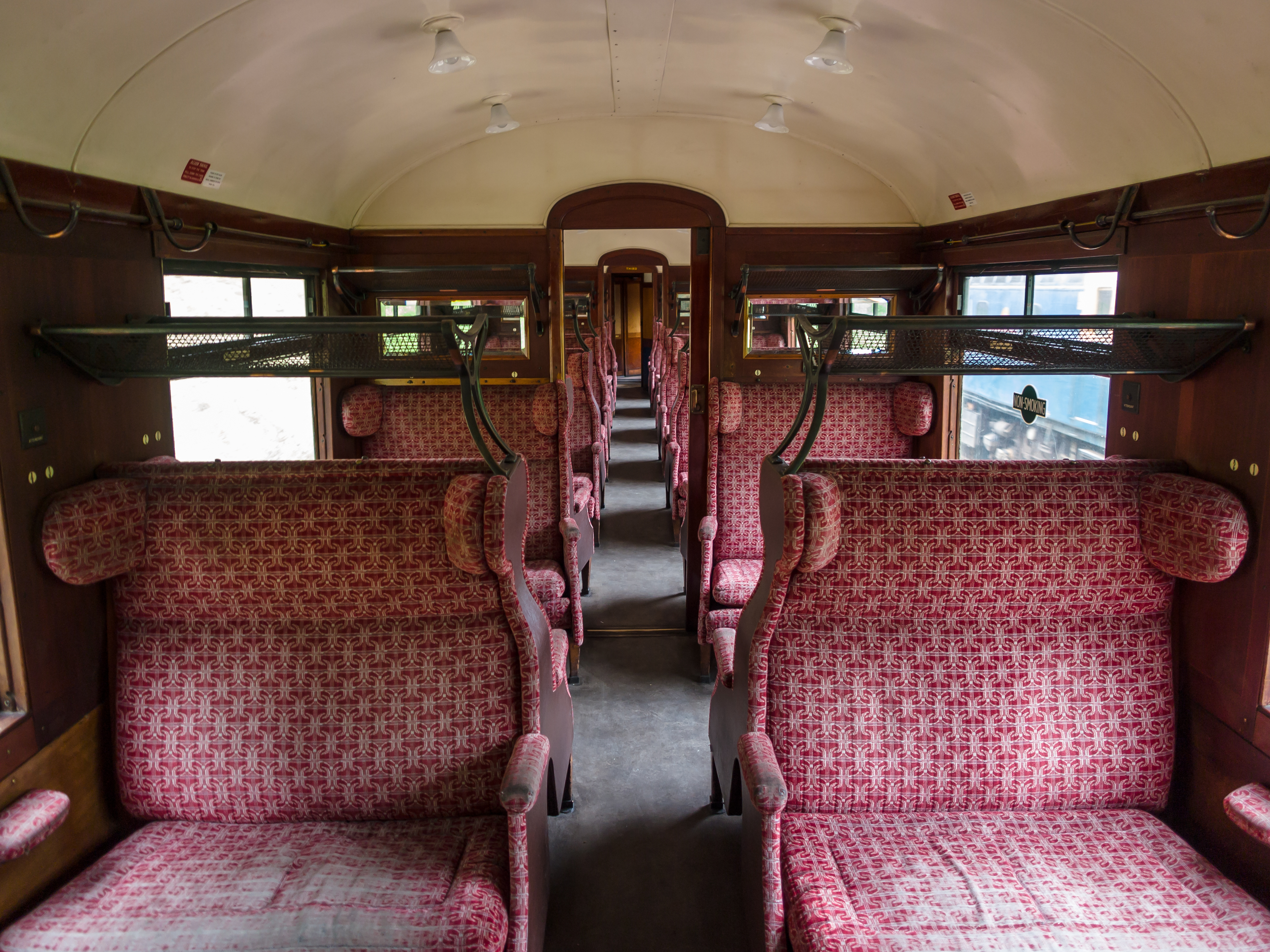
Interior coach

Conservation and restoration of rail vehicles aims to preserve historic rail vehicles. It may concern trains that have been removed from service and later restored to their past condition, or have never been removed from service, like UP 844, the only U.S. steam locomotive to never be retired. They are often operated in present-day service as moving examples of living history, as opposed to static exhibits.

The majority of restored trains are operated at heritage railways and railway museums, although they can also be found on the main lines or branch lines of the commercial working railway, operated by specialist railtour companies or museum groups. In contrast, main line railway preservation is the practice of operating restored trains on a railway network which is also operational primarily for serious commercial use.

For authenticity, the location/route of preserved trains is often chosen to match the original trains used. Heritage railways and railway museums aim to restore and operate restored trains. Trains are often restored to the original authentic livery of their original owner.

== In the United States ==
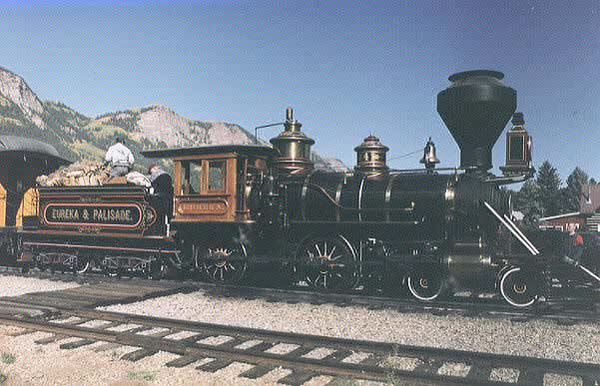
Eureka & Palisades No. 4, an example of a restored train in the United States

The restoration of historic railway equipment has gained importance in the United States, primarily because of a large amount of steam locomotives and cabooses donated by railroads to cities and museums, many of which have been displayed in parks for many years. Often these restoration projects are accomplished by a local railroad club or chapters of a national organization.

Examples of major projects accomplished by clubs are D&RGW 315, which was displayed in the city park in Durango, Colorado, until removed by the Durango Railway Historical Society and restored to operation, as well as D&RGW 223, which was displayed at Liberty Park in Salt Lake City, Utah, until moved to Ogden and restored by the Golden Spike Chapter of the Railway & Locomotive Historical Society.

Eureka & Palisades 4, also known as the Eureka, was purchased by a lawyer from Reno, Nevada. It was restored and is still privately owned, operating occasionally on the Durango & Silverton and Cumbres & Toltec Scenic Railroads in Colorado.

== Streetcars ==
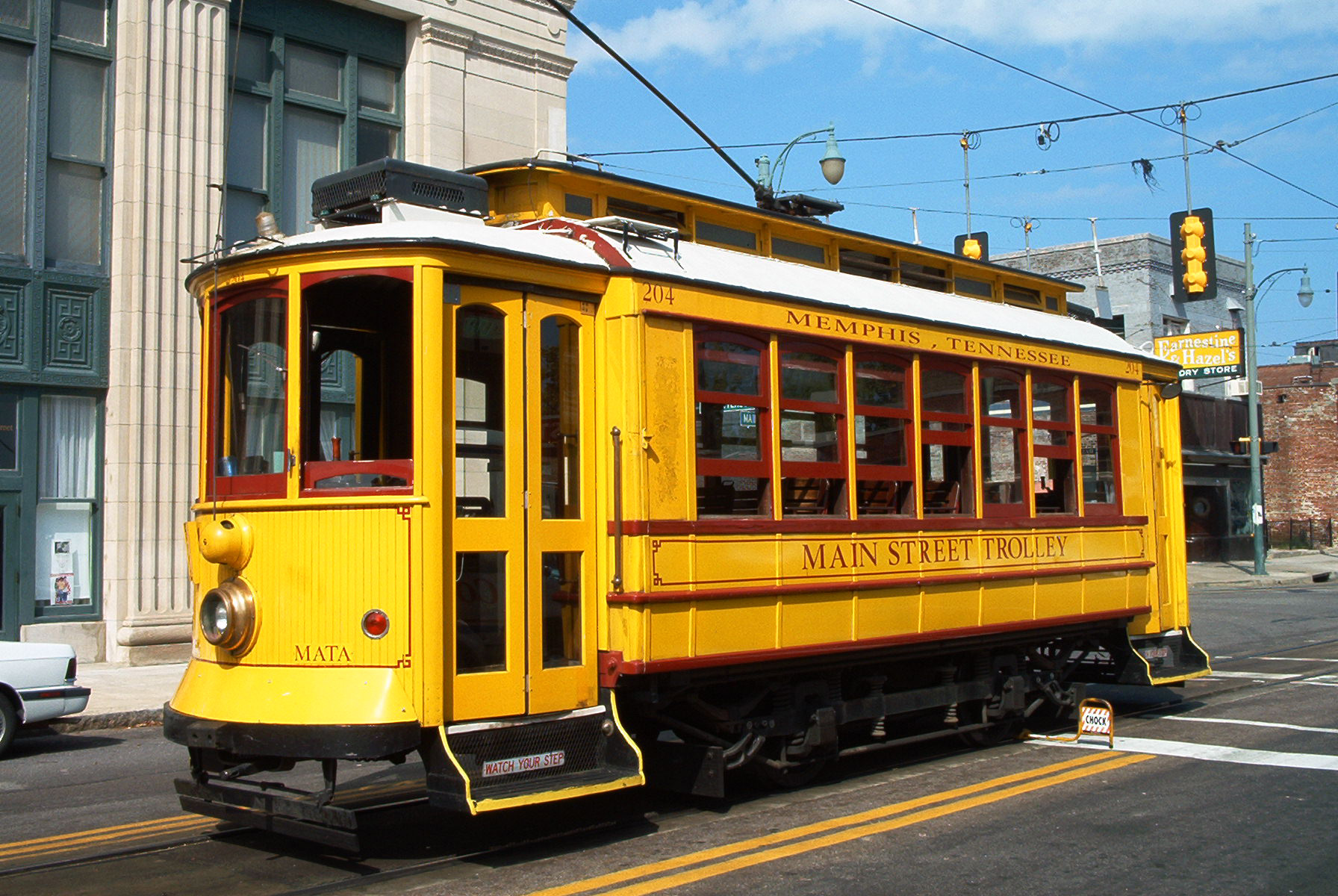
A former Porto trolley in Memphis, Tennessee, United States

Heritage streetcars or heritage trams are a part of the efforts to preserve rail transit heritage. In addition to preserving street-running rail vehicles, heritage streetcar operations can include upkeep of historic rail infrastructure. Working heritage streetcars are closely related to the growing global heritage railway movement and form a part of the living history of rail transport.

The vehicles are called streetcars or trolleys in North America and trams or tramcars elsewhere. The first two terms are often used interchangeably in the United States, with trolley being preferred in the eastern US and streetcar in Canada and the western US. In parts of the United States, internally powered buses made to resemble a streetcar are often referred to as "trolleys". To avoid further confusion with trolley buses, the American Public Transportation Association (APTA) refers to them as "trolley-replica buses".

Museums, heritage tram line operators, and amateur enthusiasts can preserve original vintage vehicles or create replicas of historic vehicles to re-create or preserve streetcar technology of the past. Heritage vehicles that are kept fully functional can be used on heritage tramlines or for charter traffic.

== Bibliography ==
- Carlson et al. (1986), The Colorful Streetcars We Rode, Bulletin 125 of the Central Electric Railfans' Association, Chicago, Il. ISBN 0-915348-25-X
- Taplin, Michael; and Russell, Michael (2002). Trams in Western Europe (ISBN 1-85414-265-8). Harrow Weald, Middlesex, UK: Capital Transport Publishing.

== See also ==
- Cable car (railway)
- Gandy dancer
- Horsecar
- List of heritage railways
- List of town tramway systems
- Heritage railways in Britain
- Motive power depot
- Railway workshop
- San Francisco Historic Trolley Festival
