= VR Class Pr2 =

Class of Finnish steam locomotives

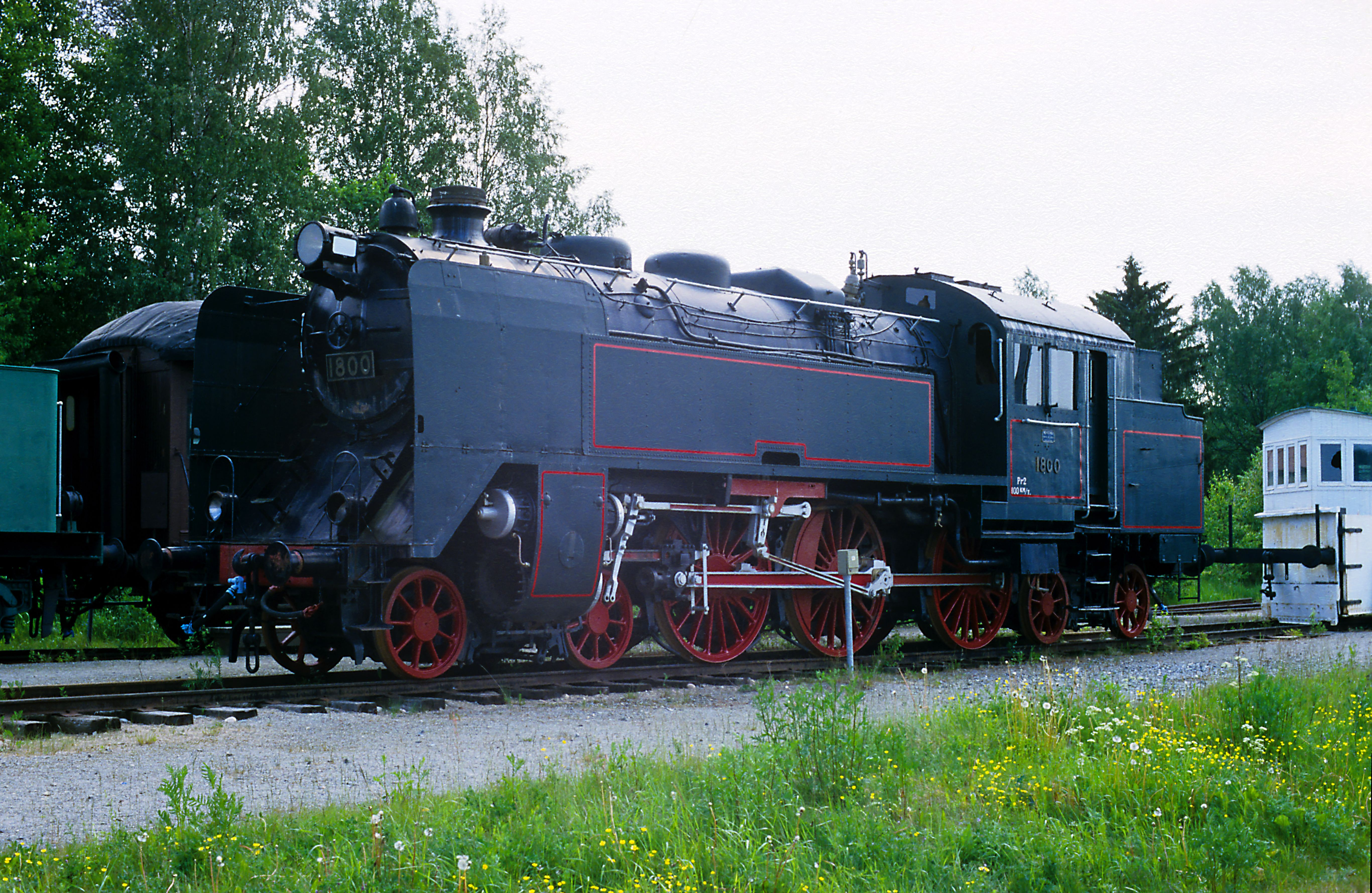
- VR Class Pr2 steam locomotive
Type and origin
- Power type: Steam
- Builder: Henschel & Son
- Build date: 1939–41
- Total produced: 4
Specifications
- Configuration
  - Whyte: 4-6-4T
- Gauge: 1,524 mm (5 ft)
- Length: 16.24 m (53 ft 3 3/8 in)
- Loco weight: 114 tonnes (112 long tons; 126 short tons)
- Fuel type: Coal or firewood
- Fuel capacity: Coal 6 t (5.9 long tons; 6.6 short tons); Firewood 8 m^{3} (280 cu ft)
- Water cap.: 14 m^{3} (490 cu ft)
- Firebox
  - Grate area: 1,715 m^{2} (18,460 sq ft)
- Heating surface
  - Firebox: 35 m^{2} (380 sq ft)
Performance figures
- Maximum speed: 100 km/h (62 mph)
Career
- Numbers: 1800–1803
- Nicknames: "Henskeli"
- Withdrawn: May 1960
- Disposition: 1800 Haapamäki

The Finnish VR Class Pr2, nicknamed "Henschel", was a passenger tank class ordered from the Henschel & Son locomotive workshops by the Estonia State Railways in the spring 1939 and completed in 1941. The outbreak of the Second World War prevented their delivery to Estonia, but at least a few of these engines did manage to operate in Latvia in 1942. These engines became superfluous, because the Germans were converting the Baltic tracks to standard gauge, and so Finland could purchase these four engines. They were classified Pr2 and numbered 1800–1803 after their arrival in December 1942.

The Pr2 tank engines were quite advanced locomotives, based on the Henschel Class 62 tank engine design of 1928. After their initial problems were solved, they proved to be fast runners and an ideal addition to the motive power roster. They were originally built by as oil-burners, and reverted to this type of fuel between 1947 and 1954 when oil prices were low. The Pr2 was very fast with its 1,830 mm wheel diameter. One of the Pr2 engines achieved 144 km/h during a test trial run. No. 1803, the final Pr2 in service, was withdrawn in May 1960. Only No. 1800 has been preserved at Haapamäki.

== Gallery ==
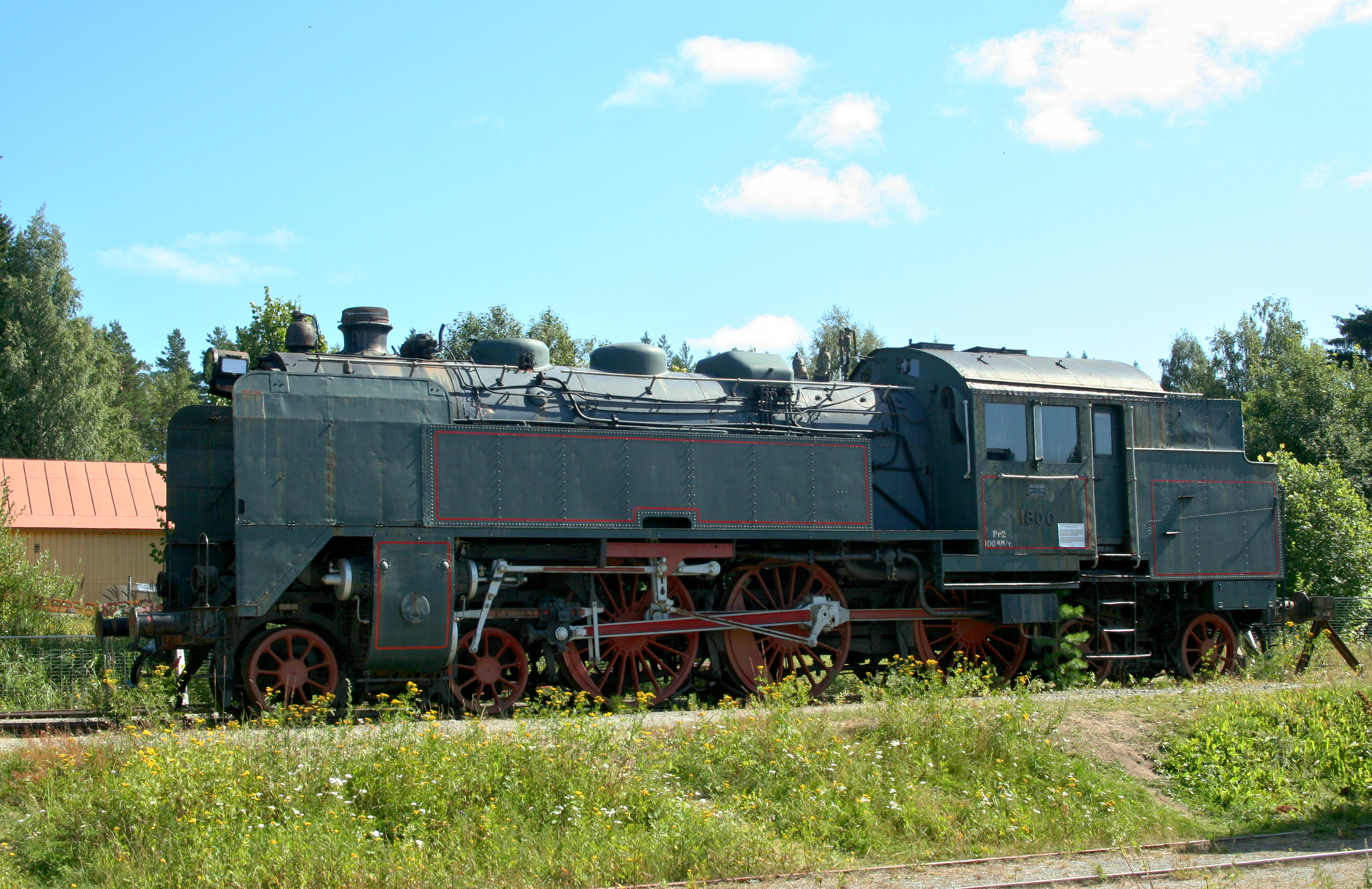
Pr2 1800 at Haapamäki

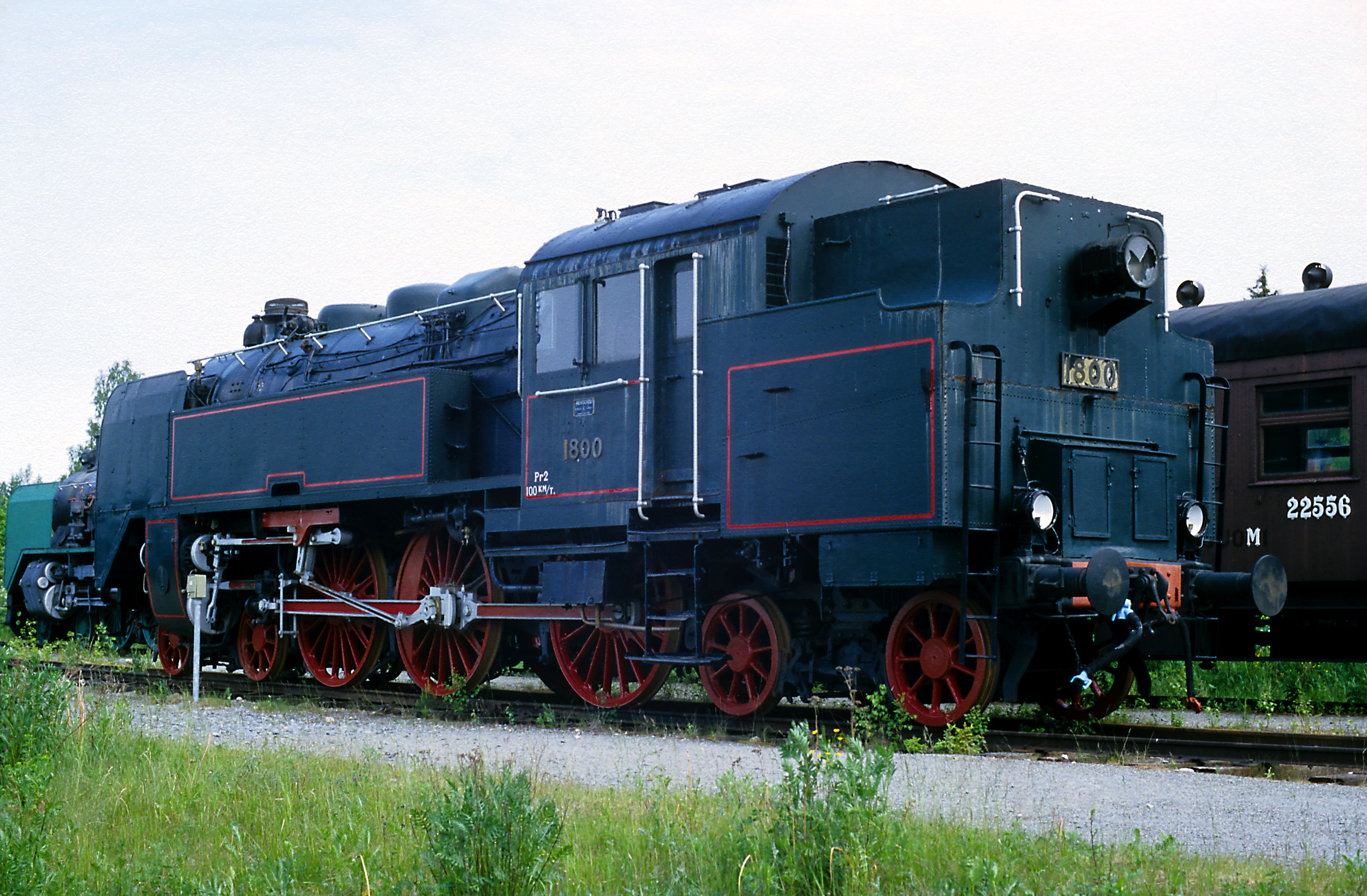
Pr2 1800 at Haapamäki

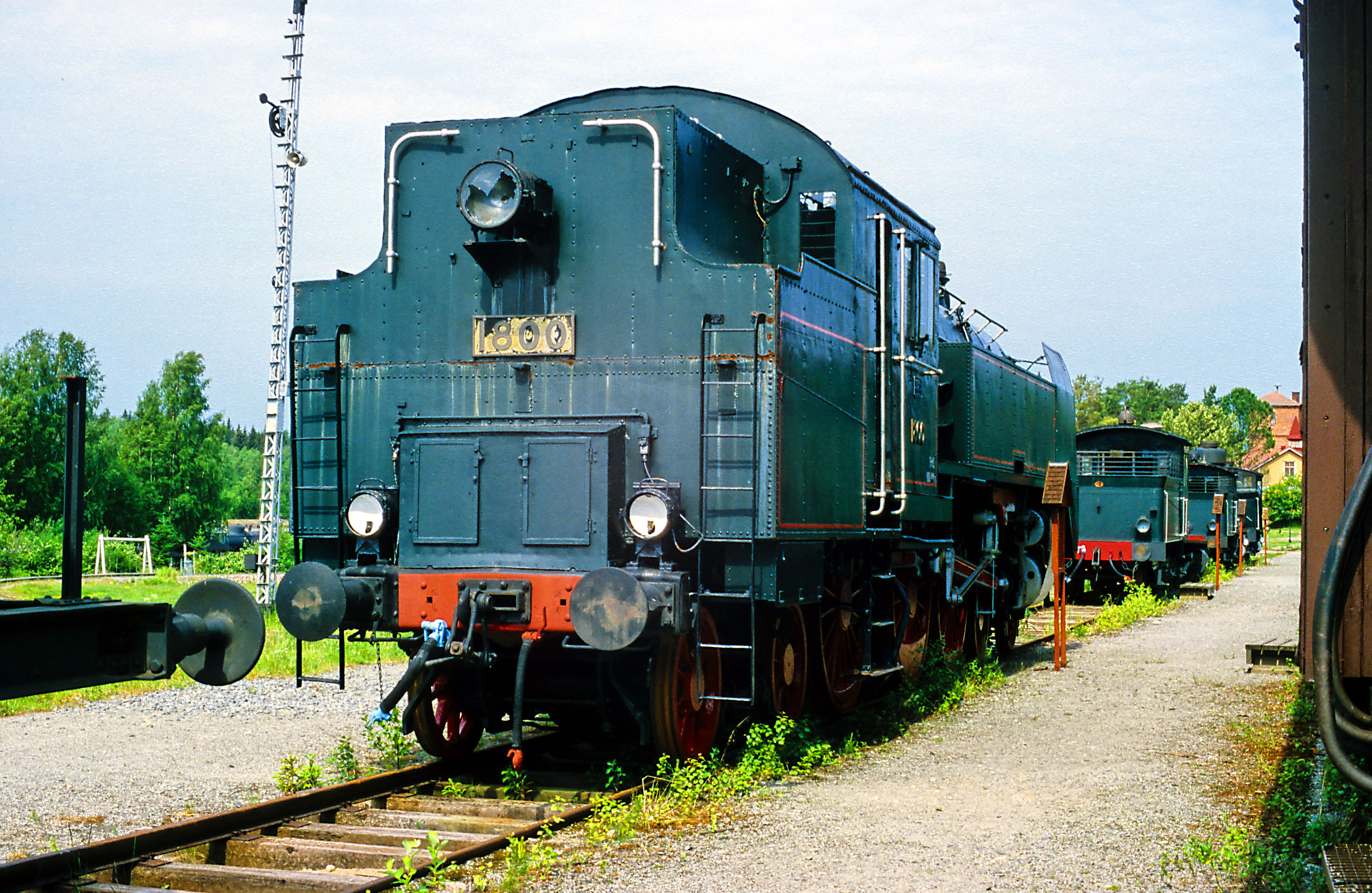
Pr2 1800 at Haapamäki

== See also ==
- Finnish Railway Museum
- History of rail transport in Finland
- Jokioinen Museum Railway
- List of Finnish locomotives
- VR Class Hr1
- VR Class Hr11
- VR Class Pr1
- VR Class Tk3
- VR Group
