= VR Class Vr1 =

Class of Finnish steam locomotives

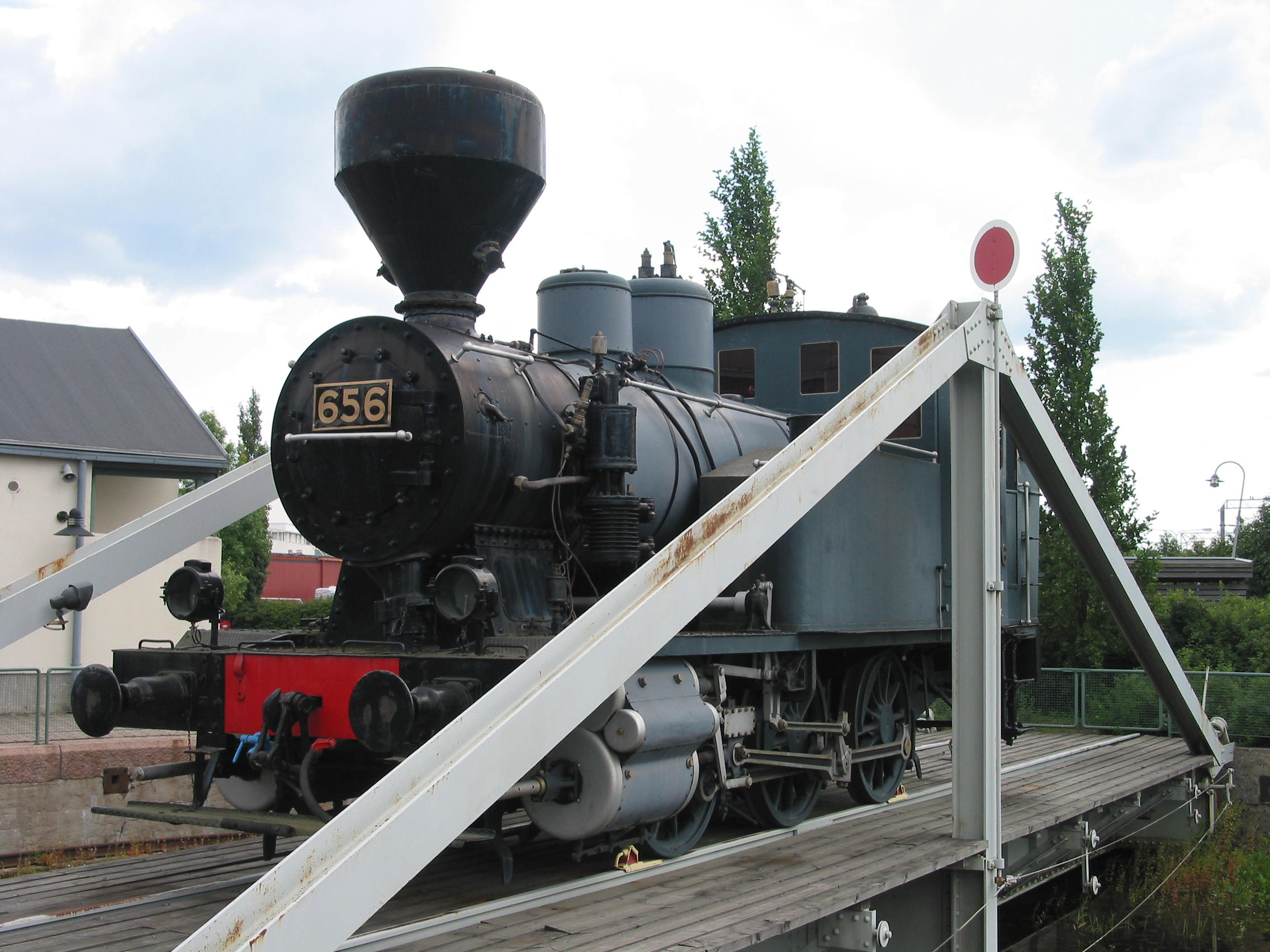
- Vr Class Vr1 0-6-0T steam locomotive no. 656 "Kana" ("Hen") on a turntable outside Salo Art Museum in Salo
Type and origin
- Power type: Steam
- Builder: Tampella and Hanomag
- Build date: 1913–1927
- Total produced: 43
Specifications
- Configuration
  - Whyte: 0-6-0T
- Gauge: 1,524 mm (5 ft)
- Length: 9.145 m (30 ft 0 in)
- Loco weight: 44.8 tonnes (44.1 long tons; 49.4 short tons)
- Fuel type: Coal or firewood
- Fuel capacity: 2T, 4 m^{3} (140 cu ft)
- Water cap.: 4.5 m^{3} (160 cu ft)
- Firebox
  - Grate area: 1.44 m^{2} (15.5 sq ft)
- Heating surface: 52.9 m^{2} (569 sq ft)
Performance figures
- Maximum speed: 25 km/h (16 mph)
Career
- Numbers: 530–544, 656–670, 787–799
- Nicknames: “Kana” / "Hen"
- First run: 1913
- Withdrawn: 1974
- Disposition: 656 Salo, Finland, 659 Sastamala, 660 Haapamäki, 661 Nummi-Pusula, 663 Brüggen, Germany, 665 Pieksämäki, 666 Haapamäki, 667 Kotka, 669 Finnish Railway Museum, 670 Imatra, 787 Haapamäki, 788 Haapamäki, 789 Haapamäki, 792,794 Acton, Suffolk, England; 795 Båtvik, 799 Sellindge, Kent, England

Before 1942, the VR Class Vr1 were originally classified as L1. The Vr1 was a powerful and effective locomotive. Part of them were built by Tampella and part by Hannoversche Maschinenbau AG of Germany. They were numbered 530–544, 656–670, 787–799 and were nicknamed “Kana” ("Hen"). They were operation from 1913-1974.

== Preservation ==
| Number | Manufacturer | Built | Works No. | Location | Notes | Image |
|---|---|---|---|---|---|---|
| 656 | Tampella | 1921 | 310 | Salo (1998–) | Salon taidemuseo Veturitalli | |
| 659 | Tampella | 1921 | 313 | Vammala, Sastamala | Shell in the gas station parking lot | |
| 660 | Tampella | 1921 | 314 | Haapamäki, Keuruu | | |
| 661 | Hanomag | 1921 | 9589 | Nummi-Pusula | | |
| 663 | Hanomag | 1921 | 9591 | Brüggen, Germany | | |
| 665 | Hanomag | 1921 | 9593 | Pieksämäki | | |
| 666 | Hanomag | 1923 | 10261 | Haapamäki, Keuruu | | |
| 667 | Hanomag | 1923 | 10262 | Kotka | | |
| 669 | Hanomag | 1923 | 10264 | Finnish Railway Museum, Hyvinkää | | |
| 670 | Hanomag | 1923 | 10265 | Salzgitter, Germany | | |
| 787 | Tampella | 1927 | 368 | Pasila, Helsinki | | |
| 788 | Tampella | 1927 | 369 | Haapamäki, Keuruu | | |
| 789 | Tampella | 1927 | 370 | Haapamäki, Keuruu | Operational from 1997–?. Appears in the movie Vääpeli Mynkhausen | |
| 792 | Tampella | 1927 | 373 | England (1990–) | | |
| 794 | Tampella | 1925 | 350 | Acton, Suffolk | Number 781 until 1932 | |
| 795 | Tampella | 1925 | 351 | Båtvik, Kirkkonummi | Number 782 until 1932 | |
| 799 | Tampella | 1925 | 355 | Sellindge, England (1990–) | Number 786 until 1948 | |

== Gallery ==
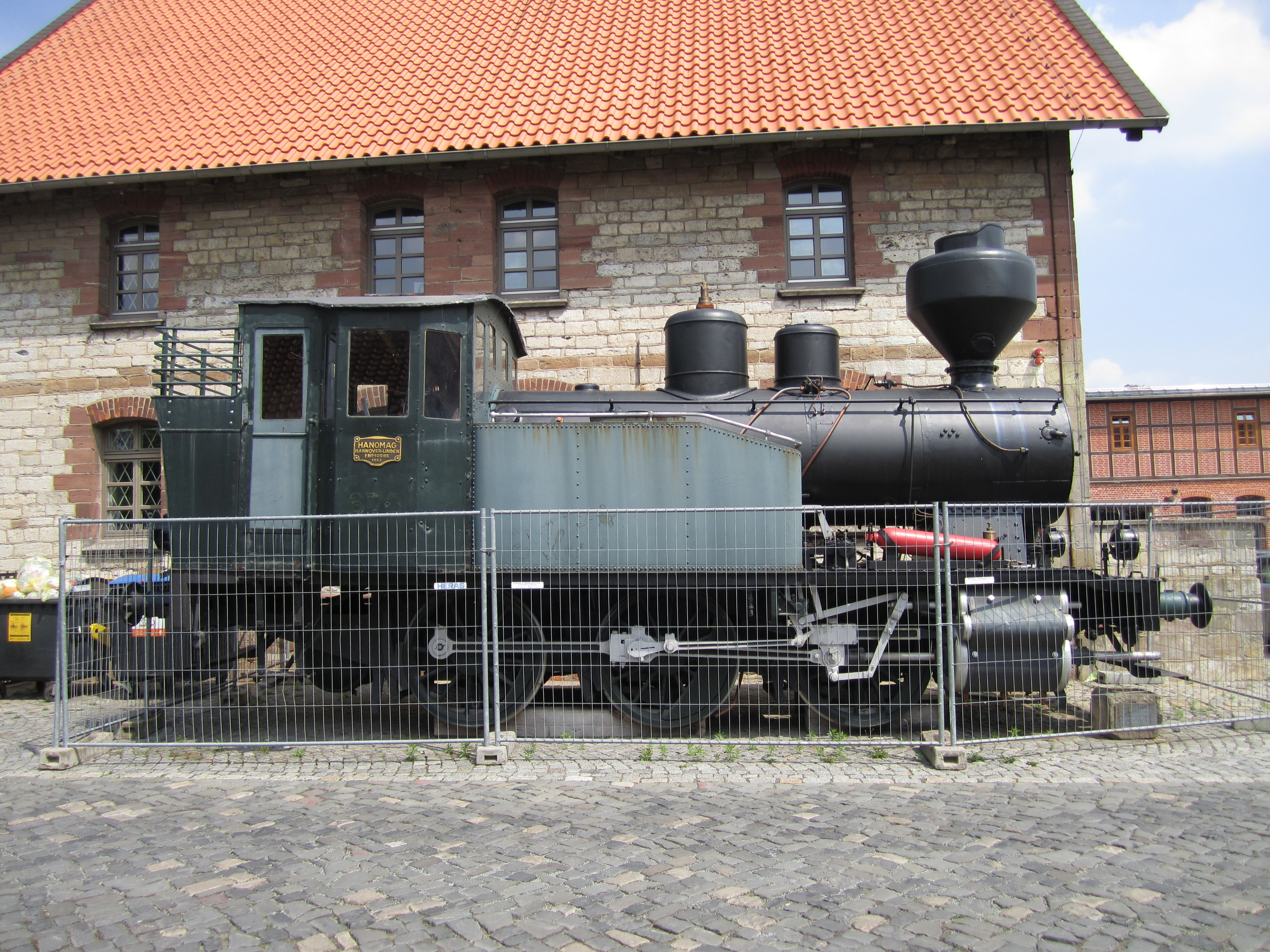
VR Class Vr1 steam locomotive No. 670. Built by Hanomag in Hannover-Linden, Lower Saxony, Germany in 1923 as No. 10265. Now on display at the salder castle museum in Salzgitter-Salder, Lower Saxony, Germany.

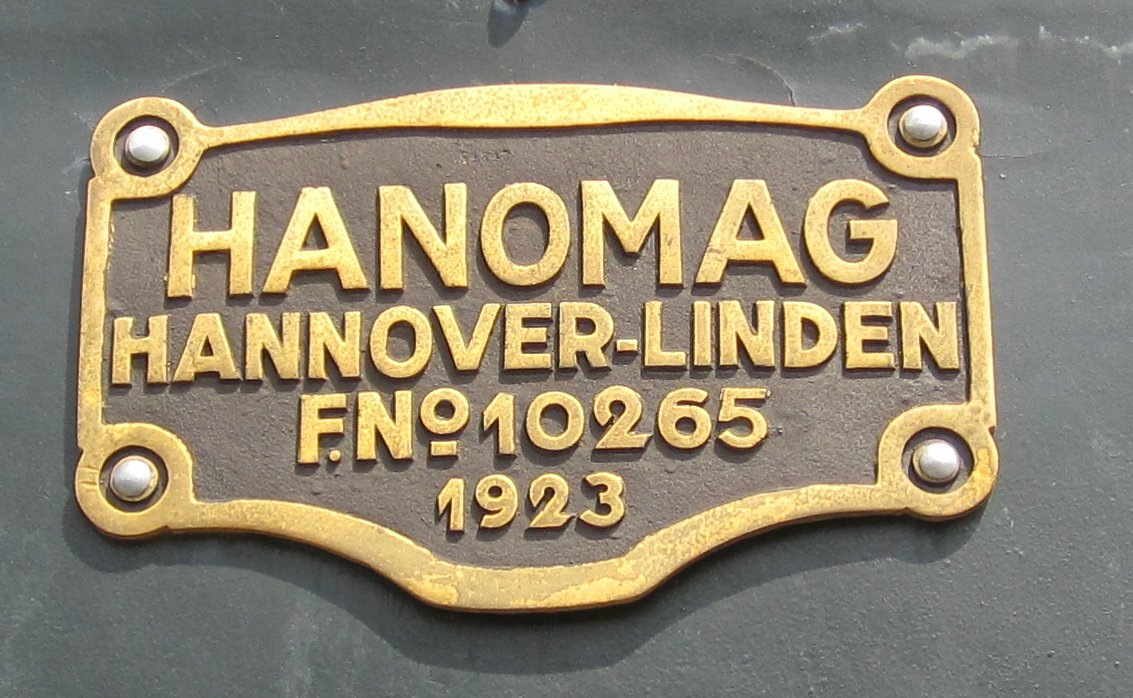
VR Class Vr1 steam locomotive No. 670. Built by Hanomag in Hannover-Linden, Lower Saxony, Germany in 1923 as No. 10265. Now on display at the salder castle museum in Salzgitter-Salder, Lower Saxony, Germany.

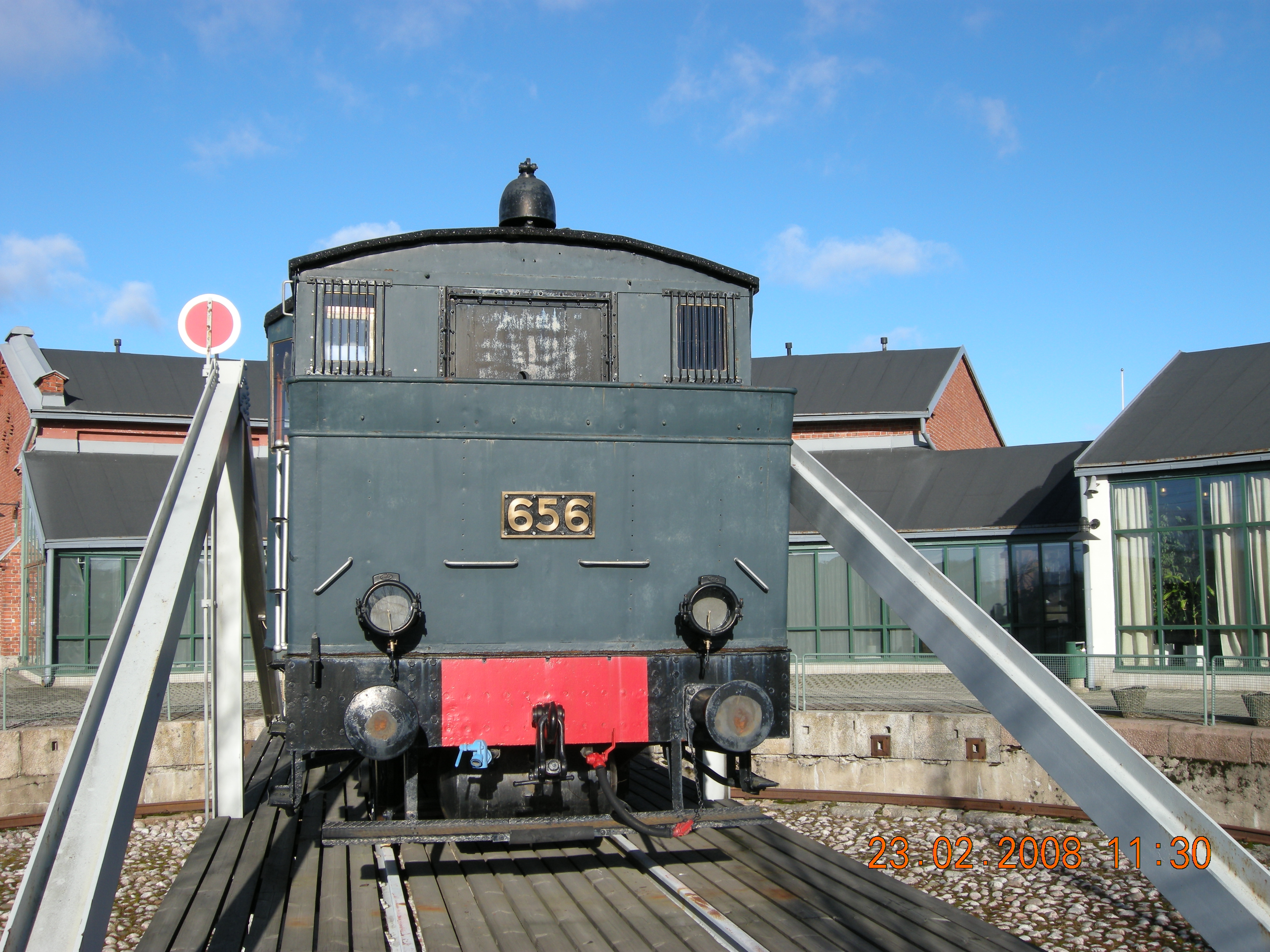
Vr Class Vr1 steam locomotive no. 656 on a turntable outside Salo Art Museum in Salo, Finland

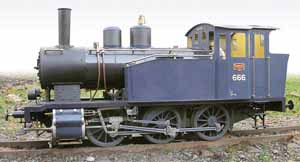
A 1:8 live steam scale model of a VR Class Vr1 type 0-6-0 tank locomotive from 1914.

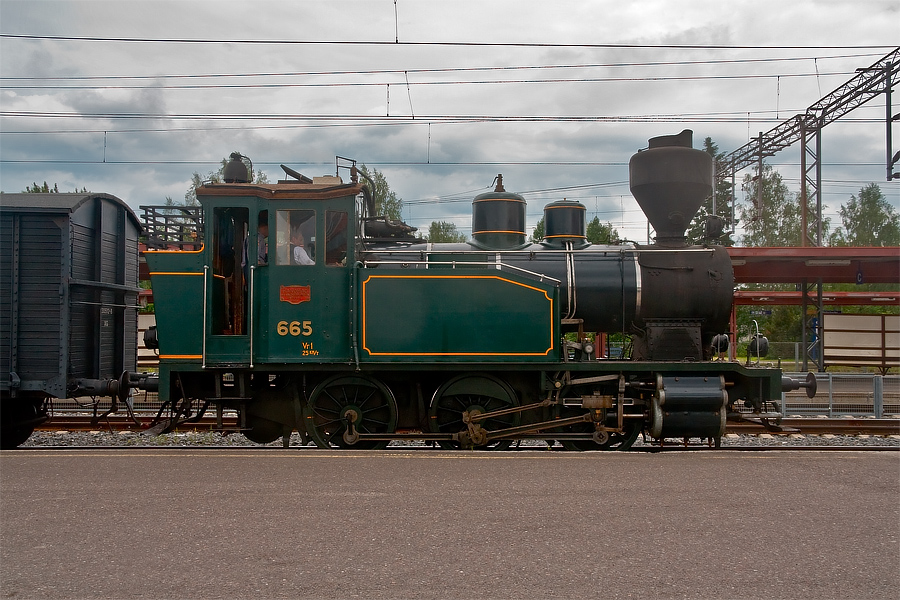
VR Class Vr1 #665 (ex-VR Class L1 #665) in Pieksämäki

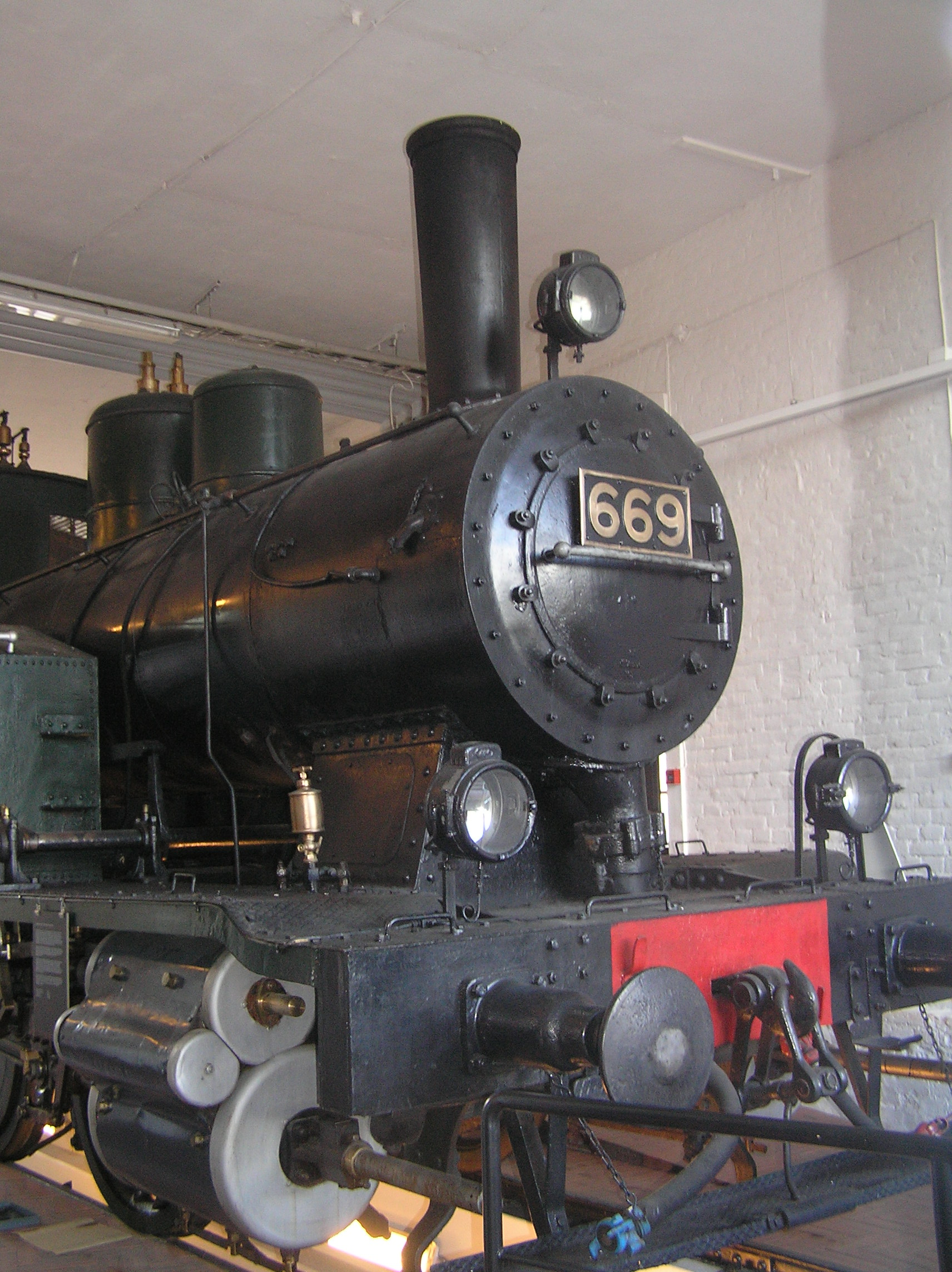
Finnish Steam Locomotive Class Vr1 No 669 preserved at the Finnish Railway Museum

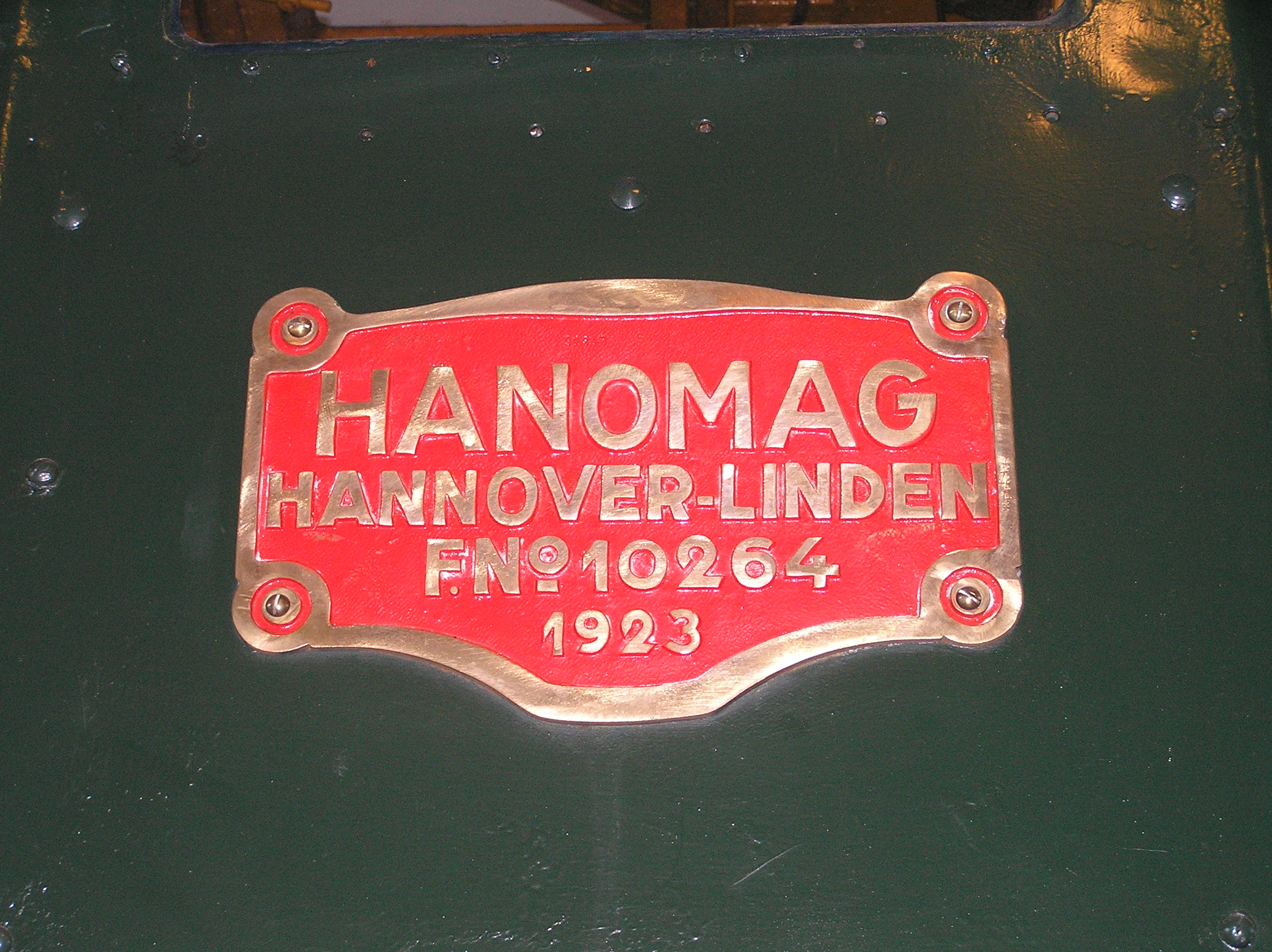
Builder's Plate of Finnish Steam Locomotive Class Vr1 No 669 preserved at the Finnish Railway Museum

== See also ==
- Finnish Railway Museum
- History of rail transport in Finland
- Jokioinen Museum Railway
- List of Finnish locomotives
- VR Class Pr1
- VR Class Hr1
- VR Class Tk3
- VR Group
