= VR Class Vk4 =

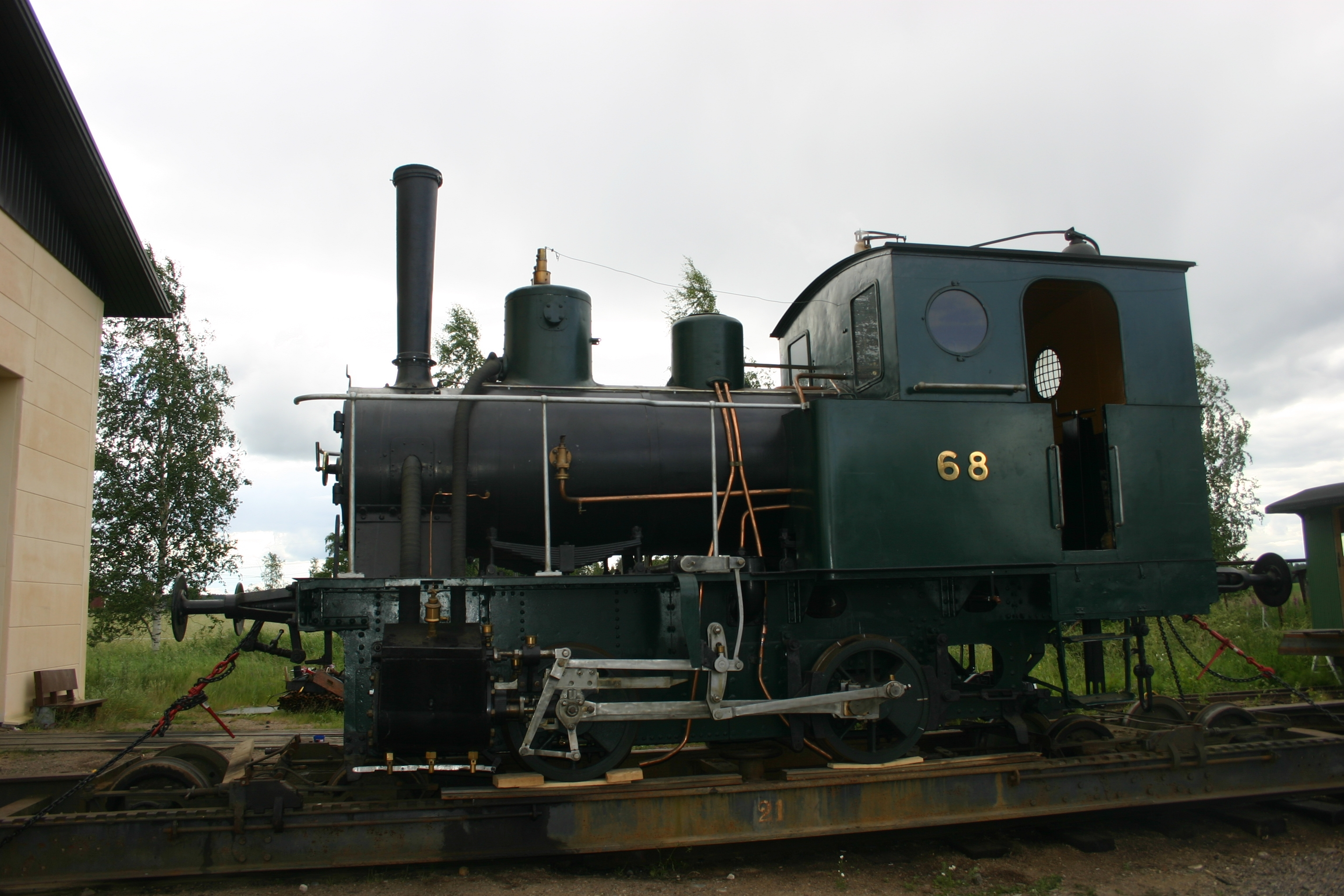
- VR Class Vk4 steam locomotive no. 68 at the Finnish Railway Museum
Type and origin
- Power type: Steam
- Builder: Borsig Lokomotiv Werke (AEG)
- Order number: 7268 and 7858
- Build date: 1909-1910
- Total produced: 2
Specifications
- Configuration
  - Whyte: 0-4-0T
- Gauge: 1,524 mm (5 ft)
- Length: 6.6 m
- Loco weight: 18 tonnes (18 long tons; 20 short tons)
- Fuel type: Coal or wood
Career
- Numbers: 68
- Nicknames: “Leena”
- First run: 1909
- Withdrawn: 1967
- Disposition: 68 Finnish Railway Museum

The locomotive that came to form VR Class Vk4 was originally one of a pair of 0-4-0T locomotives ordered from Rheinmetall Borsig Lokomotiv Werke (AEG), Germany to work at Ino fortress at Terijoki on the Karelian Isthmus. The locomotives had 2 axles, they were the wet-steam type, and used a slip-Walschaert valve gear. Production numbers and years were 7268/1909 and 7858/1910. The fortress was in Finnish hands when Finland became independent.

The fortress was not needed after the Treaty of Tartu in 1920. It was therefore decided to cancel the order for the locomotives. But this was not possible so it was decided to use the locomotives in the dismantling of the fortress. In 1919, the second locomotive, 7858/1910, was sold to as an industrial locomotive. The first locomotive continued to work dismantling the fort until 1922 when it was acquired by a building company in Hanko. After this the locomotive was sold to Enqvist Ltd Ab, Tampere who scrapped it in 1951.

The second locomotive was purchased by the VR Kuopio depot and given the running number 68. The locomotive was still running in the 1960s. The locomotive was used until 1962 and finally withdrawn in 1967. In the early 1980s it was restored externally and placed in the Kuopio locomotive shed. It was discovered in 1986 by Savo Steam Transport Museum. Unfortunately, the museum project floundered and the locomotive was plinthed outside a restaurant.

In 2008 it was decided to restore the locomotive. On 24 March 2009, the locomotive was moved to Hyvinkää workshop, where ultrasound measurements were taken. The final restoration was carried out by ABB Services and the Jokioinen Museum Railway, where the locomotive arrived on 8 May 2009. The locomotive was presented to the public on 17 June 2010.

The locomotive is currently situated at the Finnish Railway Museum, and is steamed up several times every summer.

== See also ==
- Finnish Railway Museum
- VR Group
- List of Finnish locomotives
- Jokioinen Museum Railway
- History of rail transport in Finland
- VR Class Pr1
- VR Class Hr1
- VR Class Tk3
