= VR Class Hv1 =

Class of Finnish steam locomotives

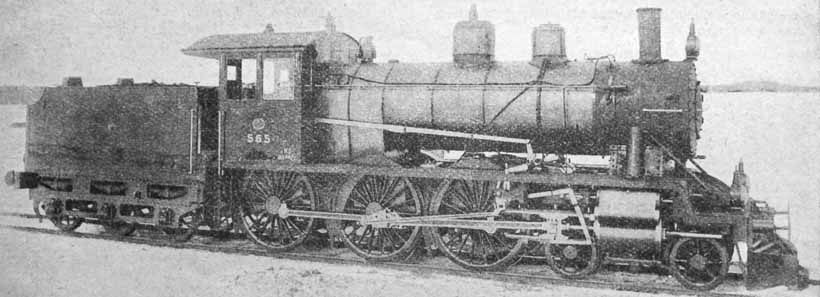
- VR Class Hv1 4-6-0, built by Tampella in 1915
Type and origin
- Power type: Steam
- Builder: Tampella, Lokomo
- Build date: 1915–21
- Total produced: 42
Specifications
- Configuration
  - Whyte: 4-6-0
- Gauge: 1,524 mm (5 ft)
- Loco weight: 88.5 tonnes (87.1 long tons; 97.6 short tons)
- Fuel type: Coal or firewood
- Fuel capacity: 3.5 t (3.4 long tons; 3.9 short tons),> 11 m^{3} (390 cu ft)
- Water cap.: 14.3 m^{3} (500 cu ft)
- Firebox
  - Grate area: 1.99 m^{2} (21.4 sq ft)
- Heating surface: 108.6 m^{2} (1,169 sq ft)
Performance figures
- Maximum speed: 95 km/h (59 mph)
Career
- Numbers: 545–578, 648–655
- Nicknames: "Heikki", Locomotive number 555 was called "Princess"
- First run: 1915
- Withdrawn: 1967
- Disposition: 3 preserved. No. 554 is plinthed in Riihimäki, No. 575 is plinthed next to the Lokomo factory in Tampere. No. 555 is at the Finnish Railway Museum.

The Finnish VR Class Hv1 (original classification 'H8') was a 4-6-0 express passenger train locomotive. 42 were built between 1915 and 1921. They were numbered 545–578 and 648–655.

Because of the increasing weight of trains, around 1910 there was a need for a more powerful passenger train locomotive, and the Finnish State Railways ordered a new design from Tampella and Lokomo. The initial maximum speed was 80 km/h but this was increased to 95 km/h in 1934. Hv1 locomotives were in use on passenger trains throughout Finland for 50 years. The last of these locomotives was withdrawn in 1967.

The very similar locomotive types Hv2 and Hv3 were built later. The Hv2s were almost identical to the Hv1s, while the Hv3s had longer, 4-axle, 2-truck tenders.

== Preservation ==
Locomotive No. 554 is plinthed in Riihimäki, and No. 575 is located next to the Lokomo factory gate in Tampere. The Finnish Railway Museum has locomotive No. 555 (Tampella No. 264), which was called “Princess”. It was in running order between 1995 and 2000, and is again from 2012 onwards.

== Gallery ==
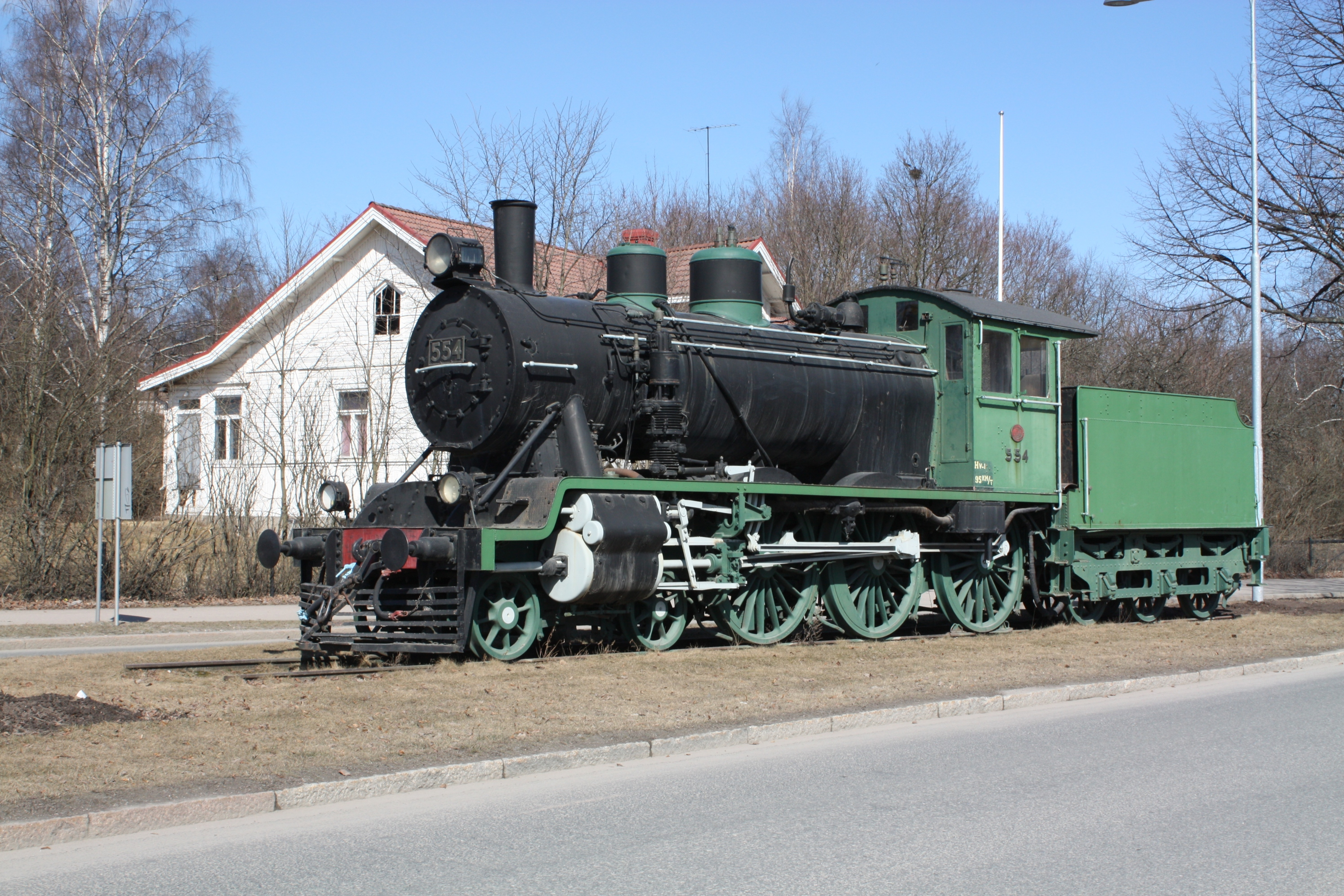
VR Class Hv1 steam locomotive #554 'Heikki' near Riihimäki railway station in Riihimäki

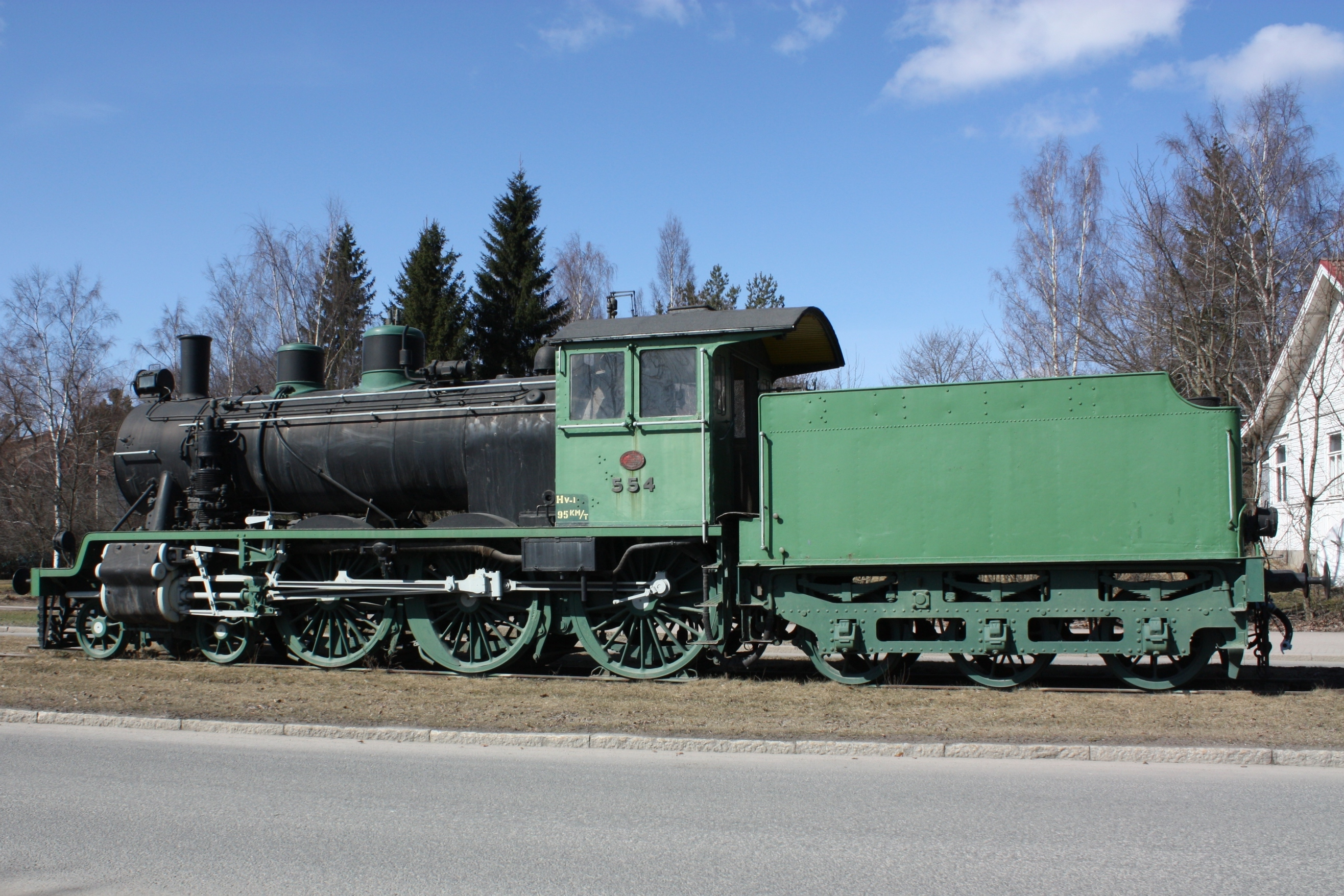
VR Class Hv1 steam locomotive #554 'Heikki' near Riihimäki railway station in Riihimäki

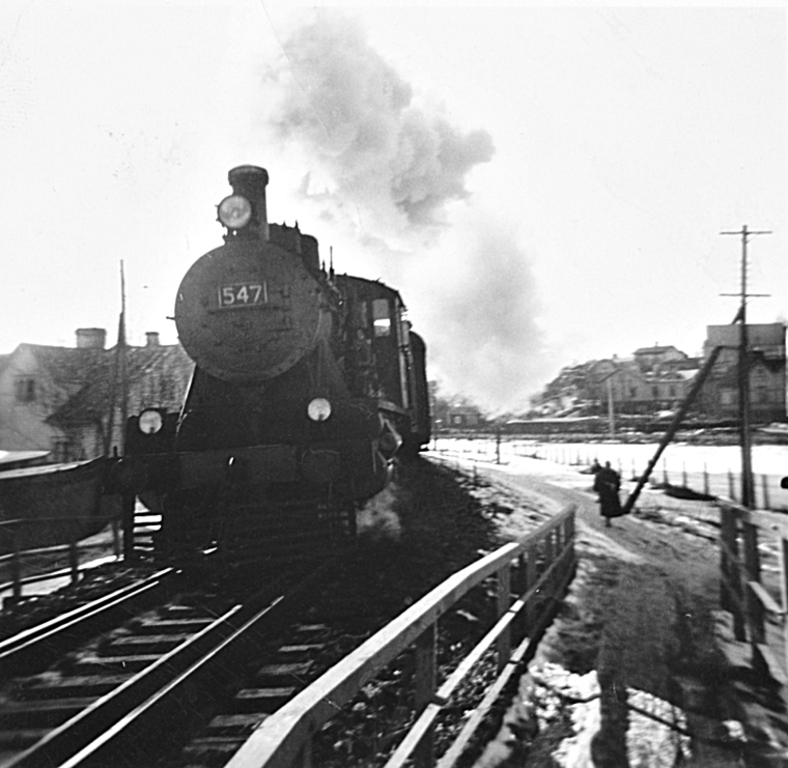
Hv1 No 547 heads an express train from Turku to Helsinki over the River Aura bridge in 1958

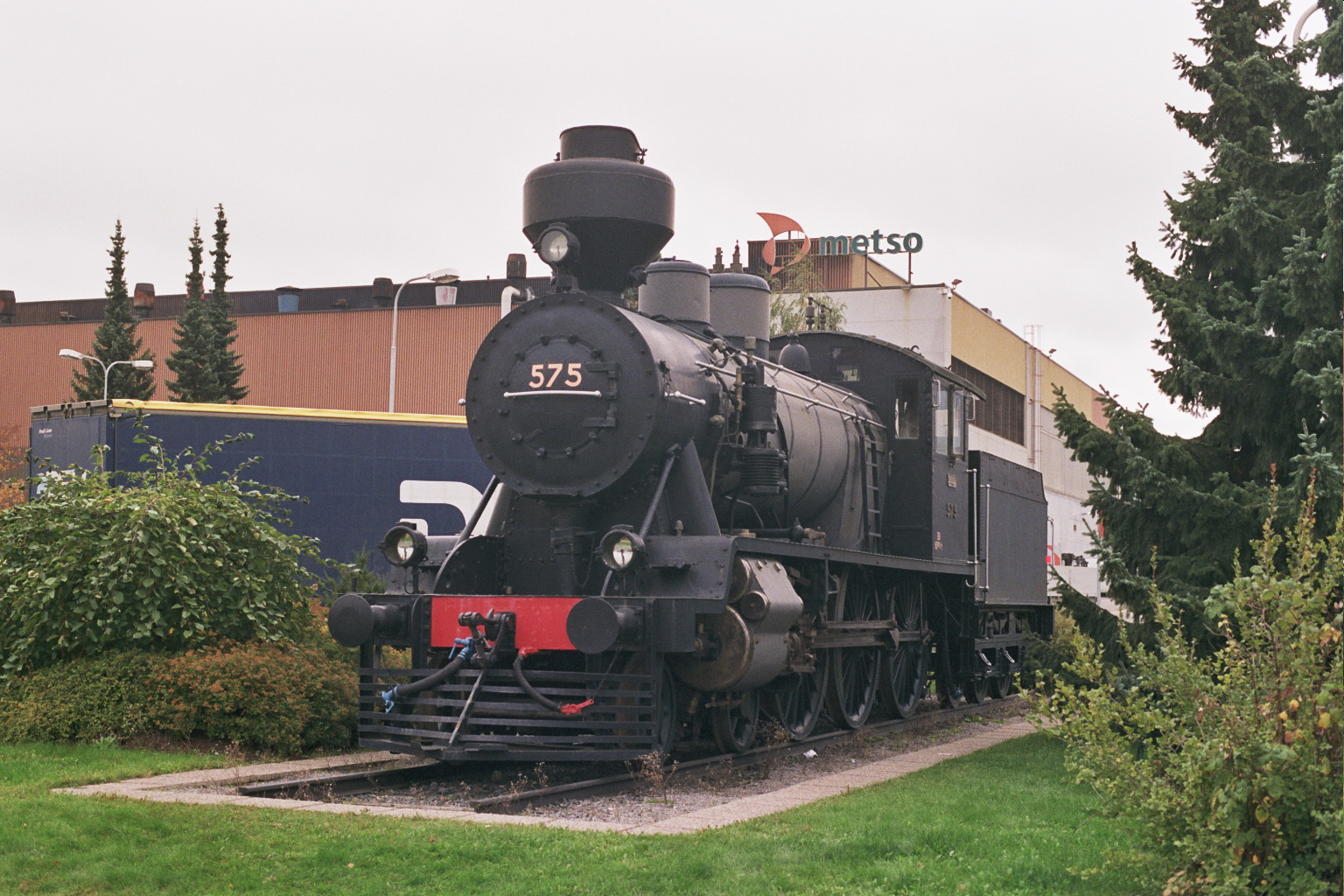
Hv1 class No. 575, preserved in front of Metso Lokomo Steels in Hatanpää, Tampere, Finland. This was the first locomotive manufactured by Lokomo and entered service in 1920.

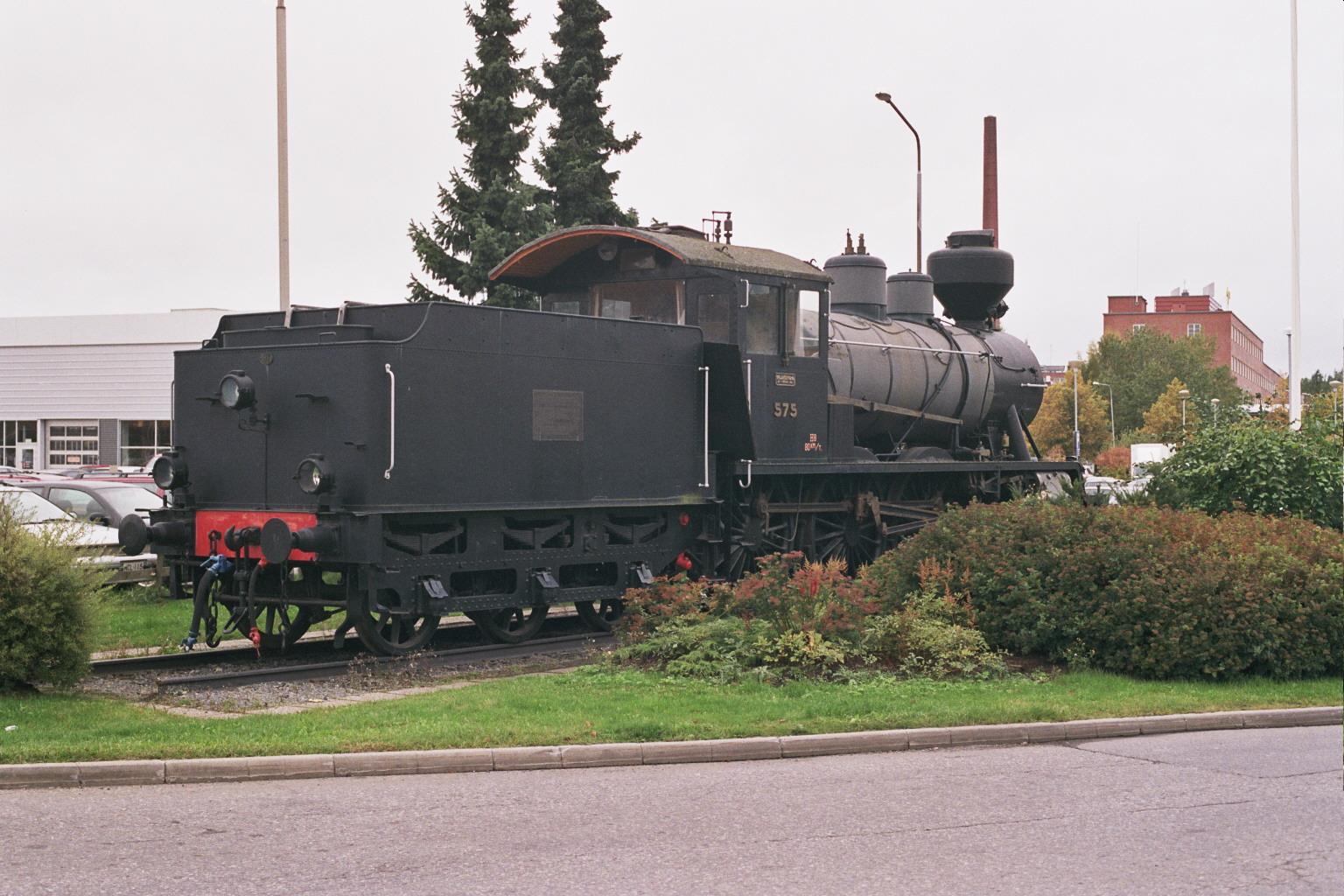
Class Hv1 No. 575 at Metso Lokomo Steels in Hatanpää, Tampere

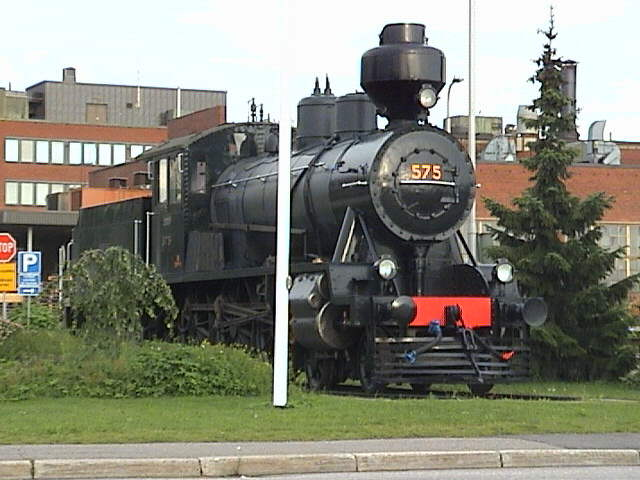
Class Hv1 No. 575 at Metso Lokomo Steels in Hatanpää, Tampere

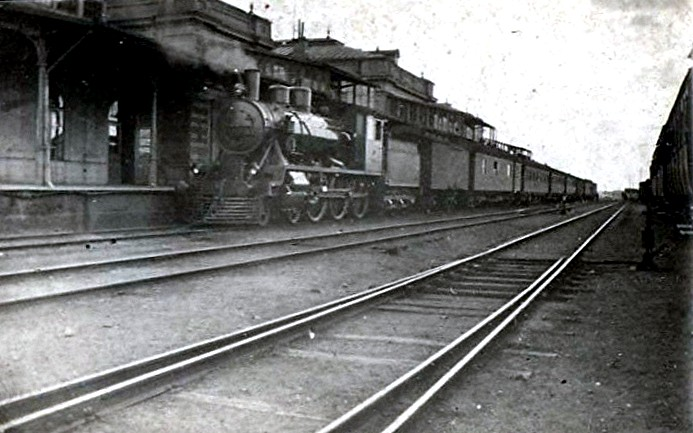
A Hv1) steam locomotive at Turku railway station in the 1920s.

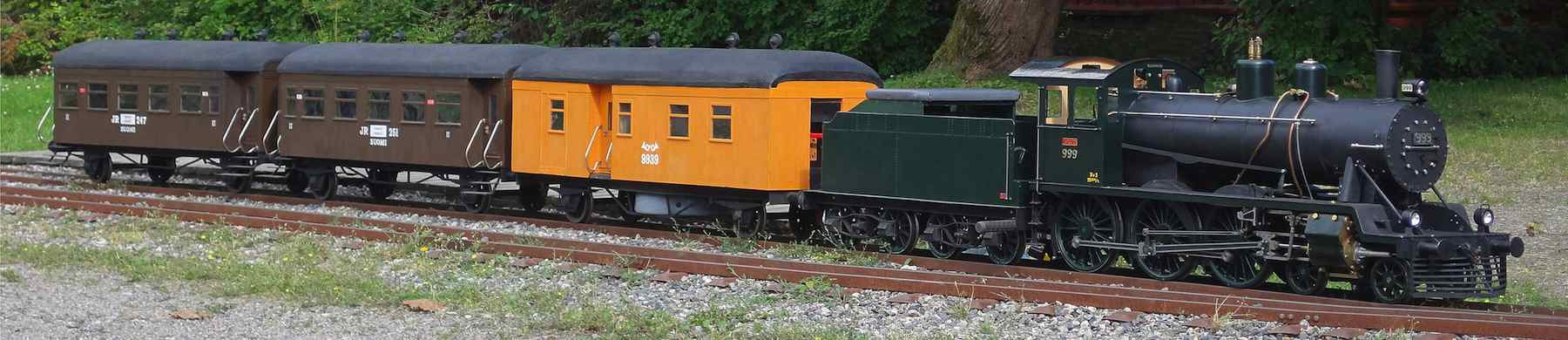
A Live Steam 1:8 scale model of the Hv3 series loco and three wooden coaches. Note the longer, 4-axle tender.

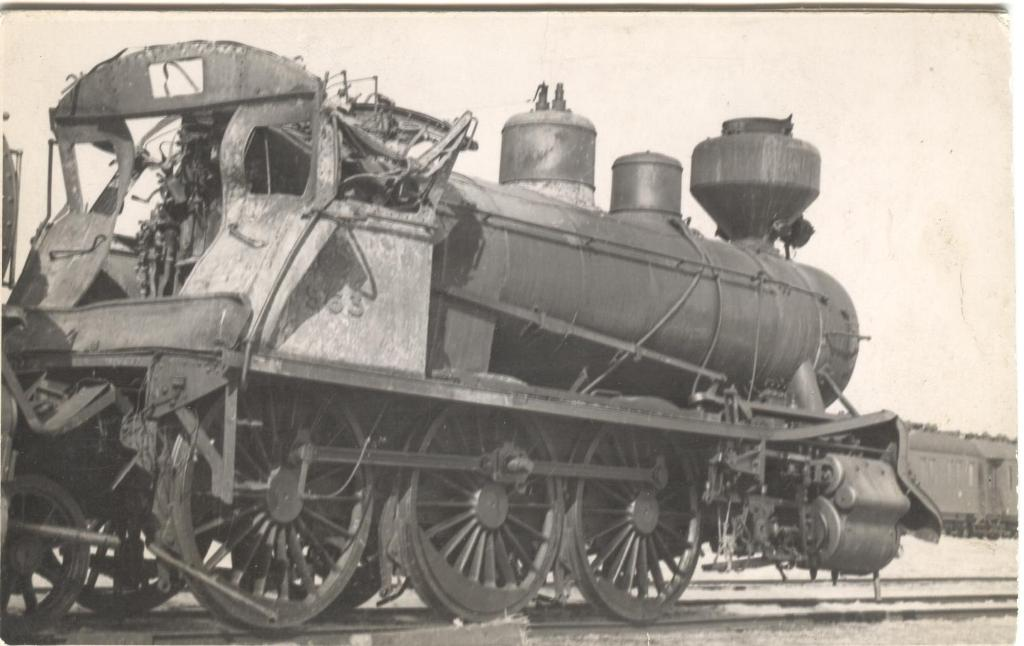
Photograph of a wrecked VR Class Hv1 in Iittala, 4 March 1940. Taken later at a depot.

== See also ==
- Finnish Railway Museum
- History of rail transport in Finland
- Jokioinen Museum Railway
- List of Finnish locomotives
- VR Class Pr1
- VR Class Hr1
- VR Class Tk3
- VR Group
- Rail transport in Finland
