= List of Finnish locomotives =

Coordinates: 60°37′35″N 024°51′02″E

This is a list of locomotives and multiple units that have been used in Finland. VR Group (Coporatised in 1995, previously Valtionrautatiet, Finnish state railways) had a monopoly on passenger traffic until 1.1.2021, but is currently the only passenger operator on the Finnish rail network. Some trainsets are however owned by other companies such as Pääkaupunkiseudun Junakalusto Oy. The Finnish railways are laid to the gauge of 5 ft (1,524 mm).

== Classification system ==
At the beginning of traffic, locomotives were distinguished by their names, and by 1865 also by their numbers. In 1887, the locomotives were given their original classification system. It was based on the wheel arrangement of the locomotives: each wheel arrangement was assigned a letter of the alphabet, which was followed by a serial number. The assignment of letters to different wheel arrangements was made when the first locomotive using it was brought into service; the letter A signified a 4-4-0 wheelbase in the Whyte notation, B signified a 0-4-2ST locomotive, C a 0-6-0 locomotive, and so on.

On 8 October 1942, the notation system was changed to two letters and a serial number. The first letter in the designation now signified the types of trains the locomotive was generally planned to haul:

- H (henkilöjuna) for passenger trains,
- P (paikallisjuna) for local (commuter) trains,
- T (tavarajuna) for freight trains,
- S (sekajuna) for mixed freight-passenger trains and
- V (vaihto, literally "switch") for a switcher locomotive.

The second small letter indicated the weight of the locomotive:

- r (raskas) = heavy (axle load over 14.1 t)
- v (väliraskas) = midweight (axle load 11.1–14.0 t)
- k (kevyt) = light (axle load under 11.0 t)
- m = mechanical transmission (in multiple units)
- s (sähkö 'electric(ity)') = electrical transmission (in multiple units).

When diesel locomotives were taken into service in the 1950s, they were additionally differentiated by the steam locomotive classes by beginning their numbering from 11 instead of the next free number in running order. As a result, the last steam-powered heavy passenger locomotive class was designated Hr3, and its first diesel-powered counterpart Hr11.

The current VR locomotive classification system was taken into use on 1 January 1976. The first (capital) letter was now used to differentiate between locomotive types: S (sähkö) for electric, D for diesel and T (työkone) for maintenance equipment. The serial numbers of diesel locomotive classes were not changed, the Hr11 class becoming Dr11. In addition to this the borderline between midweight and heavy locomotives was changed to 15.1 tons and the second letter in multiple units is always m (for moottorivaunu).

The multiple unit classification system follows a similar logic as the locomotive classification system: the first letter signifies the power source (in addition to electric and diesel, gasoline (B, bensiini) and wood gas (P, puukaasu) have been used), followed by the letter m (moottorivaunu) signifying a multiple unit, followed by a serial number.

== Electric locomotives ==
Image	Class	In service	Numbers	Quantity
	VR Class Sr1	1973–present	3001–3112	112
	VR Class Sr2	1995–present	3201–3246	46
	VR Class Sr3	2017–present	3301–3380	80

== Diesel locomotives ==
Image	Class	In service	Numbers
Lightweight (axle load 8.1–11.1 t)
	VR Class Tve1	1958–1963	406–436
	VR Class Tve5	1978–1979	601–610
Midweight (axle load 11.1–14 t)
	VR Class Tve2 (OTSO2)	1962–1964	441–448
	VR Class Tve3	1950–1960	451–487, 491–495
	VR Class Sv1	1980-1984	3201
	VR Class Sv11	1953–1964	1725 (later 1703)
	VR Class Vv12	1953–1965	1700–1702
	VR Class Dv11 (Note: The Dv11 was known as the Vr11 until 1976.)	1958–1992	1804–1819
	VR Class Dv12 (Note: The Dv12 was known as the Sv12 until 1976, except for units of the 2700 series, which were called Sr12.)	1963–present	2501–2568; 2601–2664; 2701–2760
	VR Class Dv15 (Note: The Dv15 was known as the Vv15 until 1976.)	1958–2004	1955–2012
	VR Class Dv16 (Note: The Dv16 was known as the Vv16 until 1976.)	1962–2008	2013–2040
Heavy (axle load 14 t and up)
	VR Class Tve4	1978–1983	501–540
	VR Class Hr11	1955–1972	1950–1954
	VR Class Dr12 (Note: The Dr12 was known as the Hr12 until 1976.)	1959-1991	2200–2241
	VR Class Dr13 (Note: The Dr13 was known as the Hr13 until 1976.)	1962-2000	2301–2354
	VR Class Dr14	1969–present	1851–1874
	VR Class Dr15	1980	2439 (Note: Dr15 2439 was modified in 1980 from Dr12 2239.)
	VR Class Dr16	1986-present	2801–2823
	Fenniarail Class Dr18	2015–present	101–106
	VR Class Dr19	2023–present	2831-2890
	North Rail Class Dr20	2020–present	29008-29016
	North Rail Class Dr21	2021–present	1562, 1570, 1574

== Petrol-Paraffin locomotives ==
Image	Class	Number	Type	Manufacturer	Wheel arrangement	Built	Notes
	VR Class Vk11	101, 102	Petrol-paraffin locomotive	Ab Slipmaterial, Västervik, and Lokomo	B	1930, 1936	101 preserved at the Finnish Railway Museum

=== Petrol-Paraffin locomotive references ===
Data from:

- Finnish Railway Museum official website

== Steam locomotives ==
Image	Class	In service	Numbers	Type	Manufacturer	Wheel arrangement	Notes (including nickname)
	Finnish Steam Locomotive Class A1	1860–1911	1–6	Passenger Steam Locomotive	Canada Works, Peto, Brassey and Betts	4-4-0	
	Finnish Steam Locomotive Class A2	1866–	7–8	Passenger Steam Locomotive	Canada Works	4-4-0	
	Finnish Steam Locomotive Class A3	1869–	11–20, 44–47, 178–182, 222–227	Passenger Steam Locomotive	Dübs & Company	4-4-0	
	Finnish Steam Locomotive Class A4	1872–1918	63–71	Passenger Steam Locomotive	Baldwin Locomotive Works	4-4-0	Website about the Hanko–Hyvinkää 4-4-0 and Baldwin locomotives used in Finland
	Finnish Steam Locomotive Class A5	1874– 1927	57–58	Passenger Steam Locomotive	Helsingfors / VRHki Valtionrautatiet, Helsingin konepaja	4-4-0	“Lankkihattu”; No 58 preserved at the Finnish Railway Museum
	Finnish Steam Locomotive Class A6	1874–	59–61, 90–99	Passenger Steam Locomotive	G. Sigl Locomotiv-Fabrik	4-4-0	
	Finnish Steam Locomotive Class A7	1898–	228–231	Passenger Steam Locomotive	Swiss Locomotive & Machine Works	4-4-0	
	Finnish Steam Locomotive Class B1	1868–1928	9–10, 53–56, 150–151	Shunter Steam Locomotive	Beyer, Peacock & Company	0-4-2ST	“Ram”, No 9 preserved at the Finnish Railway Museum. The oldest preserved locomotive in Finland.
	Finnish Steam Locomotive Class B2	1880–	100	Shunter Steam Locomotive	Beyer, Peacock & Company	0-4-2ST	
	Finnish Steam Locomotive Class C1	1869–1926	21–30	Freight Steam Locomotive	Neilson & Company No 1427	0-6-0	“Bristollari”, No 21 preserved at the Finnish Railway Museum. The second oldest preserved locomotive in Finland.
	Finnish Steam Locomotive Class C2	1869–	31–43, 48–52	Freight Steam Locomotive	Avonside Engine Company, Bristol	0-6-0	“Bristollari”
	Finnish Steam Locomotive Class C3	1872–?	74–75	Freight Steam Locomotive		0-6-0	
	Finnish Steam Locomotive Class C4	1875–?	62, 78–89	Freight Steam Locomotive		0-6-0	
	Finnish Steam Locomotive Class C5	1881–1930	101–114	Freight Steam locomotive	Hanomag, Hannover No 1477	0-6-0	“Bliksti”, No 110 preserved at the Finnish Railway Museum
	Finnish Steam Locomotive Class C6		100	Freight Steam Locomotive		0-6-0	
	Finnish Steam Locomotive Class D1		72–73			2-4-0	
	Finnish Steam Locomotive Class E1	1875–?	76–77			0-4-0WT	
	Finnish Steam Locomotive Class R2		74–75			2-6-2WT	
	Finnish Steam Locomotive Class F1	1885–1935	63–64, 115–116,132–133	Passenger Steam Locomotive	Swiss Locomotive & Machine Works Societe Suisse No 434	0-4-4RT	“Felix”, No 132 preserved at the Finnish Railway Museum
	Finnish Steam Locomotive Class F2	1899–?	65		Baldwin Locomotive Works	2-4-2RT	
	Finnish Steam Locomotive Class M1	1913–?	66		Tampella	2-8-0T	
	VR Class Hk1 (Finnish Steam Locomotive Class H1 & H2)	1898–1959	232–241,291–300,322–333	Mixed Traffic Steam Locomotive	Baldwin Locomotive Works built 232–241, Richmond Locomotive Works built 291–300, 322–333	4-6-0	“Big-Wheel Kaanari”, No 293 preserved at the Finland Station, St.Petersburg, Russia
	VR Class Hk2 (Finnish Steam Locomotive Class H3)		437–446,448–451	Mixed Traffic Steam Locomotive		4-6-0	
	VR Class Hk3 (Finnish Steam Locomotive Classes H3, H4 & H5)		447,452–453,471–486	Mixed Traffic Steam Locomotive		4-6-0	
	VR Class Hk5 (Finnish Steam Locomotive Class H6)	1909–1959	439–515	Mixed Traffic Steam Locomotive		4-6-0	No. 497 is preserved at Haapamäki
	VR Class Hr1 (Finnish Steam Locomotive Class P1)	1937–1974	1000–1021	Passenger Steam Locomotive	Lokomo Oy and Tampella Oy	4-6-2	“Ukko-Pekka”; Not in service 1972; Returned to Service due to oil crisis
	VR Class Hr2 (Finnish Steam Locomotive Class H11)	1942–1953	1900–1906	Passenger Steam Locomotive	NOHAB	4-6-0	“Hurricane”;
	VR Class Hr3 (Finnish Steam Locomotive Class H11)	1942–1953	1907–1919	Passenger Steam Locomotive	NOHAB	4-6-0	“Hurricane”;
	VR Class Hv1 (Finnish Steam Locomotive Class H8)	1915–1967	545–578,648–655	Passenger Steam Locomotive	Tampella, Tampereen Pellava- ja Rautateollisuus Oy; Lokomo Oy	4-6-0	"Heikki", Hv1 555 only was nicknamed "Princess"; No 555 preserved at the Finnish Railway Museum
	VR Class Hv2 (Finnish Steam Locomotive Class H9)	1919–1968	579–593,671–684,777–780	Passenger Steam Locomotive	L. Schwartzkopff and Lokomo	4-6-0	“Heikki”, No 680 is preserved at Haapamäki
	VR Class Hv3 (Finnish Steam Locomotive Class H9)	1921–1970	638–647,781–785,991–999	Passenger Steam Locomotive	Tampella, Tampereen Pellava- ja Rautateollisuus Oy; L. Schwartzkopff and Lokomo	4-6-0	“Heikki”, The following are preserved No 781 Kerava, No 995 Suolahti, No 998 Haapamäki Detailed drawings of a VR Class Hv3
	VR Class Hv4 (Finnish Steam Locomotive Class H7)	1912–1964	516–529,742–751,757–760	Passenger Steam Locomotive	Lokomo Oy and Tampella Oy	4-6-0	“Pikku-Heikki”, Nos 742 & 751 are preserved Haapamäki
	VR Class Pr1 (Finnish Steam Locomotive Class N1)	1924–1972	761–776	Local Passenger Steam Locomotive	Hanomag; Tampella Tampereen Pellava- ja Rautateollisuus Oy, Lokomo Oy	2-8-2T	“Paikku”, No 776 preserved at the Finnish Railway Museum
	VR Class Pr2	1942–1960	1800–1803	Local Passenger Steam Locomotive	Henschel & Son	4-6-4T	"Henschel" No 1800 preserved at Haapamäki
	VR Class Rro	1914–?	1–2		Tampella Tampereen Pellava- ja Rautateollisuus Oy	0-4-0T	No. 2 preserved at the Finnish Railway Museum
	VR Class Sk1 (Finnish Steam Locomotive Classes G1, G2 & G4)	1885–	117–131,134–149,152–172,183–190	Mixed Traffic Steam Locomotive	Swiss Locomotive & Machine Works Societe Suisse No 405	2-6-0	“Little Brown”; No 124 preserved at the Finnish Railway Museum
	VR Class Sk2 (Finnish Steam Locomotive Classes G1, G6 & G9)	1896–1963	196–213,314–321,360–372	Mixed Traffic Steam Locomotive	Tampella	2-6-0	No 315 is preserved at Tampere, Tampella
	VR Class Sk3 (Finnish Steam Locomotive Classes G3, G5, G10 & G11)	1892–1960	173–177,191–195,214–221,334–359,373–406,427–436	Mixed Traffic Locomotive	Tampella Tammerfors Linne-&Jern-Manufakt.A.B. No 49	2-6-0,	“Grandmother”; No 400 preserved at the Finnish Railway Museum
	VR Class Sk4 (Finnish Steam Locomotive Class G7)	1898-1960	242–253,306–313	Mixed Traffic Steam Locomotive	Baldwin Locomotive Works	2-6-0	"Little-Wheel Kaanari"
	VR Class Sk5 (Finnish Steam Locomotive Class G12)		66–67	Mixed Traffic Steam Locomotive		2-6-0	
	VR Class Sk6 (Finnish Steam Locomotive Class G8)	1898-1950	254–270	Mixed Traffic Steam Locomotive	Richmond Locomotive Works	2-6-0	“Riksmont”
	VR Class Tk1 (Finnish Steam Locomotive Class K1)	1899-1959	271–290	Freight Steam Locomotive	Baldwin Locomotive Works	2-8-0	“Amerikan Satikka”
	VR Class Tk2 (Finnish Steam Locomotive Class K2)	1903–1960	407–426, 457–470			2-8-0	“Satikka”, The following are preserved 407 Närpes, 418 Junction City, Oregon, USA, 419 Haapamäki
	VR Class Tk3 (Finnish Steam Locomotive Class K5)	1927–1975	800–899,1100–1118,1129–1170	Freight Steam Locomotive	Tampella, Lokomo and Frichs	2-8-0	“The Little Jumbo”
	VR Class Tr1 (Finnish Steam Locomotive Class R1)	1940–1975	1030–1096	Freight Steam Locomotive	Tampella, Tampere / Lokomo, Tampere / Arnold Jung Lokomotivfabrik GmbH, Jungenthal	2-8-2	“Risto”, 1033 and 1096 preserved at the Finnish Railway Museum
	VR Class Tr2	1946–1968	1300–1319		ALCO (10), Baldwin Locomotive Works (10)	2-10-0	Nicknamed “Truman”. Similar to Russian locomotive class Ye. No 1319 preserved at the Finnish Railway Museum
	VR Class Tv1 (Finnish Steam Locomotive Class K3)	1917–1974	594–617,685–741,900–948,1200–1211		Tampella,	2-8-0	“Jumbo”, The following are preserved no. 609 Haapamäki, no. 933 veturimuseo at Toijala, no 940 Lapinlahti, and no 943 Ylivieska
	VR Class Tv2 (Finnish Steam Locomotive Class K4)		618–637		ALCO	2-8-0	“Wilson”
	VR Class Vk1 (Finnish Steam Locomotive Class I1)	1900–1952	301–305	Local Passenger Steam Locomotive	Baldwin Locomotive Works	2-6-4T	“Amerikan”, “Iita”
	VR Class Vk2 (Finnish Steam Locomotive Class I2)		454–455	Local Passenger Steam Locomotive		2-6-4T	“Iita”
	VR Class Vk3 (Finnish Steam Locomotive Class I3)	1906–1964	456, 487–492	Local Passenger Steam Locomotive	Tampella, Tampereen Pellava- ja Rautateollisuus Oy	2-6-4T	“Iita”, No 489 preserved at the Finnish Railway Museum
	VR Class Vk4	1910–1962	68	Light Replacement Steam Locomotive	Borsig Lokomotiv Werke (AEG)	0-4-0T	"Leena", Oldest working broad gauge locomotive in Finland. No 68 preserved at the Finnish Railway Museum
	VR Class Vk5		72–75			2-8-2T	
	VR Class Vk6		70–71			0-4-4RT	
	VR Class Vr1 (Finnish Steam Locomotive Class L1)	1913–1974	530–544,656–670,787–799	Shunter Steam Locomotive	Hanomag, No 10264	0-6-0T	“Hen”, No 669 preserved at the Finnish Railway Museum
	VR Class Vr2 (Finnish Steam Locomotive Class D1)	1930–1975	950–965	Steam Locomotive	Tampella	0-6-2T	"Duck", The following are preserved in Finland No 950 Joensuu, 951 Tuuri, 953 Haapamäki, 961 Jyväskylä, 964 Veturimuseo at Toijala
	VR Class Vr3 (Finnish Steam Locomotive Class O1)	1924–1975	752–756	Steam Locomotive	Tampella, Hanomag	0-10-0T	"Rooster" / 'Cockerel", No 755 stored at the Finnish Railway Museum
	VR Class Vr4		1400–1423		Vulcan Iron Works	0-6-0T	
	VR Class Vr5	1948–1971	1400–1423		Vulcan Iron Works	0-6-2T	"Turkey", No 1422 is preserved at Haapamäki.

=== Steam locomotive references ===
Data from:

- Finnish Railway Museum official website
- Finnish website with locomotive technical data

== Electric multiple units ==
Image	Class	In service	Numbers
	VR Class Sm1	1969–2016	6001+6201 – 6050+6250
	VR Class Sm2	1975–present	6051+6251 – 6100+6300
	VR Class Sm3	1995–present	7x01–7x18
	VR Class Sm4	1999–present	6301+6401 – 6330+6430
	JKOY Class Sm5	2009–present	01–81
	VR Class Sm6	2010–2022; 2025–present	7x51–7x54
	VR Class Sm7	2026–present (planned)	

== Diesel multiple units ==
Image	Class	In service	Numbers
	VR Class Ds1	1928–1955	1, 4 and 5
	VR Class Dm1 & Dm2	1935–1961	13–19
	VR Class Dm3 & Dm4	1952–1971	1500–1509 (Dm3); 1600–1623 (Dm4) (Note: The nine Dm3s were upgraded to Dm4s number 1614–1623 between 1956 and 1958.)
	VR Class Dm6 & Dm7	1954–1988	4000–4014 (Dm6); 4020–4216 (Dm7)
	VR Class Dm8	1964–1986	5001–5012
	VR Class Dm9	1965–1990	5101–5124
	VR Class Dm10	1994–1997	4301
	VR Class Dm11	1997	4401–4406 (Note: The numbers of the Dm11 class were reused on Dm12 class units.)
	VR Class Dm12	2005–present	4401–4416

== See also ==
- Finnish Railway Museum
- Hanko–Hyvinkää railway
- History of rail transport in Finland
- Jokioinen Museum Railway

== Literature ==
- Alameri, Mikko (1979). Suomen rautatiet (in Finnish and German). Verlag Josef Otto Slezak. ISBN 3-900134-52-9.
- Eonsuu, Tapio; Honkanen, Pekka; Kilpinen, Tapani; Pölhö, Eljas (1975). Suomen veturit 1 osa. Valtionrautateiden höyryveturit. Frank Stenvalls Förlag. ISBN 91-7266-021-X.
- Eonsuu, Tapio; Honkanen, Pekka; Pölhö, Eljas (1995). Suomen veturit osa 2. Moottorikalusto. Elokuvan Maailma. ISBN 952-5060-02-0.
- Pölhö, Eljas; Honkanen, Pekka (2017). Höyryveturit valtionrautateillä - The Steam Locomotives of the Finnish State Railways. Finnish Railway History Society. ISBN 9789529390663.
