= VR Class Vr3 =

Class of Finnish steam locomotives

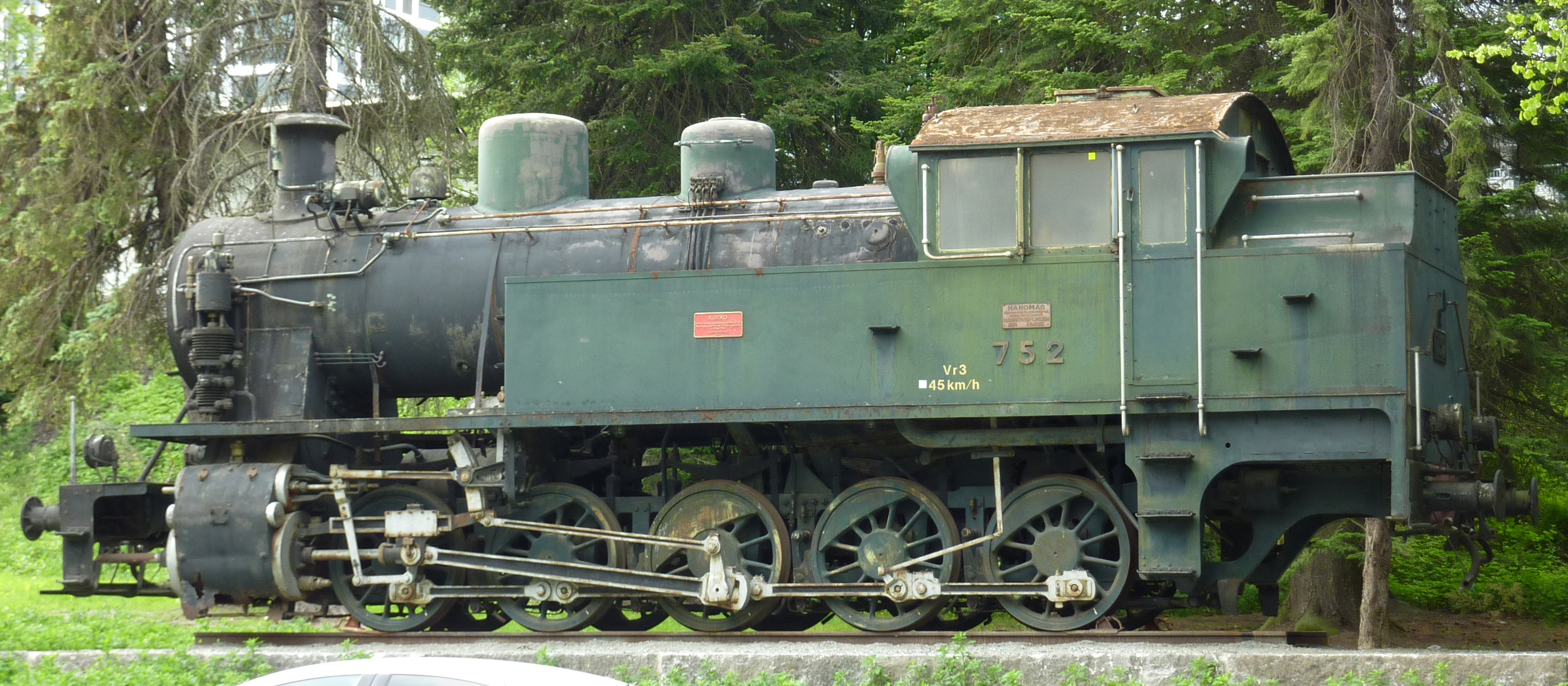
- No. 752 on display outside Kuopio railway station
Type and origin
- Power type: Steam
- Builder: Hanomag, Tampella
- Build date: 1924–
- Total produced: 5
Specifications
- Configuration
  - Whyte: 0-10-0T
- Gauge: 1,524 mm (5 ft)
- Length: 12.83 m (42 ft 1 in)
- Loco weight: 77.9 tonnes (76.7 long tons; 85.9 short tons)
- Fuel type: Coal or firewood
- Fuel capacity: 4 t (3.9 long tons; 4.4 short tons)
- Water cap.: 6 cubic metres (210 cu ft)
- Firebox
  - Grate area: 2.11 m^{2} (22.7 sq ft)
- Heating surface: 122 m^{2} (1,310 sq ft)
Performance figures
- Maximum speed: 45 km/h (28 mph)
Career
- Numbers: 752–756
- Nicknames: “Rooster” / "Cockerel"
- First run: 1924
- Withdrawn: 1975
- Disposition: 752 Kuopio, 753 Haapamäki, 755 Hyvinkää

The VR Class Vr3 was a class of steam locomotive built in Finland. Before 1942, the class was known as O1. They were nicknamed Kukko ("Rooster" or "Cockerel") and they have the same frames and boiler as the Vr Class Pr1 (Paikku) locomotive. The first locomotive was ordered in 1924 from Hanomag of Germany, number 10 351 and it was numbered 752. The remaining 4 were produced by Tampella Oy in Tampere. They were numbered 752 to 756.

The VR3 was the largest and most powerful Finnish locomotive of its time. It was a success, but in the hands of inexperienced drivers, it could all too easily damage buffers or break couplings. Therefore, a screw-drive regulator was fitted. At speed there could be longitudinal movement because the locomotive had no bogie wheels, only 5 rigid axles. However, the "Rooster" was generally considered to be a fine locomotive. Some say the name resulted from the slightly louder than a normal whistle. They were deliberately designed to work within very large rail yards, where the overall noise level could be very high. For half a century, the chirpy crow of the "Rooster" was a familiar sound in Finnish marshalling yards. They proved to be agile and could easily scale the humps and complex pointwork of marshaling yards where their great power compensated for their low speed. They were in use until 1975.

== See also ==
- Finnish Railway Museum
- VR Group
- List of Finnish locomotives
- Jokioinen Museum Railway
- History of rail transport in Finland
- VR Class Pr1
- VR Class Hr1
- VR Class Tk3
