= PR1 =

PR1 or PR-1 may refer to:

- Polskie Radio Program I, a radio channel broadcast by the Polish public broadcaster Polskie Radio
- the first group of plant pathogenesis-related proteins
- the first of three categories of para-rowing, also known as adaptive rowing
- VR Class Pr1, a Finnish locomotive
- Puerto Rico Highway 1, a road connecting the city of Ponce to San Juan
