= Lokomo =

Oy Lokomo Ab was a Finnish manufacturer of railroad equipment and steam locomotives, situated in Tampere, Finland. The company was founded in 1915 by a group of Finnish businesspeople, including Jalmar Castrén and Emil Aaltonen. The Lokomo factories in Tampere produced the MIR submersibles for the Soviet Academy of Sciences. They later merged into the Metso Corporation. Jaakko Syrjä was a worker for the company.

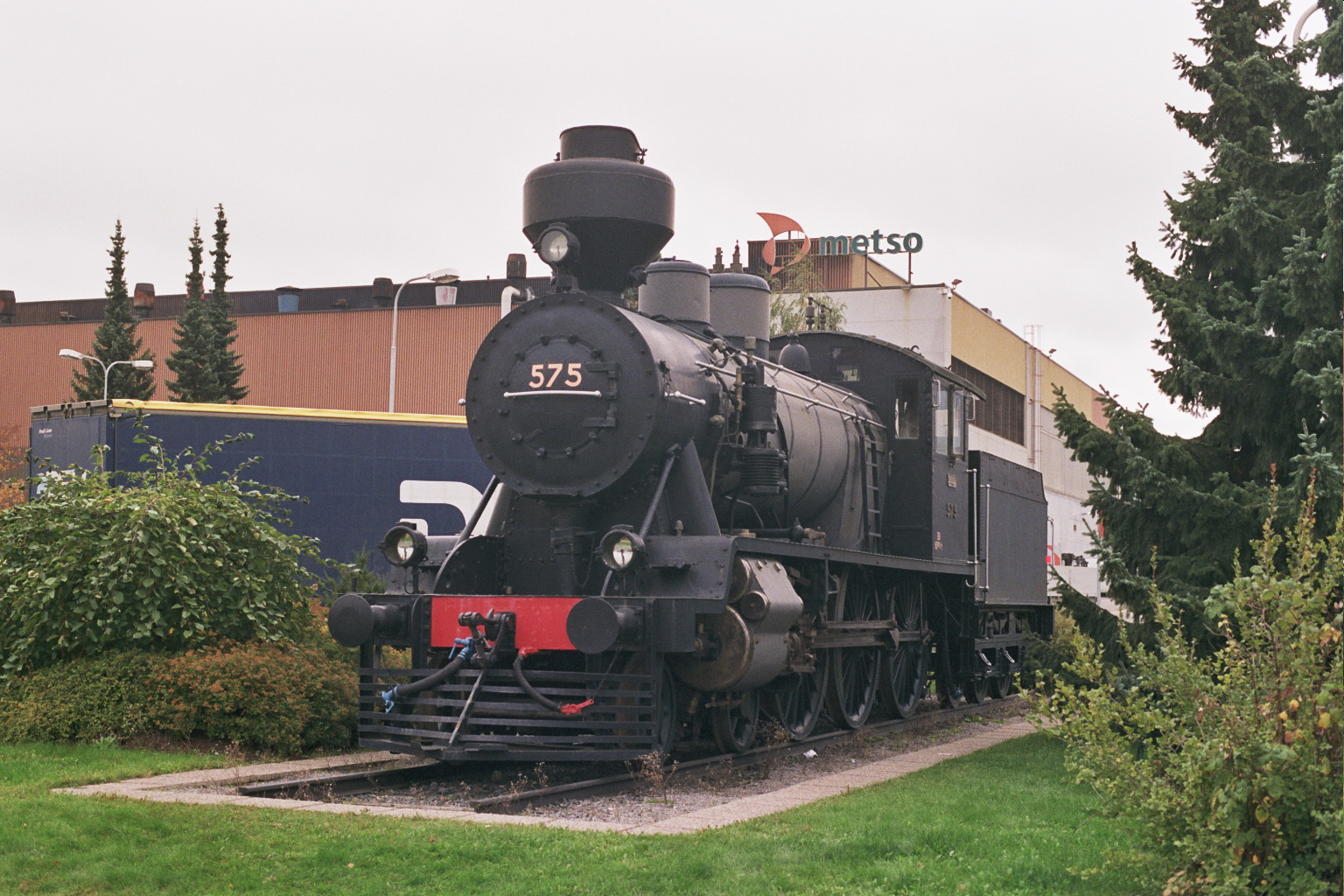
VR Class Hv1 575, preserved in front of Metso Lokomo Steels in Hatanpää, Tampere, Finland. This was the first locomotive manufactured by Lokomo and entered service in 1920

== See also ==
- Finnish Railway Museum
- VR Group
- List of Finnish locomotives
- Jokioinen Museum Railway
- List of railway museums Worldwide
- Heritage railways
- List of heritage railways
- Restored trains
- Hanko–Hyvinkää railway
- History of rail transport in Finland
- VR Class Pr1
- VR Class Hr1
- VR Class Tr1
- VR Class Tk3
- VR Class Hr11
