= VR Class Dm10 =

Prototypical Finnish diesel multiple unit

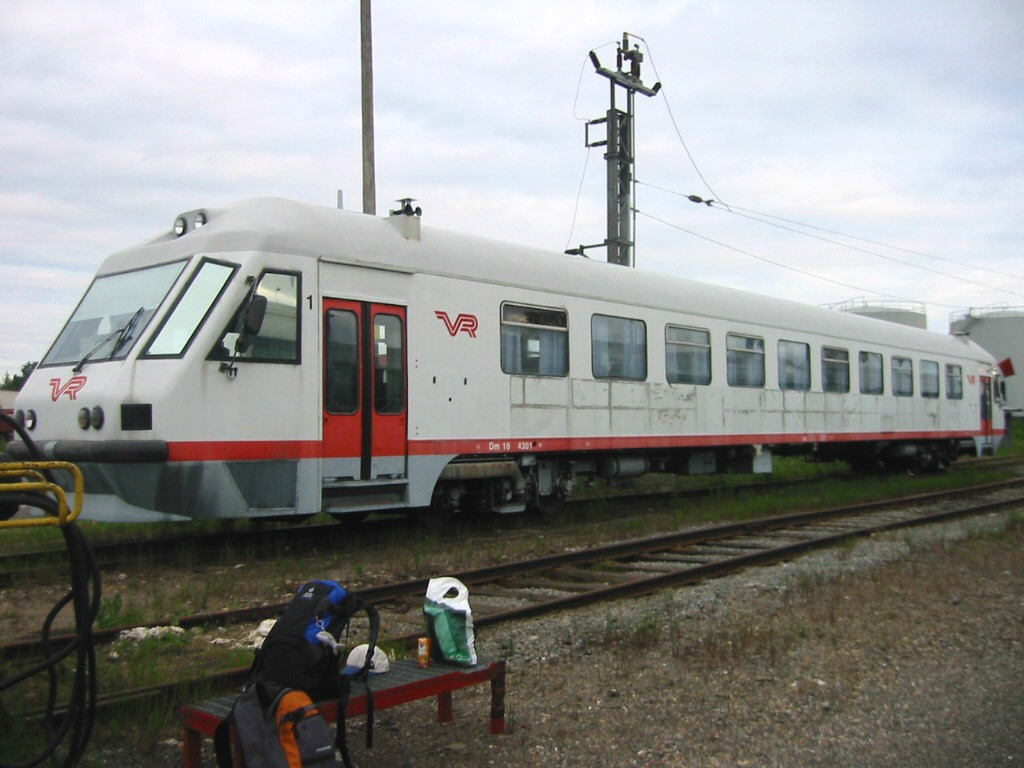
- The only train of its class, Dm10 4301, awaiting scrapping at Joensuu in 2005.
- In service: 1994–1997
- Manufacturer: VR Group
- Built at: Pieksämäki workshop
- Scrapped: 2006
- Number built: 1
- Number in service: 0
- Number scrapped: 1
- Formation: 1 car
- Fleet numbers: 4301
- Capacity: 80
- Operators: VR Group
- Lines served: Parikkala–Savonlinna, Iisalmi–Ylivieska

Specifications
- Car length: 31,150 mm (102 ft 2 in)
- Width: 3,000 mm (9 ft 10 in)
- Height: 4,500 mm (14 ft 9 in)
- Doors: 2 + 2
- Maximum speed: 100 km/h (62 mph)
- Weight: 53 t (52 long tons; 58 short tons)
- Prime mover(s): Volvo THD 100A
- Engine type: Diesel engine
- Power output: 2 × 157 kW (211 hp)
- Transmission: Wilson
- Track gauge: 1,524 mm (5 ft)

The Dm10 was an experimental diesel multiple unit built by VR Group's Pieksämäki workshop in 1994. It was based on a blue passenger carriage, Eit 23018, which was fitted with two diesel engines taken from HKL buses 601 and 608. The train had 80 no-smoking seats and had the driver selling tickets, which was unusual for Finnish conditions. During testing, it was run under the nomenclature KOEMV 9991 (from the Finnish koemoottorivaunu, experimental multiple unit), transporting Finnish President Martti Ahtisaari in Savonia in May 1994.

First accounts were positive, citing that the ride was silent and comfortable. During the summer of 1995 the Dm10 was branded Ilja Repin Express. It was used as an art train, bringing customers to an exhibition of Repin's art at Retretti Art Centre from Punkaharju and Savonlinna. It was also driven on select Saturdays to Rantasalmi.

The unit was finally used in regular service for only three years, 1994 to 1997, mostly in regional traffic in Eastern Finland before being withdrawn. The train had problems with its brakes and VR expected it to be cheaper to buy new DMUs instead of converting old carriages for an expected service time of only 15 years. The train was scrapped in 2006 by Kuusakoski Oy.

The nickname of the Dm10 is Junttilan Salama (Finnish for "Redneck land lightning").
