= VR Class Tk3 =

Class of Finnish steam locomotives

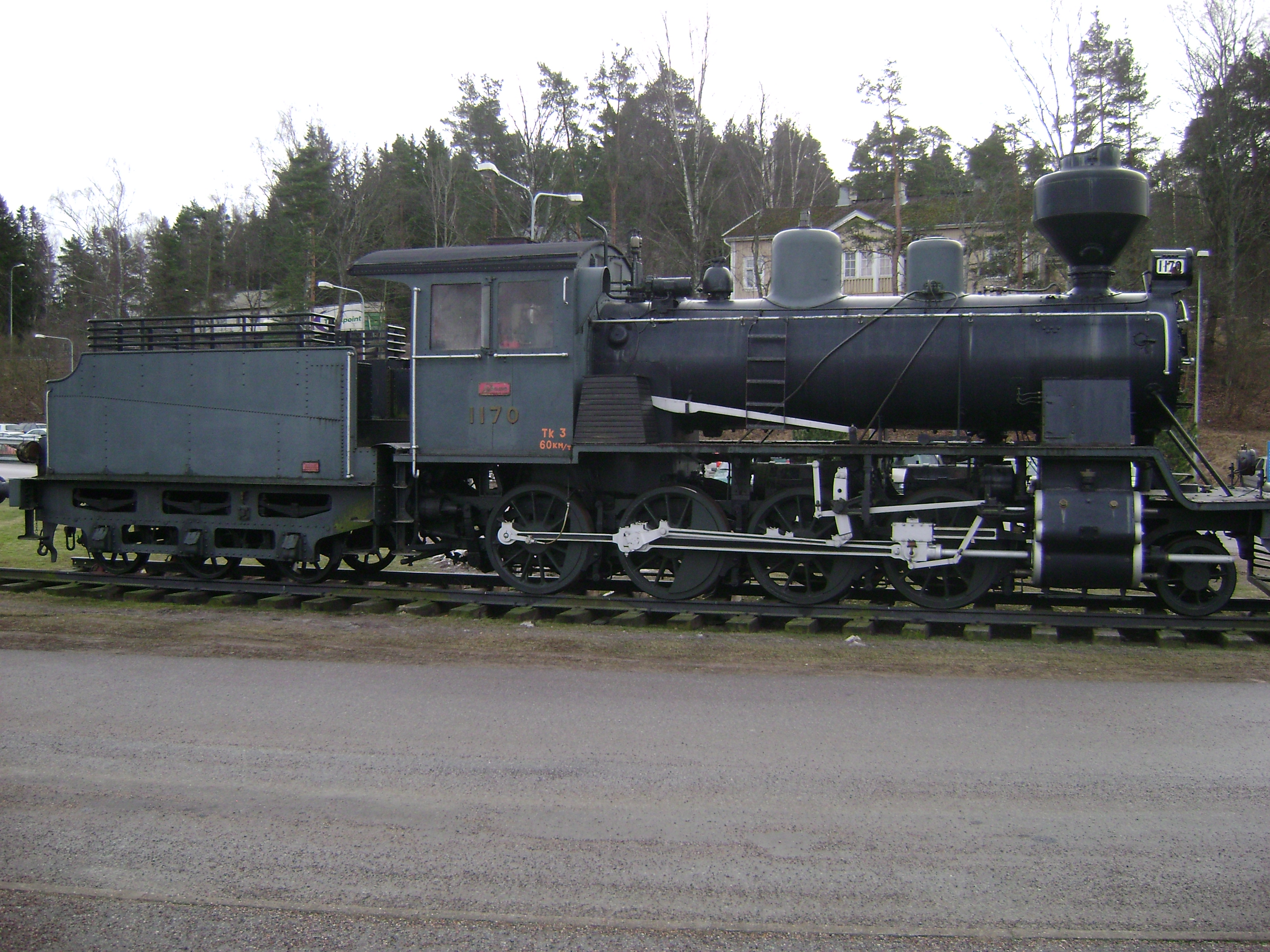
- Tk3 with wood chimney
Type and origin
- Power type: Steam
- Builder: Tampella, Lokomo and Frichs
- Build date: 1927–53
- Total produced: 161
Specifications
- Configuration
  - AAR: 2-8-0
- Gauge: 1,524 mm (5 ft)
- Driver dia.: 1,270 mm (4 ft 2 in)
- Length: 16 m (52 ft 6 in)
- Loco weight: 51.8 tonnes (51.0 long tons; 57.1 short tons)
- Boiler pressure: 14 bar (1,400 kPa; 200 psi)
- Cylinders: Two, outside
- Valve gear: Walschaerts
Performance figures
- Maximum speed: 60 km/h (37 mph)
- Tractive effort: 94 kN (21,130 lbf)
Career
- Operators: VR
- First run: 1927
- Withdrawn: 1975
- Disposition: 38 preserved, remainder scrapped

The Finnish VR Class Tk3 (original classification 'K5') is a 2-8-0 light freight locomotive. It was the most numerous steam locomotive class in Finland with 161 built. One hundred locomotives were constructed between 1927 and 1930, with a further 61 ordered and constructed 1943–53. They were numbered 800–899, 1100–1118, and 1129–1170.

They were designed for a low axle load of just 10.7 tonnes (10.5 long tons; 11.8 short tons). This allowed them to operate on lightly laid secondary lines, but during their many years of service, up to the end of the steam era, they were also widely used on main lines hauling slow passenger trains that made frequent stops.

They were affectionately called "Pikku-Jumbo" (The Little Jumbo) because of their good performance despite their low weight. They had low fuel consumption (usually Tk3s used birch wood) and good riding characteristics. They also had good steaming characteristics and were very popular among locomotive crews.

The livery of the Tk3 was the same as other VR steam locomotives: dark locomotive green with a black smokebox. When new, some locos were lined with thin gold decoration. The gold decorations were not repainted during maintenance, so they were seldom seen.

Two Tk3-type engines were originally supplied by Tampella to Rauma Rautatie as Nos. 9 and 10 (ex-No. 8) in 1935 and 1927, respectively. These engines became Tk3 1117 and 1118 after the private railway was absorbed by the State network in 1950.

== Preservation ==
Thirty-eight members of the class have been preserved:

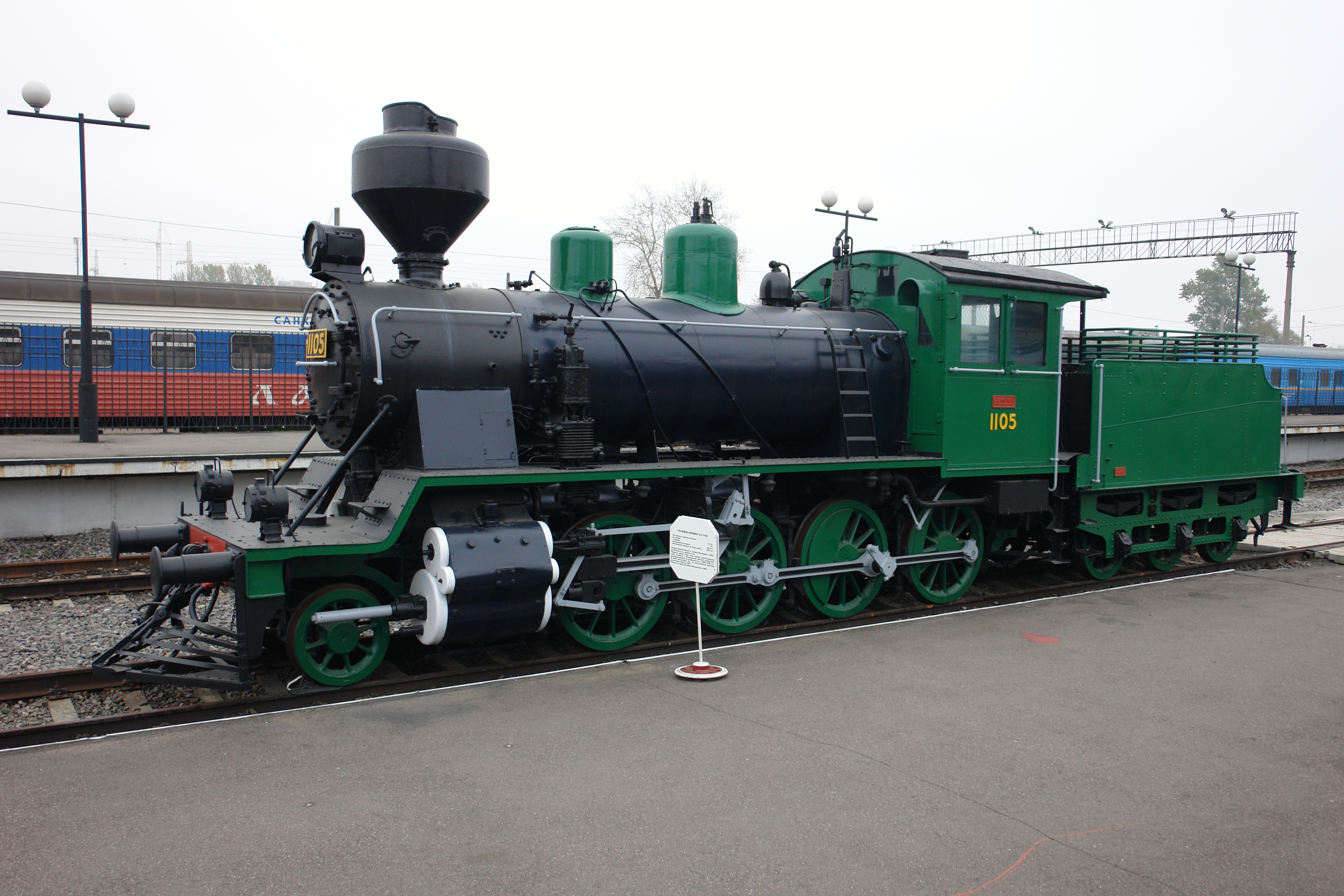
Tk3 1105 at Varshavsky Rail Terminal Museum, St.Petersburg, Russia

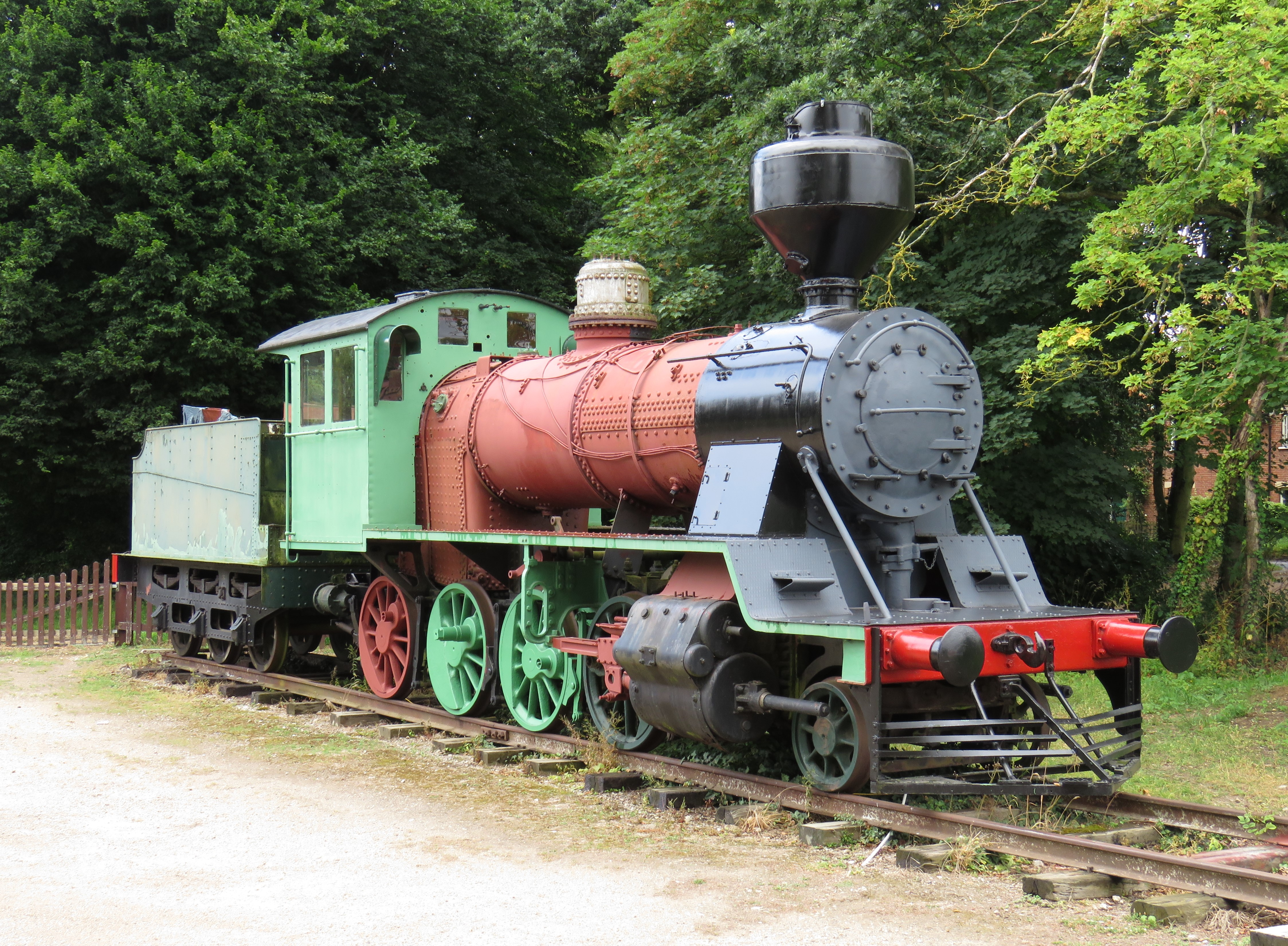
Tk3 1144 at Bressingham Steam and Gardens

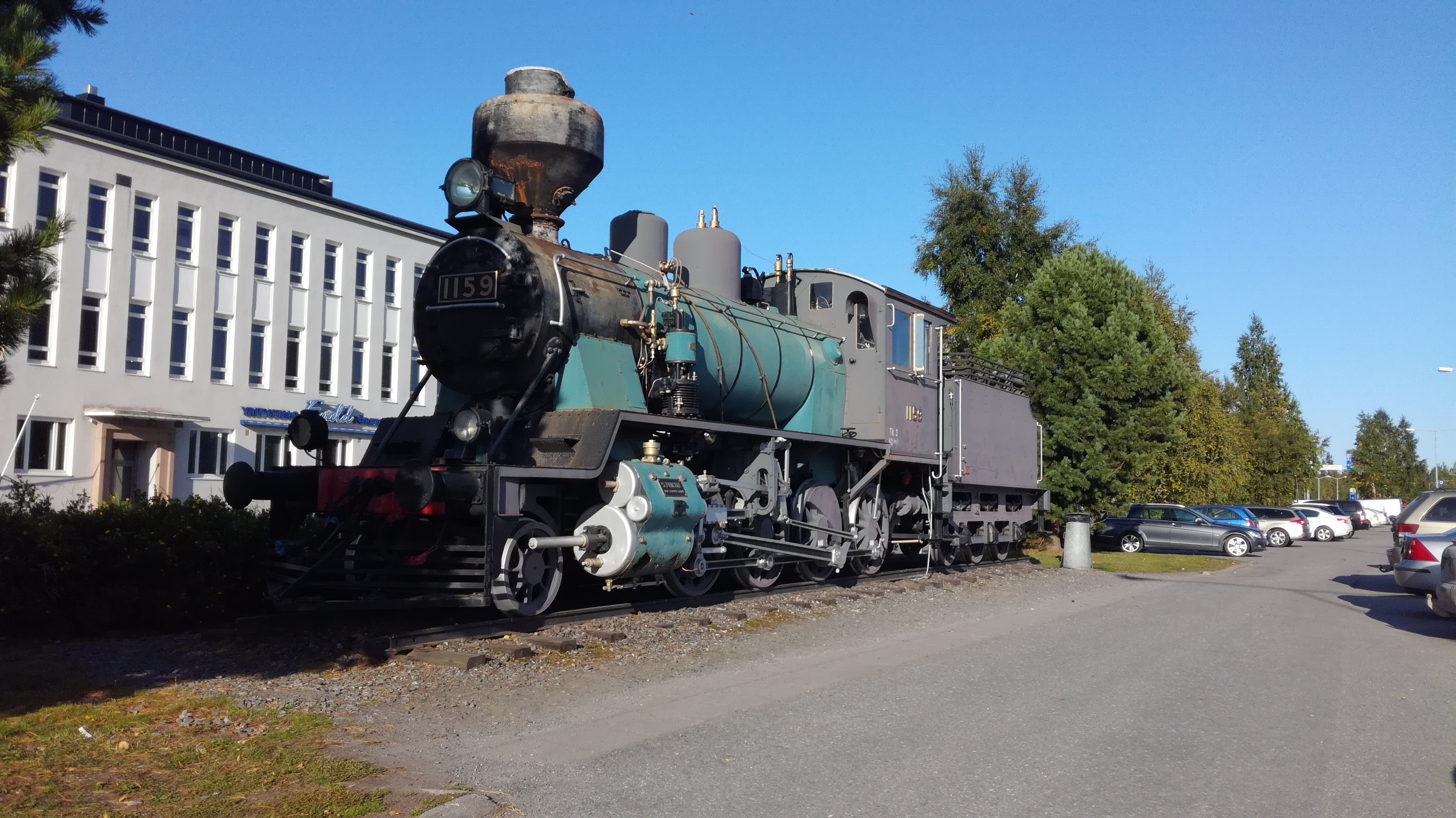
Tk3 1159 in Kokkola

- 852 Pieksämäki
- 859 Kouvola railway station, Kouvola
- 1100
- 1103 Retallack Leisure Centre & Holiday Park, Cornwall, UK.
- 1104 Haapamäki
- 1105 Russian Railway Museum, Baltiysky railway station, St.Petersburg
- 1106 Parola
- 1108 Turku
- 1110
- 1111 Haapamäki
- 1112 Vaala
- 1129
- 1130 Haapamäki
- 1132 Porvoo
- 1134 Acton, Suffolk, England
- 1135 Haapamäki
- 1136 Haapamäki
- 1137
- 1138 Suolahti
- 1139 Haapamäki
- 1140 Tampere
- 1141
- 1142 Haapamäki
- 1144 Bressingham Steam and Gardens, England
- 1146 Haapamäki
- 1147 Rovaniemi
- 1148 Rovaniemi
- 1150 Suolahti
- 1151 England
- 1152 Ämmänsaari, Suomussalmi
- 1154 Commercial center Veturi, Kouvola, Tk3
- 1157 Acton, Suffolk, England
- 1159 Kokkola
- 1163 Pasila
- 1165 Seinäjoki
- 1167 Rauma, Finland
- 1168 Porvoo
- 1170 Karis

== See also ==
- Finnish Railway Museum
- History of rail transport in Finland
- Heritage railways
- Jokioinen Museum Railway
- List of Finnish locomotives
- List of heritage railways
- List of railway museums
- Restored trains
- VR Class Pr1
- VR Class Hr1
- VR Class Hr11
- VR Group

== Literature ==
Valtionrautatiet 1937-1962, Helsinki 1962
