= VR Class Pr1 =

Class of 16 Finnish 2-8-2T locomotives

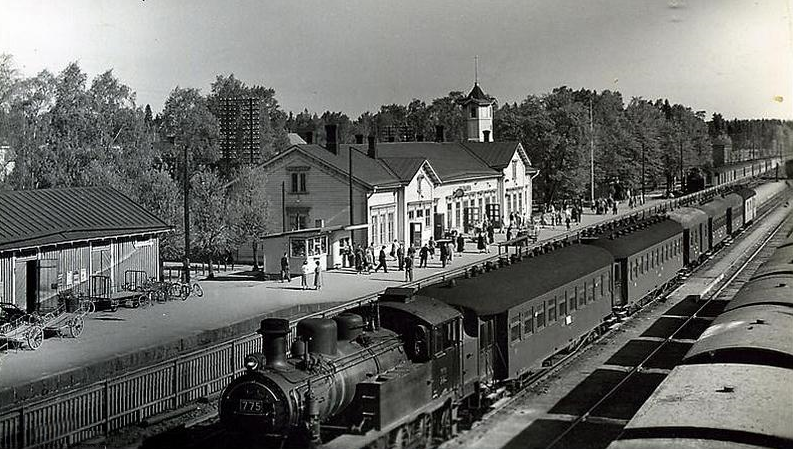
- Pr1 775 at Kerava station
Type and origin
- Power type: Steam
- Builder: Hanomag, Lokomo Oy and Tampella Oy
- Build date: 1924–1926
- Total produced: 16
Specifications
- Configuration
  - AAR: 2-8-2T
- Gauge: 1,524 mm (5 ft)
- Driver dia.: 1,600 mm (5 ft 3 in)
- Trailing dia.: 960 mm (3 ft 2 in)
- Length: 13.25 m (43 ft 6 in)
- Loco weight: 88.2 tonnes (86.8 long tons; 97.2 short tons)
- Fuel type: coal
- Fuel capacity: 4 tonnes (3.9 long tons; 4.4 short tons)
- Cylinders: Two, outside
Performance figures
- Maximum speed: 80 km/h (50 mph)
Career
- Operators: VR
- Numbers: 761–776
- First run: 1924
- Withdrawn: 1972
- Disposition: one restored, others scrapped

VR Class Pr1 (original classification N1, nickname Paikku, from Finnish “paikallinen”, local) was a tank steam locomotive for local passenger services of Finnish railways.

== Ordering and delivery ==
In the 1920s, VR was concerned about the low power and speed of their existing class Vk1-3 class locomotives that were used in local services, especially on the Helsinki commuter rail services. A decision was reached to order a new and powerful, by standards of that time, local traffic locomotive from Hanomag with the intention of licence manufacture of more units by Finnish locomotive works.

At the same time, a shunting locomotive based on a similar design, Vr3, was also ordered. The classes share many parts, including as frames, boilers and spaces for coal, but wheel arrangement, domes and top speed are very different because of their completely different roles. The locomotive was of tank design with small coal bunker in the rear, which limited operational range.

The first batch of six locomotives was delivered in 1924 by Hanomag. Later examples were manufactured in Finland with the last being delivered in 1926.

== Operational history ==
The class was placed on Helsinki local services immediately after delivery. They were especially designed for this; since Helsinki was and is a dead-end terminus with no turntables, Pr1's were designed so that they could be run in both directions without turning the locomotive. Both ends had cowcatchers and normal lights. As well, the speed limit was 80 km/h in both directions. Generally Pr1's were run with their front boiler end pointing at Helsinki central railway station. Pr1's pulled mostly local wooden-carriage passenger trains, but they also performed shunting duties at Helsinki harbours and pulled local freight. The Pr1 was considered to have a high tractive effort and good acceleration. Pr1's were among the rare locomotive types in Finland which were for some time oil-burning at the end of 1940s. Otherwise these locomotives were both coal and wood-burners.

== End of operations and preservation ==
The era of Pr1's in passenger services came to an end in the 1960s with dieselization. The last passenger service run was in 1968. The locomotives were relegated to secondary freight duties, such gravel trains, and some were moved to depots other than from Pasila. All of the locomotives were withdrawn by 1972. Only one member of the class was preserved. No. 776 was repaired for 125th anniversary of VR in 1987 for use on heritage passenger trains. The boiler time expired in late 1990s. 776 is now on display at Finnish Railway Museum, but it is not in running condition.

== See also ==
- Finnish Railway Museum
- Heritage railways
- History of rail transport in Finland
- List of Finnish locomotives
- List of heritage railways
- List of railway museums
- Jokioinen Museum Railway
- Restored trains
- VR Class Hr1
- VR Class Tk3
- VR Class Hr11
- VR Group
