= VR Class Hr11 =

Class of Finnish diesel-hydraulic locomotives

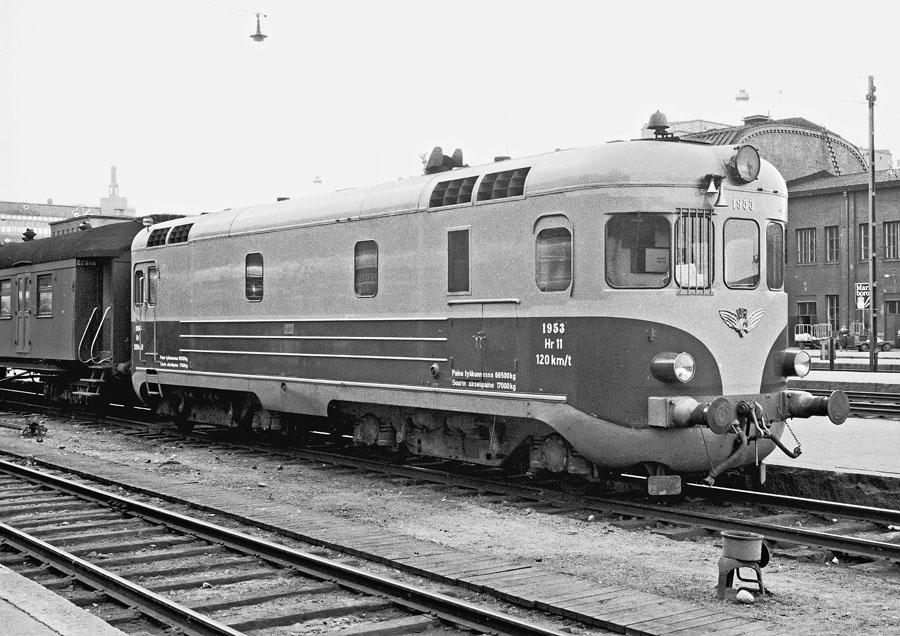
- Hr11 number 1953 at Helsinki railway station in 1965.
Type and origin
- Power type: Diesel-hydraulic
- Builder: Valmet Oy
- Build date: 1955
- Total produced: 5
Specifications
- Configuration
  - AAR: B-B
  - UIC: B′B′
- Gauge: 1,524 mm (5 ft)
- Wheel diameter: 960 mm (3 ft 2 in)
- Length: 15.4 m (50 ft 6 in)
- Loco weight: 66.5 tonnes (65.4 long tons; 73.3 short tons)
- Transmission: Mekydro hydraulic-mechanical
Performance figures
- Maximum speed: 120 km/h (75 mph)
- Power output: 2 × 600 hp (450 kW)
Career
- Operators: VR
- First run: 1955
- Withdrawn: 1972
- Disposition: No 1950 preserved at the Finnish Railway Museum, others scrapped

The VR Class Hr11 was the first class of line-haul diesel locomotives used by Valtionrautatiet (Finnish State Railways). Only five units were built, all delivered by Valmet in 1955. The Maybach diesel engines used in the locomotives proved highly unreliable, resulting in a complete overhaul of the engine-transmission system in 1956–58, but this did not solve all of the reliability problems. The Hr11 series was withdrawn from service in 1972.

== History ==
VR (Finnish Railways) started a modernization project in the early fifties. VR had a small amount of diesel and gasoline-powered railcars since the 1920s, but in 1952 VR had only steam locomotives.

Modern aluminum-carriage diesel powered express multiple units (Dm3 and Dm4) were introduced in 1952. Related to these orders, VR ordered in 1952 five passenger train diesel locomotives with hydraulic transmission from Valmet Oy, Tampere. The locomotives were delivered in 1955.

== Technology ==
The locomotives had originally two six-cylinder Maybach MD320 diesel engines driving each their own Maybach Mekydro K64B hydraulic-mechanical gearbox. The engines and transmission were placed in the bogies. The engine-transmission units proved to be very unreliable, and in 1956–58 a complete overhaul was done. Among other improvements, the engines were fitted with turbochargers, which increased the power from 450 hp to 600 hp, but simultaneously lowered the RPM from 1700 to 1500 r/min. The new engine designation was Maybach MD325. The gearboxes were changed to another type, Mekydro KL64. After the upgrade, the engines were reasonably reliable, but the reliability of the Maybach Mekydros did not improve significantly.

== Operation ==
The locomotives carried a gray livery, with wine-red broad stripes. The gray color and sleek looks earned it the nickname Lentävä susi (Flying Wolf). They pulled mainly passenger trains between Tampere, Helsinki and Turku. All units were abandoned in 1972.

== Preservation ==
No 1950 is stored at the Finnish Railway Museum.

== See also ==
- Finnish Railway Museum
- VR Group
- List of Finnish locomotives
- List of railway museums Worldwide
- Heritage railways
- List of heritage railways
- Restored trains
- Jokioinen Museum Railway
- History of rail transport in Finland
