= Haapamäki =

Village in Keuruu, Finland

Coordinates: 62°15′N 024°27′E

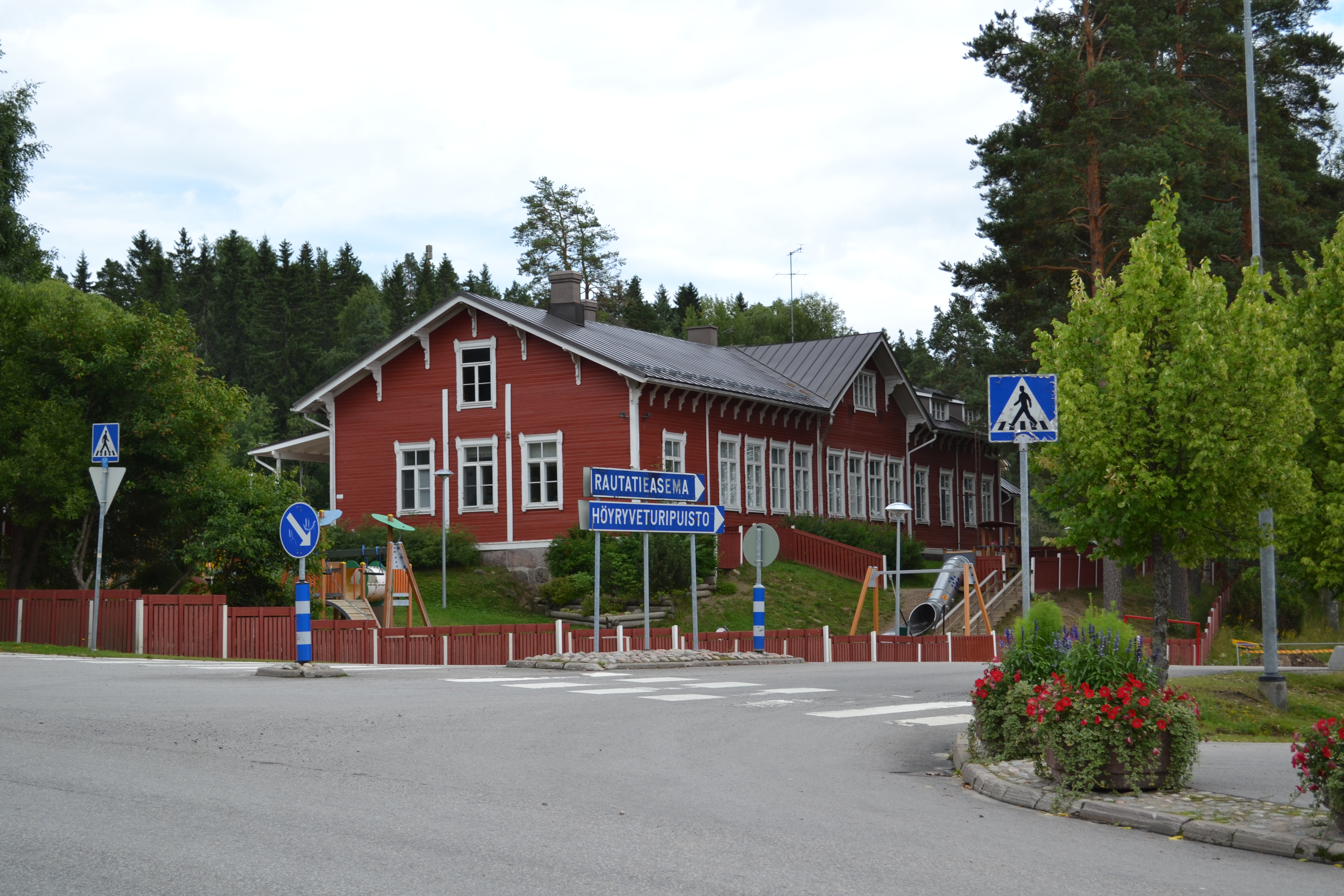
Intersection of Pihlajavedentie (connecting road 3481) and Asematie (connecting road 6041) in the center of the village

Haapamäki is a village in the municipality of Keuruu, Finland. It has historically been an important meeting point of major railway lines, which converge at Haapamäki railway station. It is 16 kilometres (9.9 mi) from Haapamäki to the center of Keuruu and 74 kilometres (46 mi) to the city of Jyväskylä. According to Statistics Finland, Haapamäki has 857 inhabitants (December 31, 2016), while according to the town of Keuruu, the population of the Haapamäki village area is about 1,500.

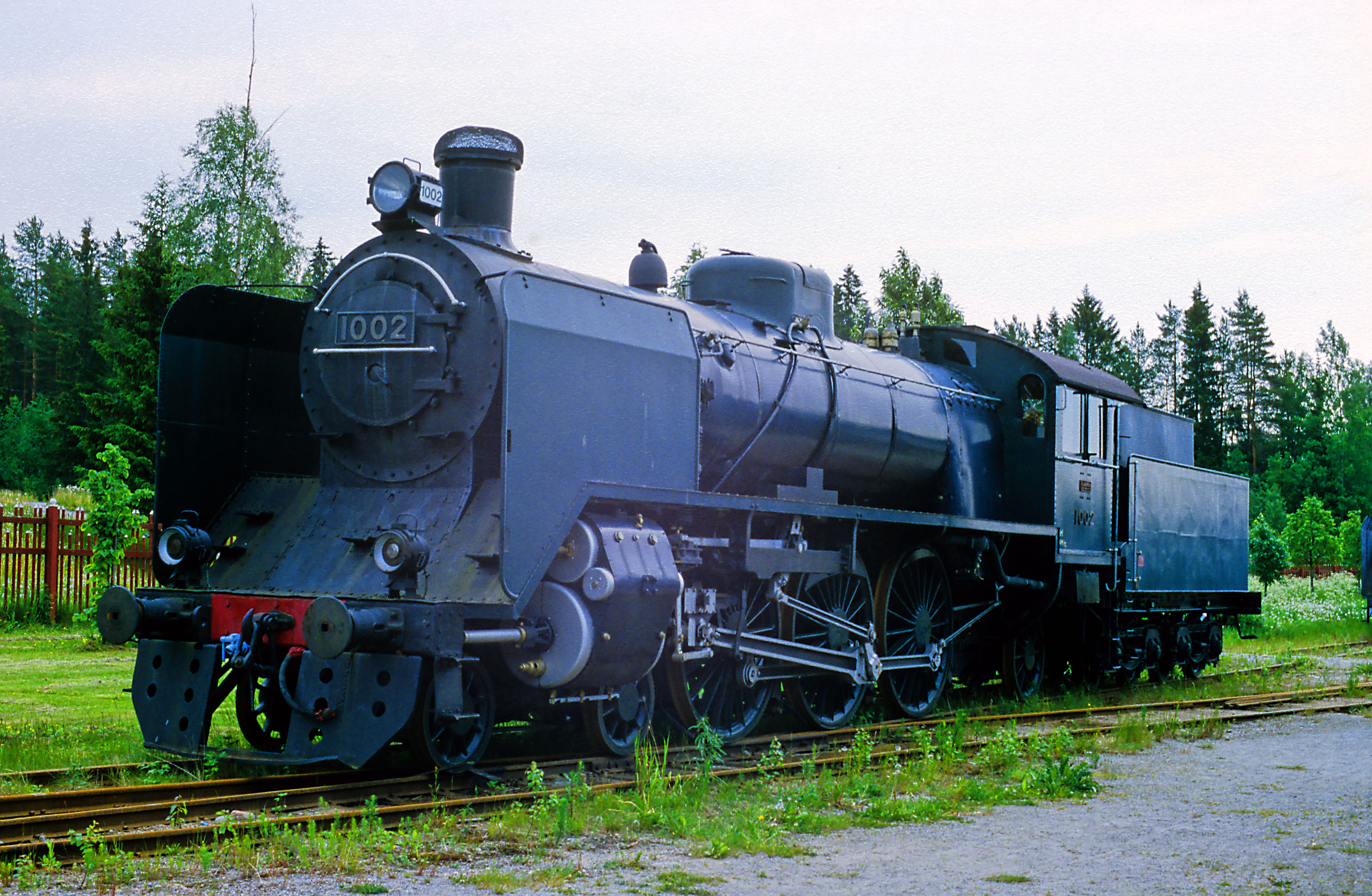
VR Class Hr1 1002 at Haapamaki

In Haapamäki, the basic services are: bank, pharmacy, grocery store, car repair shop, café, veterinarian, barber and flea market. Haapamäki has two small lakes, Lake Petäisjärvi and Lake Niemelänjärvi, as well as a few ponds. Haapamäki also has opportunities for fishing and snowmobile safaris.
