= Jänhijoki railway bridge =

Bridge in Finland

Coordinates: 60°51′32″N 23°26′21″E

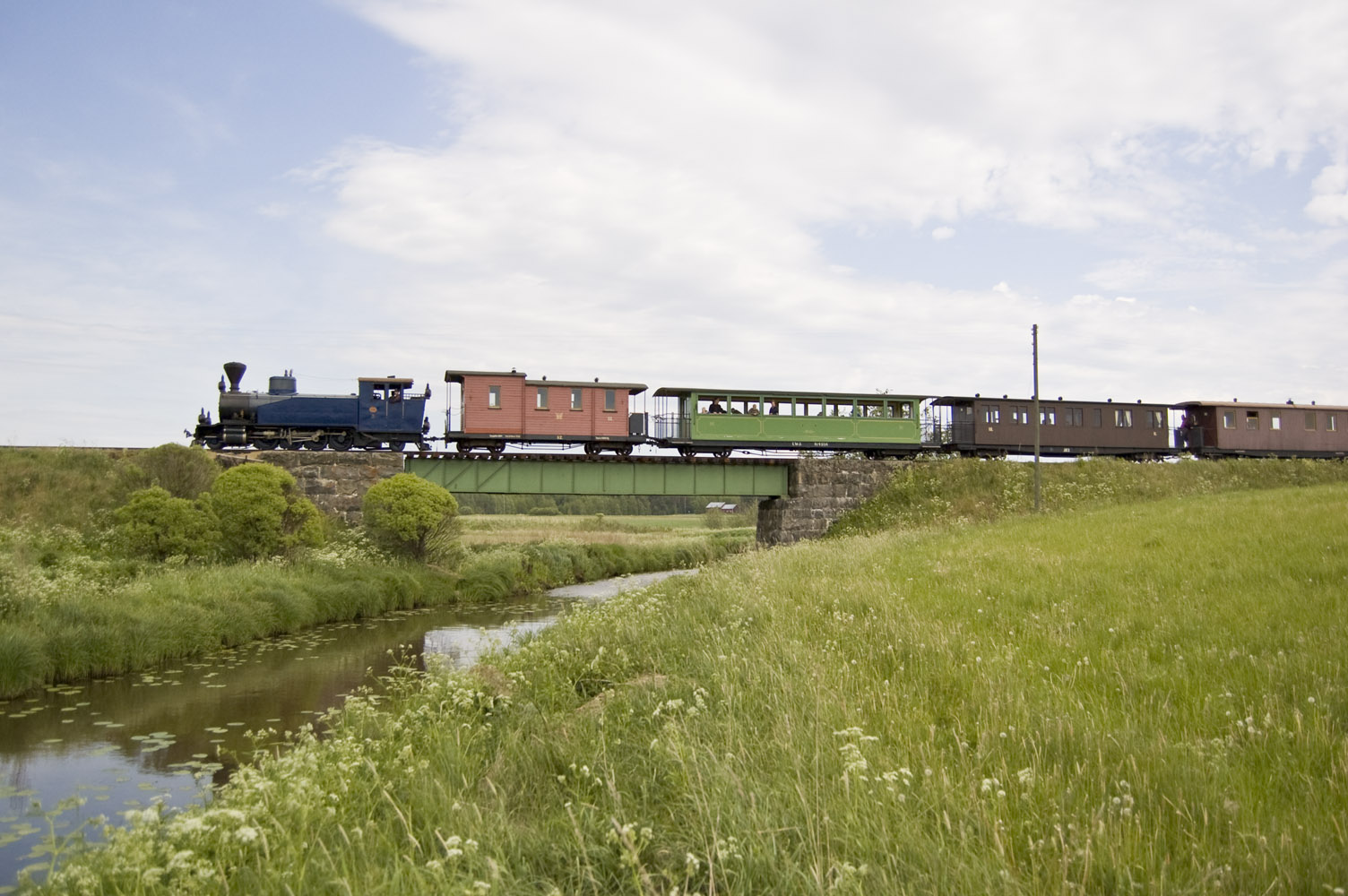

Jänhijoki railway bridge is a railway bridge in the village of Minkiö railway station in Jokioinen municipality, in the Kanta-Häme region of Finland. The bridge crosses the Jänhijoki river approximately 0.5 kilometres (0.3 mi) south of Minkiö railway station on the narrow gauge Jokioinen Museum Railway.

The bridge is the oldest railway bridge in Finland still in railway use. It was taken in service in 1898, when the original narrow gauge Jokioinen Railway was built to connect Humppila with Jokioinen and Forssa. When the narrow gauge railway was discontinued, the bridge was to be demolished and the tracks were to be lifted. The volunteers of museum railway placed a steam locomotive on the bridge to prevent the bridge being scrapped. Finally a six-kilometer (4 mi) long section of railway, including the bridge, was purchased from its previous owners and preserved as a museum railway.

The bridge measures 16.2 metres (53 ft 2 in) long. When built in 1897–1898 a total of 96 wooden poles, each 20 metres (66 ft) long, were driven into the clay terrain to inforce the foundation. The bridge abutments are stone masonry—the bridge having only one span measuring 15.6 metres (51 ft 2 in) between the main bearings on each bank. The steelwork for the bridge was supplied by Harkort AG from Duisburg, Germany.

On April 24, 1918, during the height of the Finnish Civil War, there was an attempt to sabotage the bridge. An explosive charge was placed under the friction bearing at the north end of the bridge and detonated. The explosion caused some damage to the span, causing it to warp. The bridge was temporarily repaired, but complete repairs had to wait to be done until 1928.

== Sources ==
- Alameri, Mikko; Kalliomäki, Reino; Nummelin, Markku; Ojanperä, Kari (1998). Jokioisten rautatie, 100 vuotta liikenteelle avaamisesta (in Finnish). Museorautatieyhdistys ry.
