= Narrow-gauge railways in Finland =

Finnish rail below standard gauge

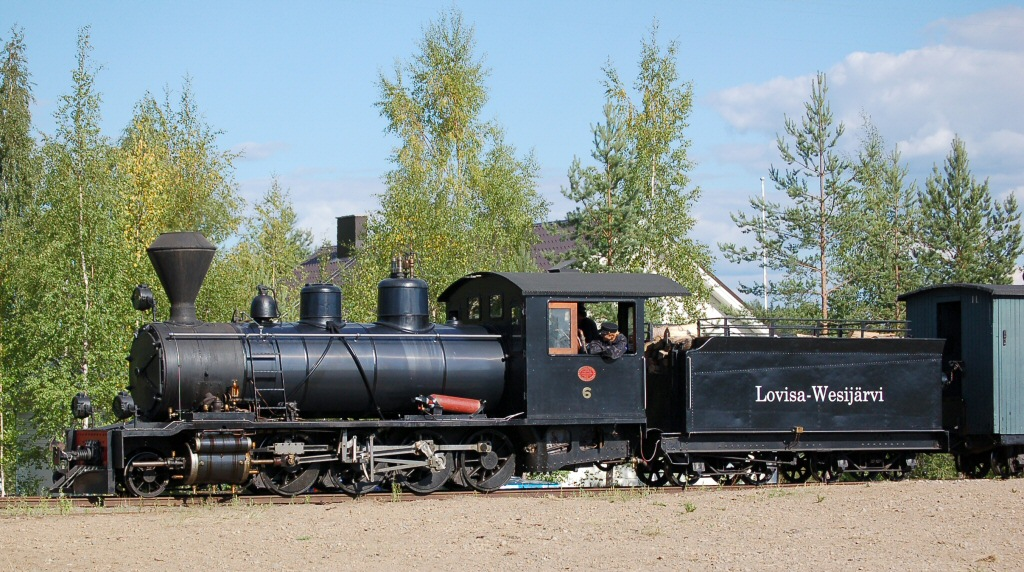
Lovisa–Wesijärvi Railway (LWR) 2-8-0 steam locomotive number 6 (built in 1909) in running order on the Jokioinen Museum Railway

The vast majority of Finnish narrow-gauge railways were owned and operated by private companies. There are only a few instances where narrow-gauge railways were in direct connection with each other, and those interchanges did not last for long. The railways never formed a regional rail traffic network, but were only focused on maintaining connections between the national Russian-gauge railway network and the off-line industries.

Some railways were closed due to competition from the roads, others were converted to 1,524 mm (5 ft) Russian gauge.

== Common carriers ==
- The Loviisa–Vesijärvi railway (1900–1960) operated an 80 km (50 mi) line between Lahti and Loviisa.
- The Hyvinkää–Karkkila railway operated a 46 km (29 mi) line between Hyvinkää and Karkkila
- The Jokioinen Railway operated a 23 km (14 mi) line until 1974, being the last common-carrier narrow-gauge railway in Finland.

Other lines were notably shorter. The common gauges were 600 mm (1 ft 11 5/8 in) and 750 mm (2 ft 5 1/2 in), with a few railways built with 785 mm (2 ft 6 29/32 in) and 1,000 mm (3 ft 3 3/8 in) gauges.

== Tourist and heritage lines ==
Narrow-gauge tourist and heritage lines of 600 mm (1 ft 11 5/8 in) gauge and 750 mm (2 ft 5 1/2 in) narrow gauge still operate.

- Jokioinen Museum Railway, 750 mm (2 ft 5 1/2 in), 14 km, Jokioinen–Minkiö–Humppila.
- Nykarleby Jernväg, 600 mm (1 ft 11 5/8 in), 2 km.
- Tankavaara Kultakylä, 600 mm (1 ft 11 5/8 in), opened in 1997.
- Outokummun Kaivosrautatie, 750 mm (2 ft 5 1/2 in), 1.15 km, former copper mine.

== Other ==
- Rokua railway, 900 mm (2 ft 11 7/16 in), 3.3 km (2.1 mi), line connecting a hotel with a fitness center
