= Minkiö railway station =

Railway station in Finland

Minkiö
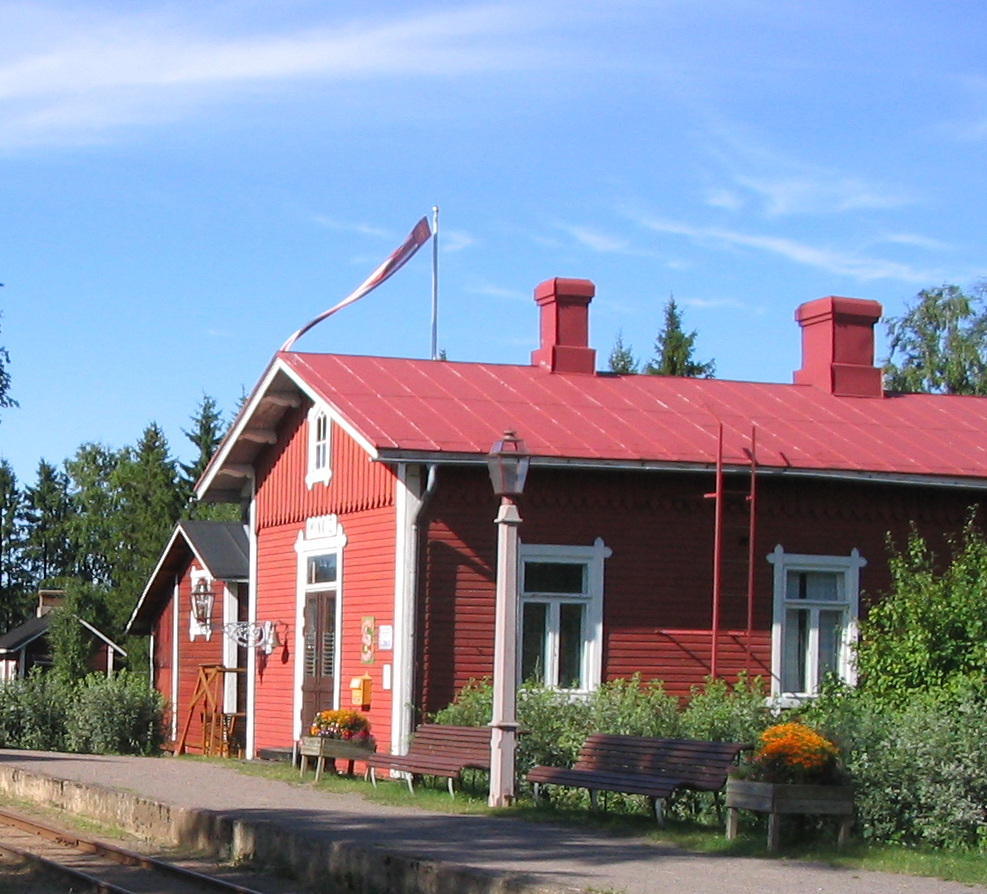

General information
- Location: Kiipuntie 49; 31630 Minkiö
- Coordinates: 60°51.766′N 23°26.277′E
- System: Heritage railway station
- Owner: Jokioinen Museum Railway
- Platforms: 2

History
- Opened: 1898
Route map
Location

Minkiö railway station (Finnish: Minkiön asema) is a neighborhood of the Kiipu village and a railway station at the Jokioinen Museum Railway, situated north of the Minkiö village on the northern shore of the river Jänhijoki, and on the western side of the Jänhijoki village in the municipality of Jokioinen. The neighborhood which developed around the railway station is located about eight kilometers from the center of Jokioinen and about eight kilometers from Humppila.

The station building of Minkiö (Miö) was built in 1898 when the Jokioinen Railway was constructed. The name of the station has always been Minkiö, even the actual village of Minkiö is located about 4 kilometres (2.5 mi) south of the station, near the present day Jokioinen railway station of the Jokioinen Museum Railway. Locals called the station "Kiipu platform" (Kiipun laituri). The station had daily passenger service in 1899–1951. However the ticket sales was only started in the mid 1930s.

In addition to the 1898 built and 1903 expanded station building (64 m^{2} or 690 sq ft), also a sauna and baking hut (23 m^{2} or 250 sq ft), shed and cattle shelter (43 m^{2} or 460 sq ft) and a goods shed (41 m^{2} or 440 sq ft) remain at the station area today.

Originally Minkiö was rated as a platform point and later on a station stop. The station was never an independent station and was always under control of a Jokioinen station master. The station was changed to unstaffed on 1 December 1962.

The station building saw random usage for ten years. In 1972 the Museum Railway Forssa - Humppila (Museorautatie Forssa - Humppila ry) rented the station when the museum train traffic was started. The goods shed remained in the use of Jokioinen Railway. In 1978 both buildings were bought by the Jokioinen Museum Railway together with other buildings of the station area.

At its largest the Minkiö yard had three tracks. The third track was built for goods loading in 1933 and was dismantled in 1966.

== Jokioinen Museum Railway ==
When the railway line from Minkiö to Jokioinen was bought from Jokioinen Railway the development of the museum's own Minkiö station started. A small countryside station grew to be the central depot of the museum railway. The railway yard has grown from two to fifteen tracks.
