= Oulujoki (municipality) =

Coordinates: 65.0072°N 25.5636°E

- Former municipality
- Oulujoen kunta Oulujoki kommun
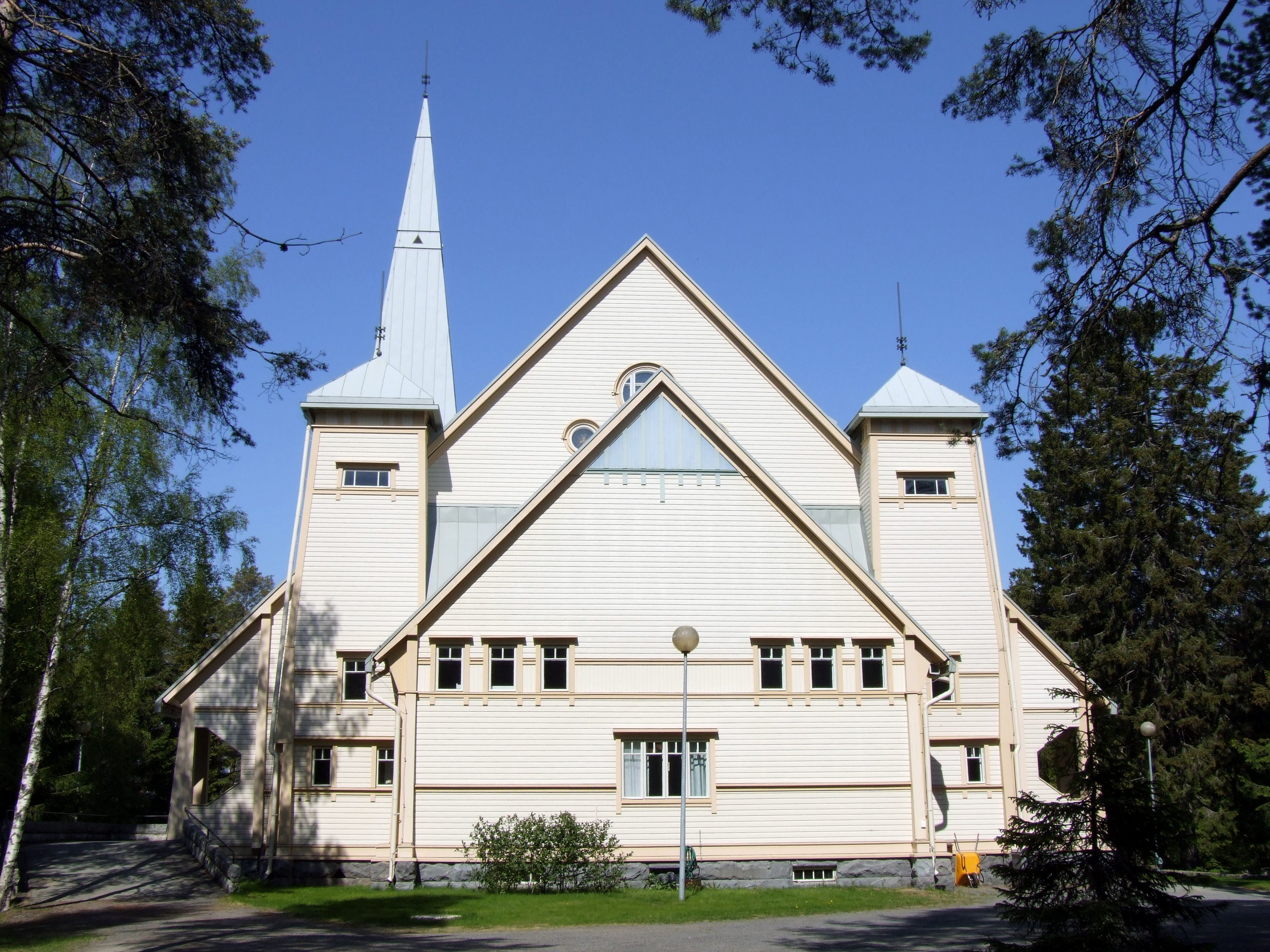
- Oulujoki Church, built in 1908

- Coat of arms

- Location of Oulujoki in the Oulu Province
- Country: Finland
- Province: Oulu Province
- Region: Northern Ostrobothnia
- Established: 1865
- Merged: 1965

Area
  - Land: 606.1 km^{2} (234.0 sq mi)

Population (1963)
  - Total: 5,230
  - Density: 8.63/km^{2} (22.3/sq mi)
- Time zone: UTC+2 (EET)
  - Summer (DST): UTC+3 (EEST)

Oulujoki (formerly Oulun maalaiskunta or Oulu Rural Municipality) is a former municipality of Finland. The municipality had a population of 5,230 (1963) and covered a land area of 606.1 square kilometres (234.0 sq mi). Its neighbouring municipalities were Kempele, Kiiminki, Muhos, Oulu, Tyrnävä, Utajärvi and Ylikiiminki. The municipality was named after the river Oulujoki.

The municipality of Oulujoki was dissolved in 1965, and its area was annexed to Haukipudas, Kempele, Kiiminki, Oulu, Oulunsalo, Tyrnävä, Utajärvi and Ylikiiminki. Upon the later municipal mergers of 2009 and 2013 the major part of the area of the municipality of Oulujoki is now part of Oulu.

== History ==
Expansion of Oulu.

The municipality was established in 1865 due to the administrative reform which separated parishes and municipalities. Its initial name was Oulun maalaiskunta, but it was renamed Oulujoki after the Oulu River in 1910. The municipality consisted of two disconnected parts separated by the municipality of Muhos. The municipal administration was located in Oulunsuun pirtti in the town of Oulu itself until 1941, when it was moved to central Oulu. Oulujoki never had an administrative seat in its own territory.

=== List of transferred territories ===
- Tuira, 1886/1892
- Alalaanila, 1911
- Toppila, 1916
- Kurkela, 1924
- Koskelankylä, Hintta and Laanila, 1938
- Kastelli and Erkkola, 1947
- Korvensuora, Haapalehto and Myllyoja, 1961

In 1965, the municipality of Oulujoki was disestablished. The main part was given to Oulu, while other parts were given to Haukipudas, Kempele, Kiiminki, Oulunsalo, Tyrnävä, Utajärvi and Ylikiiminki.

=== Proposed reestablishment ===
In 2006, a group of locals led by Paavo Vasala made a proposition to separate the old Oulujoki municipality from Oulu, stating that the town's government has been neglecting the area due to earlier conflicts between the town and the local land owners over the usage of the lands.

== See also ==
- Oulu River
