= Jänhijoki =

Village in Tavastia, Finland

Coordinates: 60.8693°N 23.4710°E

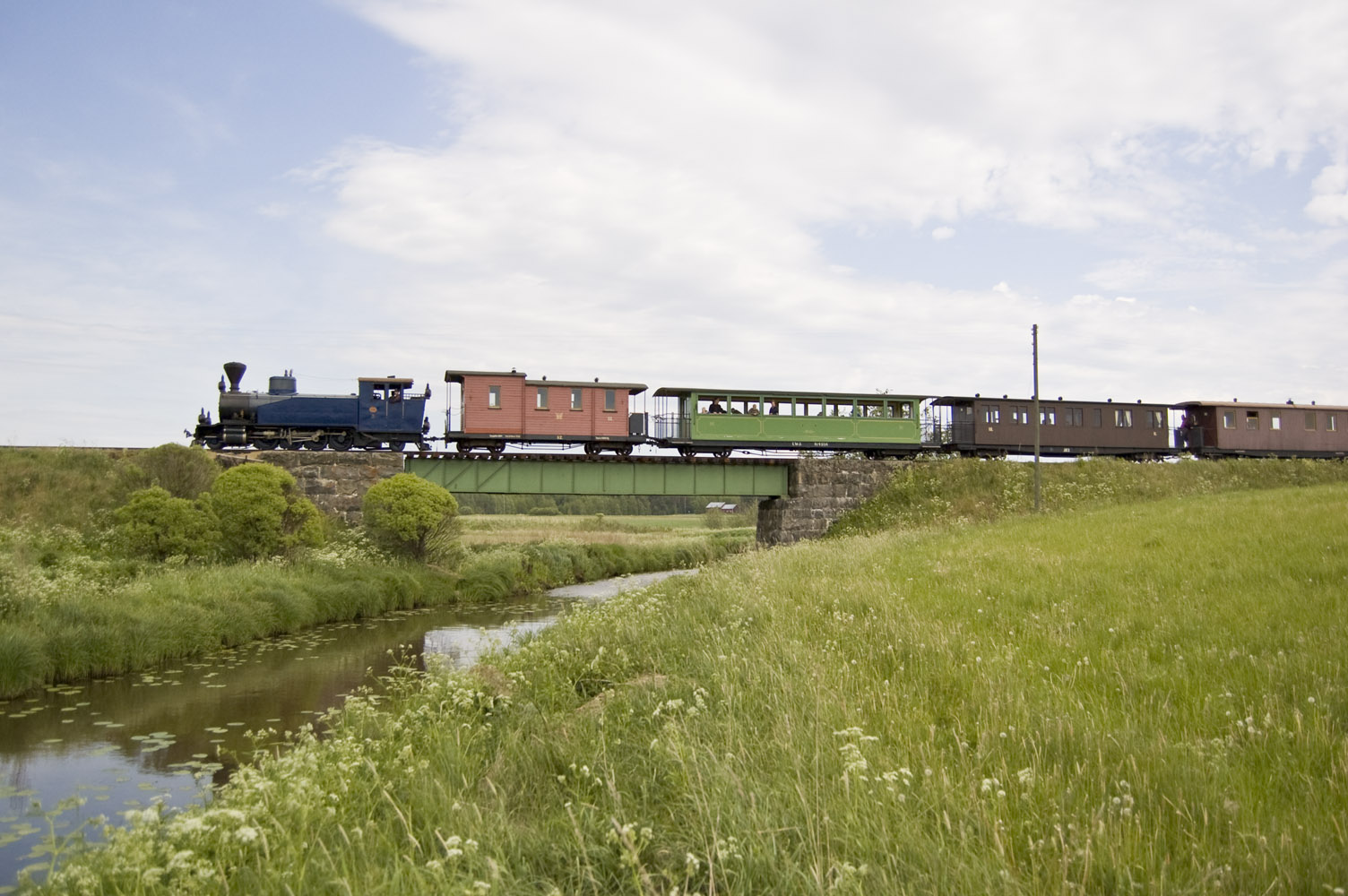
Jänhijoki railway bridge, Jokioinen

Jänhijoki is one of the villages in Jokioinen municipality, in Kanta-Häme, Finland. The village is located approximately 7 kilometres (4.3 mi) north from the centre of Jokioinen, on the Jänhijoki river. The village is formed by Rehtijärvi, Latovainio and Kuuma villages. Other nearby villages include Minkiö railway station and Kiipu. According to 2000 census, the villages of Jänhijoki had a total of 1,057 inhabitants.
