= Rokua National Park =

National park in Northern Ostrobothnia, Finland

- IUCN category II (national park)
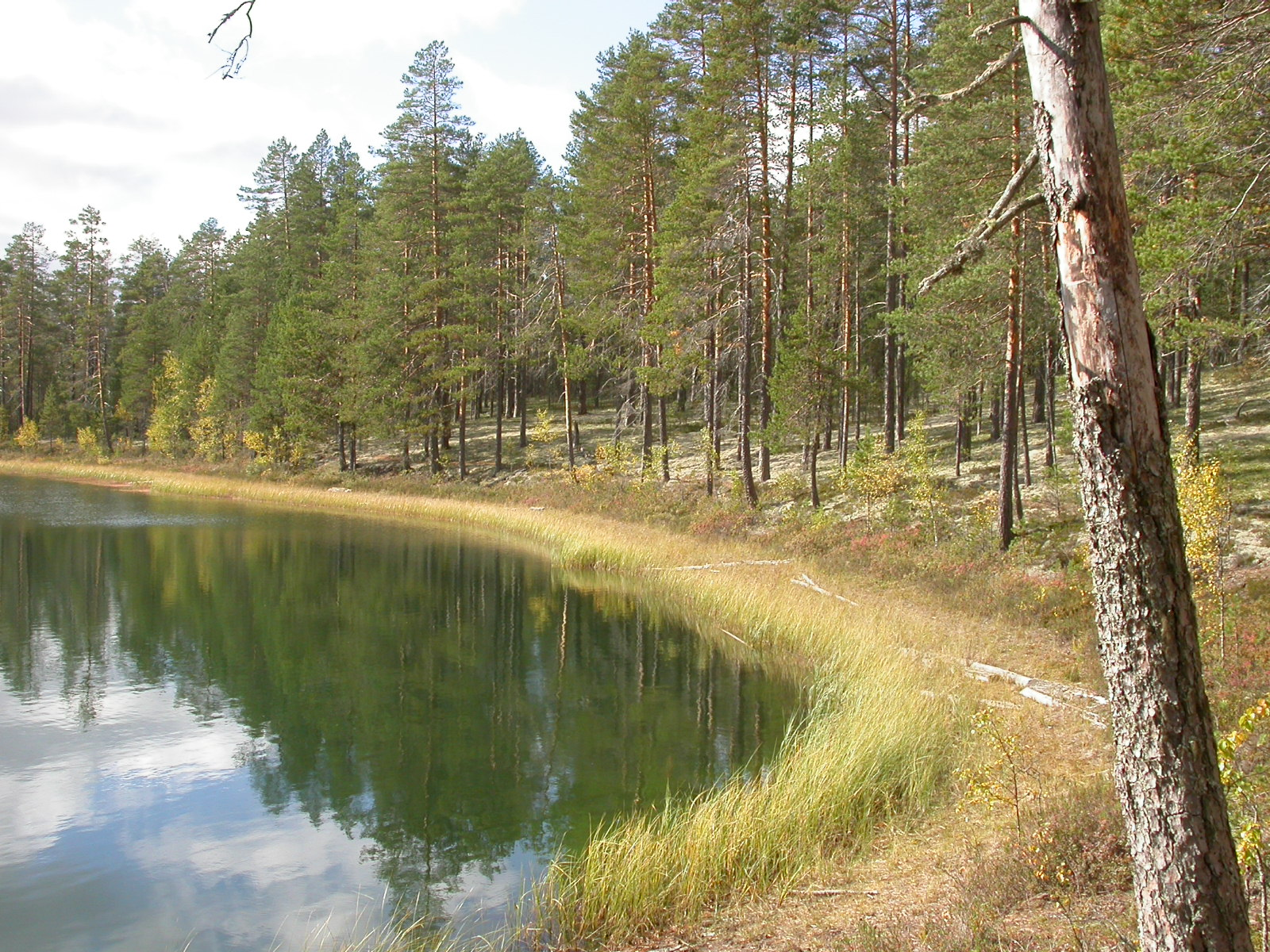

- Location within Finland
- Location: Northern Ostrobothnia, Finland
- Coordinates: 64°33′22″N 26°30′36″E
- Area: 8.8 km^{2} (3.4 sq mi)
- Established: 1956
- Visitors: 50,700 (in 2024)
- Governing body: Metsähallitus
- Website: https://www.luontoon.fi/en/destinations/rokua-national-park

Rokua National Park (Finnish: Rokuan kansallispuisto) is a UNESCO Global Geopark in the Northern Ostrobothnia region of Finland.

== Location ==
The national park is located on the southern side of the Rokuanvaara Hill, where old pine forests grow in their natural state. The park lies within the municipalities of Vaala, Muhos and Utajärvi and in between the cities of Oulu and Kajaani.

== Geology ==
The bedrock of the Baltic Shield as well as Quaternary landforms are displayed within the park. Amongst the glacial landforms found in the park are:

- Drumlins
- Eskers
- Hummocky moraines
- Kettle holes
- Terminal moraines

Post-glacial development has left berms, ravines, dunes and peat bogs in the park area.

== Syvyydenkaivo ==
Syvyydenkaivo, "the Well of the Depths", is the deepest kettle hole in Finland, with a measured depth of more than 164 feet (50 m).

== See also ==
- List of national parks of Finland
- Protected areas of Finland
- Rokua Geopark
- Rokua
