= Jokioinen railway station =

Railway station in Jokioinen, Finland

Jokioinen
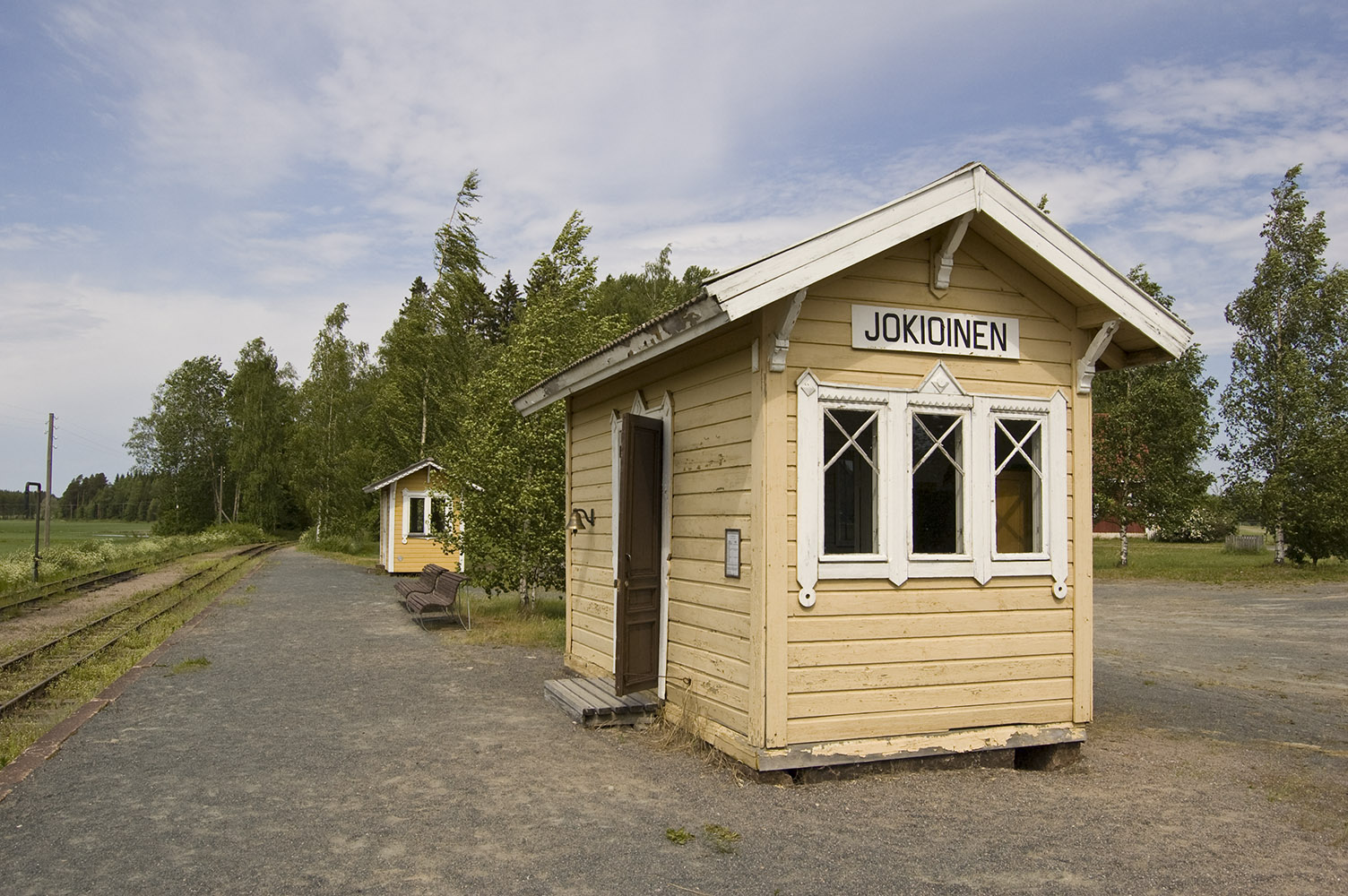

General information
- Location: Humppilantie; 31600 Jokioinen
- Coordinates: 60°48.846′N 23°28.925′E
- System: Heritage railway station
- Owner: Jokioinen Museum Railway
- Platforms: 1

History
- Opened: 1978 (original station opened in 1898 further south)
Route map
Location

Jokioinen station (Jok, Jockis station in Swedish) is the southernmost station on Jokioinen Museum Railway. The station is located 14.2 kilometres (8.8 mi) from the Humppila station, in the municipality of Jokioinen in Finland.

== Station buildings ==
=== The original station ===
The original station of Jokioinen Railway was located about 1 kilometre (0.62 mi) south of the current station. The station was built in 1898 and was in use until 1974, when the Jokioinen Railway was closed. The station building and the original railway yard were dismantled in 1974–1982.

=== Current station ===
The current Jokioinen station was built by the Jokioinen Museum Railway and it was opened to traffic on July 25, 1978, and ticket sales started on July 30. The original station building was a tiny shelter for a switchman brought from Mellilä. In 1980 an old building of Kumila station on Turku-Toijala railway line was moved to Jokioinen. The current platform was built in 1995 when the siding at the station was rebuilt to accommodate longer trains. In spring 2001 an information shelter was erected. It was built at Minkiö station and transported to the location by a train.

The station has one siding to run a locomotive around the train. There is also a water point on the siding. Also a part of the station is an old mainline track to Forssa. The track called Siirappiraide (Syrup spur) continues about 800 metres (2,600 ft) until the Jokioinen sugar factory.
