= Michael Maria Penttilä =

Finnish serial killer (born 1965)

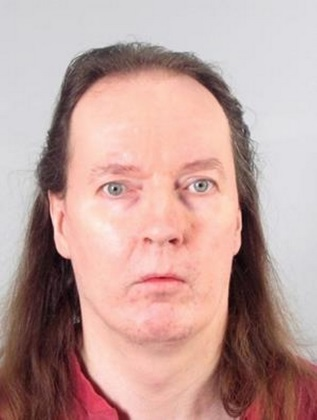
- Born: Jukka Torsten Lindholm; July 1965 (age 61); Oulu, Finland
- Spouse: Hannele Pentholm (divorced)
- Status: Incarcerated
- Conviction: Murder
- Penalty: Life imprisonment

Details
- Victims: 4
- Span of crimes: 1985–2018
- Country: Finland
- Date apprehended: 6 May 2018

Michael Maria Penttilä (born Jukka Torsten Lindholm, July 1965) is a Finnish serial killer. According to Finnish crime magazine Alibi, he is the only Finn that fits FBI's description of a serial killer.

Despite his danger, Lindholm was repeatedly released and committed further murders after his releases. In a 2009 mental health survey, Penttilä said that he had wanted to be a woman since he was young. In prison, he tried to wear women's clothes and wanted to look like a woman.

== Adolescent crimes ==
In November 1981, 16-year-old Penttilä, at the time known as Jukka Lindholm, kidnapped a 15-year-old girl. He forced the girl into a basement, where he beat, choked with scarves, and threatened to rape her. He wore black leather gloves during the attack. The girl managed to escape, and Penttilä was given a suspended sentence and fined.

In 1984, he was given a prison sentence for further attacks and thefts. He was released in 1985.

== First murders ==
Penttilä killed his mother, 48-year-old barmaid Laina Lahja Orvokki Lindholm, in their Oulu apartment on 26 August 1985. Penttilä as well as his mother's male friend were suspected of the murder, but it remained unsolved until Penttilä confessed decades later.

The next murder Penttilä committed was on 26 July 1986. He met two 12-year-old girls in downtown Oulu and persuaded them to "come to his apartment, so he could lend them a few marks for alcohol". Once in his residence, he locked one of the girls in his bathroom. The other girl, Titta Marjaana Kotaniemi, was knocked down on to the floor and was strangled to death by Penttilä. After some time, he released the other girl from the bathroom and sexually assaulted her. The girl managed to escape his grasp and ran from the apartment towards the stairway. Penttilä fled to the nearby forest, where the police soon caught him. He was drunk, measuring 1.75 on the BAC scale.

In connection with the murder of Kotaniemi, Penttilä confessed to the police that he was mistreated by his mother. According to his statements, he had worn his mother's blue leather gloves and the red-colored scarf before killing her in 1985. He said that he was angered by his mother not being able to release him from the youth facility that he was sentenced to in 1984, and that she had been dating a new man and preferred to live with him rather than Penttilä's biological father. Later, in the Oulu court, he recanted his confession and claimed he had been using multiple psychoactive drugs at once.

The Oulu District Court issued its judgment on 17 March 1987. The court ruled that Penttilä had been guilty of two charges of manslaughter as well as other crimes, condemning him to 9 years and 7 months imprisonment. However, the Rovaniemi Appellate Court later held that Laina Lindholm's death was not intentional and, instead, an assault or negligent homicide, which reduced his sentence to 7 years imprisonment. He was granted parole in May 1992.

== Third murder ==
On 31 May 1993, Penttilä strangled a 42-year-old woman with a cloth belt in her Kempele apartment. He at first vehemently denied the accusation that he was responsible, claiming that somebody had set him up. On 23 June 1993, he escaped from the Oulu County Police Station with a man.

The Oulu District Court considered Penttilä to be completely sane and sentenced him to 9.5 years imprisonment on 13 December 1993.

Following the judgment by the District Court, Penttilä contacted the investigators. He admitted to having killed the woman, but claimed that it was an accident. According to him, he had explicitly proposed sex to the women and was playing around the neck and did not realize that the woman had died due to choking. Penttilä also said that he wandered off to his mother's grave after the murder, staying there for a few hours. The Appellate Court subsequently changed the sentence to 10.5 years, sending him to a special institution.

According to psychiatric reports, Penttilä admired the primordial, violent manhood of his teenage years – despite starting to wear dresses and women's underwear while in prison. The head of the Hämeenlinna Center forbade this, and Penttilä subsequently complained to the Parliament's ombudsman.

== Later legal troubles ==
Penttilä was released on parole in November 2008. Before his release, he was evaluated, and it was concluded that he was not yet ready for civilian life.

In prison, he married Hannele Pentholm, who was sentenced to life imprisonment for her husband's murder. They were married for a couple of years. At the time he renamed himself to Michael Maria Pentholm.

He invited a woman to his house in May 2009 where he tried to strangle the woman with both hands from behind.

In August 2009, Penttilä bought an Oulu apartment in Toppila via a professional jury magazine announcement. He began to choke a woman who was setting up a massage table in the apartment's living room.

On 11 June 2010, the Oulu District Court sentenced Penttilä to six years imprisonment for three counts of attempted manslaughter and numerous assaults. Authorities ordered him to serve his whole sentence because, based on a psychological evaluation, he was deemed to be a dangerous offender. In April 2011, the Rovaniemi Appellate Court considered Penttilä to have committed only three aggravated assaults, lowering the sentence to 4 years and 5 months. At the same time, the Appellate Court ruled that the prerequisites for ordering Penttilä to serve his entire sentence in jail did not exist.

On 2 March 2012, the Oulu District Court condemned Penttilä to 4 years and 4 months for aggravated rape, gross ill-treatment, and false imprisonment. The rape and false imprisonment had taken place on 21–22 August 2009 at a hotel in Oulu, and the assault at a business in May 2009 in his apartment in Myllyoja. The authorities ordered Penttilä to serve his full sentence in jail.

On Tuesday, 13 October 2015, the now renamed Michael Penttilä escaped from Laukaa's open prison during a prisoner shopping trip, but was caught the following day. He was granted parole in the spring of 2016. Penttilä's jail sentence was prolonged due to attempt and the entire term of his sentence was changed to imprisonment in a closed prison.

Penttilä was released on Christmas 2016. In April 2017, the police ordered for him to be arrested again for an alleged aggravated crime and the preparation of a criminal offense, but the Helsinki District Court released him after the investigation. In May 2017, the Helsinki Appellate Court annulled the decision and Penttilä was rearrested. On 7 July 2017, the Helsinki District Court dismissed the charge of aggravated criminal offense and ordered him to be released. In May 2018, the Appellate Court reversed the decision, sentencing Penttilä was to 2 years and 6 months imprisonment and to pay the victim compensation of 4,000 euros.

On 13 April 2018, Penttilä killed a sex worker in a Helsinki apartment. The victim was found on 4 May and Penttilä was arrested two days later in Helsinki, suspected of murder. On 17 May 2018, the police announced that Penttilä had admitted during interrogations that he had committed the homicide. In July, the Helsinki District Court sentenced him to life imprisonment for murder. During the murder, he had used several tools such as leather belts, tights, and his bare hands. Penttilä later announced that he would be appealing the court's decision. Helsinki Appellate Court upheld his sentence, but dropped the premeditation from the offence.

== See also ==
- List of serial killers by country
