= Jänhijoki (river) =

Jänhijoki River
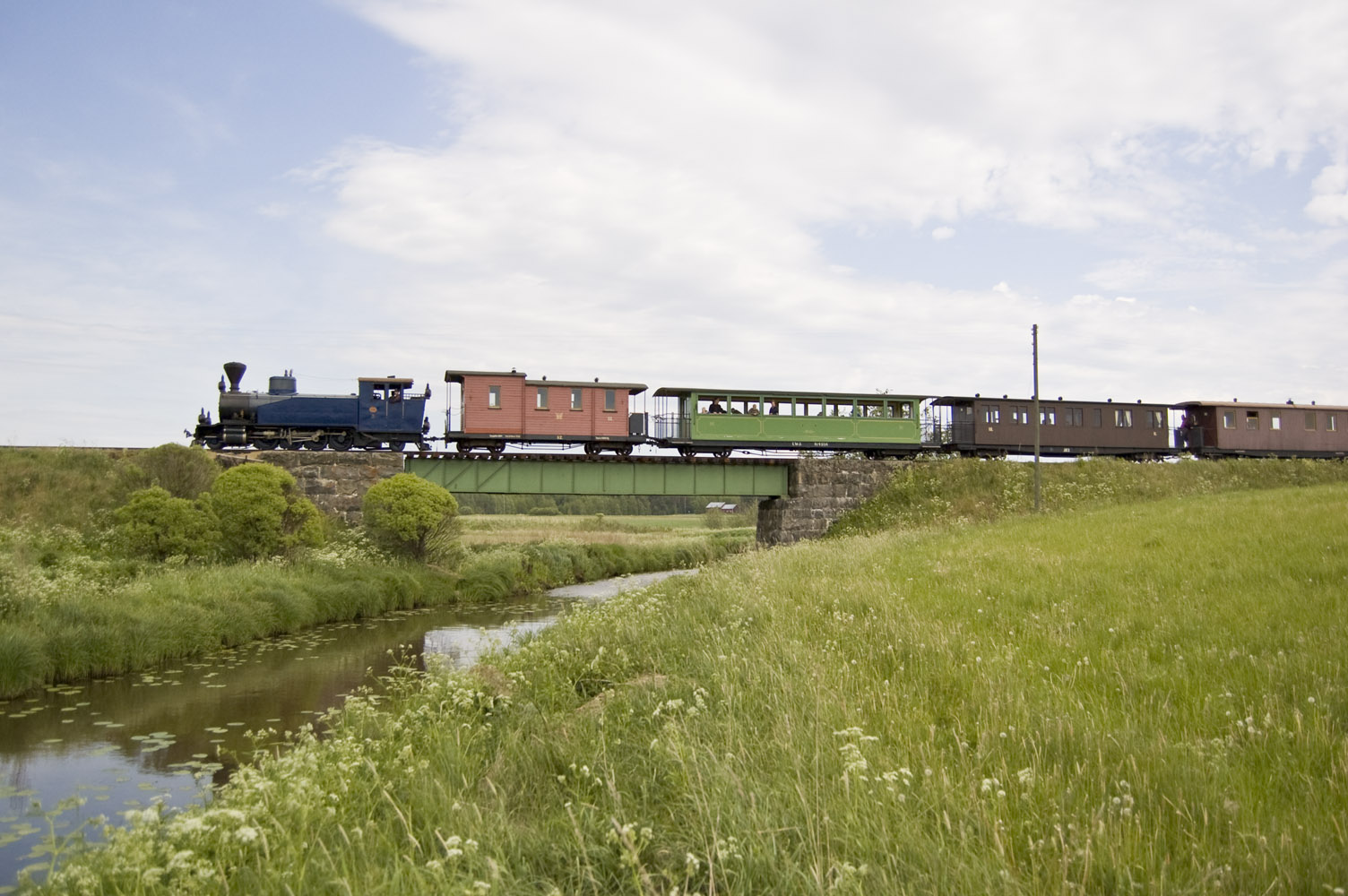

Location
- Country: Finland
- Municipalities: Tammela; Forssa; Jokioinen

Physical characteristics
- Source
  - location: Jänijärvi, Tammela lake area
  - coordinates: 60°48′N 023°46′E
- Mouth: Loimijoki
  - coordinates: 60.7998°N 23.4302°E
- Length: 33 km (21 mi)
- Basin size: 205 km^{2} (79 sq mi)

Jänhijoki is a tributary of Loimijoki river in Finland. Its sources are in lake Jänijärvi in the Tammela municipality in the Kanta-Häme region in Finland. It starts as river Peräjoki, flowing northwest from Jänijärvi towards Jokioinen. The name changes to Jänhijoki where the Peräjoki river and Tyytynoja creek merge. When reaching Jokioinen it flows past the villages of Jänhijoki, past Minkiö railway station where it is crossed over by the Jänhijoki railway bridge and to Kiipu before merging with river Loimijoki.

== Sources ==
- Jänhijoki (Finnish)
