= Eino Kankaanpää =

Finnish farmer, bank director and politician (1914–1974)

Eino Mikael Kankaanpää (14 September 1914 – 3 December 1974) was a Finnish farmer, bank director and politician, born in Humppila. He was a member of the Parliament of Finland from 27 January to 22 March 1970, representing the Centre Party. He was a presidential elector in the 1962 and 1968 presidential elections.
