= Miina Sillanpää =

Finnish politician (1866–1952)

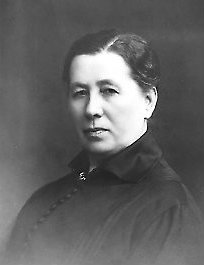

Deputy Minister of Social Affairs
- In office 13 December 1926 – 17 December 1927
- President: Lauri Kristian Relander
- Prime Minister: Väinö Tanner

Personal details
- Born: Vilhelmiina Riktig; 4 June 1866 Jokioinen, Finland, Russian Empire
- Died: 3 April 1952 (aged 85) Helsinki, Finland
- Resting place: Near from Jokioinen Church, Jokioinen
- Party: Social Democratic Party (1918–1919, 1933–1940)

Miina Sillanpää (originally Vilhelmiina Riktig, 4 June 1866 – 3 April 1952) was a Finnish politician. She served as Deputy Minister of Social Affairs in 1926–1927. She was Finland's first female minister and a key figure in the workers' movement. In 2016, the Finnish government made 1 October an official flag flying day in honour of Sillanpää. She was involved in the preparation of Finland's first Municipal Homemaking Act.

== Life ==
Sillanpää was born in Jokioinen, during the famine years, to peasants Juho and Leena (née Roth) Riktig, who had nine children. She started her work career at the age of twelve at the Forssa cotton factory, and later in the Jokioinen nail factory. At the age of 18 she moved to Porvoo to work as a maid and changed her name from Vilhelmiina Riktig to Miina Sillanpää. In 1898 she started and three years later she became the director of the Servants' Association. She held this position for about 50 years.

From 1900 to 1915, she worked as caretaker of the Helsinki Household Workers' Association's Servants' Home and Employment Agency. During this time in 1906 Finland became the first European country to allow all women to vote and the first country in the world to allow women to run for office. In 1907 she became one of the first 19 women in Finland to be elected to parliament, effectively the first 19 elected women parliamentarian in the world. Sillanpää worked as inspector of eateries and cafés of Osuusliike Elanto from 1916 to 1932 and as secretary of the Social Democratic Party Working Women's Association from 1932 to 1936.

Sillanpää did not have much of a school education – she had only received instruction from itinerant teachers (Finnish kiertokoulut, literally "itinerant schools") and at a factory school.

Sillanpää was awarded the honorary title of talousneuvos in 1939, and in 1949 she received the Finnish Cultural Foundation's award for merit for her life's work from President Paasikivi.

== As a social democrat ==
Miina Sillanpää was not a political theoretician, instead she was active in social democratic association activity. She especially campaigned for the rights of working and single women. In the 1930s, she was very active in establishing women's shelters (ensikoti). She was a member of the party activity group of the Social Democratic Party from 1918 to 1919 and from 1933 to 1940, and also worked as chairwoman of the Social Democratic Women's Association and the Social Democratic Working Women's Association.

Miina Sillanpää did not participate in the civil war of 1918; together with Väinö Tanner and Matti Paasivuori she opposed both the Red and White Guards and urged for peace in Finland.

== Member of parliament ==
Miina Sillanpää was one of the first nineteen female members of the Parliament of Finland, who were elected in 1907. She served as a member of parliament for a total of 38 years: 1907–1911, 1913–1917, 1919–1933 and 1936–1948.

Upon election as the deputy Minister of Social Affairs in the Väinö Tanner government of 1926–1927, she became Finland's first female minister.

Sillanpää acted as an official elector of the President of Finland in 1925, 1931, 1937, 1940 and 1943.

== Legacy ==
Sillanpää died in Helsinki, aged 85. In 2016 The Finnish government made 1 October an official day to raise the Finnish flag in honour of Sillanpää.

== Journalistic career ==
Sillanpää was also a journalist. She worked as editor of the Palvelijatar ("female servant") magazine from 1905 to 1906, in the Työläisnainen ("working woman") magazine from 1907 to 1916, and in the Toveritar ("female comrade") magazine from 1922 to 1943.

== Literature ==
- Korppi-Tommola, Aura (2016), Miina Sillanpää - edelläkävijä, Helsinki: Suomen kirjallisuuden seura, ISBN 978-952-222-724-9
- Oma Mäkikossa: Yhteiskunnalle omistettu elämä. Miina Sillanpään elämän ja työn vaiheita. (Tammi 1947)
- Martta Salmela-Järvinen: Miina Sillanpää, legenda jo eläessään. (WSOY-Porvoo 1973)
- Miina Sillanpään bibliografia. (Publications of the Miina Sillanpää foundation A:1. Vammalan Kirjapaina 1989)
