= Rokua railway =

Coordinates: 64.5937°N 26.5080°E

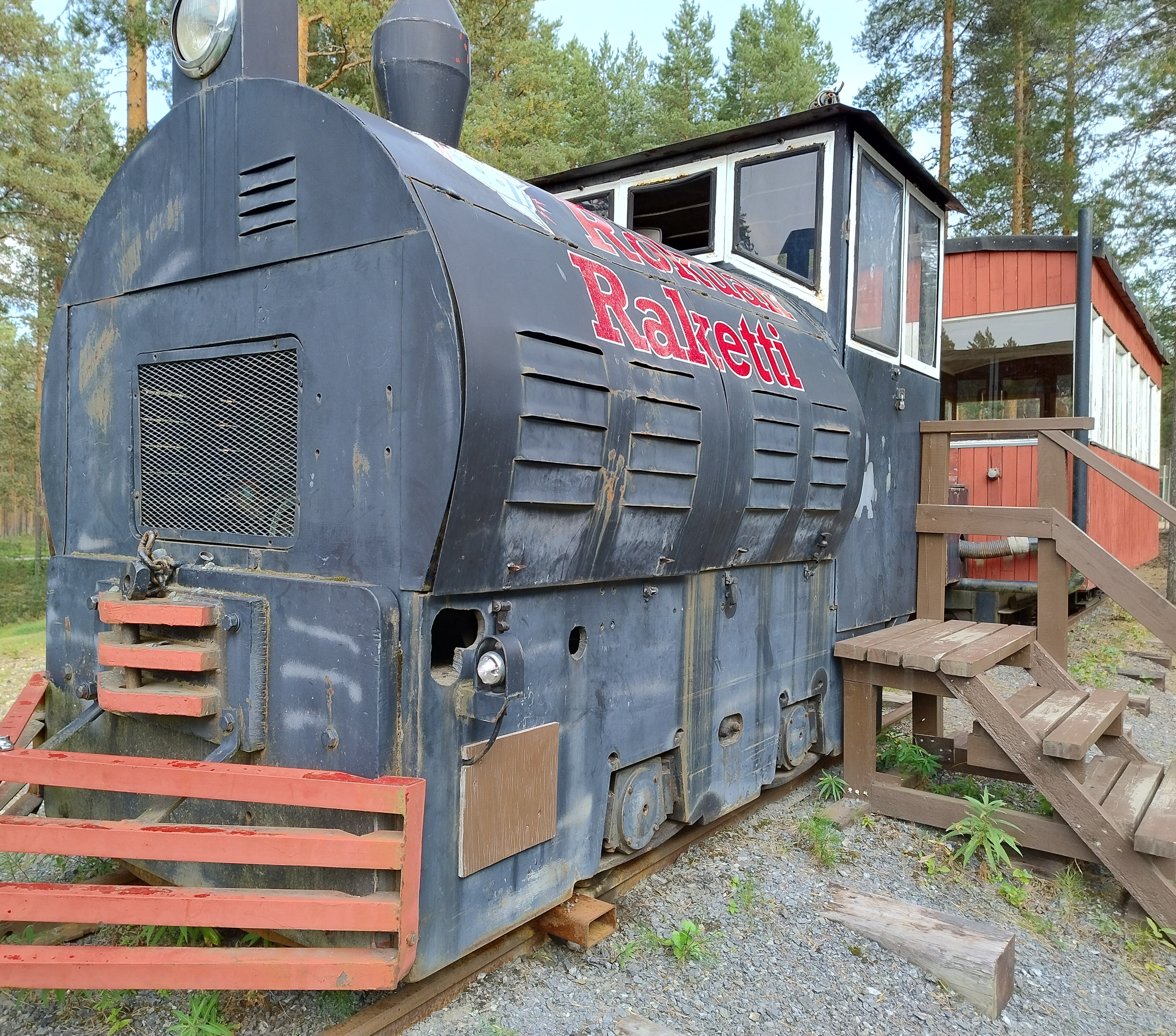
- Rokuan Raketti Diesel locomotive

Overview
- Locale: Rokua, Utajärvi, Finland

History
- Opened: July 1986
- Closed: May 2022

Technical
- Line length: 3.3 km (2.1 mi)
- Track gauge: 900 mm (2 ft 11 7/16 in)

The Rokua railway or Children's Land Railway (Finnish: Rokuan rautatie or Lastenmaan rautatie), was a 3.3-kilometre (2.1 mi) long narrow gauge railway operating in the Rokua region in Utajärvi municipality in Finland. The railway was opened in July 1986 and had a gauge of 900 millimetres (3 ft).

The line was demolished by Utajärvi municipality in May 2022, when the price of scrap steel was high.

== Route ==
The line connected the Hotel Rokuanhovi with the Rokua Fitness Centre, running through moraine and dune covered terrain. There were balloon loops at both ends of the line, and the passenger carriages had doors on only one side. There were no intermediate stations.

== Rolling stock ==
The train was hauled by a DHL-15 diesel hydraulic locomotive equipped with 37.5-kilowatt Dent engine. The locomotive weighs around five tonnes. The two 24-seat passenger carriages were made by Tuomo Takalo ky of Nivala. After the closure and demolition, the locomotive and one coach was retained as a memorial.
