= Municipal Homemaking Act =

In 1950 Finland's first Municipal Homemaking Act (Finnish: Laki kunnallisista kodinhoitajista, 272/1950) was passed. Miina Sillanpää was involved in its preparation. The system of municipal homemakers was created to help rural families with some children who lived in poverty. The municipal homemakers had their salaries paid by the municipality.
