= Oulujoki Church =

- Church of the Holy Spirit
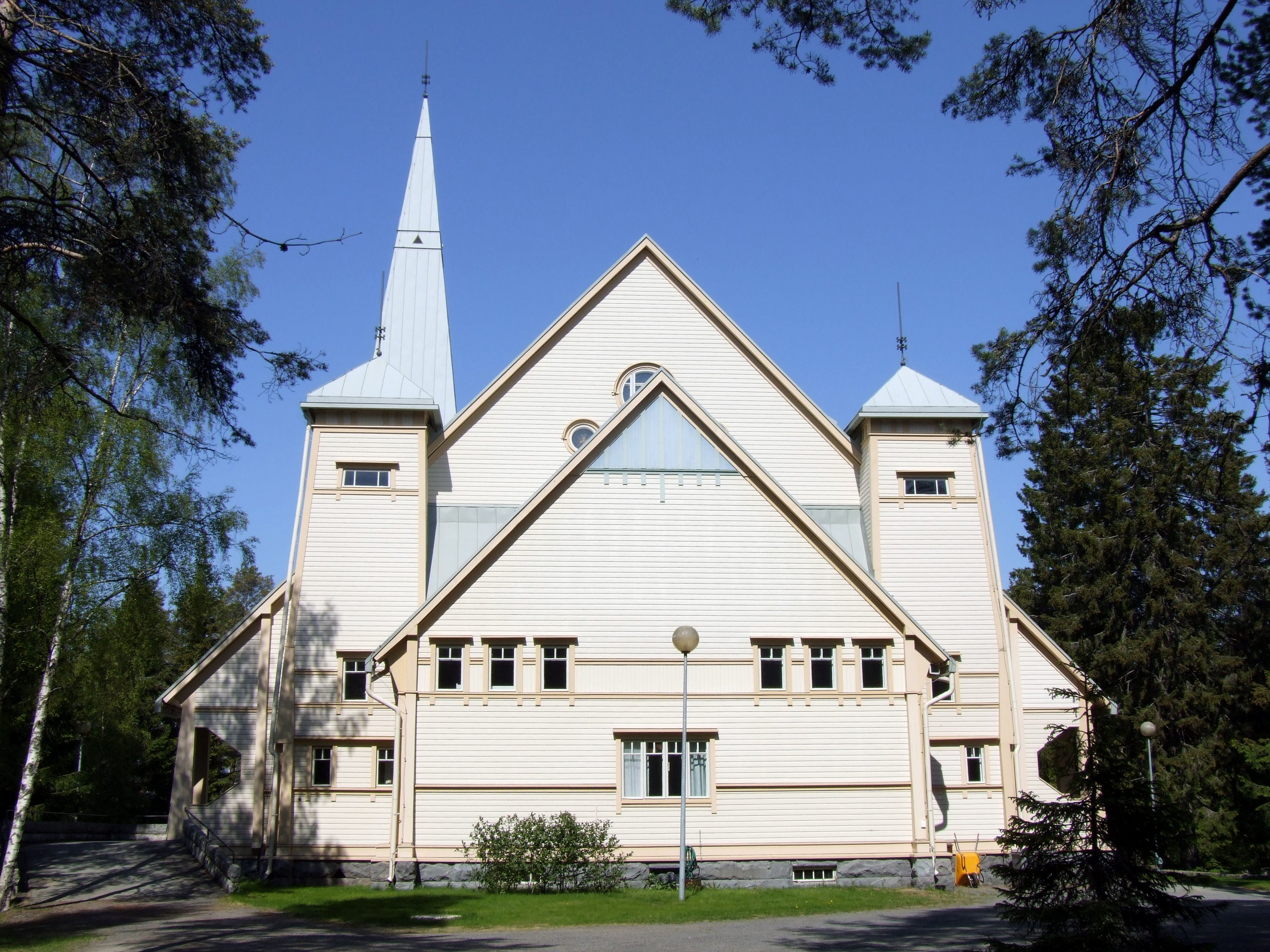
- Oulujoki Church
- 65°00′20″N 025°33′46″E
- Location: Kirkkokangas, Oulu
- Country: Finland
- Denomination: Lutheran
- Website: www.oulunseurakunnat.fi/oulujoenkirkko

History
- Status: Church

Architecture
- Functional status: Active
- Architect: Victor J. Sucksdorff
- Style: Art Nouveau
- Completed: 1908

Administration
- Diocese: Diocese of Oulu
- Parish: Oulujoki parish

The Oulujoki Church is an evangelical Lutheran church in Kirkkokangas neighbourhood in Oulu, Finland.

The wooden church, named the Church of the Holy Spirit, was built for the former Oulu rural municipality in 1907–1908. It was designed in the Art Nouveau style by architect Viktor J. Sucksdorff.

The Art Nouveau interior of the Oulujoki church was modernized in the 1950s, but the new look did not please people and it was restored in the mid–1980s.
