= Työläisnainen =

Political magazine published in Finland (1906–1923)

- Editor: Miina Sillanpää
- Categories: Political magazine; Women's magazine
- Frequency: Weekly; Irregular
- Founded: 1906
- First issue: November 1906
- Final issue: 1923
- Company: Finnish Social Democratic Women's Union
- Country: Finland
- Based in: Helsinki
- Language: Finnish

Työläisnainen (Finnish: Working Woman) was the weekly magazine of the Finnish Social Democratic Women's Union. It was published between 1906 and 1923 in Helsinki, Finland.

== History and profile ==
The magazine was started with the title Palvelijatar in November 1906. It was the official organ of the Finnish Social Democratic Women's Union and came out weekly. Its title was later changed to Työläisnainen. Miina Sillanpää, Hilja Pärssinen and Anni Huotari were among the leading contributors of the magazine. Miina Sillanpää edited it between 1907 and 1916. The magazine featured articles by the Finnish communist and socialist women and men living in Finland and also, by those who had to settle in Russia immediately after the Civil War in 1918. Työläisnainen also covered translations from foreign publications written by well-known Bolshevik women activists such as Alexandra Kollontai.

Työläisnainen appeared irregularly from 1917 to 1921. The magazine was redesigned as a communist publication in 1920 when the communists began to head the Finnish Social Democratic Women's Union. Next year its editors were the future social democratic women politicians. The magazine ceased publication in 1923.
