= Rokua =

Region and national park in Finland

Coordinates: 64.556°N 26.511°E

The Rokua region, also known as the Rokuanvaara region, is a region known for its moraine and dunes. The region covers parts of the municipalities of Muhos, Utajärvi and Vaala in the province of Oulu in Finland.

The Rokuanvaara formation was formed at the end of the Wisconsin glaciation period, when fine-grain soil was washed into the region by melting waters. In 1956 the Rokua National Park was established to protect and to preserve the region.

The area is a popular resort among cottagers and sports people alike. The largest fitness center in Northern Finland, Rokua Fitness Center, is located in the Rokua region. There are also several rental cottages, as well as Hotel Rokuanhovi. The narrow-gauge Rokua railway connects the hotel and the fitness center.

== Geopark ==
Rokua Geopark is a UNESCO Global Geopark located in north-central Finland. The park lies within the municipalities of Vaala, Muhos and Utajärvi (where there is a Geological Time Trail,) and in between the cities of Oulu and Kajaani. The bedrock of the Baltic Shield as well as Quaternary landforms are displayed within the park. Amongst the glacial landforms found in the park are:

- Drumlins
- Eskers
- Hummocky moraines
- Kettle holes
- Terminal moraines

Post-glacial development has left berms, ravines, dunes and peat bogs in the park area.
