= Risto Jalo =

Finnish ice hockey player (born 1962)

- Born: July 18, 1962 (age 63) Humppila, Finland
- Height: 5 ft 11 in (180 cm)
- Weight: 176 lb (80 kg; 12 st 8 lb)
- Position: Centre
- Shot: Left
- Played for: KOOVEE; Ilves; Edmonton Oilers; HPK; HC Fassa
- National team: Finland
- NHL draft: 131st overall, 1981; Washington Capitals
- Playing career: 1979–1998

Risto Uolevi Jalo (born July 18, 1962) is a Finnish retired professional ice hockey player and current general manager of Ilves in the Finnish Liiga. He played in the SM-liiga with KOOVEE, Ilves, and HPK between 1979 and 1998. He also played 3 games in the National Hockey League with the Edmonton Oilers during the 1985–86 season. Internationally Jalo played for the Finnish national team at several tournaments, including four World Championships and the 1984 Winter Olympics. In 2004 he was inducted into the Finnish Hockey Hall of Fame. He served as general manager of Ilves from 1999 to 2004, and again since 2017.

== Career statistics ==
=== Regular season and playoffs ===
			Regular season					Playoffs
Season	Team	League	GP	G	A	Pts	PIM	GP	G	A	Pts	PIM
1979–80	KOOVEE	SMl	32	13	10	23	16	—	—	—	—	—
1980–81	Ilves	SMl	16	3	3	6	2	2	0	0	0	0
1981–82	Ilves	SMl	34	17	20	37	8	—	—	—	—	—
1982–83	Ilves	SMl	33	14	36	50	20	2	0	2	2	0
1983–84	Ilves	SMl	36	13	31	44	30	2	2	2	4	0
1983–84	Olympiajoukkue	SMl	5	4	4	8	0	—	—	—	—	—
1984–85	Ilves	SMl	35	17	21	38	18	9	3	4	7	5
1985–86	Ilves	SMl	30	17	31	48	30	—	—	—	—	—
1985–86	Edmonton Oilers	NHL	3	0	3	3	0	—	—	—	—	—
1986–87	Ilves	SMl	44	23	31	54	38	—	—	—	—	—
1987–88	Ilves	SMl	35	25	35	60	24	3	0	2	2	2
1988–89	Ilves	SMl	22	5	15	20	6	5	4	8	12	2
1989–90	Ilves	SMl	43	18	41	59	36	7	1	3	4	4
1990–91	IK Vita Hästen	SWE-2	33	15	23	38	34	—	—	—	—	—
1991–92	Ilves	SMl	40	14	18	32	16	—	—	—	—	—
1992–93	HC Fassa	ITA	15	13	13	26	2	—	—	—	—	—
1993–94	Ilves	SMl	46	12	23	35	32	4	0	2	2	0
1994–95	HPK	SMl	50	12	33	45	30	—	—	—	—	—
1995–96	HPK	SMl	34	10	21	31	40	9	1	3	4	18
1996–97	HPK	SMl	38	16	26	42	22	7	2	3	5	4
1997–98	HPK	SMl	21	4	10	14	53	—	—	—	—	—
NHL totals			3	0	3	3	0	—	—	—	—	—
SMl totals			594	237	409	646	421	56	17	32	49	37

=== International ===
Year	Team	Event	GP	G	A	Pts	PIM
1980	Finland	EJC	5	5	2	7	4
1981	Finland	WJC	5	1	5	6	6
1982	Finland	WJC	7	7	8	15	2
1983	Finland	WC	10	1	2	3	4
1984	Finland	OLY	6	2	6	8	4
1985	Finland	WC	10	2	2	4	2
1987	Finland	WC	10	0	4	4	10
1990	Finland	WC	10	1	2	3	0
Junior totals			17	13	15	28	12
Senior totals			46	6	16	22	20
