= Kiipu =

Finnish village

Coordinates: 60°50′N 23°23′E

Kiipu is a Finnish village of about 600 inhabitants situated close to the Highway 2 along the river Jänhijoki in them municipality of Jokioinen in the Tavastia Proper region. The village is located approximately 9 kilometers (5.6 mi) north from the centre of Jokioinen, and about 15 kilometers (9.3 mi) north-east of the town of Forssa. The village was selected as the Village of Tavastia in 2003.

The written history of Kiipu begins in the 14th century. The first map of the village was drawn in 1710. The village spreads on a large area along the river Jänhijoki and there is no real village center. The proper village of Kiipu is located about three kilometers (2 miles) from Minkiö railway station. The village house of the Kiipu Village Association, in 1953 with Swedish donation money built an old health center stands next to the Jokioinen Museum Railway at the Minkiö station. The village association and the Museum railway organise together many summer events.
