= Humppila =

- Municipality
- Humppilan kunta Humppila kommun
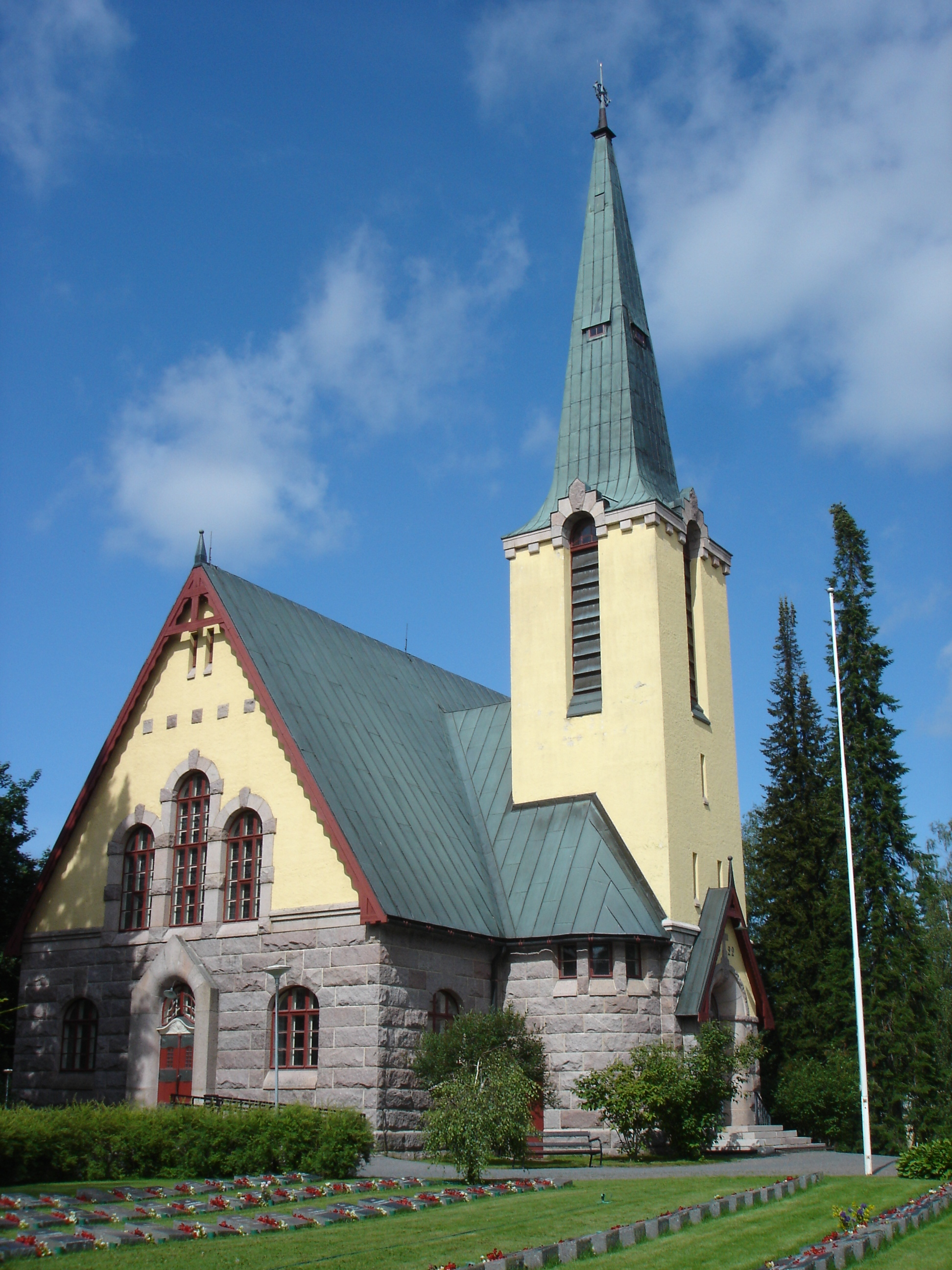
- The Humppila church

- Coat of arms

- Location of Humppila in Finland
- Interactive map of Humppila
- Coordinates: 60°55.5′N 023°22′E
- Country: Finland
- Region: Kanta-Häme
- Sub-region: Forssa
- Charter: 1873

Government
  - Municipal manager: Ph.D. Minna Ylikännö

Area (2018-01-01)
  - Total: 148.61 km^{2} (57.38 sq mi)
  - Land: 147.96 km^{2} (57.13 sq mi)
  - Water: 0.65 km^{2} (0.25 sq mi)
  - Rank: 277th largest in Finland

Population (2025-12-31)
  - Total: 2,074
  - Rank: 251st largest in Finland
  - Density: 14.02/km^{2} (36.3/sq mi)

Population by native language
  - Finnish: 97.1% (official)
  - Others: 2.9%

Population by age
  - 0 to 14: 14.4%
  - 15 to 64: 56.1%
  - 65 or older: 29.5%
- Time zone: UTC+02:00 (EET)
  - Summer (DST): UTC+03:00 (EEST)
- Website: www.humppila.fi/english/

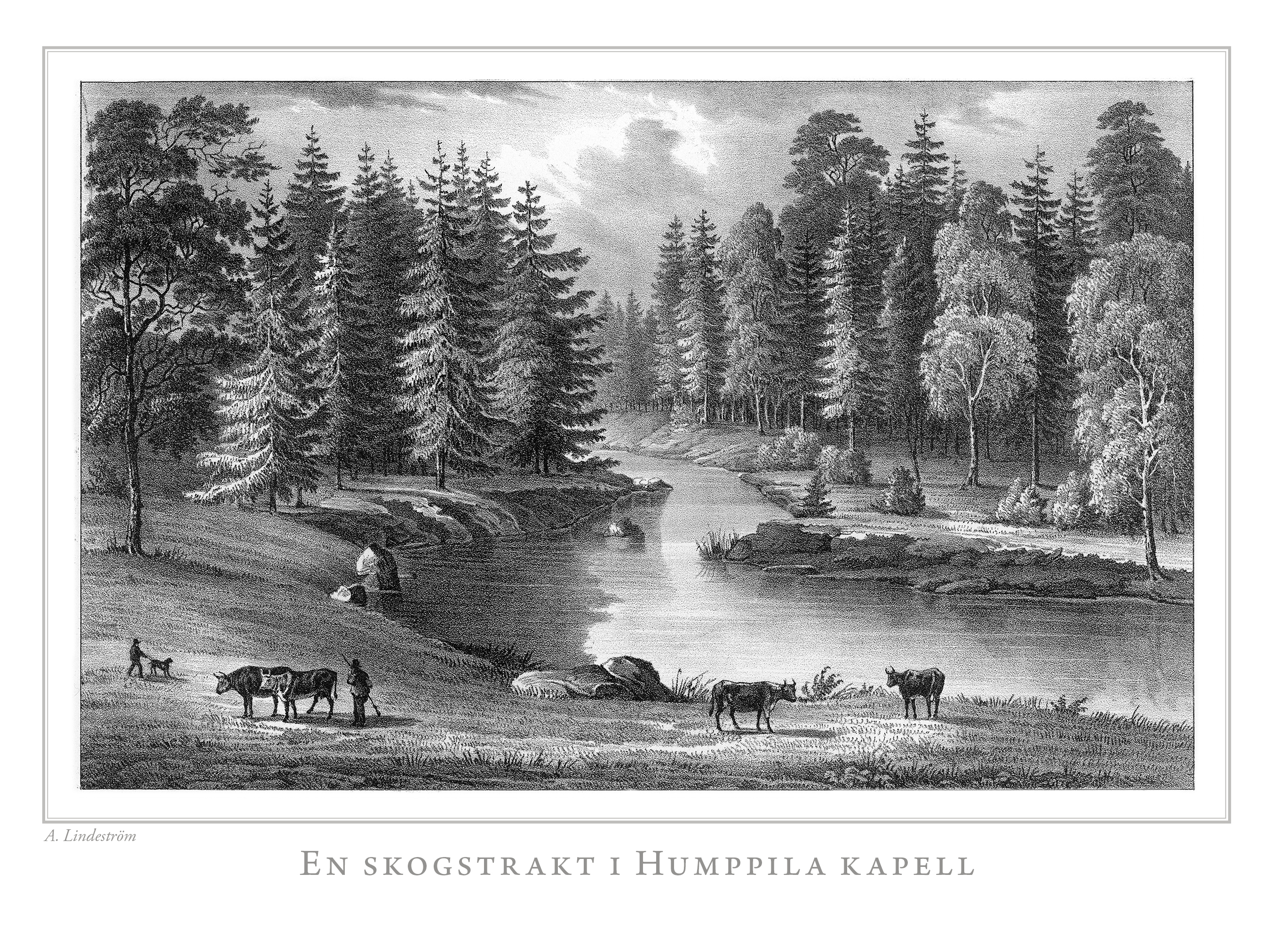
Illustration of woods in Humppila in Finland framstäldt i teckningar edited by Zacharias Topelius and published 1845-1852.

Humppila is a municipality of Finland. It is located in the Kanta-Häme region. The municipality has a population of 2,074 (31 December 2025), which make it the smallest municipality in Kanta-Häme in terms of population. It covers an area of 148.61 square kilometres (57.38 sq mi) of which 0.65 km^{2} (0.25 sq mi) is water. The population density is 14.02 inhabitants per square kilometre (36.3/sq mi).

The municipality owes the essence of its development to the arrival of the Turku–Toijala railway in 1876. Today, Humppila remains a stop for trains using this line and the once closed railway station has been reopened for passengers. From 1898 until 1974, Humppila was the starting point of the narrow gauge Jokioinen Railway, a 22-kilometre (14 mi) line to the town of Forssa. Today the remaining 15 kilometres (9 mi) of this line make the Jokioinen Museum Railway. There are two significant traffic highways through Humppila municipality: Highway 2 (between Vihti and Pori) and Highway 9 (between Turku and Tampere).

Neighbouring municipalities are Forssa, Jokioinen, Ypäjä, Loimaa, Punkalaidun, and Urjala. The municipality of Humppila is unilingually Finnish.

== Villages ==
Vitikka, Huhtaa, Humppila, Koivisto, Murto, Taipale, Venäjä, and Myllynkulma

== Economy ==
Major employers in Humppila are the Humppila municipality, Kenkämaailma (shoe retail), Humppilan Osuuspankki (banking), Iittala Group Humppila Glassworks, and Maviteknik Oy (engineering). Employment structure by trade at the end of 2004 was following: Agriculture and forestry economics 16.3%, industry 22.0%, services 58.5%, unknown 3.2%.

== Transport ==
Humppila is served by Onnibus route Helsinki—Pori.

== Notable individuals ==
- Risto Jalo, ice hockey player
- Waldemar Bergroth, politician
- Heljä Liukko-Sundström, ceramicist kept her studio, Ateljé Heljä in Humppila
