= Jokioinen Museum Railway =

Heritage railway line in Finland

Coordinates: 60°51′46″N 023°26′17″E

- Jokioisten Museorautatie
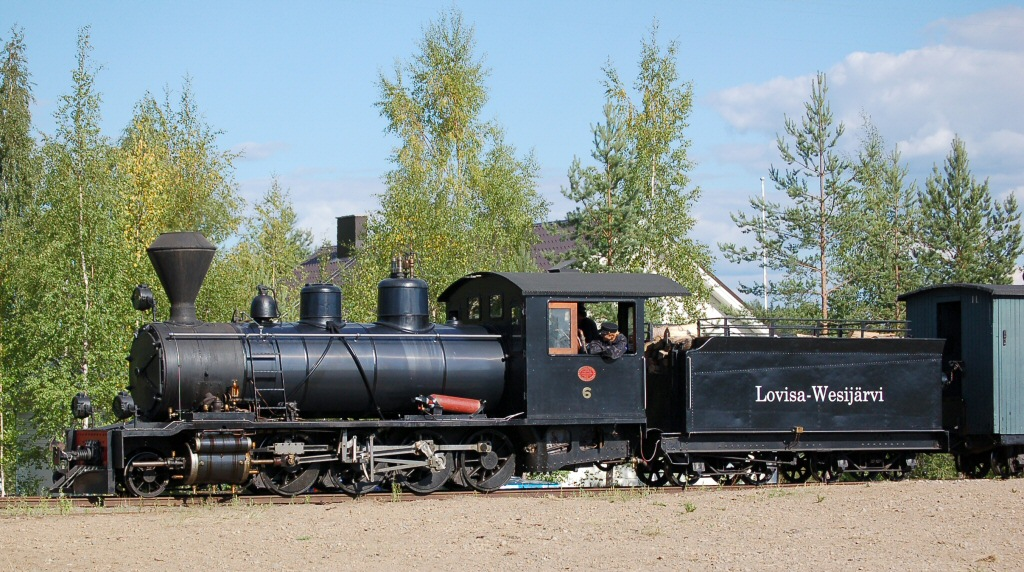
- Lovisa & Wesijärvi Railway #6 (a 2-8-0 built in 1909) at Minkiö station

Overview
- Headquarters: Minkiö
- Reporting mark: JMR
- Locale: Jokioinen and Humppila, Finland
- Dates of operation: 1978–present
- Predecessor: Jokioinen Railway

Technical
- Track gauge: 750 mm (2 ft 5 1/2 in)
- Length: 14 km (8.7 mi)

The Jokioinen Museum Railway (Finnish: Jokioisten Museorautatie) is a heritage railway running between Jokioinen and Humppila in Finland. It is located on part of the route of the last commercially operating narrow gauge railway in Finland, the 750 mm (2 ft 5 1/2 in) gauge Jokioinen Railway.

== History ==
In August 1971 the Friends of the Locomotive Society (Finnish: Veturien Ystävät r.y.) began operating steam-hauled passenger trains at weekends on the Jokioinen Railway, which at that time was still open for commercial freight traffic. The closure of the railway on 1 April 1974 ended the operation of these trains. An attempt was made to take over the entire line as a heritage railway but this was not possible.

The museum was finally established on 2 February 1978, four years after the closure of the commercially-operated railway, when the new Jokioinen Museum Railway Limited joint stock company (Finnish: Jokioisten Museorautatie Oy) bought the rail line from Jokioinen railway station to Minkiö railway station, with its land and associated buildings. Museum steam trains began running on this section on 25 June 1978, and in 1994 the line was extended 8 km (5.0 mi) from Minkiö back to Humppila.

== Route ==
The museum railway station at Humppila is beside the station on the Turku-Toijala line, operated by VR, providing a convenient access to the museum.

Minkiö station has a narrow gauge museum with a collection of carriages and locomotives.

== Gallery ==
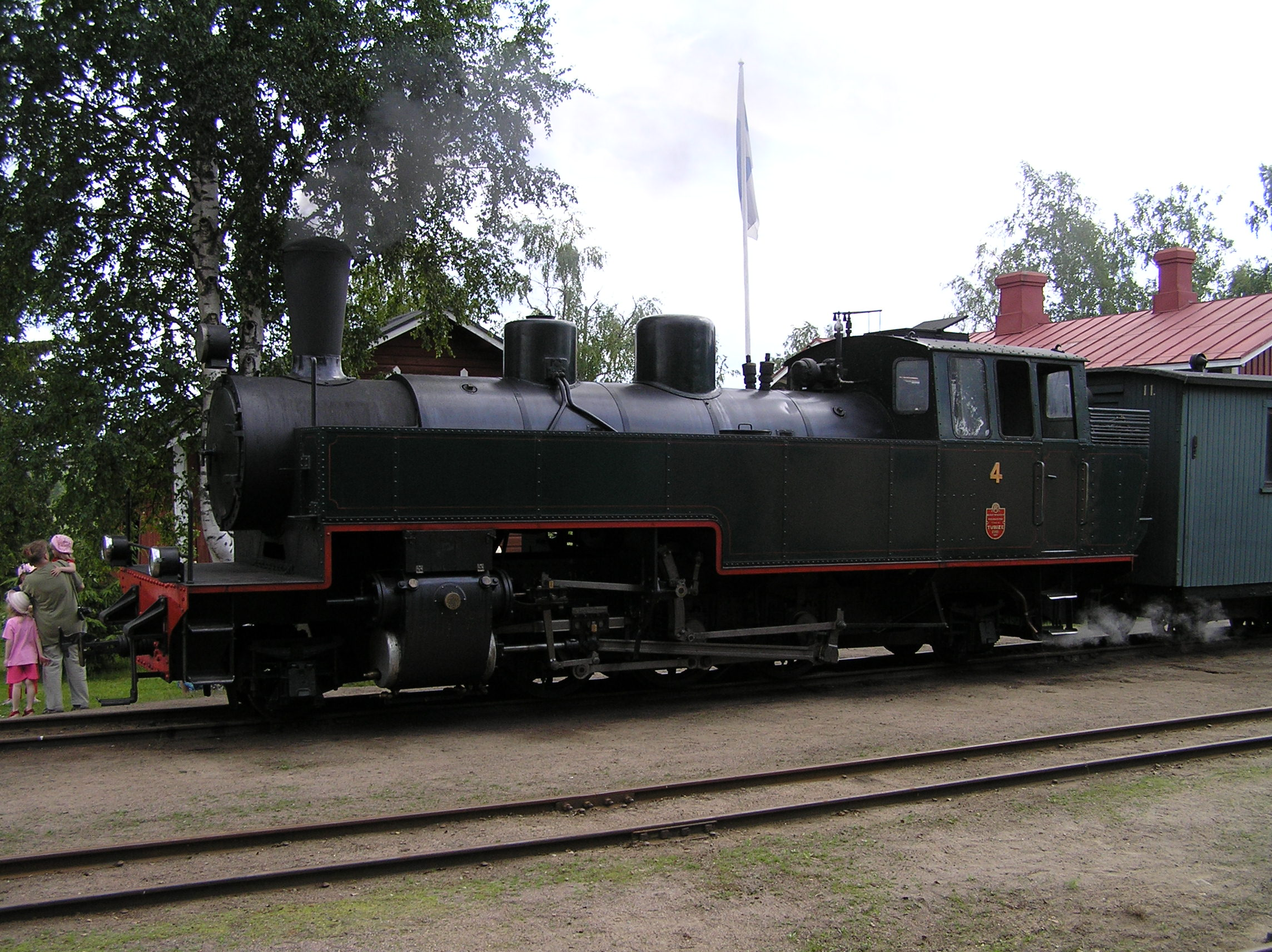
A 2-6-2T built at Tubize works in Belgium in 1947

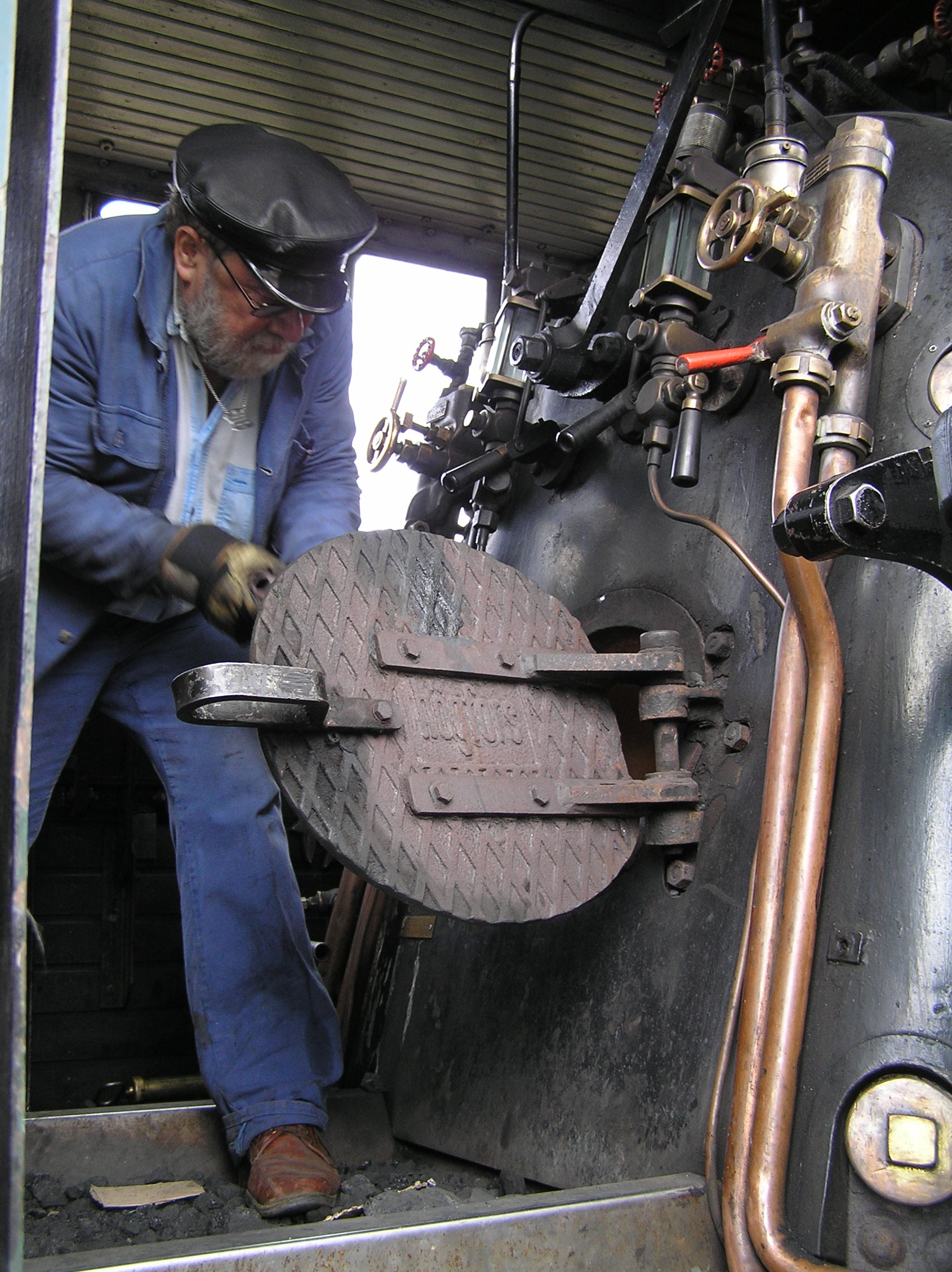
Driver firing a 2-6-2T built at Tubize works in Belgium in 1947

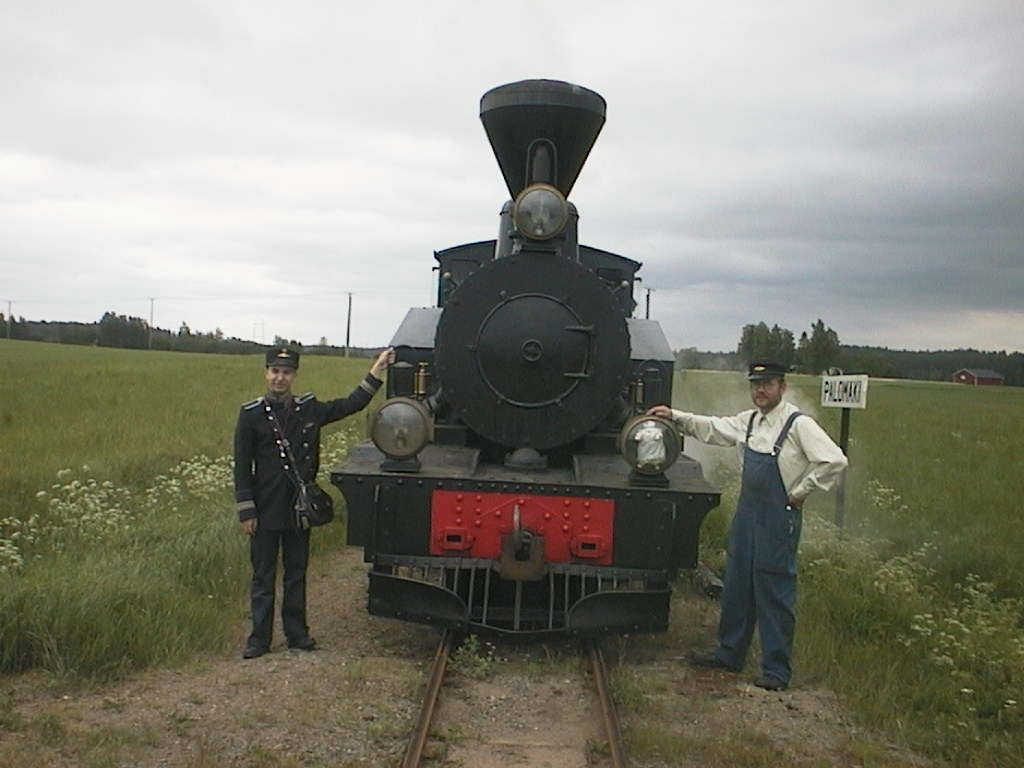
HKR5 locomotive (ex. Hyvinkää–Karkkila Railway) at Raemäki halt.

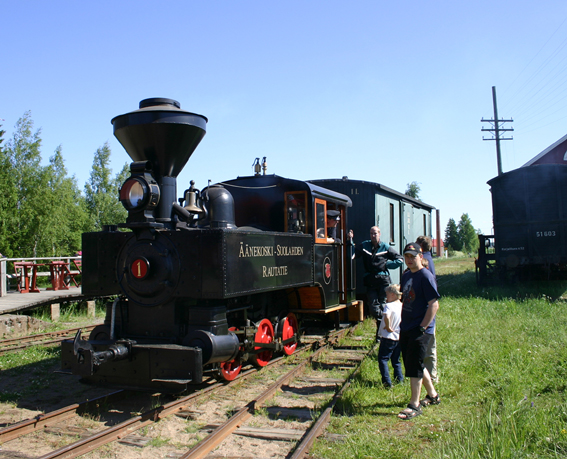
Porter engine (builder: H.K. Porter, 1901, no. 2313, gauge: 750 mm)

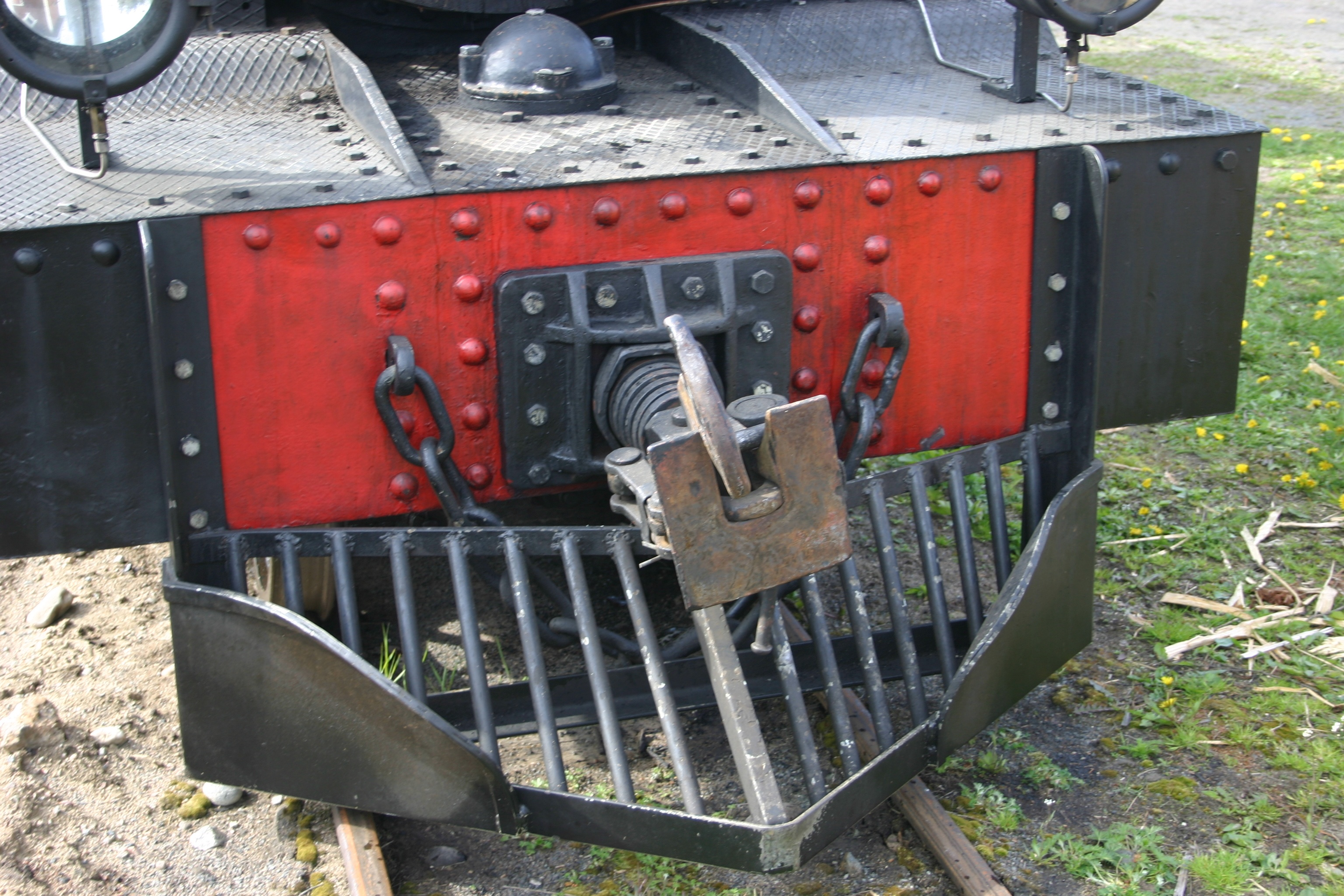
Obstruction clearing device ("Cow catcher") on narrow gauge locomotive LWR6

== See also ==
- History of rail transport in Finland
- Narrow-gauge railways in Finland
- List of heritage railways
