= Myllyoja =

District in Oulu, Finland

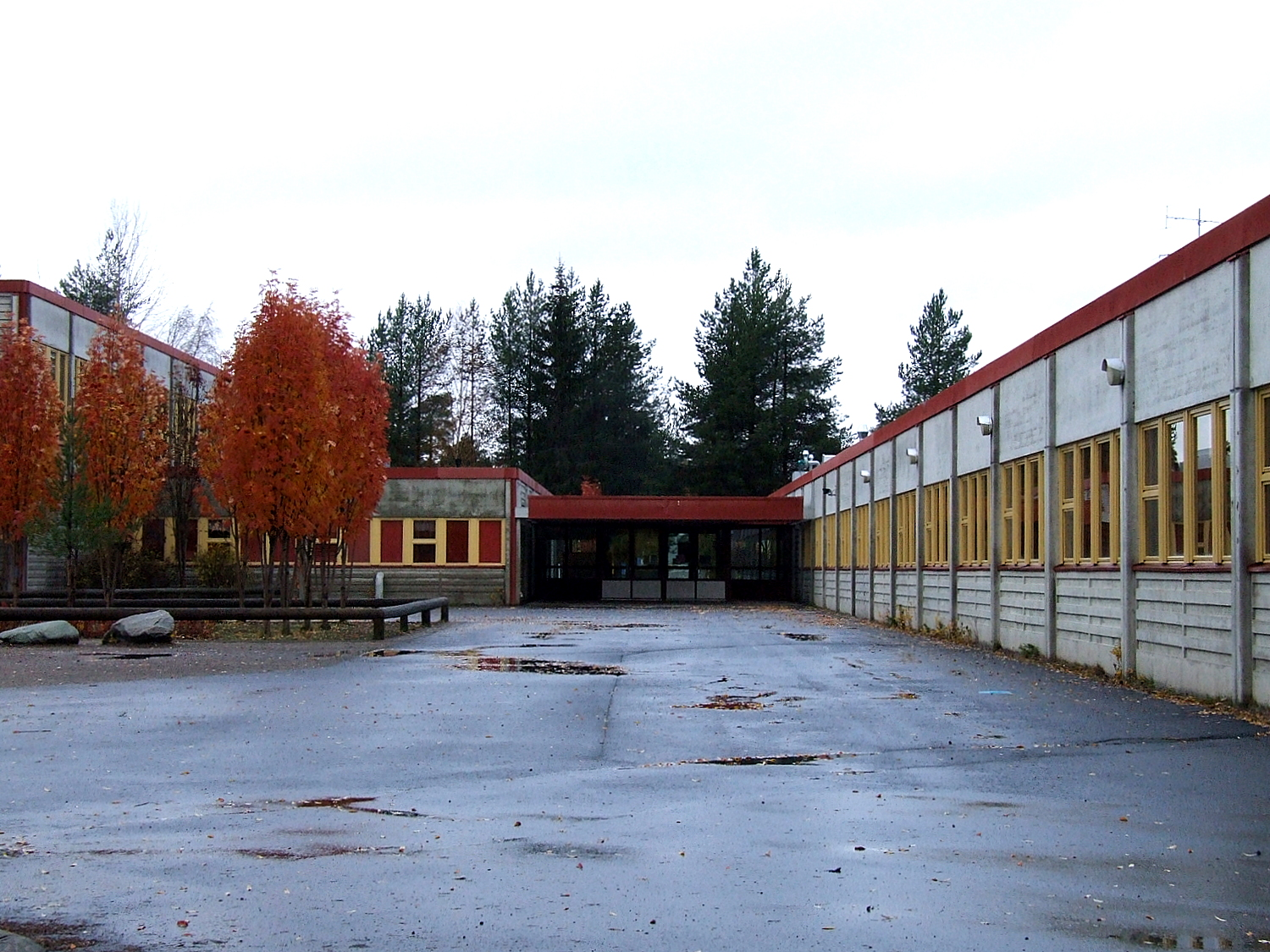

Myllyoja is a district in Oulu, Finland. It has currently about 2,600 inhabitants, and there are around 9,800 inhabitants in the greater Myllyoja area that consists of Myllyoja and its neighbouring districts. Myllyoja has been named after the ditch that separates it from Kirkkokangas district. Myllyoja literally means "millditch".

Services in Myllyoja are centered in Karvarinaukio, a small plaza, that has a restaurant, a library, grocery stores, an elementary school, and a creche. Although Myllyoja in general is a peaceful area, the plaza is sometimes considered to be a somewhat restless area during the night, as it's a popular spot for teenagers. The apartments next to the plaza also house very low income residents.

Most of the homes in Myllyoja are wooden detached houses, but there are also much reconditioned blocks of flats that were built after the Second World War, and terraced houses.

== Climate ==
Myllyoja has a subarctic climate with cold, snowy winters and short, warm summers. Average annual temperature is 2 °C (36 °F). The average annual precipitation is 433 mm (17.05 in) falling on 98 days a year, mostly in late summer and fall.

Climate data for Oulu, Finland
Month	Jan	Feb	Mar	Apr	May	Jun	Jul	Aug	Sep	Oct	Nov	Dec	Year
Mean daily maximum °C (°F)	−6 (21)	−5.7 (21.7)	−0.9 (30.4)	5.6 (42.1)	12.5 (54.5)	17.9 (64.2)	21.1 (70.0)	18.5 (65.3)	12.5 (54.5)	5.8 (42.4)	−0.4 (31.3)	−4 (25)	6.4 (43.5)
Daily mean °C (°F)	−9.6 (14.7)	−9.3 (15.3)	−4.8 (23.4)	1.4 (34.5)	7.8 (46.0)	13.5 (56.3)	16.8 (62.2)	14.3 (57.7)	8.9 (48.0)	3.3 (37.9)	−2.8 (27.0)	−8.2 (17.2)	2.6 (36.7)
Mean daily minimum °C (°F)	−15.4 (4.3)	−14.7 (5.5)	−10.1 (13.8)	−3.4 (25.9)	2.8 (37.0)	8.8 (47.8)	11.4 (52.5)	9.5 (49.1)	4.9 (40.8)	0.3 (32.5)	−5.9 (21.4)	−12.1 (10.2)	−2.0 (28.4)
Average precipitation mm (inches)	26 (1.0)	21 (0.8)	23 (0.9)	19 (0.7)	30 (1.2)	43 (1.7)	57 (2.2)	65 (2.6)	48 (1.9)	42 (1.7)	31 (1.2)	28 (1.1)	433 (17)
Average precipitation days	8	7	6	6	7	8	9	10	10	9	9	9	98
Mean monthly sunshine hours	18.6	65.0	127.1	189.0	266.6	288.0	285.2	204.6	126.0	74.4	27.0	6.2	1,677.7
Source: Hong Kong Observatory,

== Things to do ==
In the summertime, people spend much time at Tervaranta-beach, swimming in the river and getting tanned. Because the beach is steep, children may go snow sliding there in winter if the river is frozen. Local sport field attracts people to play football or pesäpallo.

Cycle- and footpaths are good, and thus, some people like to go cycling or jogging.

== Bordering Districts ==
- Värttö
- Kirkkokangas
- Parkkisenkangas
- Haapalehto
