= Jokioinen Railway =

Narrow-gauge railway in Finland

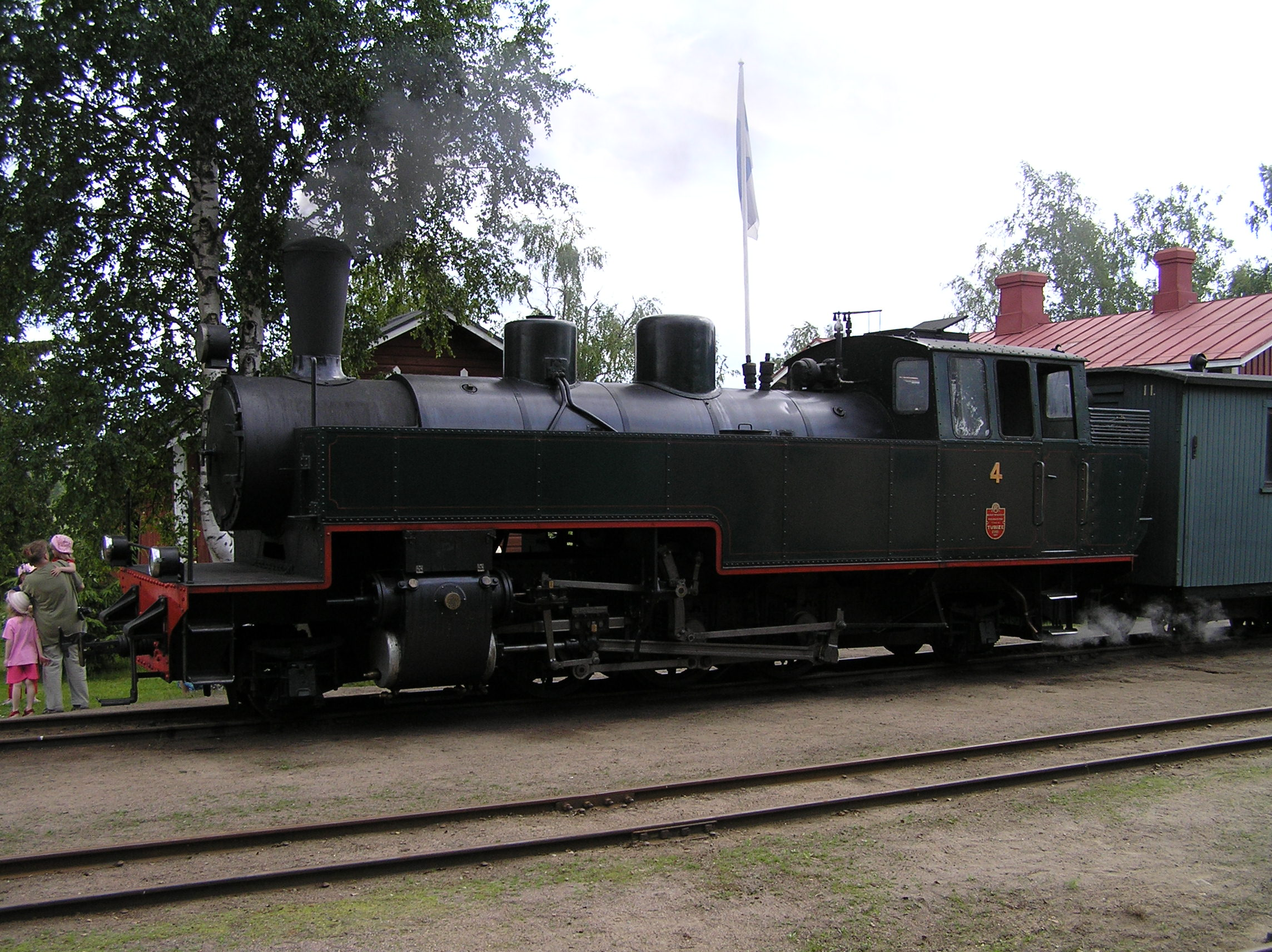
Steam locomotive No 4, a 2-6-2T built at Tubize in Belgium in 1947

The Jokioinen Railway (Finnish: Jokioisten rautatie, Jokioisten-Forssan rautatie, JR) was a 750-millimetre (2 ft 6 in) gauge railway running 23 kilometres (14 mi) from the Finnish State Railways station at Humppila via Jokioinen to Forssa. Part of the line is now the Jokioinen Museum Railway.

The line opened for temporary traffic on December 9, 1898. On October 25 1899, the railway began permanent passenger and freight services. It was the second privately owned narrow gauge railway opened for common carrier services in Finland. In Forssa an electric railway of Forssa Oy connected with the Jokioinen Railway.

== Motive power ==
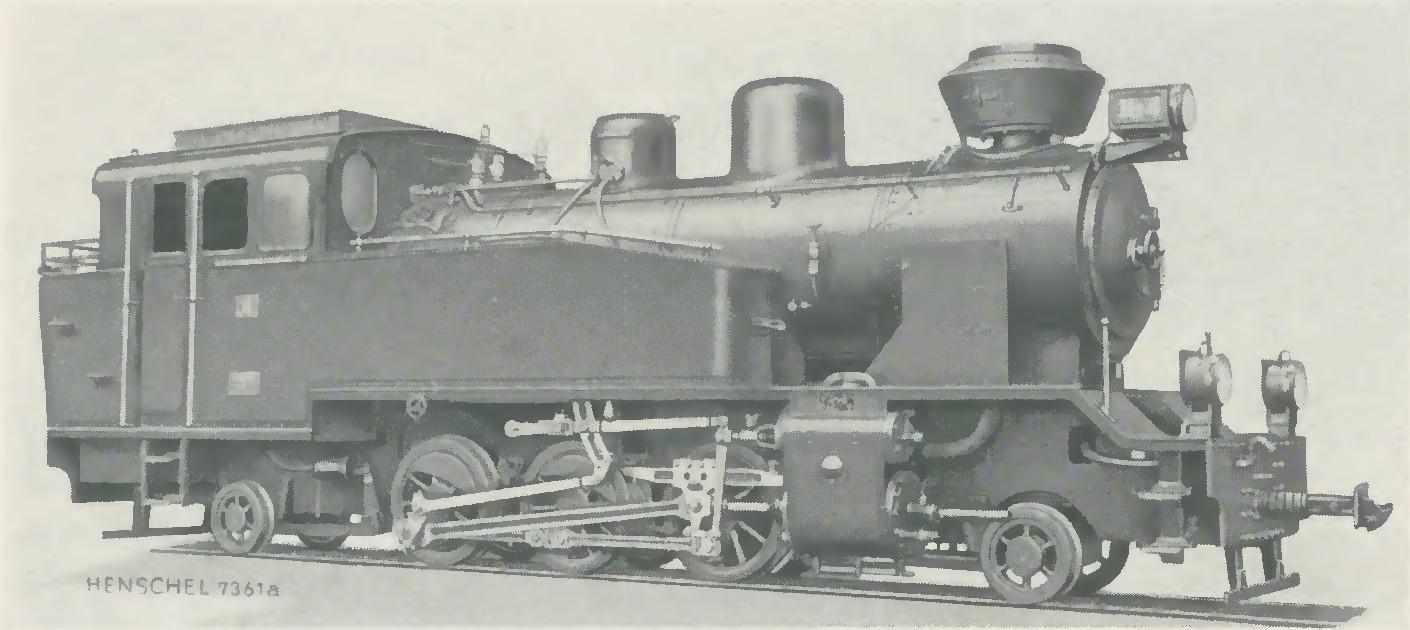
Henschel locomotive

The original motive power of the Jokioinen Railway was two American tank steam locomotives (Nos. 1 and 2) which were built in 1897 by H. K. Porter in Pittsburgh, Pennsylvania. These locomotives were in operation for over 50 years until 1948. In 1900, the Railway bought another American steam locomotive from the Baldwin Locomotive Works, and it was given number 3. This locomotive was soon found to be too heavy for the light 17 kg/m rails of the railway, and it was sold to Estonia. In 1922 the railway purchased a small tank locomotive built by Lokomo in Tampere, Finland and in 1937 it bought a large 2-6-2T tank locomotive built by Henschel in Kassel, Germany. This locomotive had to be given to the Soviet Union as a penalty fee for late war reparation payments in 1945. To replace the Henschel lost to the Soviet Union, the railway ordered two new 2-6-2T locomotives from Ateliers de Tubize in Belgium. These locomotives were delivered in 1947 and 1948 and given numbers 4 and 5.

During the 1950s and 1960s, the last years of the railway, trains were powered by a roster of four diesel locomotives. These locomotives were Move 21 models, manufactured by Valmet Airplane factory in Tampere, Finland. Originally, this type of locomotive was meant as a war payment to Soviet Union.

== Passenger traffic ==
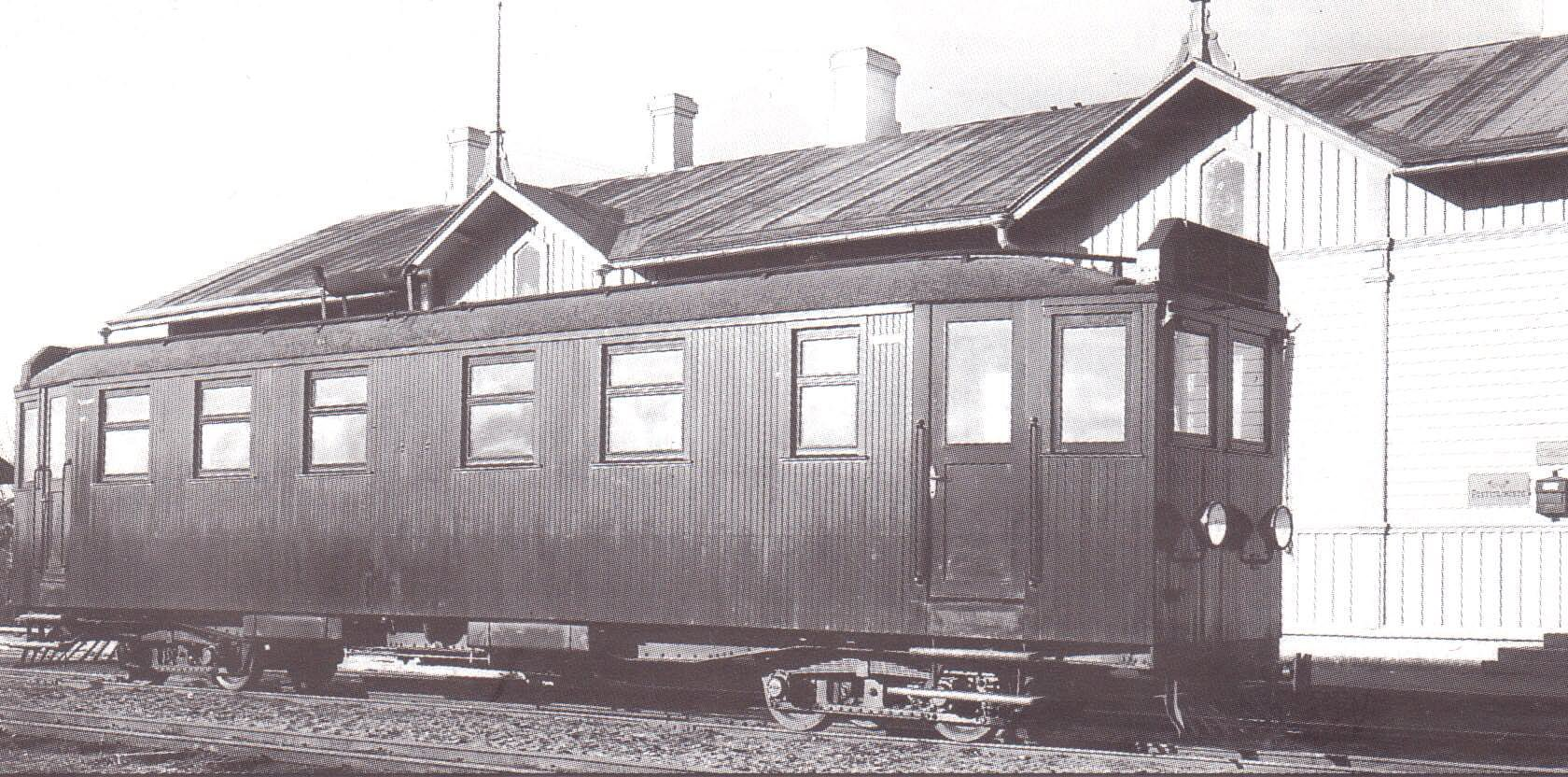
The railway's second railcar

Beginning in the 1930s, all passenger traffic on the Jokioinen Railway was carried in railcars. Two railcars ran on the Jokioinen Railway. The first railcar ran from 1930 to 1932 and the second ran from 1932 to 1942.

The railway had three passenger coaches. These coaches were built by Hietalahti Shipyard in Helsinki on top of frames and trucks manufactured by Leeds Forge Company in England.

== Freight traffic ==
The Jokioinen Railway had a total of about one hundred freight cars. Most of these were manufactured at the end of the 1800s in England and Finland and were in use throughout the time the railway operated, from 1898 to 1974. In 1960 more freight cars were bought from the Loviisa–Vesijärvi railway when it was re-gauged to broad gauge

Freight was the principal traffic on the railway from the very beginning until its closure. Originally the railway was built to serve the needs of the expanding industries in Jokioinen and Forssa. The best year for freight traffic was 1940, during the short peace between the Winter War and the Continuation War, when a total of 90,000 tons of freight was carried on the Railway. The top year for passenger traffic was just after the Wars in 1945, when an annual total of 402,254 passengers was carried on the railway.

== Decline ==
In the 1940s, the Jokioinen Railway faced growing competition from increasing road traffic. The war had slowed this competition down, but within 10 years passenger traffic had ended. The last passenger trains were withdrawn on 31 August 1954 and the railway started to use highway buses for its passenger services.

Freight service continued for another 20 years. The Jokioinen Railway used transporter wagons to carry broad (1,524 mm or 5 ft 0 in) gauge VR freight cars from the 1930s until the end of services on the railway. This avoided the slow and expensive transfer of freight at Humppila and allowed the Jokioinen Railway to stay competitive much longer than other narrow gauge railways in Finland.

By the end of the 1960s, however, the railway began to show signs of old age and wear. The track and the rolling stock were almost all more than 70 years old and large investments would have been needed to compete against the growing automobile and truck use, but the railway's owners were no longer willing to invest any more money in it.

The last revenue freight train of the Jokioinen Railway ran on 29 March 1974. In the same year the section of railway between Forssa and Jokioinen was torn up and in 1975 the line between Minkiö and Humppila was also lifted. The remaining 6 km (3.7 mi) section from Minkiö to Jokioinen was taken over by the Jokioinen Museum Railway, which opened on 25 August 1978 and has since been extended by rebuilding the line from Minkiö to Humppila.

== See also ==
Narrow-gauge railways in Finland
