= Utajärvi =

- Municipality
- Utajärven kunta Utajärvi kommun
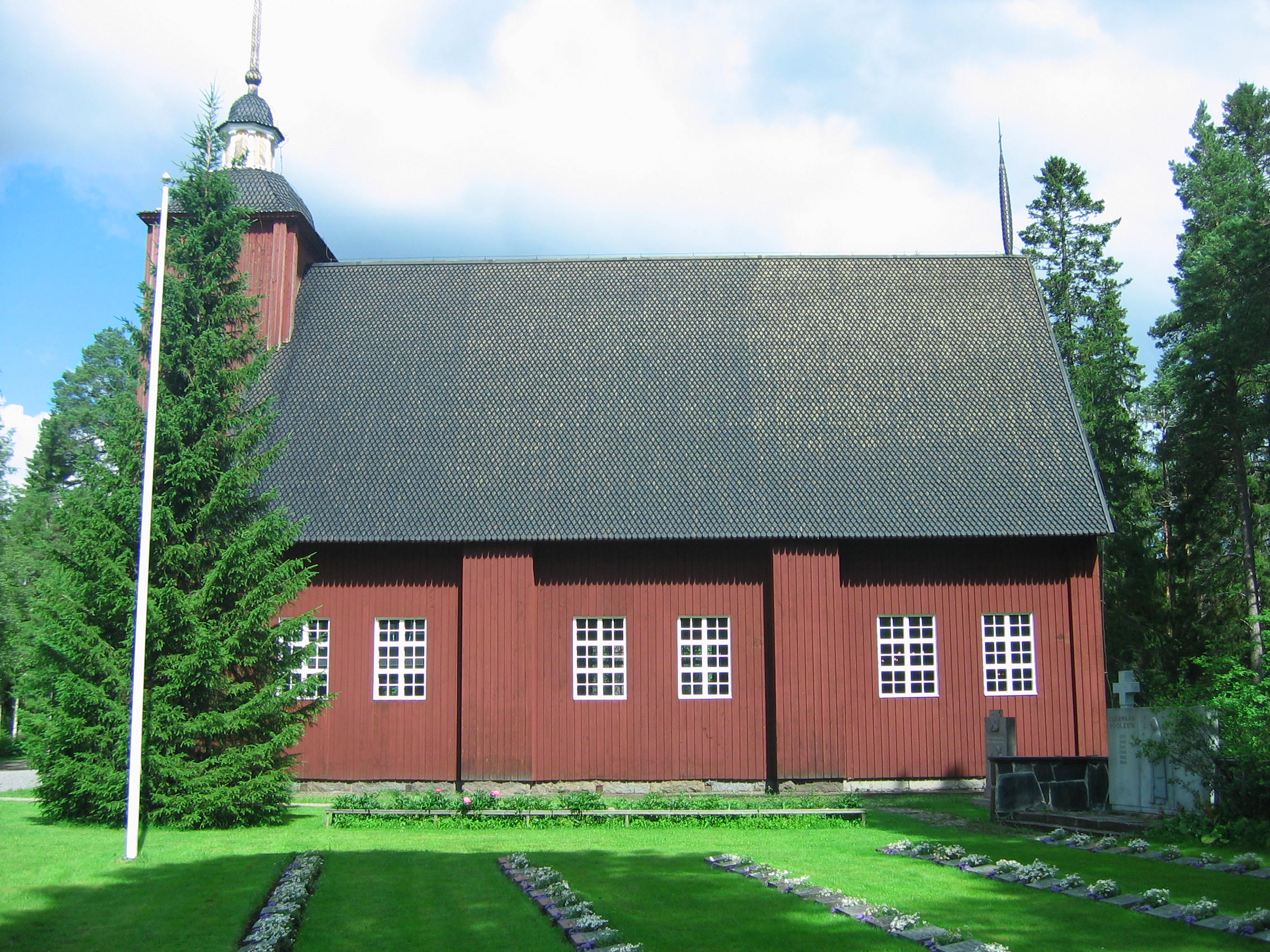
- Utajärvi Church

- Coat of arms

- Location of Utajärvi in Finland
- Interactive map of Utajärvi
- Coordinates: 64°45′N 026°25′E
- Country: Finland
- Region: North Ostrobothnia
- Sub-region: Oulunkaari
- Charter: 1865

Government
  - Municipality manager: Kyösti Juujärvi

Area (2018-01-01)
  - Total: 1,736.73 km^{2} (670.56 sq mi)
  - Land: 1,669.46 km^{2} (644.58 sq mi)
  - Water: 65.55 km^{2} (25.31 sq mi)
  - Rank: 37th largest in Finland

Population (2025-12-31)
  - Total: 2,399
  - Rank: 235th largest in Finland
  - Density: 1.44/km^{2} (3.7/sq mi)

Population by native language
  - Finnish: 98% (official)
  - Others: 2%

Population by age
  - 0 to 14: 14.7%
  - 15 to 64: 53.5%
  - 65 or older: 31.8%
- Time zone: UTC+02:00 (EET)
  - Summer (DST): UTC+03:00 (EEST)
- Website: www.utajarvi.fi

Utajärvi (Finnish pronunciation: [ˈutɑˌjærʋi]) is a municipality of Finland. It is located in the Northern Ostrobothnia region next to the border of the Kainuu region, and is part of the former province of Oulu. It is 58 kilometres (36 mi) from Utajärvi to Oulu and 125 kilometres (78 mi) to Kajaani. The municipality has a population of 2,399 (31 December 2025) and covers an area of 1,736.73 square kilometres (670.56 sq mi) of which 65.55 km^{2} (25.31 sq mi) is water. The population density is 1.44 inhabitants per square kilometre (3.7/sq mi). The municipality is unilingually Finnish.

The municipality is probably best known for the moraine region of Rokua, which is a popular summer and sports resort.

The popular rockgroup 22-Pistepirkko was formed in Utajärvi in 1980.

== See also ==
- Finnish national road 22
