= Jokioinen =

Jokioinen Jockis
- Municipality
- Jokioisten kunta Jockis kommun
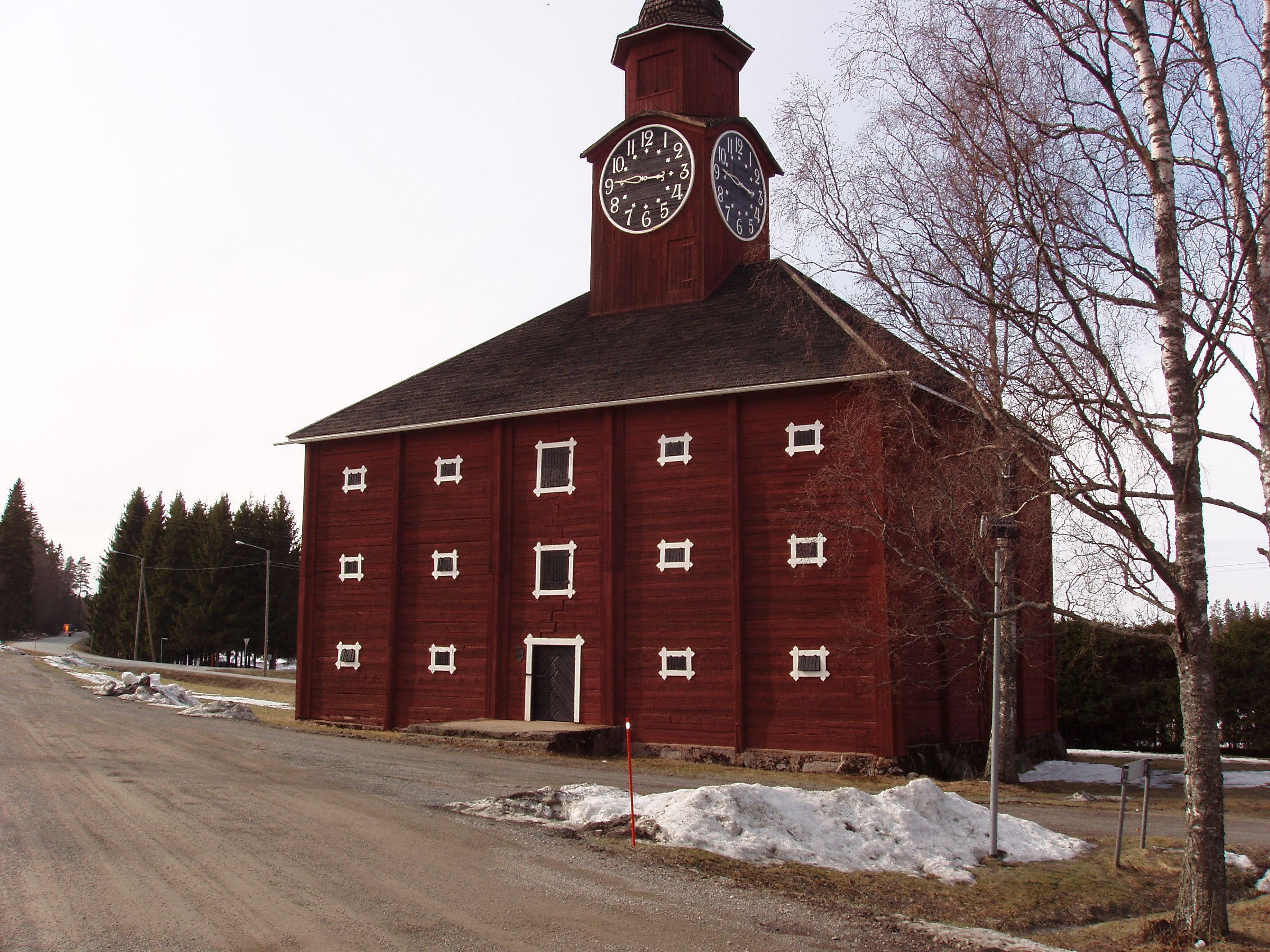
- The grain storehouse with bell tower of Jokioinen Estates

- Flag Coat of arms

- Location of Jokioinen in Finland
- Interactive map of Jokioinen
- Coordinates: 60°48′N 023°29′E
- Country: Finland
- Region: Kanta-Häme
- Sub-region: Forssa
- Charter: 1873

Government
  - Municipal manager: Jukka Matilainen

Area (2018-01-01)
  - Total: 181.94 km^{2} (70.25 sq mi)
  - Land: 180.42 km^{2} (69.66 sq mi)
  - Water: 1.52 km^{2} (0.59 sq mi)
  - Rank: 270th largest in Finland

Population (2025-12-31)
  - Total: 4,795
  - Rank: 169th largest in Finland
  - Density: 26.58/km^{2} (68.8/sq mi)

Population by native language
  - Finnish: 96.1% (official)
  - Swedish: 0.4%
  - Others: 3.6%

Population by age
  - 0 to 14: 14.7%
  - 15 to 64: 58.2%
  - 65 or older: 27.1%
- Time zone: UTC+02:00 (EET)
  - Summer (DST): UTC+03:00 (EEST)
- Climate: Dfc
- Website: www.jokioinen.fi/in-english/

Jokioinen (Finnish: [ˈjokioi̯nen]; Swedish: Jockis) is a municipality of Finland. It is located in the Kanta-Häme region. The municipality has a population of 4,795 (31 December 2025) and covers an area of 181.94 square kilometres (70.25 sq mi) of which 1.52 km^{2} (0.59 sq mi) is water. The population density is 26.58 inhabitants per square kilometre (68.8/sq mi). The municipality is unilingually Finnish.

A notable tourist attraction in the region is the Jokioinen Museum Railway. Jokioinen is also home to a Tibetan Buddhist stupa, which is the largest Buddhist shrine in the country.

The ear of wheat in the coat of arms refers to the importance that Jokioinen Manor has had in the development of Finnish agriculture, and the anvil refers to the local ironworks. The coat of arms was designed by Gustaf von Numers, and the Jokioinen Municipal Council approved it at its meeting on 30 July 1951. The Ministry of the Interior confirmed the coat of arms for use on 21 September of the same year.

== History ==
The history of Jokioinen is tightly connected to the Jokioinen estate, which was established in 1562. The estate developed into the largest estate in Finland during the time of the provincial governor Ernst Gustaf von Willebrand. At the beginning of 20th century the estate had a corn mill, saw mill, a brick factory, steel plant and a sugar and syrup factory.

Due to the crofters law of 1918 and the land reform law of 1945 the estate was split into more than 1500 homes and small farms. The rest of the estate was transferred to the ownership of the Finnish state in 1918. In 1928 the Department of Finnish Plant Breeding from Tikkurila and in 1957 the observatory from Pasila were transferred to the Jokioinen estate.

== Climate ==
Jokioinen has a humid continental climate of the warm-summer type (Köppen: Dfb), typical of the South Finnish fringe. In the past it falls to the continental subarctic zone (Dfc, based in old data) with only 3 months above 10 °C. The conditions are similar to Tampere, although it is more than 70 km to the north which shows influence of the urbanization in the climate.

Climate data for Jokioinen Ilmala (1991–2020 normals, extremes 1959–present)
Month	Jan	Feb	Mar	Apr	May	Jun	Jul	Aug	Sep	Oct	Nov	Dec	Year
Record high °C (°F)	8.2 (46.8)	9.4 (48.9)	16.3 (61.3)	23.5 (74.3)	29.2 (84.6)	32.1 (89.8)	32.3 (90.1)	31.8 (89.2)	27.6 (81.7)	18.4 (65.1)	13.3 (55.9)	10.8 (51.4)	32.3 (90.1)
Mean maximum °C (°F)	4.2 (39.6)	4.0 (39.2)	9.2 (48.6)	17.9 (64.2)	24.7 (76.5)	26.6 (79.9)	28.1 (82.6)	27.1 (80.8)	21.7 (71.1)	14.3 (57.7)	8.8 (47.8)	5.3 (41.5)	29.2 (84.6)
Mean daily maximum °C (°F)	−2.1 (28.2)	−2.0 (28.4)	2.0 (35.6)	9.0 (48.2)	15.8 (60.4)	19.7 (67.5)	22.1 (71.8)	20.8 (69.4)	15.3 (59.5)	8.0 (46.4)	2.7 (36.9)	0.0 (32.0)	9.3 (48.7)
Daily mean °C (°F)	−4.8 (23.4)	−5.4 (22.3)	−1.9 (28.6)	3.9 (39.0)	10.0 (50.0)	14.3 (57.7)	17.0 (62.6)	15.5 (59.9)	10.6 (51.1)	4.9 (40.8)	0.7 (33.3)	−2.6 (27.3)	5.2 (41.3)
Mean daily minimum °C (°F)	−7.8 (18.0)	−8.3 (17.1)	−5.8 (21.6)	−0.8 (30.6)	3.9 (39.0)	8.7 (47.7)	11.4 (52.5)	10.5 (50.9)	6.4 (43.5)	2.0 (35.6)	−1.6 (29.1)	−4.8 (23.4)	1.1 (34.1)
Mean minimum °C (°F)	−22.5 (−8.5)	−21.7 (−7.1)	−17.0 (1.4)	−7.7 (18.1)	−3.2 (26.2)	1.8 (35.2)	5.6 (42.1)	3.5 (38.3)	−1.7 (28.9)	−7.0 (19.4)	−11.3 (11.7)	−17.2 (1.0)	−25.8 (−14.4)
Record low °C (°F)	−36.7 (−34.1)	−39.3 (−38.7)	−29.0 (−20.2)	−20.9 (−5.6)	−7.0 (19.4)	−3.1 (26.4)	0.8 (33.4)	−1.5 (29.3)	−8.8 (16.2)	−16.4 (2.5)	−24.5 (−12.1)	−33.4 (−28.1)	−39.3 (−38.7)
Average precipitation mm (inches)	47 (1.9)	35 (1.4)	31 (1.2)	32 (1.3)	38 (1.5)	68 (2.7)	74 (2.9)	72 (2.8)	54 (2.1)	63 (2.5)	56 (2.2)	51 (2.0)	621 (24.5)
Average precipitation days (≥ 1.0 mm)	11	9	8	8	7	10	10	10	9	11	11	12	116
Average relative humidity (%)	91	89	81	72	66	70	74	78	84	89	93	93	82
Mean monthly sunshine hours	36	68	144	190	259	259	264	214	140	77	28	22	1,699
Source 1: FMI normals 1991–2020
Source 2: Record highs and lows 1959–present

Climate data for Jokioinen (Hakala), elevation: 103 m or 338 ft, 1961–1990 normals and extremes
Month	Jan	Feb	Mar	Apr	May	Jun	Jul	Aug	Sep	Oct	Nov	Dec	Year
Record high °C (°F)	7.4 (45.3)	9.4 (48.9)	14.0 (57.2)	21.2 (70.2)	27.7 (81.9)	31.5 (88.7)	29.9 (85.8)	30.4 (86.7)	27.6 (81.7)	18.4 (65.1)	11.3 (52.3)	7.2 (45.0)	31.5 (88.7)
Mean daily maximum °C (°F)	−4.6 (23.7)	−4.1 (24.6)	0.4 (32.7)	6.8 (44.2)	15.0 (59.0)	19.7 (67.5)	20.9 (69.6)	19.1 (66.4)	13.4 (56.1)	7.7 (45.9)	1.7 (35.1)	−2.2 (28.0)	7.8 (46.1)
Daily mean °C (°F)	−7.5 (18.5)	−7.4 (18.7)	−3.5 (25.7)	2.4 (36.3)	9.4 (48.9)	14.3 (57.7)	15.8 (60.4)	14.2 (57.6)	9.4 (48.9)	4.7 (40.5)	−0.4 (31.3)	−4.9 (23.2)	3.9 (39.0)
Mean daily minimum °C (°F)	−11.2 (11.8)	−11.2 (11.8)	−7.7 (18.1)	−1.8 (28.8)	3.2 (37.8)	7.9 (46.2)	10.3 (50.5)	9.4 (48.9)	5.6 (42.1)	1.8 (35.2)	−3.0 (26.6)	−8.1 (17.4)	−0.4 (31.3)
Record low °C (°F)	−36.7 (−34.1)	−39.3 (−38.7)	−29.0 (−20.2)	−20.9 (−5.6)	−7.0 (19.4)	−3.1 (26.4)	0.8 (33.4)	−1.5 (29.3)	−8.8 (16.2)	−13.4 (7.9)	−24.5 (−12.1)	−33.4 (−28.1)	−39.3 (−38.7)
Average precipitation mm (inches)	36.0 (1.42)	24.0 (0.94)	25.0 (0.98)	32.0 (1.26)	35.0 (1.38)	47.0 (1.85)	80.0 (3.15)	83.0 (3.27)	65.0 (2.56)	58.0 (2.28)	55.0 (2.17)	42.0 (1.65)	582 (22.91)
Average precipitation days (≥ 1.0 mm)	9.0	7.0	8.0	7.0	7.0	8.0	10.0	11.0	10.0	11.0	11.0	10.0	109
Mean monthly sunshine hours	36.6	70.5	133.0	174.4	252.1	276.4	247.2	203.6	125.0	81.2	35.4	27.3	1,662.7
Source: NOAA

== Economy ==
Employment structure of Jokioinen by trade at the end of 2004 was following: Services 64.9%, processing 23.3%, agriculture and forestry economics 9.6%.

=== Major employers ===
- MTT Agrifood Research Finland: 480
- Jokioinen municipality: 305
- Boreal Plant Breeding Ltd: 68
- Jokioisten Leipä Oy (bakery): 45
- Suomen Sokeri Oy Finnsugar (sugar mill): 44

== Villages ==
Haapaniemi, Jokioinen, Jänhijoki, Kiipu, Lammi, Latovainio, Minkiö, Minkiön asema (Minkiö railway station), Niemi, Ojainen, Pellilä, Saari, and Vaulammi

== Notable people ==
- Karl Fazer (1866–1932), chocolatier and sport shooter
- Anneli Saaristo (born 1949), singer
- Miina Sillanpää (1866–1952), politician
