= VR commuter rail lines =

List of lines on the VR commuter rail system in Finland

The Helsinki commuter rail system comprises four local and four regional services, each of which are identified by letters of the alphabet.

Letters have been used as service identifiers since 1972. This was originally inspired by the Copenhagen S-train system. Unlike Copenhagen, which maintains a strict alphabetical order, letters of Helsinki commuter rail services are often assigned on the basis of mnemonics, such as E for Espoo and K for Kerava, with care taken to ensure that the original letters did not sound or look similar, to avoid confusion. In recent years, however, this rule has been broken, with the Y train to Siuntio and the R train now also serving Tampere.

Commuter train services operate on four railway lines, radiating from the Helsinki Central Station:

- westbound on the Coastal Line (A, E, H, L, U and Y)
- northbound on the Ring Rail Line (I/P, separating from the Main Line after Hiekkaharju station)
- northbound on the Main Line (K)

The VR commuter rail system consists of three local and four interurban services:

- The D and R and T run from Helsinki to Riihimäki, Hämeenlinna (D and R) and Tampere (R), with various stopping patterns.
- The Z runs northbound from Helsinki on the Main Line, but separates on to the Lahti Line to run northeast just after Kerava.
- The M forms Tampere's commuter rail. It runs from Nokia to Tampere, with some services extending to Toijala. As of August 2022, this now runs hourly throughout the day, with roughly two-hourly extensions to Toijala.
- The G runs hourly from Lahti to Riihimäki.
- The O runs mainly from Kotka Port to Kouvola, with some services running between Lahti and Kouvola/Kotka.

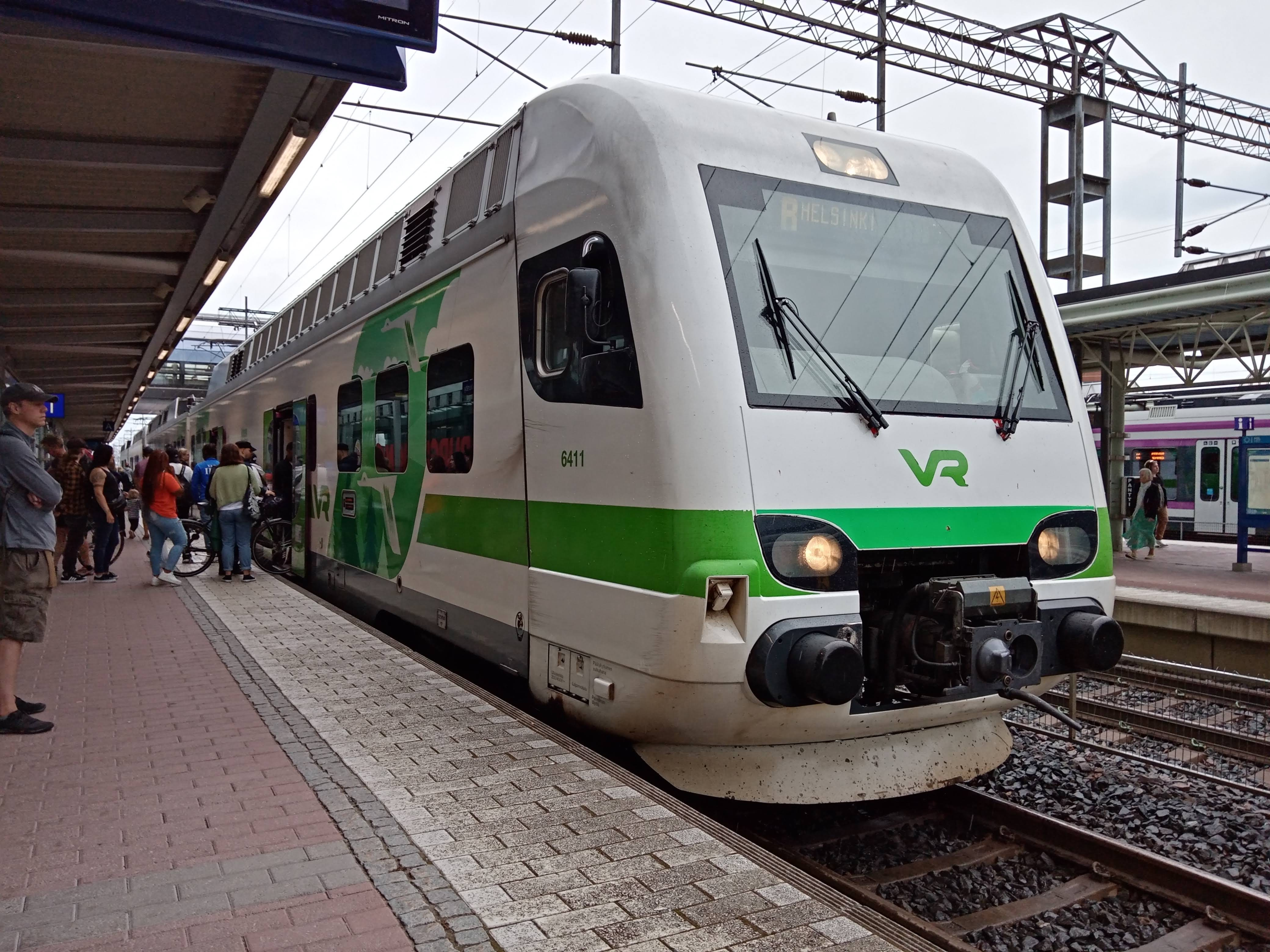
Sm4 units 11+08 pause at Tikkurila with an R train from Tampere to Helsinki.

== Current lines ==
Frequencies are for off-peak only (Monday-Saturday).

Rantarata
Route	Service	tph	Calling at
Helsinki to Kirkkonummi	U	2	Pasila, Huopalahti, Leppävaara, Kilo, Kera, Kauniainen, Koivuhovi, Tuomarila, Espoo, Kauklahti, Masala, Jorvas, Tolsa
Helsinki to Kauklahti	E	2	Pasila, Huopalahti, Leppävaara, Kilo, Kera, Kauniainen, Koivuhovi, Tuomarila, Espoo
Helsinki to Leppävaara	A	6	Pasila, Ilmala, Huopalahti, Valimo, Pitäjänmäki, Mäkkylä
Ring Rail Line
Route	Service	tph	Calling at
Helsinki to Helsinki	I/P	3	Pasila, Ilmala, Huopalahti, Pohjois-Haaga, Kannelmäki, Malminkartano, Myyrmäki, Louhela, Martinlaakso, Vantaankoski, Vehkala, Kivistö, Aviapolis, Lentoasema, Leinelä, Hiekkaharju, Tikkurila, Puistola, Tapanila, Malmi, Pukinmäki, Oulunkylä, Käpylä, Pasila; P trains run clockwise (in the above order), I trains run anti-clockwise (in the reverse order). Both trains run 3 times per hour (every 20 minutes).
Helsinki to Helsinki-Vantaa Airport	I/P	3	Pasila, Ilmala, Huopalahti, Pohjois-Haaga, Kannelmäki, Malminkartano, Myyrmäki, Louhela, Martinlaakso, Vantaankoski, Kivistö, Aviapolis; P trains run clockwise (in the above order), I trains run anti-clockwise (in the reverse order). Both trains run 3 times per hour (every 20 minutes).
Helsinki-Riihimäki railway
Route	Service	tph	Calling at
Helsinki to Riihimäki	R	2	Pasila, Tikkurila, Kerava, Ainola, Saunakallio, Järvenpää, Jokela, Hyvinkää
Helsinki to Kerava	K	3	Pasila, Käpylä, Oulunkylä, Pukinmäki, Malmi, Tapanila, Puistola, Tikkurila, Hiekkaharju, Koivukylä, Rekola, Korso, Savio
Kerava-Lahti railway
Route	Service	tph	Calling at
Helsinki to Lahti	Z	1	Pasila, Tikkurila, Kerava, Haarajoki, Mäntsälä, Henna

== Special lines ==
Special lines are lines that do not run regularly, and are usually not listed (explicitly or even at all) on the HSL/VR map. These include the lines to Siuntio, Kouvola and Tampere.

Rantarata
Route	Service	tpd from Helsinki	tpd to Helsinki	Calling at
Helsinki to Siuntio	Y	4	7	Pasila, Huopalahti, Leppävaara, Espoo, Kauklahti, Masala, Kirkkonummi; Runs roughly hourly during peak hours, with one midday return.
Helsinki to Hanko	H	0.42	0.42	Pasila, Leppävaara, Espoo, Kirkkonummi, Siuntio, Ingå, Karis, Dragsvik, Ekenäs, Skogby, Lappohja, Santala, Hanko-Pohjoinen, Runs once every Wednesday, Friday and Sunday evening.
Helsinki to Siuntio	L	2	1	Pasila, Ilmala, Huopalahti, Valimo, Pitäjänmäki, Mäkkylä, Leppävaara, Kilo, Kera, Kauniainen, Koivuhovi, Tuomarila, Espoo, Kauklahti, Masala, Jorvas, Tolsa, Kirkkonummi; One return at about midnight and one outbound journey very early in the morning, which then becomes a Y train to Helsinki.
Helsinki to Kirkkonummi	L	6	6	Pasila, Ilmala, Huopalahti, Valimo, Pitäjänmäki, Mäkkylä, Leppävaara, Kilo, Kera, Kauniainen, Koivuhovi, Tuomarila, Espoo, Kauklahti, Masala, Jorvas, Tolsa, Kirkkonummi; Runs infrequently during early mornings and late evenings only.
Helsinki-Riihimäki railway	L			
Route	Service	tpd from Helsinki	tpd to Helsinki	Calling at
Helsinki to Hämeenlinna	R	1 (from Riihimäki)	1	Pasila, Tikkurila, Kerava, Ainola, Saunakallio, Järvenpää, Jokela, Hyvinkää, Riihimäki, Ryttylä, Turenki; Forms the morning and is formed of the evening D train to/from Hämeenlinna.
Helsinki to Hämeenlinna	D	1		Pasila, Tikkurila, Kerava, Järvenpää, Hyvinkää, Riihimäki, Ryttylä, Turenki; Runs to Helsinki in the morning peak and from Helsinki in the evening peak.
Helsinki to Tampere	R	10	9	Pasila, Tikkurila, Kerava, Ainola, Saunakallio, Järvenpää, Jokela, Hyvinkää, Riihimäki, Ryttylä, Turenki, Hämeenlinna, Parola, Iittala, Toijala, Viiala, Lempäälä; Services are formed of between 2 and 4 units as far as Riihimäki, where the train length is reduced to 1 or 2 units. In the reverse direction, 1 or 2 units depart Tampere, with between 1 and 3 units added to the front at Riihimäki.
Kerava-Lahti railway
Route	Service	tpd from Helsinki	tpd to Helsinki	Calling at
Helsinki to Kouvola	Z	3	3	Pasila, Tikkurila, Kerava, Haarajoki, Mäntsälä, Henna, Lahti, Villähde, Nastola, Uusikylä, Kausala, Koria

== Lines not terminating in Helsinki ==
These lines have both termini outside of the HSL area and include all lines from the VR commuter rail system.

- The M train runs from Nokia to Tampere and Toijala. It is Tampere's sole commuter rail line.
- The G train runs from Riihimäki to Lahti.
- The O train runs from Lahti to Kouvola/Kotkan satama and Kouvola to Kotkan satama.

Rantarata
Route	Service	tpd from Hanko	tpd to Hanko	Calling at
Karis to Hanko	H	6/7	6/7	Dragsvik, Ekenäs, Skogby, Lappohja, Santala, Hanko-Pohjoinen
Riihimäki-Saint Petersburg railway
Route	Service	tpd from Lahti	tpd to Lahti	Calling at
Riihimäki to Lahti	G	16	18	Hikiä, Oitti, Mommila, Lappila, Järvelä, Herrala
Kouvola to Lahti	O	2		Koria, Kausala, Uusikylä, Nastola, Villähde
Kotkan satama to Lahti	O	3		Kotka, Paimenportti, Kyminlinna, Kymi, Tavastila, Inkeroinen, Myllykoski, Kouvola, Koria, Kausala, Uusikylä, Nastola, Villähde
Kotkan satama to Kouvola	O	6 (to/from Kouvola)		Kotka, Paimenportti, Kyminlinna, Kymi, Tavastila, Inkeroinen, Myllykoski
Helsinki-Riihimäki railway
Route	Service	tpd from Tampere	tpd to Tampere	Calling at
Riihimäki to Tampere	R	1	0	Ryttylä, Turenki, Hämeenlinna, Parola, Iittala, Toijala, Viiala, Lempäälä
Riihimäki to Nokia	R	2	2	Ryttylä, Turenki, Hämeenlinna, Parola, Iittala, Toijala, Viiala, Lempäälä, Tampere, Tesoma
Tampere–Pori railway
Route	Service	tpd		Calling at
Tampere to Nokia	M	11		Tesoma; 3 services a day are formed of R trains from Helsinki, which run up to Nokia and back in between Tampere to Helsinki runs.
Toijala to Nokia	M	6		Viiala, Lempäälä, Tampere, Tesoma
Toijala to Tampere	M	6		Viiala, Lempäälä
