= Perniö railway station =

Former railway station in Salo, Finland

Perniö Bjärnå
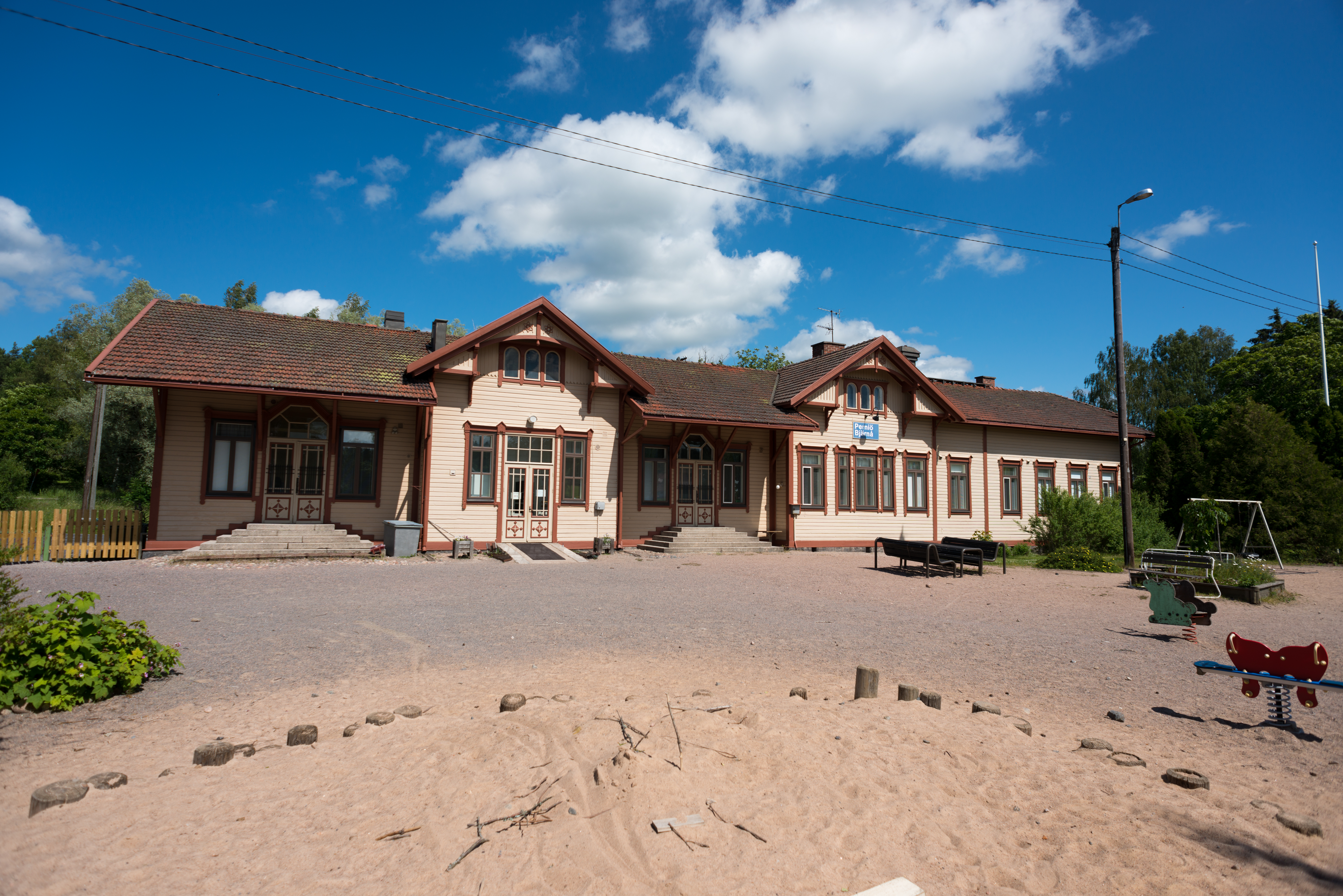
- Perniö in 2012

General information
- Location: Perniön asemanseutu, Salo; Finland
- Coordinates: 60°15.002′N 023°08.691′E
- System: Closed VR station
- Owner: Finnish Transport Infrastructure Agency
- Operator: VR Group
- Line: Helsinki–Turku

Construction
- Architect: Bruno Granholm
- Architectural style: Jugendstil

Other information
- Station code: Pö

History
- Opened: 1 February 1899
- Closed: 1 July 1992
Location

The Perniö railway station (Finnish: Perniön rautatieasema, Swedish: Bjärnå järnvägsstation) is a closed station located in the area of Perniön asemanseutu in the town of Salo (formerly the municipality of Perniö), Finland. It is located along the Helsinki–Turku railway, and the nearest station with passenger services is Salo in the north.

The Finnish Heritage Agency has proclaimed the area of Perniön asemanseutu as a built cultural environment of national significance.

== History ==
The exact location of the Helsinki–Turku railway on the territory of the municipality of Perniö was subject to debate among its locals: while the railway ended up being placed to the east of the Perniö parish village, another option was to have it cut through the village directly. However, the disturbance that would be inevitably caused to the village by passing trains was deemed an issue, and the option ended up being the more expensive out of the two as well. Additionally, the eastern option also allowed the railway to serve the Koski factories, close to the village of Paarskylä, in which the station carrying the name of the Perniö municipality was eventually built.

The first train arrived in Perniö in September 1898, and the line was officially inaugurated on 1 February 1899. The village around the station began growing from the end of the 1890s; the first residences were constructed to the north of the station. The services of the station ended up being used by numerous local factories, and in 1925, the Perniön Maanviljelijäin Kauppa Oy sales company was founded; it constructed a granary and mill, as well as a machinery workshop on the premises of the station. Perniö was notable for its numerous warehouses that belonged to various local factories and wholesalers.

The western end of the rail yard in Perniö posed notable challenges for train traffic; it had a level crossing over the entire rail yard and several sidings, and the railway itself curved strongly in the area. The level crossing was equipped with one of the first warning systems in the country, while the curve was equipped with a greaser in 1961 to extend the longevity of the rails.

Passenger services in Perniö ceased on 29 May 1988, and the station became unstaffed on 1 January 1990. Afterwards, the line of the railway was straightened in the vicinity of Perniö, and the new line was taken into use on 7 June 1992. Both the old and new lines were used in parallel for some time, due to the connection to the granary still being in use at the time. Freight services at the station ended on 1 July 1992, with the operating point being abolished on the same date. This prompted the dismantling of the station's rail yard in 1993.

== Architecture ==
The station building, designed by Bruno Granholm and representative of Jugendstil, was completed in 1898 and received an extension in 1905.
