= Pitäjänmäki railway station =

Railway station in Helsinki, Finland

Pitäjänmäki Sockenbacka
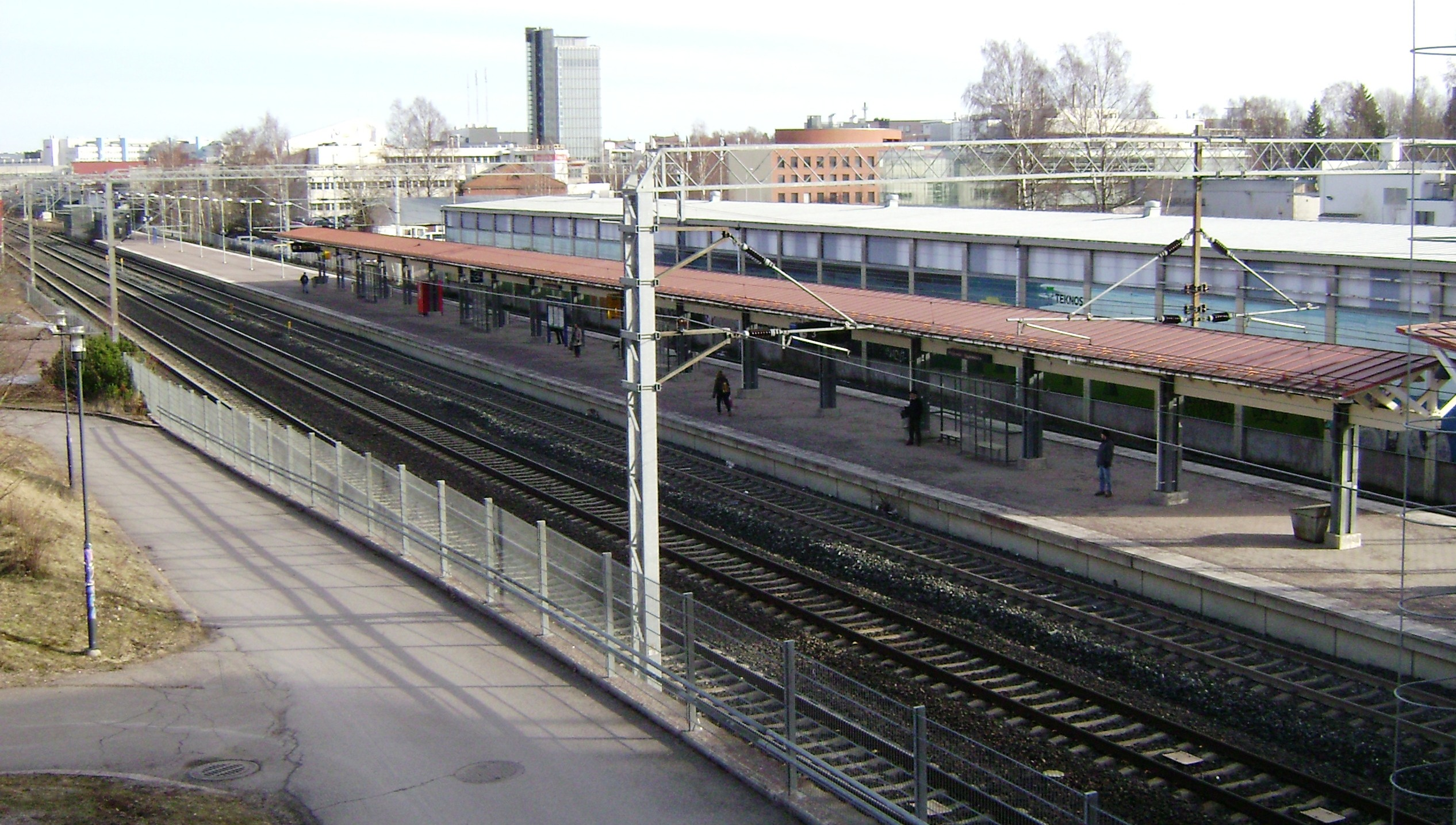

General information
- Location: Pitäjänmäentie 40, 00370; Helsinki; Finland
- Coordinates: 60°13′25″N 024°51′34″E
- System: Helsinki commuter rail station
- Owner: Finnish Transport Infrastructure Agency
- Operator: VR Group on behalf of HSL
- Line: Rantarata
- Platforms: Island platform
- Tracks: 2 (with platforms); 4 (in total)

Construction
- Architect: Bruno Granholm
- Architectural style: National Romanticism

Other information
- Station code: Pjm
- Fare zone: B

History
- Opened: 1904; 122 years ago

Passengers
- 2019: 978,392

Services
Preceding station	Helsinki commuter rail	Following station
Valimo towards Helsinki	L	Mäkkylä towards Kirkkonummi
Valimo towards Helsinki	A	Mäkkylä towards Leppävaara
Location

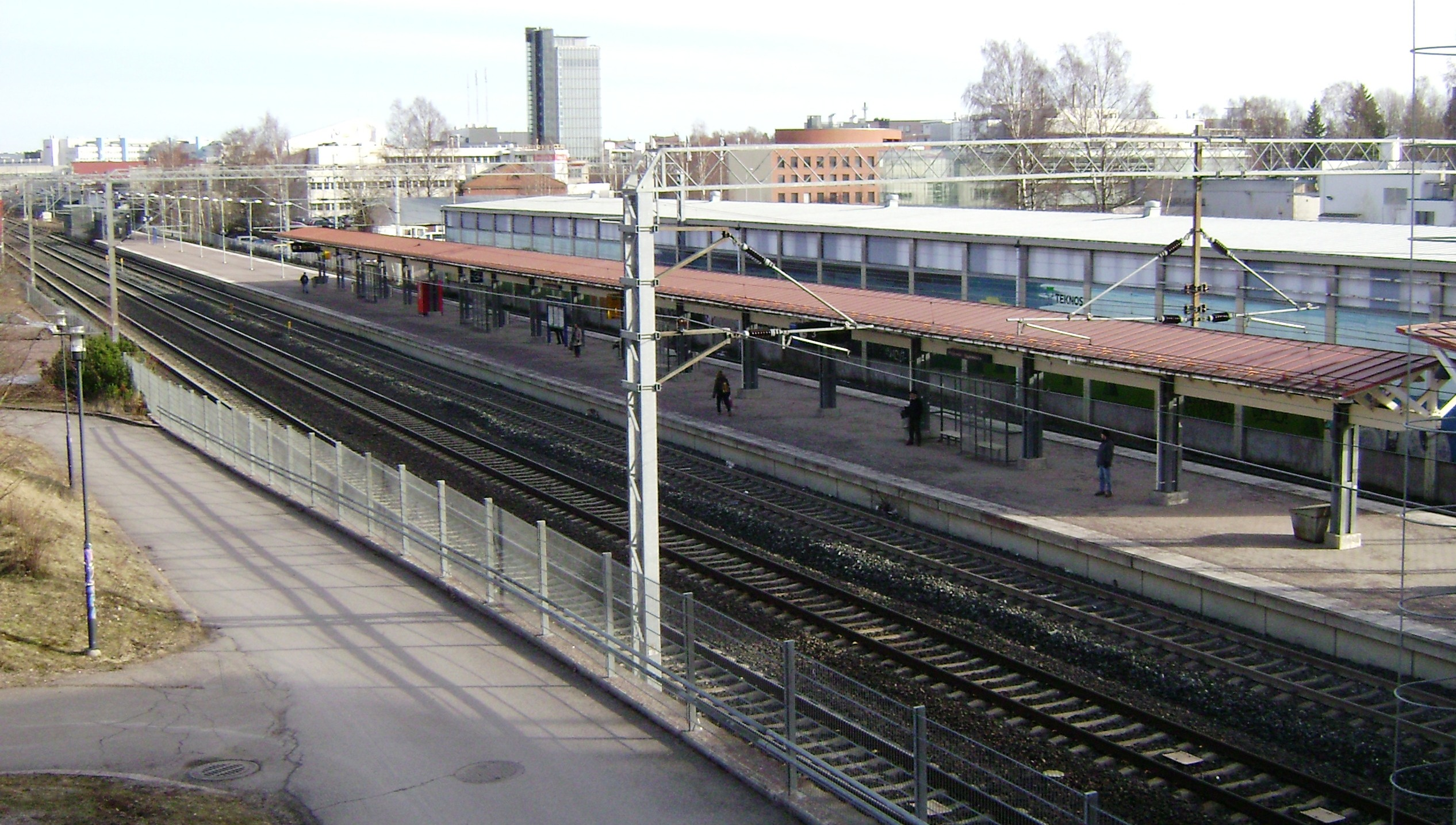

Pitäjänmäki station (Finnish: Pitäjänmäen rautatieasema, Swedish: Sockenbacka järnvägsstation) is a station on the Helsinki commuter rail network located in western Helsinki, Finland. It is located about 10 kilometres (6.2 mi) to the northwest of the Helsinki Central Station in the district of Pitäjänmäki, and is situated between the stations of Valimo and Mäkkylä.

The Finnish Heritage Agency has classified Pitäjänmäki railway station as a nationally significant built cultural environment.

== History ==
The National Romantic style station building of Pitäjänmäki railway station designed by architect Bruno Granholm was completed in 1902 and was expanded in 1911.

Pitäjänmäki was outlined to become a junction station already during the construction of the Rantarata line, with a rail connection planned to be built from Helsinki to Loimaa and further to the Tampere–Pori railway line, ending either at Peipohja (current Kokemäki) or Riste. These plans were later abandoned.

A freight station was opened at the Pitäjänmäki station in 1970 and remained operational until 1988. The ticket sales office at Pitäjänmäki was closed in 1987. The railyard received its current form during the construction of the Leppävaara urban line.

== Departure tracks ==
Pitäjänmäki railway station has four tracks, of which two (3, 4) have platforms for passenger trains. Tracks 1–2 are used by trains that skip the station.

- Track 3 is used by A and L trains to Helsinki.
- Track 4 is used by A trains to Leppävaara and L to Kirkkonummi.
