= Espoo railway station =

Railway station in Espoo, Finland

Espoo Esbo
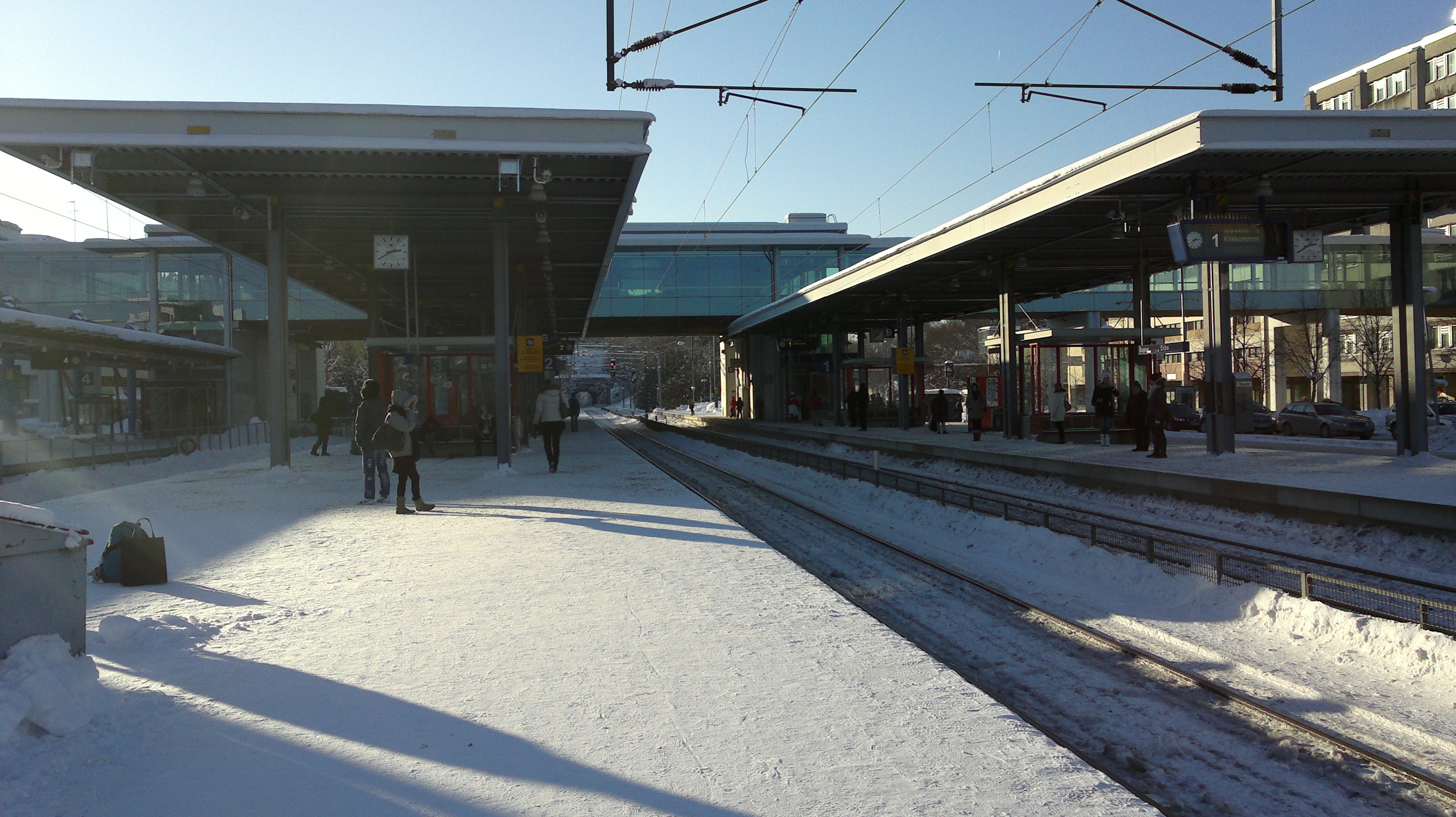

General information
- Location: Espoonsilta, 02770 Espoo
- Coordinates: 60°12′18″N 24°39′22″E
- System: Helsinki commuter rail station
- Owner: Finnish Transport Agency
- Platforms: 4
- Connections: Bus lines

Construction
- Structure type: ground station
- Accessible: 3
- Architect: Bruno Granholm (1903); Olavi Vanninen (1981)
- Architectural style: National Romanticism (1903) modern (1981)

Other information
- Fare zone: C

History
- Opened: 1903; 123 years ago

Passengers
- 2019: 2,762,992

Services
Preceding station	Helsinki commuter rail	Following station
Leppävaara towards Helsinki	Y	Kauklahti towards Siuntio
Tuomarila towards Helsinki	U	Kauklahti towards Kirkkonummi
Tuomarila towards Helsinki	L	Kauklahti towards Kirkkonummi
Tuomarila towards Helsinki	E	Kauklahti Terminus
Preceding station	VR commuter rail	Following station
Leppävaara towards Helsinki	H Limited service	Kirkkonummi towards Hanko
Location

Espoo railway station (Finnish: Espoon rautatieasema, Swedish: Esbo järnvägstation) is a railway station in the district of Espoon keskus in the city of Espoo, Finland. It is between the stations of Tuomarila and Kauklahti, about 20 kilometres (12 mi) from the Helsinki Central railway station.

An extension of the Leppävaara urban rail has been proposed to reach the Espoo station to be able to increase local train traffic on the Rantarata railway line (Helsinki–Turku) tracks between Helsinki and Espoo.

== History ==
The Rantarata railway line was originally meant to be built so that it would have run close to the Espoo Cathedral and even as the railway line was eventually built fairly close to the cathedral, this did not yet guarantee that a railway station would be opened at the village near the cathedral since Kauklahti was regarded as a more significant place for a railway station. Eventually, both the church village and Kauklahti received their own station.

The National Romantic style station building designed by Bruno Granholm was completed in 1903 and its plans were similar to that of the station building at Koski railway station at Salo. The station building was expanded in 1909, again with the designs of Bruno Granholm.

The area around the railway station started to change drastically in the 1970–1980's as the former rural village started to turn into the current cityscape. The current modern station building designed by Olavi Vanninen was completed in 1981. This building also functions as a pedestrian bridge across the train tracks. The current station building is currently owned by VR and the old buildings were acquired by the Senate Properties in 2007.

Espoo railway station used to be the station within the city of Espoo served by the Helsinki–Turku long-distance trains. In October 25, 2015, Leppävaara station replaced Espoo station as the long-distance train stop in the city of Espoo.

== Connections ==
Bus routes: 118, 531, 542, 241(V), 244(K), 245 (winter only), 245A (summer only), 246(K, T, KT), 134, 136, 200, 213, 235N, 243(K), 565, 566, 168, 169

== The station environment ==
The old station building has been present for over a century, but the tracks on both sides of it have changed. The tunnel through the city rock wasn't there originally; instead the tracks went past the rock on the north side at Läntinen jokitie. Also the cut face on the east side of the rock was made later. A road, Vanha ratavalli, goes along the old route of the tracks. At both places, traces of the tracks' old route could be seen in the ground as late as winter 2004.

== Departure tracks ==
Espoo railway station has four platform tracks. Tracks 3–4 are normally unused by passenger trains that stop at the station. In the past they were used by the E trains until 2007, when the terminus of the E train was moved from Espoo westwards to Kauklahti.

- Track 1 is used by commuter trains H to Hanko, Y to Siuntio, U and L to Kirkkonummi and E to Kauklahti.
- Track 2 is used by commuter trains H, Y, U, L and E to Helsinki.

On the other side of the platform track 1 is a bus stop and a taxi station. On the other side of the platform track 4 is the Espoo market square and a turning point for buses going northwards, and also the Espoontori shopping centre.
