= Valimo railway station =

Railway station in Helsinki, Finland

Valimo Gjuteriet
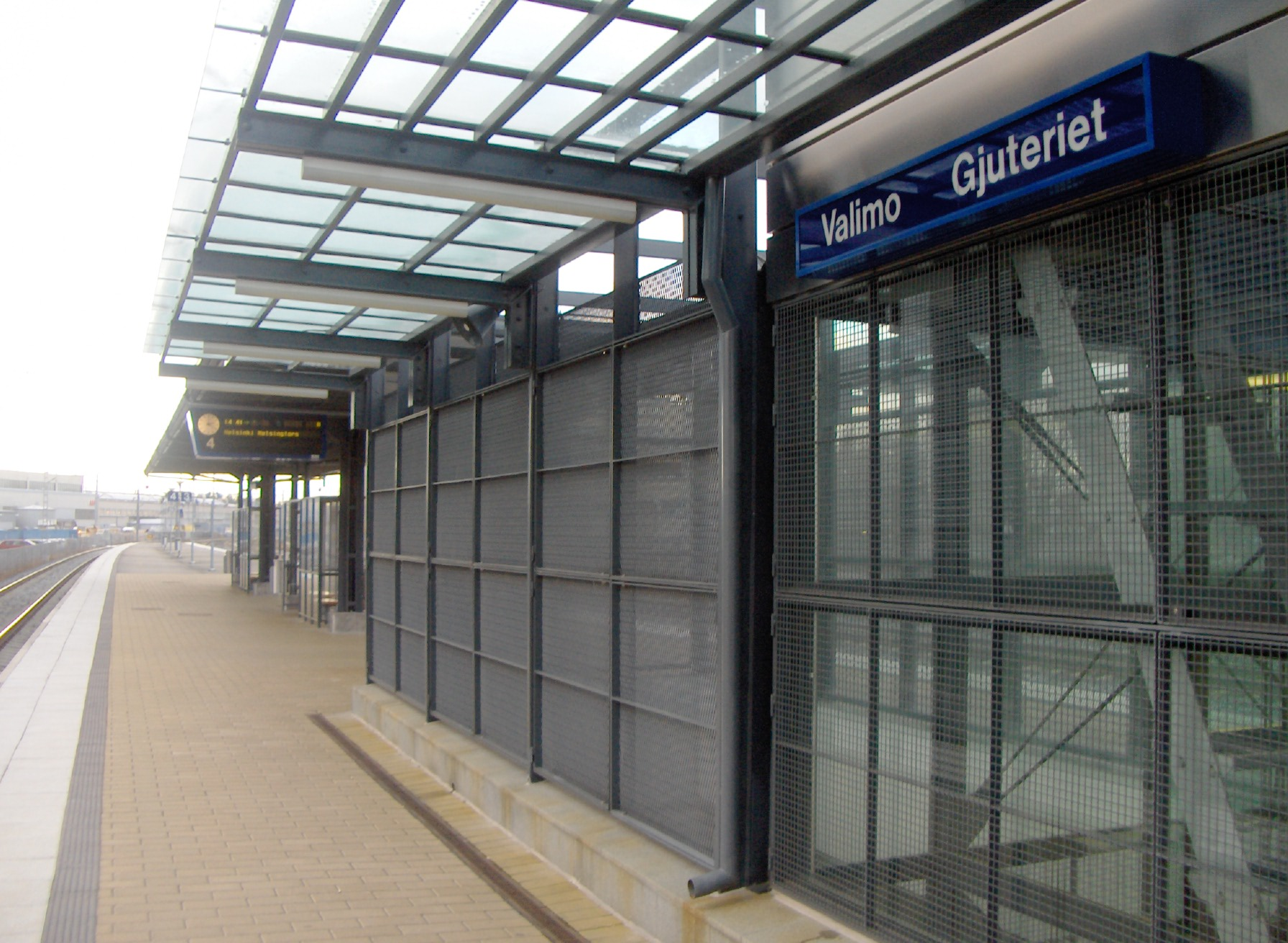

General information
- Location: Valimopolku 3, 00380; Pitäjänmäki industrial area, Helsinki
- Coordinates: 60°13′20″N 024°52′34″E
- System: Helsinki commuter rail station
- Owner: Finnish Transport Infrastructure Agency
- Line: Rantarata
- Platforms: Island platform
- Tracks: 2 with platforms 4 in total

Construction
- Accessible: 1

Other information
- Station code: Vmo
- Fare zone: B
- Classification: Halt

History
- Opened: 1 December 1949; 76 years ago (as Strömberg); 30 May 1976; 50 years ago (as Valimo)
- Rebuilt: 2000; 26 years ago
- Former names: Strömberg (1 December 1949 – 30 May 1976)

Passengers
- 2019: 1,048,435

Services
Preceding station	Helsinki commuter rail	Following station
Huopalahti towards Helsinki	A	Pitäjänmäki towards Leppävaara
Huopalahti towards Helsinki	L	Pitäjänmäki towards Kirkkonummi
Location

Valimo railway station (Finnish: Valimon rautatieasema, Swedish: Gjuteriets järnvägsstation) is a station on the Helsinki commuter rail network located in the western part of Helsinki, Finland, between Huopalahti and Pitäjanmäki stations. It is located about 7 kilometres (4.3 mi) to the northwest/west of Helsinki Central railway station, in the core of the Pitäjänmäki industrial area.

== History ==
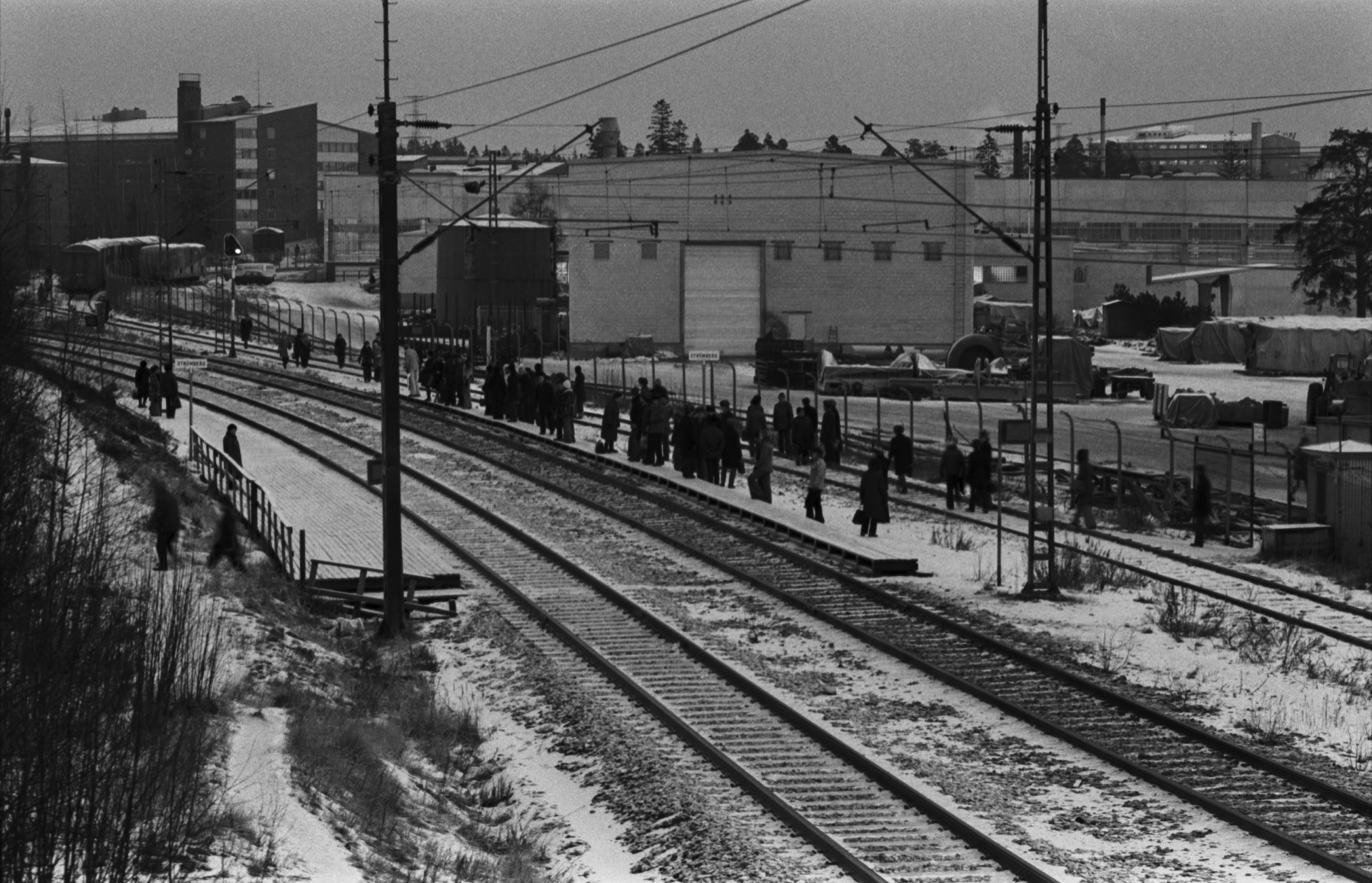
Strömberg halt in 1973

=== As Strömberg ===
The first iteration of the station was opened on 1 December 1949 under the name Strömberg. It was built exclusively to serve the workers of the Strömberg factory in the district of Pitäjänmäki; trains would only stop during times corresponding to the opening and closing times of work shifts at the facilities, and the only pathway to the halt was through the private area of the factory yards. As the Huutoniemi halt on the Seinäjoki–Vaasa railway was also called Strömberg at the time, fulfilling a similar purpose in Vaasa, it was first renamed Huutomäki on the day of the opening of the halt in Pitäjänmäki. Coinciding with parts of the rantarata being expanded to double track, Strömberg received another wooden side platform in 1958.

=== As Valimo ===
The Strömberg halt was closed on 30 May 1976 and was replaced by the contemporary station of Valimo, some 300 metres (0.19 mi) to the east from the old platforms towards Helsinki. Unlike Strömberg, however, Valimo was intended to serve the entire industrial area in Pitäjänmäki. During the construction of the Leppävaara City Line, an additional pair of tracks from Helsinki to Leppävaara exclusively to be used by trains on the Helsinki commuter rail network, temporary platforms were built in Valimo in 1995. The wholly renovated station was inaugurated on 16 October 2000. By that time, the area served by the station had over 9,000 jobs.

In the early 1990s, an eventually rejected plan proposed that the Valimo and Pitäjänmäki stations should be merged and the platforms moved back to the site of the former Strömberg factories. The plans also included the building of a surrounding shopping mall, akin to the Malmi station.

In 2000, the ABB Group proposed that the Valimo halt be once again renamed Strömberg (Swedish: Strömbergs); the proposal was also backed by the city council of Helsinki. The plan was not accepted by the Railway Administration, however.

== Architecture ==
The Valimo station was designed by architectural firm Arkkitehtitoimisto CJN Oy, and was constructed by Tekra Oy. The underpass is entirely constructed of concrete, with ceramic tiles decorating its walls. The open space connecting the tunnel and the stairwell leading to the platforms is equipped with a skylight. The elevator and its shaft also have walls made of glass, supported by steel frames.

== Services ==
Valimo is served by line A to Leppävaara on the Helsinki commuter rail network. The line makes stops at all stations on its route. The station has a HSL ticket vending machine, as well as elevators and 55 centimetres (22 in) high platforms for accessibility.

The Valimo bus line terminus is located right to the south of the station, in the north end of the Valimotie street. Bus stops are also present on its east side, on regional road 120 (or Vihdintie). Additionally, there is a city bike terminal right by the north end of the station underpass. The Valimo station, as well as its surrounding bus stops, belong to HSL fare zone B.

== Departure tracks ==
Valimo railway station has four tracks, of which two (3, 4) have platforms for passenger trains. Tracks 1–2 are used by trains that skip the station.

- Track 3 is used by A and L trains to Helsinki.
- Track 4 is used by A trains to Leppävaara and L to Kirkkonummi.
