= Ilmala railway station =

Railway station in Helsinki, Finland

Ilmala
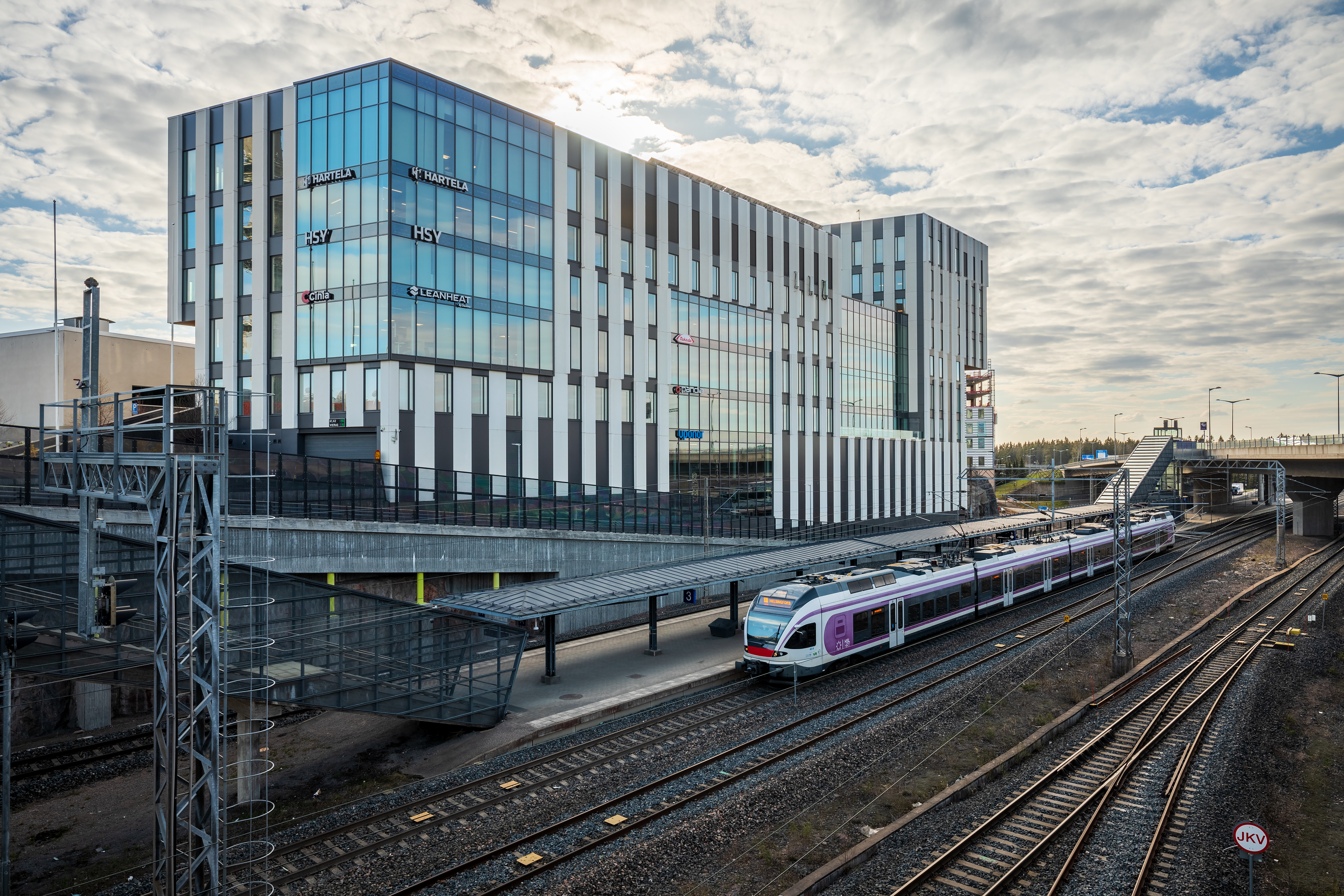
- Ilmala railway station

General information
- Location: Postintaival, 00230 Helsinki; Postrutten, 00230 Helsingfors
- Coordinates: 60°12′28″N 024°55′16″E
- System: Helsinki commuter rail station
- Owner: Finnish Transport Agency
- Platforms: 1
- Connections: bus lines 23, 57, 59, 63 tram lines 9, 9N

Construction
- Structure type: ground station
- Accessible: 1

Other information
- Fare zone: A

History
- Opened: 25 May 1967; 59 years ago

Passengers
- 2019: 1,431,210

Services
Preceding station	Helsinki commuter rail	Following station
Pasila towards Helsinki	A	Huopalahti towards Leppävaara
Pasila towards Helsinki	L	Huopalahti towards Kirkkonummi
Huopalahti One-way operation	I counterclockwise via Tikkurila	Pasila towards Helsinki
Pasila One-way operation	P clockwise via Myyrmäki	Huopalahti towards Helsinki via Airport
Location

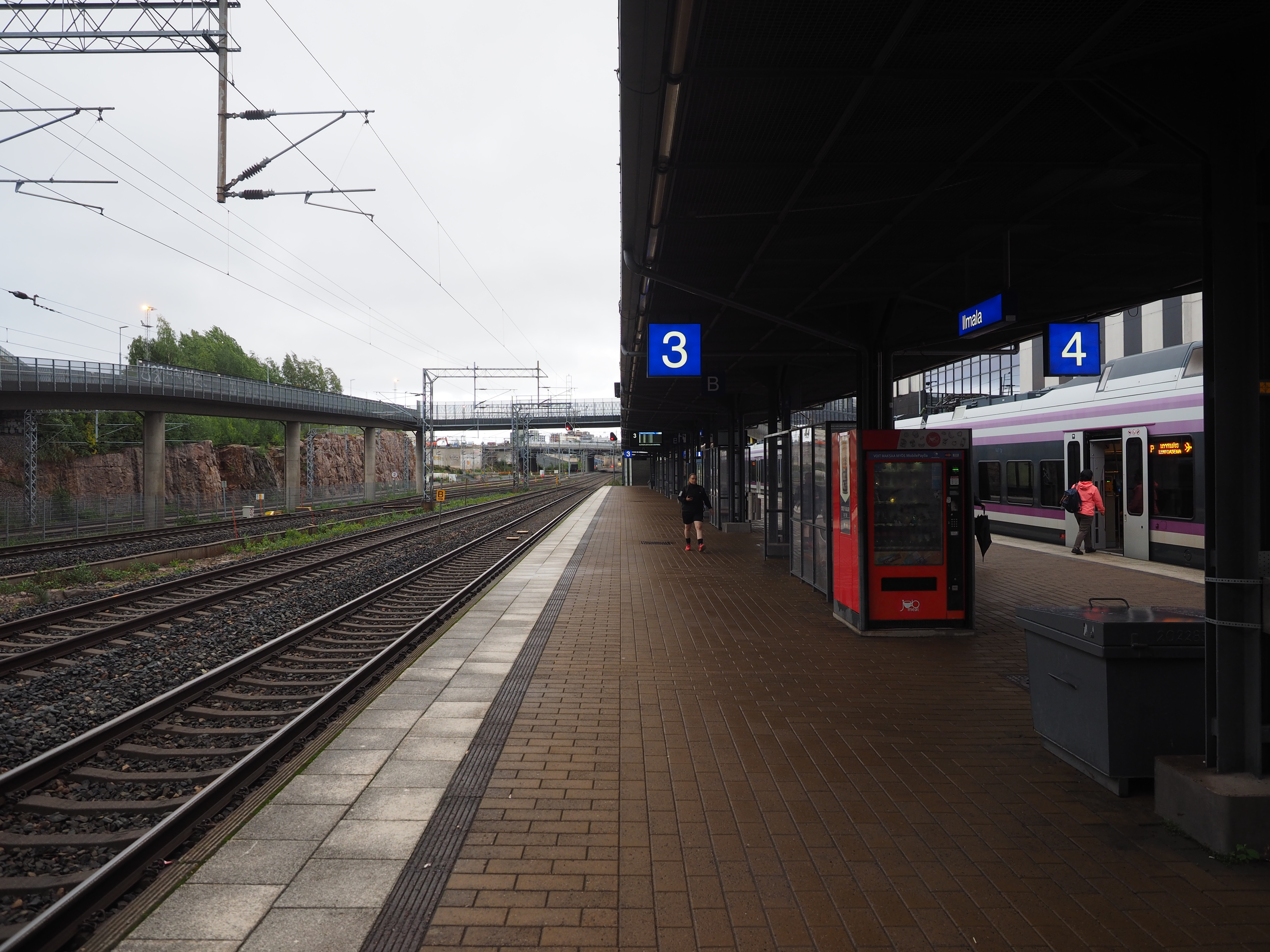
A view of the platforms at Ilmala railway station

Ilmala railway station (Finnish: Ilmalan rautatieasema, Swedish: Ilmala järnvägsstation) is a railway station on the VR commuter rail network located in northern Helsinki, Finland. It is approximately 4 kilometres (2.5 mi) north of Helsinki Central railway station. The VR Group maintains a depot north of the station.

The station was opened in 1967 to serve the newly built television studios of the Finnish public broadcaster Yle and commercial broadcaster MTV3.

== Ilmala depot ==
North of the Ilmala station, in Pohjois-Pasila between the two branches of the railway which go respectively to Huopalahti and Tikkurila, a large space is used for the VR train and bus depot (Ilmalan varikko) and for Posti sorting centre (Postinkeskus or Posti lajittelukeskus) and related offices.

Near the tracks, VR has built a 100,000 m³ depot to accumulate excess snow which cannot be eliminated by the snow-melting field in Pasila. The depot can also melt snow with heat from the return water of the buildings' heating which uses district heating provided by Helen.

== Helsinki operating point ==
Ilmala is one part of the split railway operating point of Helsinki, the other parts of which include the passenger stations of Helsinki, Pasila, Käpylä and Oulunkylä, the Pasila freight and car loading stations, the Ilmala depot and the Helsinki Kivihaka crossover.

== Departure tracks ==
Ilmala railway station has four tracks, of which two (3, 4) have platforms for passenger trains.

- Track 3 is used by A, L and I trains to Helsinki.
- Track 4 is used by A trains to Leppävaara, L to Kirkkonummi and P trains to the Helsinki Airport.

== Nearby landmarks ==
- Pöllölaakso (headquarters of MTV3 until late-2022)
- Yle Mediatalo (fi: Mediatalo) and Studiotalo (fi: Studiotalo)
