= Pasila railway station =

Railway station in Helsinki, Finland

Coordinates: 60°11′55″N 024°56′01″E

Pasila Böle
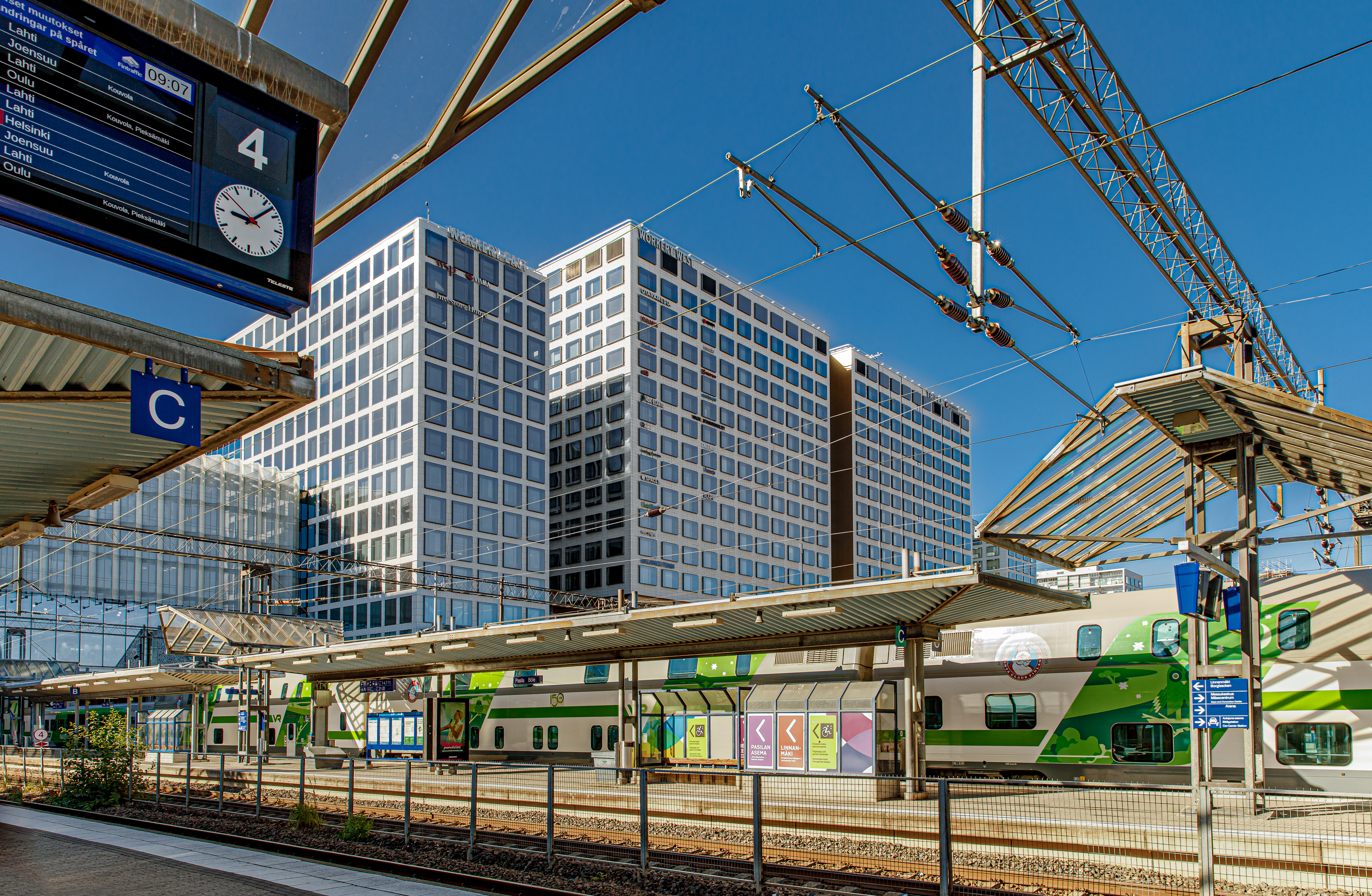
- The station in August 2022

General information
- Location: Ratapihantie 6, 00520 Helsinki; Bangårdsvägen 6, 00520 Helsingfors
- System: VR station
- Line: Helsinki–Riihimäki railway
- Platforms: 6
- Tracks: 11
- Connections: Helsinki tram 2 7 9 13 Helsinki buses

Construction
- Structure type: Elevated
- Cycle facilities: Bicycle storage, City Bike station
- Accessible: Yes

Other information
- Station code: PSL
- Fare zone: A

History
- Opened: 1862; 164 years ago
- Rebuilt: 1990; 36 years ago 2019; 7 years ago
- Electrified: 26 January 1969; 57 years ago
- Former names: Fredriksberg (Swedish)

Passengers
- 2019: 16,702,694 (Helsinki commuter)
Services
Preceding station	Helsinki commuter rail	Following station
Helsinki Terminus	Y	Huopalahti towards Siuntio
Helsinki Terminus	U	Huopalahti towards Kirkkonummi
Helsinki Terminus	L	Ilmala towards Kirkkonummi
Helsinki Terminus	E	Huopalahti towards Kauklahti
Helsinki Terminus	A	Ilmala towards Leppävaara
Helsinki Terminus	K	Käpylä towards Kerava
Helsinki One-way operation	I counterclockwise via Tikkurila	Käpylä towards Helsinki via Airport
Helsinki One-way operation	P clockwise via Myyrmäki	Ilmala towards Helsinki via Airport
Preceding station	VR commuter rail	Following station
Helsinki Terminus	T	Käpylä towards Riihimäki
Helsinki Terminus	D	Tikkurila towards Riihimäki or Hämeenlinna
Helsinki Terminus	R	Tikkurila towards Riihimäki or Tampere
Helsinki Terminus	Z	Tikkurila towards Lahti or Kouvola
Helsinki Terminus	H Limited service	Leppävaara towards Hanko
Preceding station	VR Group	Following station
Helsinki Terminus	Helsinki–Riihimäki	Tikkurila towards Riihimäki
Helsinki Terminus	Helsinki–Turku	Leppävaara towards Turku Harbour
Helsinki Terminus	Helsinki–Kemijärvi (overnight service)	Tikkurila towards Kemijärvi
Helsinki Terminus	Helsinki–Kolari (overnight service)	Tikkurila towards Kolari
Location
- Location within Helsinki (mainland)

Pasila station (Finnish: Pasilan rautatieasema, Swedish: Böle järnvägstation; previous Swedish name was Fredriksberg until 1990) is a railway station in Helsinki, Finland, approximately 3.5 kilometres (2.2 mi) north of Helsinki Central. It is the second busiest railway station in Finland, after Helsinki Central, and takes up a large part of the district of Pasila. The station was first opened in 1862 along the Finnish Main Line. The current (and fourth) station building opened in 2019.

Pasila station is used to ease the congestion on the city's central station by serving as an alternate point of departure or arrival within Helsinki. All trains, both long-distance and local, travelling to and from Helsinki stop at Pasila.

The Finnish Main Line going to the north (to Oulu via Tampere) and the Rantarata going to the west (to Turku) separate from each other at Pasila railway station. The Helsinki commuter trains in the direction of Riihimäki as well as all long-distance trains except those going to Turku use the Finnish Mainline, while the commuter trains towards Vantaankoski and Kirkkonummi, as well as long-distance trains to Turku use the Rantarata line.

Pasila station is one of two stations in Helsinki to serve long-distance traffic, the other being the central station. All other stations in Helsinki only serve local traffic. In terms of train lines, the only differences between Pasila station and the central station are the smaller number of tracks with platforms (11 compared to 19).

In 2012, the loading and unloading of cars onto trains was moved from Helsinki Central to a new car terminal built north of Pasila.

The station was under extensive renovation from 2015 to 2019. The new station opened on 17 October 2019.

== Station building ==
The current station building in Pasila was taken into use on 17 October 2019. It has been built on top of pillars above the tracks, and is integrally connected to the Mall of Tripla shopping centre next to it. The Pasilansilta traffic bridge connecting the districts of Itä-Pasila and Länsi-Pasila passes to the south of the Pasila railway station and the shopping centre.

== History ==
=== Background ===
The first side tracks in Pasila were built in the late 1870s when traffic in the city centre and the Sörnäinen harbour increased. The proper start of the construction of the railway yard is seen as have happened from 1889 to 1890.

=== First station building ===
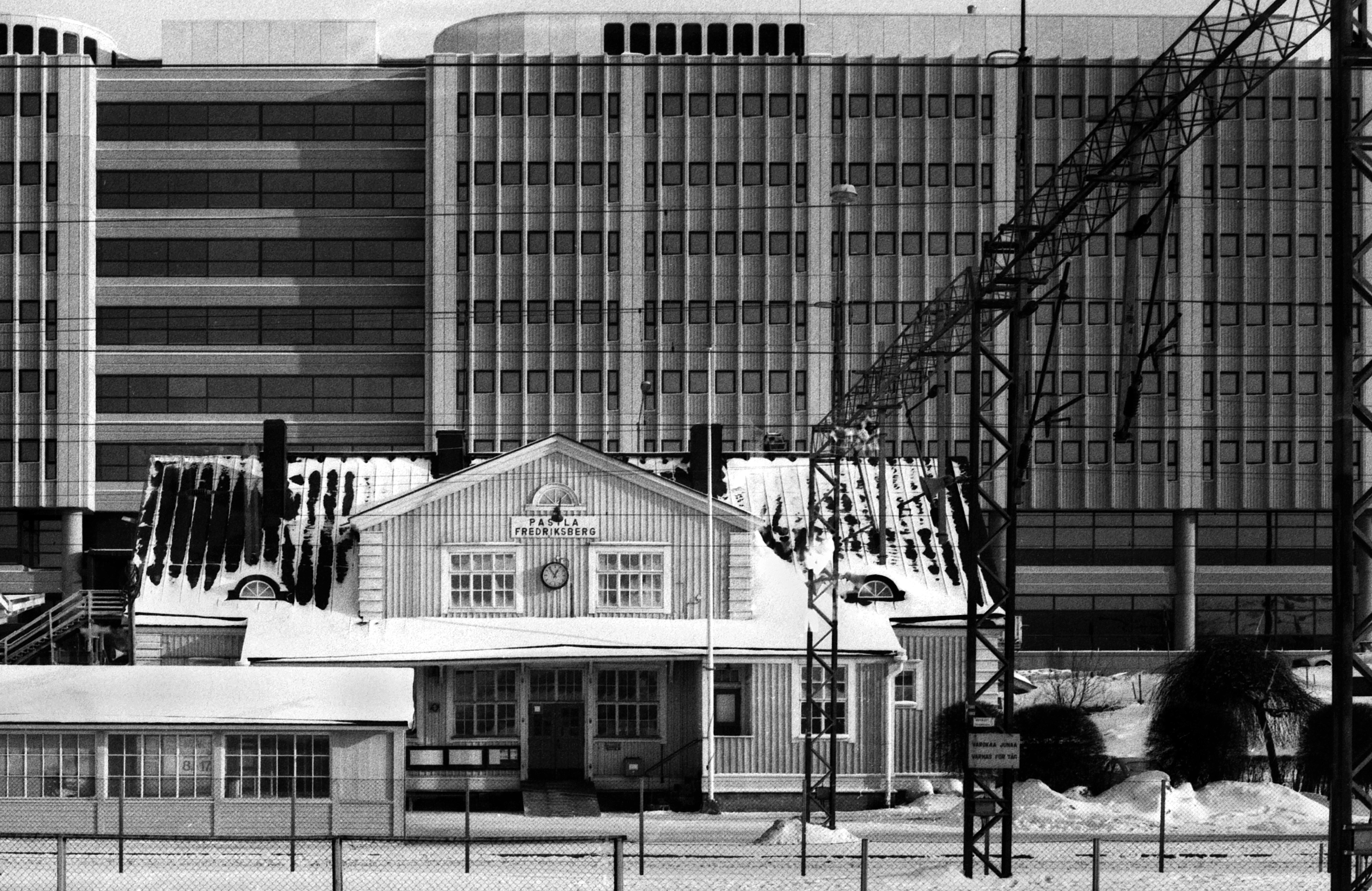
The first station building in Pasila in the 1970s. In the background is the Pasila agency building.

The current station building is the fourth station building in Pasila, if temporary buildings are not counted. The first station building, probably designed by Bruno Granholm, was built in the 1890s to the western edge of the railway yard to the north of the current Toralinna building. It was originally named Fredriksberg after the farm located near it. An area of small residential buildings, called Puu-Pasila ("wooden Pasila"), was formed near the station in the early 20th century.

=== Expansion ===
The basis for the plan to expand the railway yard was a suggestion by the German engineering bureau C.O. Gleim & Eyde. The railway yards both in Pasila and in the city centre were built and expanded from 1900 to 1928. In the 1920s passenger traffic on the railways was moved to new tracks built on the east side of the original railway yard, and the original railway yard remained only for cargo traffic. At this time, the wooden station building at Vammeljoki on the Karelian Isthmus was moved to the east side of the tracks in Pasila to serve as the new station building. This also broke off the connection between the station building and Puu-Pasila. There were only industrial halls and warehouses in the vicinity of the station at the current area of Itä-Pasila. At the time, the Pasila station was primarily an exchange station, where passengers could move from trains arriving to Helsinki via the Rantarata line to trains departing from Helsinki to the north on the Finnish Main Line, or the other way around.

The Finnish name "Pasila" for the station was made official by the Finnish Railway Administration in 1925. The name comes from Karl Pasila, a long-time tenant at the Fredriksberg farm, whose name had already been in use for the area. The Swedish name for the station remained as "Fredriksberg", even though the Swedish name for the district of Pasila was Böle.

Eliel Saarinen proposed in his Pro Helsingfors plan in 1918 to move the Helsinki Central Station into Pasila.

=== New station buildings in 1990 and 2019 ===
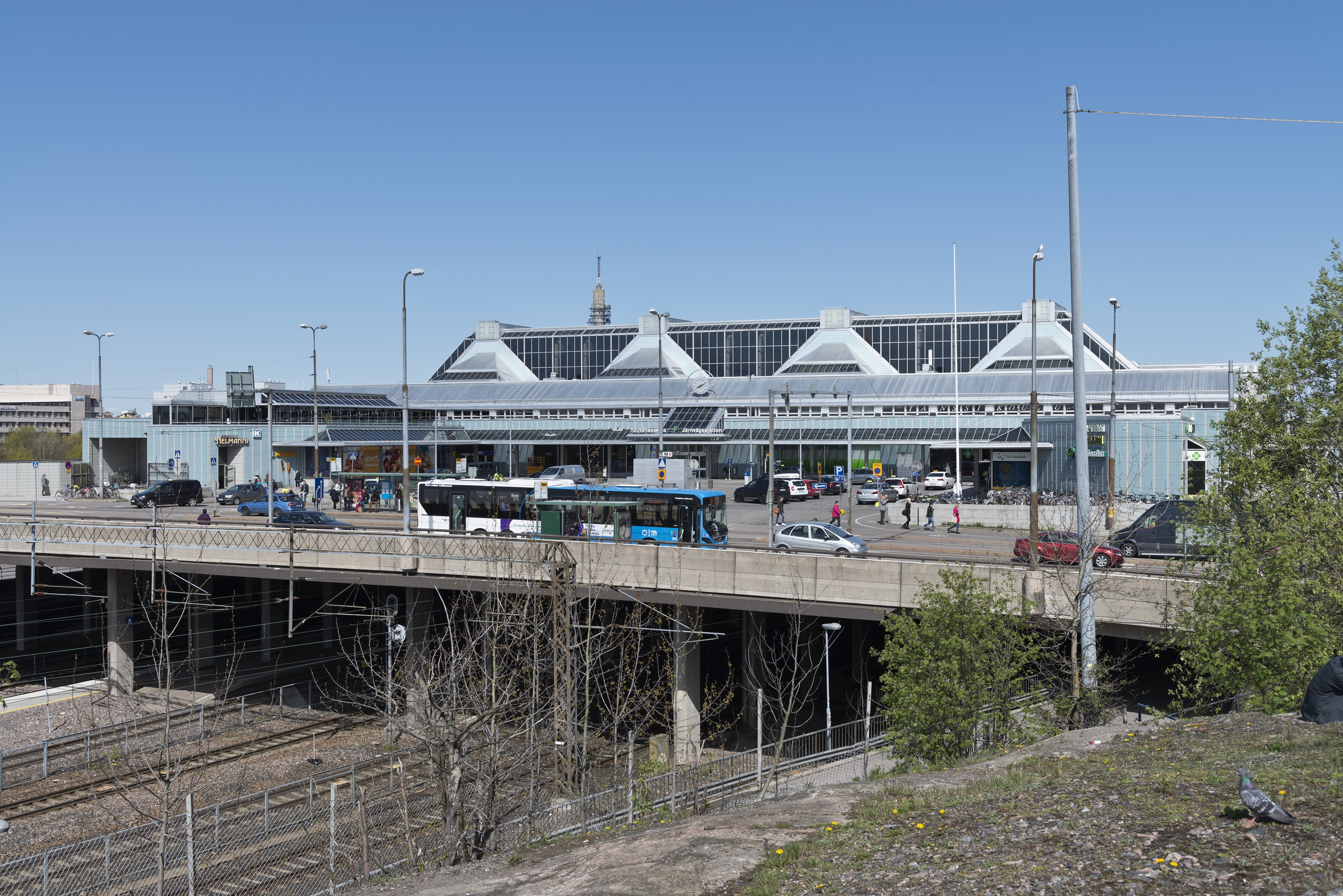
The station building used from 1990 to 2017, dismantled in summer 2017.

During the construction of Itä-Pasila, the old station building was left on the Ratapihantie street passing the railway yard, and for several years, the street was narrower at the railway station than elsehwere. In 1984 the building was moved to the nearby Veturitori square to serve as the office of the Peace Union of Finland, as the so-called "Rauhanasema" ("Station of Peace") building. The new station building was built in 1990 on top of pillars above the tracks, and it also hosted business spaces and restaurants. However, it fared rather poorly as a commercial centre.

The Swedish name of the station was changed from Fredriksberg to Böle on 27 May 1990. Since the opening of the new station building, as well as the Helsinki commuter trains, all long-distance trains to and from Helsinki have also stopped at Pasila. Ticket sales at the Pasila railway station were stopped in the beginning of 2016.

The station building, built in 1990, was closed down on 19 June 2017, after which it was dismantled to make way for the new station building and the Mall of Tripla. Even before this, on 3 April 2017, a temporary new station building had been built on top of the station platforms slightly to the north of the old station. The current station building and the Mall of Tripla connected to it were opened on 17 October 2019.

=== Pasila cargo railway yard ===
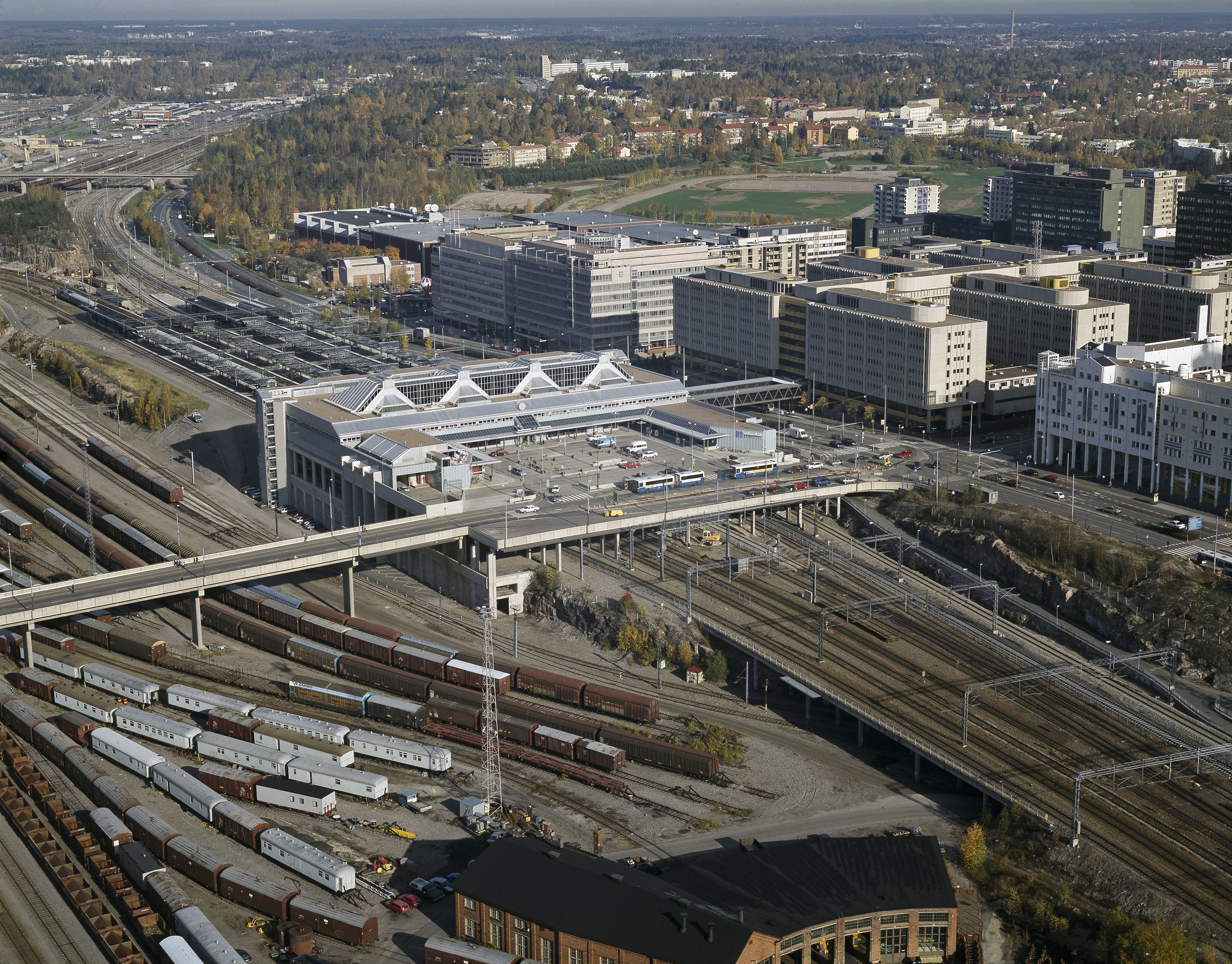
Train carriages at the railway yard in 1995.

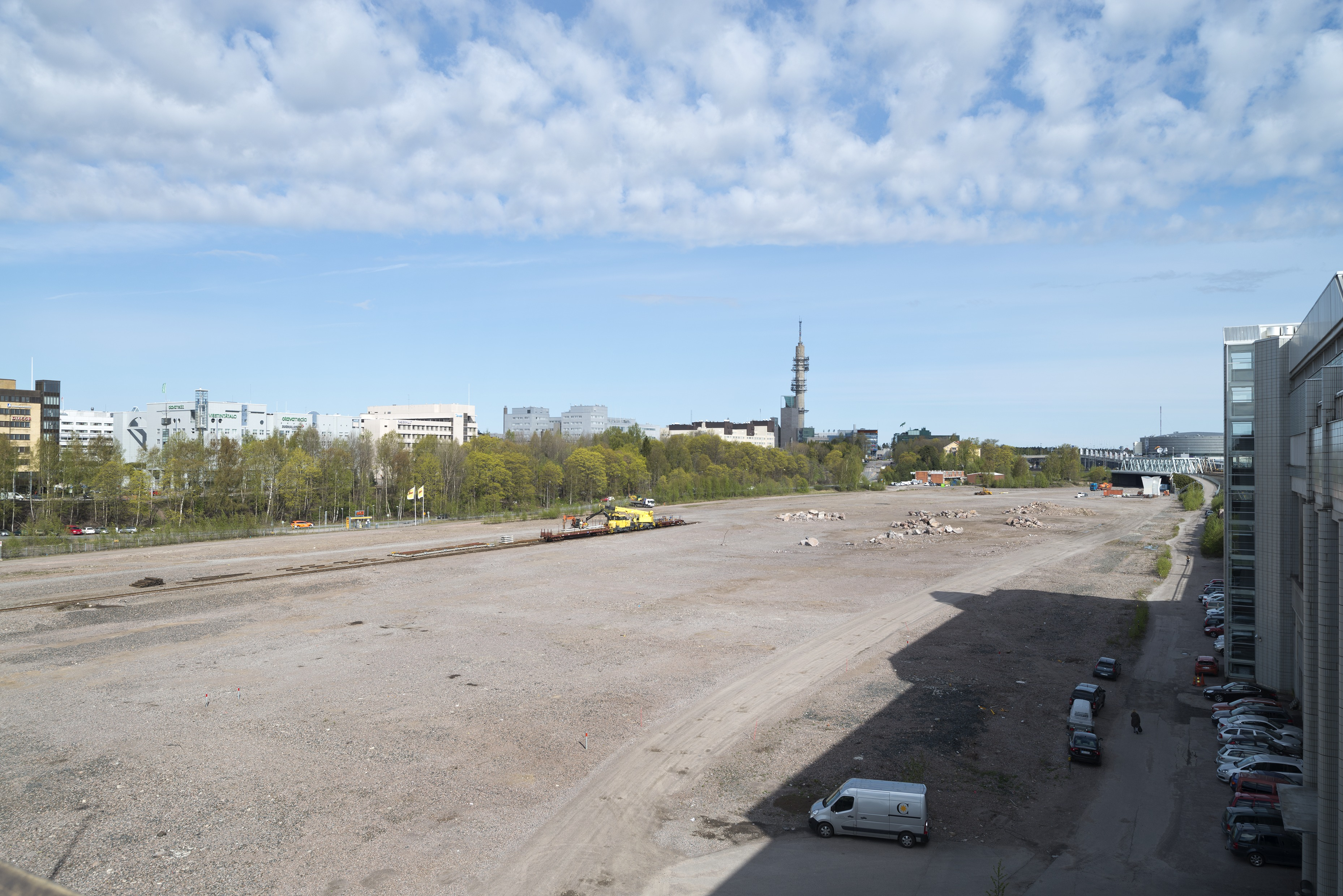
A view of Keski-Pasila in 2014, four years after the dismantling of the railway yard. Veturitie, the new main street of Pasila, has since been built in place of the Pasila lower yard.

To the west of the Pasila railway station, lower than the platform area, at the current site of Keski-Pasila, was located the former cargo railway yard, officially named the Pasila lower yard. It was located in a valley at whose site was originally located the lake Töölönjärvi, dried up in the 1870s. This railway yard was used for sorting cargo traffic and as a hub point between the Helsinki harbour rail and the Sörnäinen harbour rail. The railway yard was connected to the Finnish Main Line, the Rantarata line and the Ilmala depot. The Sörnäinen harbour rail started directly to the east of the railway yard and a side rail branched off it towards the Pasila machinery yard.

The Pasila lower yard was disused in 2008 when the Vuosaari Harbour was completed and cargo ship traffic moved there from the West Harbour and the Sörnäinen Harbour. The harbour rails in the city centre were dismantled, and the Vuosaari harbour rail was built to serve the new harbour. New business, office and residential buildings were built in place of the former cargo railway yard, such as the Mall of Tripla shopping centre. New streets have also been built in the area, with Veturitie being the central main streets. The Pasila car transport station was built in place of the dismantled rails in 2012.

== Platforms ==
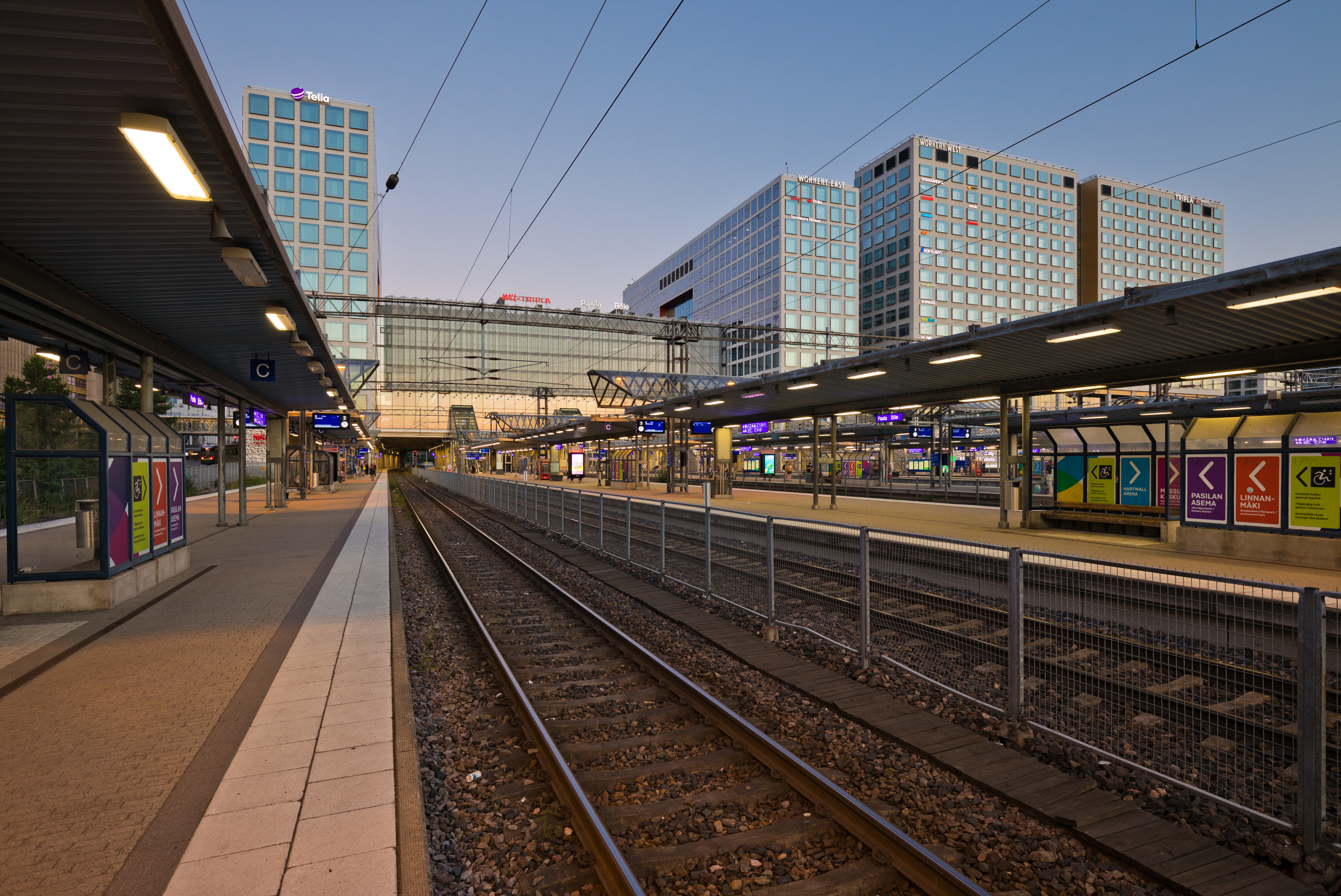
The platform area.

All passenger trains arriving to and departing from Helsinki stop at Pasila. Trains to Russia did not stop at Pasila in the early 1990s, and the Allegro train to Saint Petersburg did not stop at Pasila from 2016 to 2020.

On 12 August 2019 the platform numbering in Pasila changed so that platform 5b became platform 6, platform 6 became platform 7, platform 7 became platform 8, platform 8 became platform 9 and platform 9 became platform 10. A new platform, numbered 11, was taken into use in October 2019. Platform 7 is usually only used in exceptional circumstances.

- Platform 1: T, P and K trains to Helsinki.
- Platform 2: I trains to the Airport, K trains to Kerava and T trains to Riihimäki.
- Platforms 3 and 4: R trains to Riihimäki and Tampere, D trains to Hämeenlinna, and Pendolino and InterCity trains towards Tampere and Kouvola.
- Platforms 5 and 6: D, R, Z, Pendolino and InterCity trains to Helsinki.
- Platform 7: Empty commuter, only trains between Helsinki and Ilmala depot use the track.
- Platform 8: E trains to Kauklahti, U trains to Kirkkonummi, Y trains to Siuntio, H trains to Hanko and InterCity and Pendolino trains to Turku and Turku satama.
- Platform 9: E, U, Y, H, InterCity and Pendolino trains to Helsinki.
- Platform 10: A, I and L trains to Helsinki.
- Platform 11: A trains to Leppävaara, L trains to Kirkkonummi and Siuntio and P trains to the Airport.
- Platforms 21/22: Car-carrying carriages for overnight InterCity and express trains to Kemijärvi, Kolari and Rovaniemi.

== Connections ==
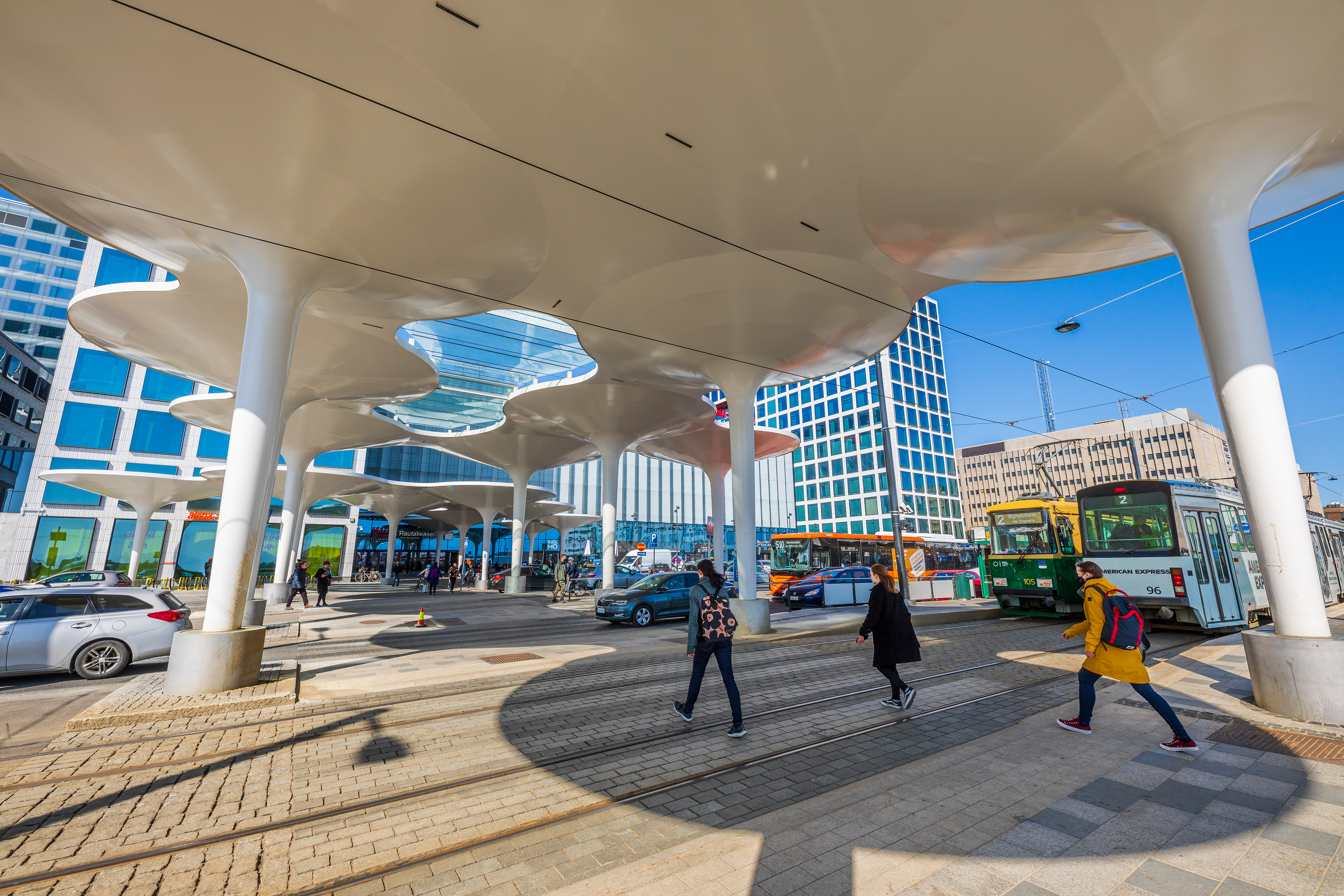
A public transport terminal at the Pasilansilta bridge.

- VR Group commuter trains
- VR Group long-distance trains
- Helsinki tram lines 2, 7, 9 and 13
- Bus lines in Helsinki:
  - 23 Helsinki Railway Square - Pasila - Pirkkola
  - 500 Itäkeskus - Pasila - Munkkivuori
  - 510 Herttoniemi - Pasila - Tapiola - Kivenlahti
  - 59 Herttoniemi - Kalasatama - Pasila - Malminkartano
  - 69 Kamppi - Patola - Malmi - Jakomäki
  - 506 Myllypuro - Viikki - Kumpula - Pasila - Meilahti - Ruskeasuo
  - 518 Ilmala - Pasila - Jakomäki - Hakunila - Kuninkaanmäki

== Gallery ==
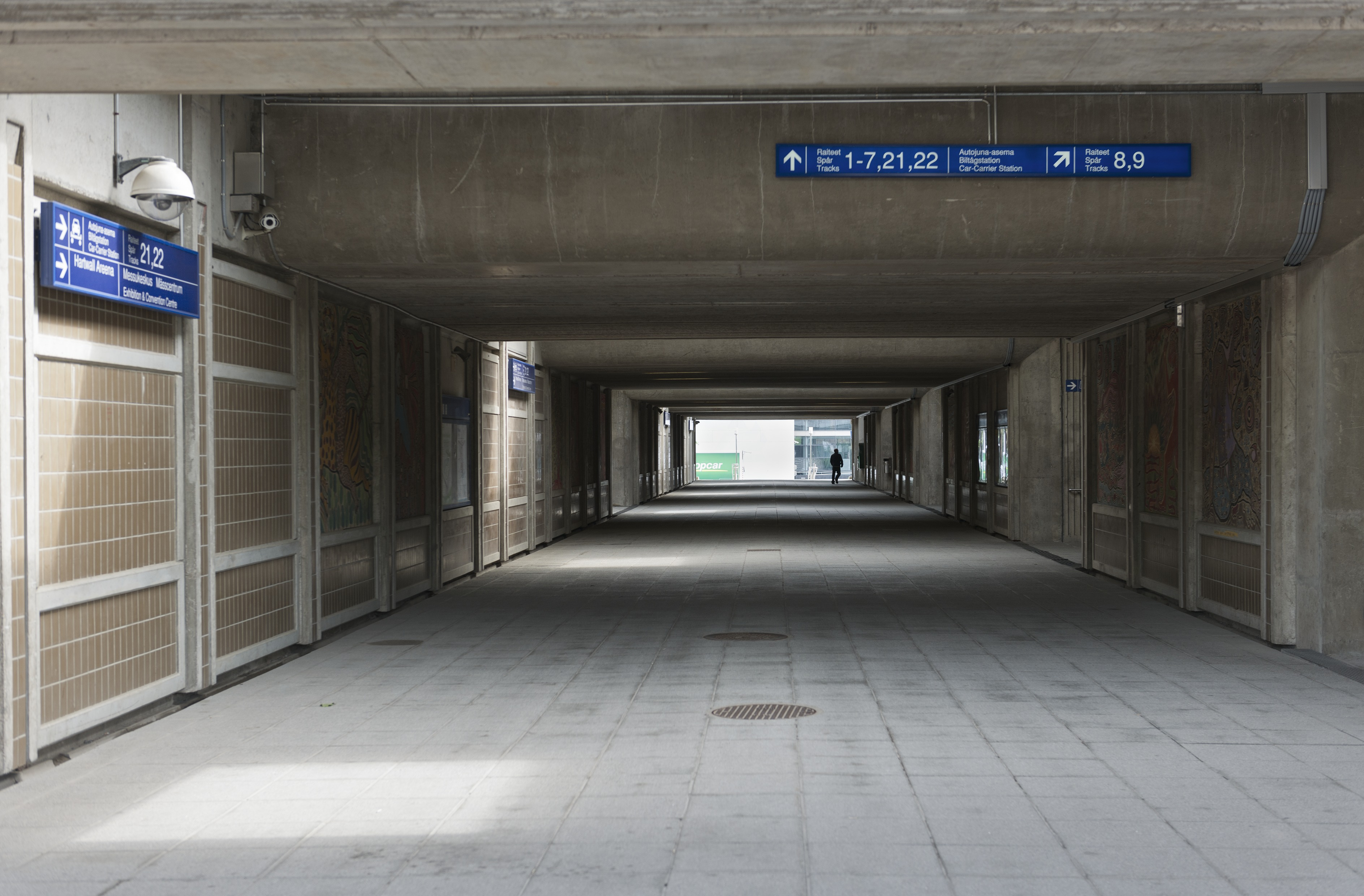
An underpass tunnel to the north of the station connecting the streets of Veturitie and Ratapihantie.

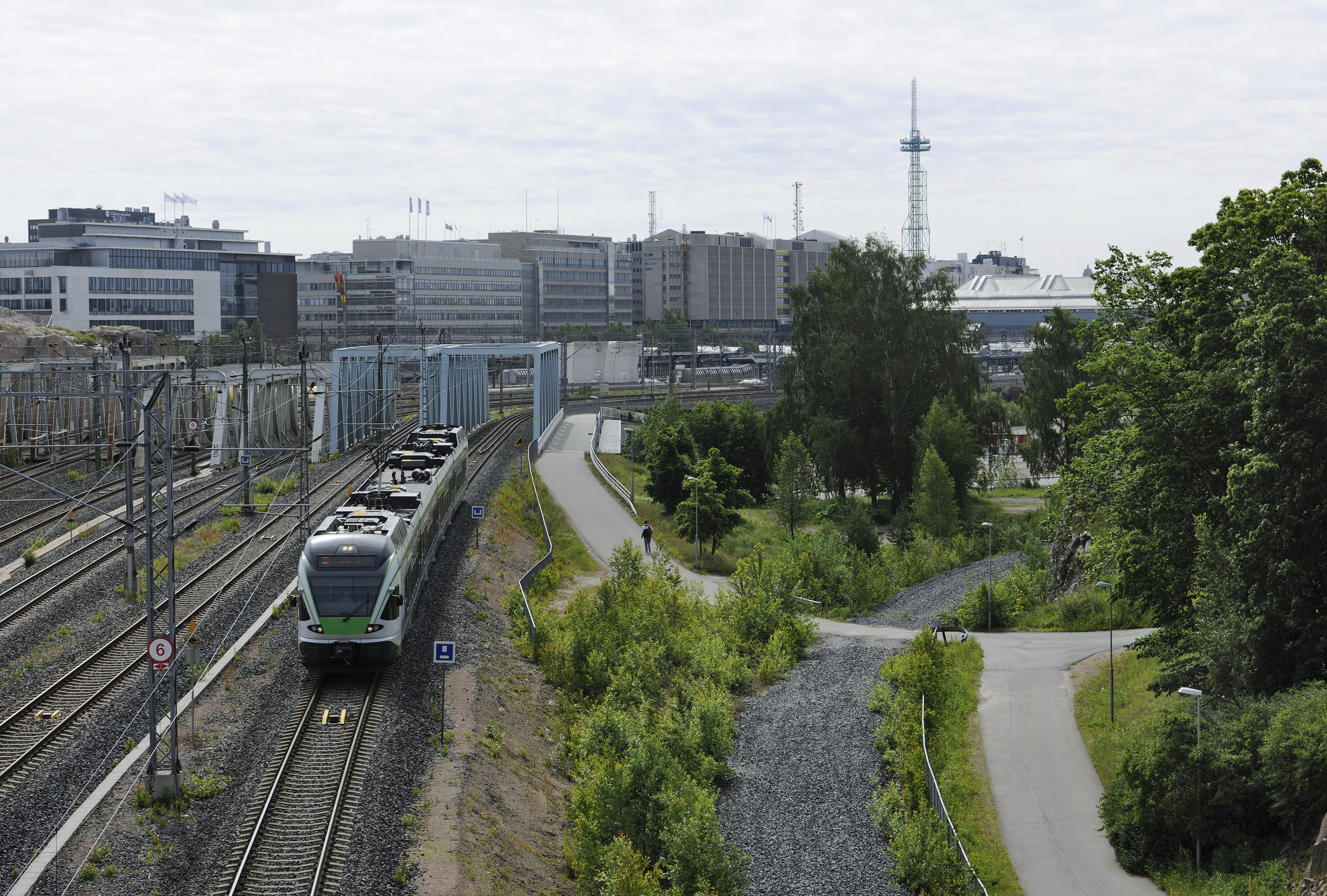
The Rantarata line branches off to the west at the Pasila station over grid bridges.

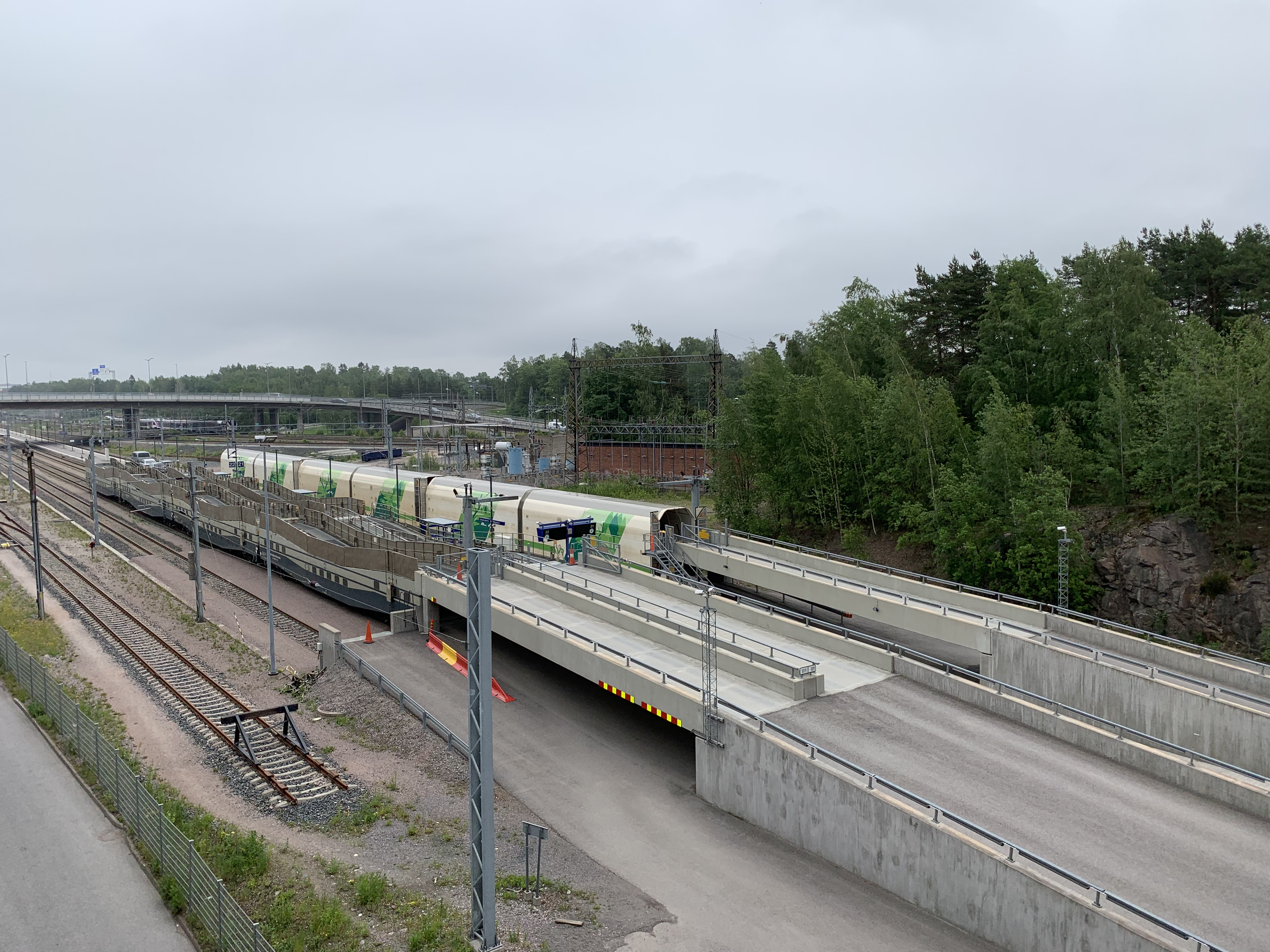
The Pasila car carrying station is located near the Helsinki Halli.

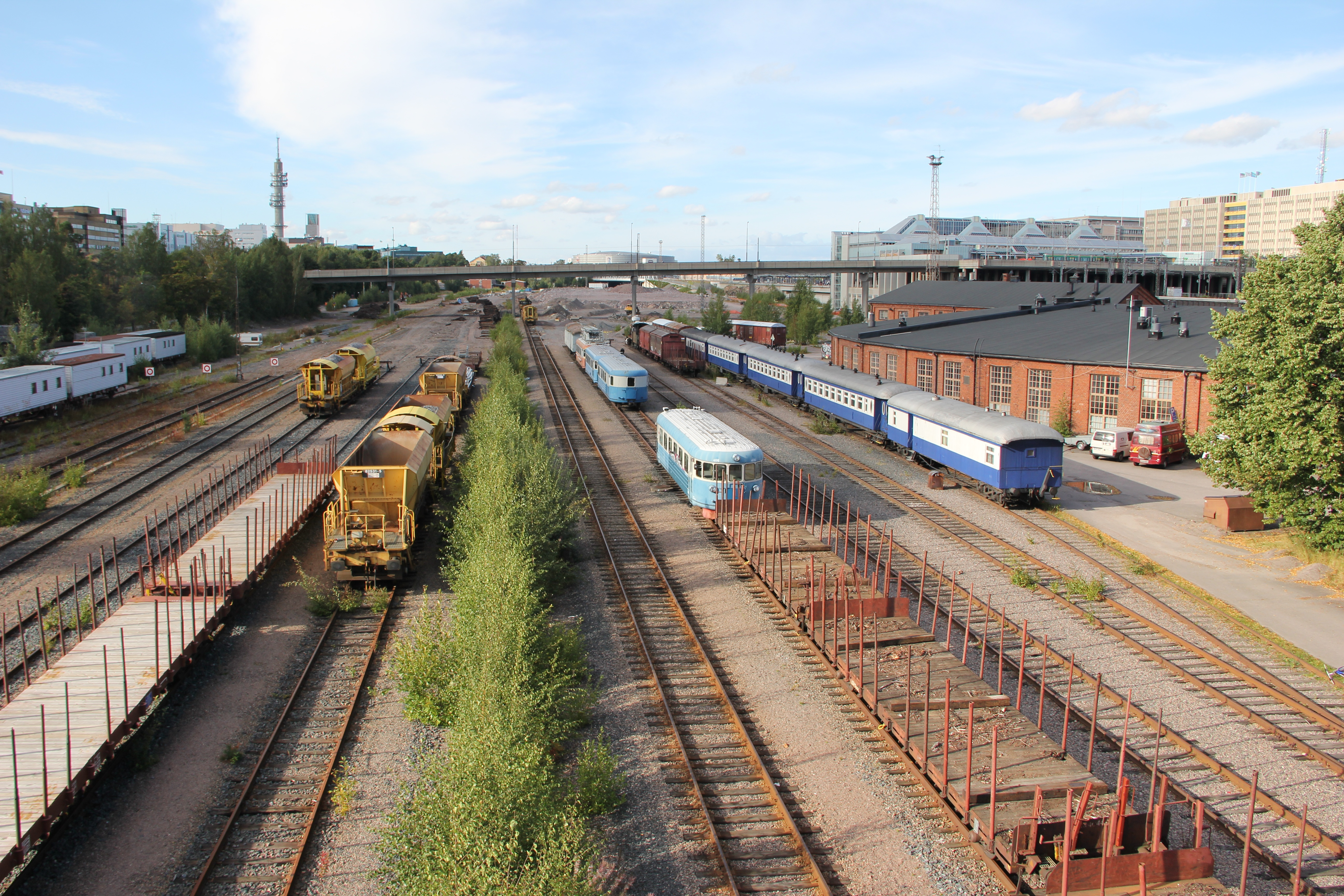
A small part of the former railway yard remains to the west of the Pasila locomotive stables.

== See also ==
- Railway lines in Finland
- Mall of Tripla
