= Huopalahti railway station =

Railway station in Helsinki, Finland

Huopalahti Hoplax
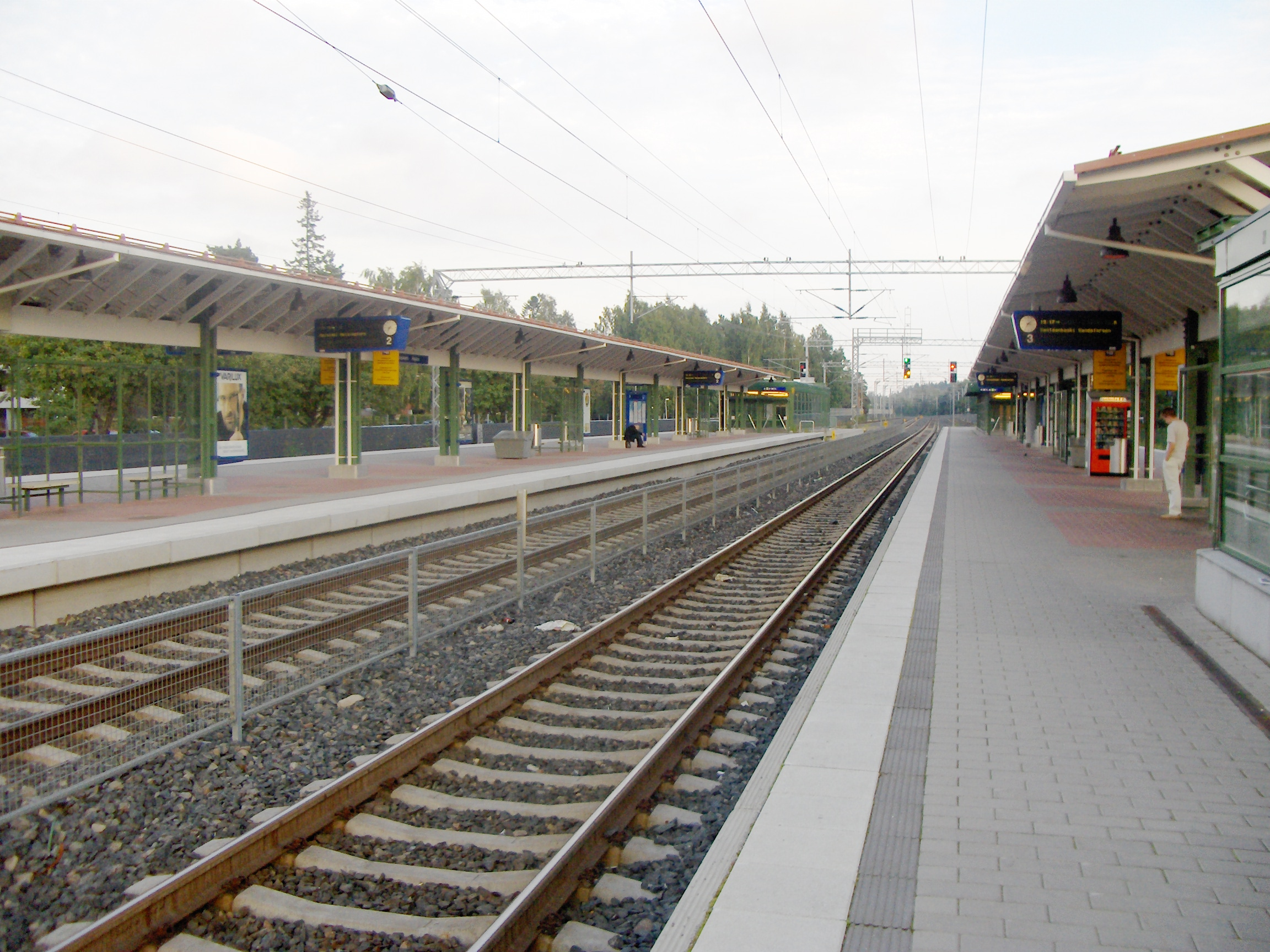

General information
- Location: Kylätie 25, 00320 Helsinki; Byavägen 25, 00320 Helsingfors
- Coordinates: 60°13′04″N 024°53′43″E
- System: Helsinki commuter rail station
- Owner: Finnish Transport Agency
- Platforms: 4
- Tracks: 4
- Connections: Light rail: 15; HSL bus line 52

Construction
- Structure type: At-grade
- Parking: Park-and-Ride
- Cycle facilities: Bicycle storage, City Bike station
- Accessible: Yes
- Architect: Bruno Granholm
- Architectural style: Jugendstil

Other information
- Station code: HPL
- Fare zone: B

History
- Opened: 1 September 1903; 122 years ago
- Electrified: 26 January 1969; 57 years ago

Passengers
- 2019: 5,276,208

Services
Preceding station	Helsinki commuter rail	Following station
Pasila towards Helsinki	Y	Leppävaara towards Siuntio
Pasila towards Helsinki	U	Leppävaara towards Kirkkonummi
Pasila towards Helsinki	E	Leppävaara towards Kauklahti
Ilmala towards Helsinki	L	Valimo towards Kirkkonummi
Ilmala towards Helsinki	A	Valimo towards Leppävaara
Pohjois-Haaga One-way operation	I counterclockwise via Tikkurila	Ilmala towards Helsinki
Ilmala One-way operation	P clockwise via Myyrmäki	Pohjois-Haaga towards Helsinki via Airport
Location

Huopalahti railway station (Finnish: Huopalahden rautatieasema, Swedish: Hoplax järnvägsstation) is a railway station on the Helsinki commuter rail network located in western Helsinki, Finland. It is located about 6 kilometres (4 mi) north/northwest of Helsinki Central railway station.

The Raide-Jokeri light rail has a stop in the station underneath the tracks, sharing facilities with bus line 52.

The Finnish Heritage Agency has classified Huopalahti railway station as a nationally significant built cultural environment.

== History ==
Huopalahti railway station was originally a small stop (known as laituri in the old classification of railway stations in Finland used until 1969) operating under the Pitäjänmäki railway station. The original Platformskjul III-type station building designed by architect Bruno Granholm was completed in 1906, but it soon ended up being way too small for the station. The plans of the current station Jugend (Art Nouveau) style building are from 1914 and the building was completed in 1921. The station building is no longer in its original use.

The station was originally located in Helsingin pitäjä (Swedish: Helsinge, the current city of Vantaa). In 1919, Huopalahti separated from Helsingin pitäjä and became its own municipality, followed by Haaga, which became an independent market town in 1923. While the station was then located in Haaga it still kept its original name. In 1946, both Huopalahti and Haaga were annexed to the city of Helsinki and the station is currently situated in the neighbourhood of Etelä-Haaga in Helsinki.

Huopalahti became a junction station in 1975, as the Martinlaakso railway line was opened. The railyard was modified in 2000–2002 during the construction of the Leppävaara urban line.

The station building and ten other buildings nearby the station were acquired by Senate Properties in 2007. The station building was bought from the Senate Properties by musician Liisa Akimof in 2013.

== Departure tracks ==
There are four tracks at Huopalahti railway station, all of which have a platform for passenger trains.

- Track 1 is used by commuter trains Y to Siuntio, U to Kirkkonummi and E to Kauklahti.
- Track 2 is used by commuter trains Y, U and E to Helsinki.
- Track 3 is used by commuter trains L, A and I to Helsinki.
- Track 4 is used by commuter trains L to Kirkkonummi, A to Leppävaara and P to the Helsinki Airport.

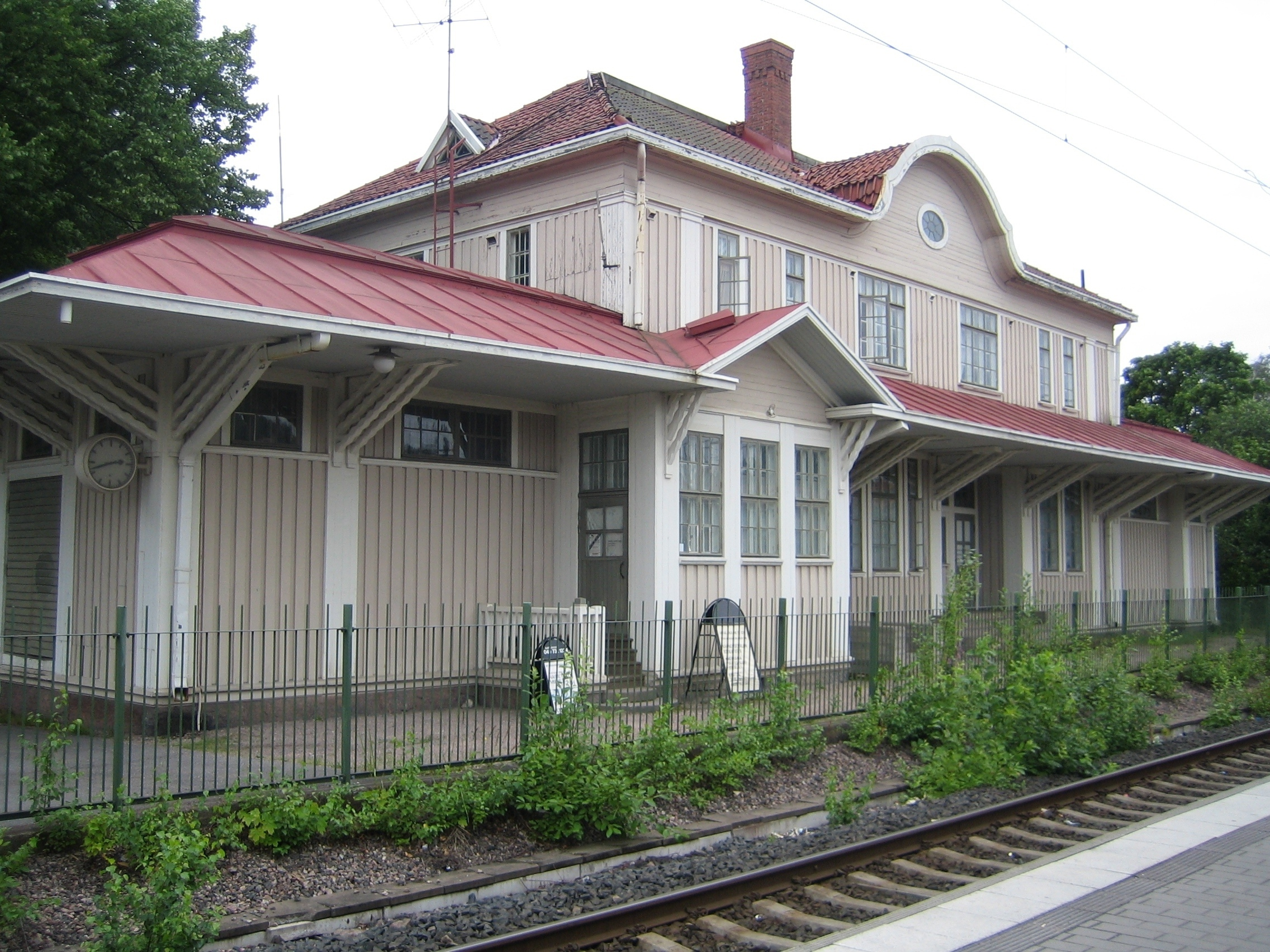
The old station building beside track 4
