= Kilo railway station =

Railway station in Espoo, Finland

Kilo
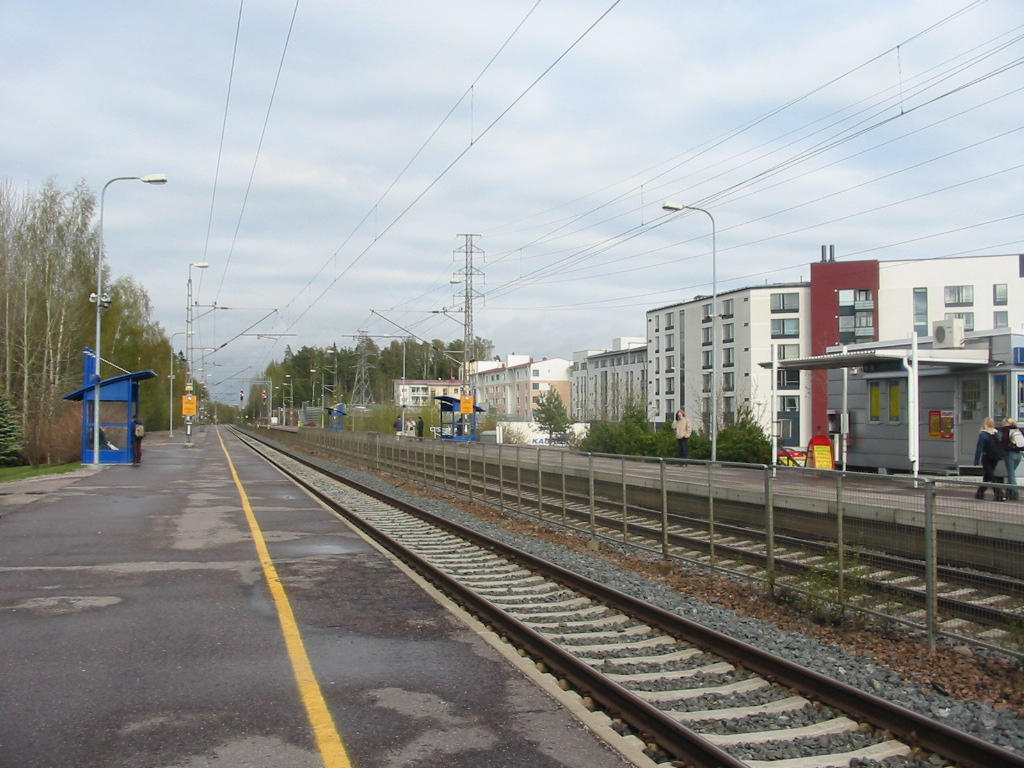

General information
- Coordinates: 60°13′3.88″N 24°46′51″E
- System: Helsinki commuter rail station
- Owner: Finnish Transport Agency
- Platforms: 2 side platforms
- Tracks: 2
- Connections: bus lines

Other information
- Station code: B

Passengers
- 2019: 1,308,519

Services
Preceding station	Helsinki commuter rail	Following station
Terminus	U	Kera towards Kirkkonummi
Leppävaara towards Helsinki	L	Kera towards Kirkkonummi
Leppävaara towards Helsinki	E	Kera towards Kauklahti
Leppävaara towards Helsinki	E	Terminus
Location

Kilo is a station on the VR commuter rail network on the Rantarata line located in Kilo, a district of the city of Espoo in Finland. It is situated between Leppävaara railway station and Kera railway station, approximately 13 kilometres (8.1 mi) northwest/west of Helsinki Central railway station.

== History ==
Kilo station has had three station buildings. The first was merely a small wood-heated cabin. The second was a larger wooden building and also included the white house of the track guardian, which still stands between the Kilo and Kera stations. This larger building was torn down in the early 1980s and replaced by a smaller sheet-metal building that served as the station's third station building. This latter building, which had been used as a kiosk since VR stopped selling tickets in Kilo at the beginning of the 2000s, has now been moved to a field across Lansanpurontie from the train station.

In the 1980s, there was a small factory south of the tracks, right next to the station, but it was torn down, and many low-rise apartment buildings have been built in its place. The level crossing to the west of the station was removed in the middle of the 1990s and replaced by a tunnel east of the station.

== Departure tracks ==
Kilo railway station has two platform tracks.

- Track 1 is used by commuter trains U and L to Kirkkonummi and E to Kauklahti.
- Track 2 is used by commuter trains U, L and E to Helsinki.

== Bus connections ==
- 114 (Leppävaara Station–Tapiola)
- 114N (Leppävaara Station–Kamppi, nighttime)
- 225K (Leppävaara–Kilo–Viherlaakso–Högnäs)
