= Mäkkylä railway station =

Railway station in Espoo, Finland

Mäkkylä
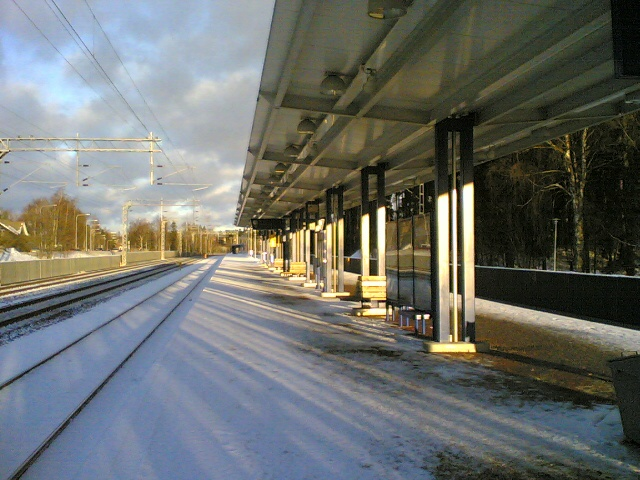

General information
- Location: Turuntie 12, 00370; Leppävaara, Espoo; Finland
- Coordinates: 60°13′16″N 24°50′35″E
- System: Helsinki commuter rail station
- Owner: Finnish Transport Infrastructure Agency
- Line: Helsinki–Turku
- Platforms: 1 island platform
- Train operators: VR on behalf of HSL

Other information
- Station code: Mäk
- Fare zone: B
- Classification: Halt

History
- Opened: 15 June 1940; 86 years ago

Passengers
- 2019: 340,999

Services
Preceding station	Helsinki commuter rail	Following station
Pitäjänmäki towards Helsinki	A	Leppävaara Terminus
Pitäjänmäki towards Helsinki	L	Leppävaara towards Kirkkonummi
Location

Mäkkylä is a station on the VR commuter rail network, between the cities of Helsinki and Espoo in Finland. It is situated between Pitäjänmäki railway station and Leppävaara railway station and is about nine kilometres northwest of Helsinki Central railway station.

== History ==
The locals of western Leppävaara had made requests regarding the opening of a halt on the rantarata numerous times since 1912; Mäkkylä was opened on 15 June 1940 on this initiative. The name was proposed by the Finnish State Railways in honor of the crown estate of Mäkkylä, from which the land around the railway in the area was gained. Initially, only westbound trains stopped on the halt due to a nearby steep incline causing issues for departing eastbound trains. Another platform for eastbound trains was eventually constructed and opened for traffic on 28 October of the same year.

The Vermo harness racing track was opened close by in 1977; previously, special trains were driven to Mäkkylä on race days. The Mäkkylä–Vermo connection was enhanced in the spring of 1983 with the opening of the pedestrian underpass on the western side of the halt.

The station was entirely rebuilt as part of the Leppävaara City Line project in 1999–2002. The station was designed by architect Kauko Lahti, while Teräsbetoni Oy was chosen as the contractor.

== Services ==
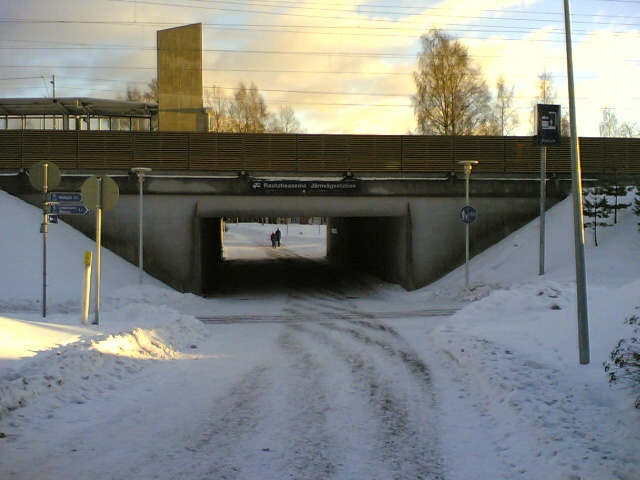
View at side of under-bridge

Mäkkylä is served by lines A to Leppävaara and L to Kirkkonummi on the Helsinki commuter rail network. Both lines make stops at all stations on their routes. The station has a HSL ticket vending machine, as well as elevators and 55 centimetres (22 in) high platforms for accessibility.

Exchanging onto HSL buses is possible on the Mäkkylän asema bus stops on the immediate western side of the station on the Turuntie street. Park and ride services are provided with two parking lots, one on the northeastern side of the station on Fonseenintie and another on the southwestern side on Perkkaantie. The latter is also accompanied by a city bike terminal.

Previously, travellers to Mäkkylä from Espoo could use an Espoo internal ticket, and travellers from Helsinki could use a Helsinki internal ticket. However YTV changed this, and after 28 August 2005 Mäkkylä is considered within Espoo. As a result, travellers from Helsinki require a regional ticket (Finnish: seutulippu, Swedish: regionbiljett). In the present, Mäkkylä and its surrounding bus stops are part of HSL fare zone B.

== Departure tracks ==
Mäkkylä railway station has four tracks, of which two (3, 4) have platforms for passenger trains. Tracks 1–2 are used by trains that skip the station.

- Track 3 is used by A and L trains to Helsinki.
- Track 4 is used by A trains to Leppävaara and L to Kirkkonummi.
