= Huopalahti =

Huopalahti Hoplax
- Former municipality
- Huopalahden kunta Hoplax kommun
- Location of Huopalahti in Finland (1935).
- Interactive map of Huopalahti
- Location within Uusimaa Location within Finland Location within Europe
- Coordinates: 60°12′09″N 24°52′04″E
- Country: Finland
- Province: Uusimaa Province
- Region: Uusimaa
- Established: 1920
- Consolidated to Helsinki: 1946

Area
  - Total: 12.3 km^{2} (4.7 sq mi)

Population (1931)
  - Total: 2,377
  - Density: 193/km^{2} (501/sq mi)

Languages
  - Finnish: 1441 inhabitants
  - Swedish: 1044
  - Others: 121

Huopalahti (Swedish: Hoplax) is a former municipality of Finland located in Uusimaa region. The municipality operated between 1920–1945. Huopalahti was consolidated to Helsinki as a part of the municipal expansion of the city in 1946.

The Finnish National Defence University, that was moved to Munkkiniemi in 1923, was located in Huopalahti.

== Regional structure ==
Areas of Munkkiniemi, Lauttasaari and parts of northern Pasila were parts of Huopalahti. The area was separated from former Helsinki parish in 1920. At first Haaga was part of the municipality, but was separated from it in 1923. This resulted northern Pasila to become an exclave of the municipality. Huopalahti railway station and church also remained part of Haaga.

Island of Lauttasaari was practically an exclave of Huopalahti municipality. There was no straight transport connection inside the municipality between mainland Munkkiniemi and the island. Lehtisaari Island, which was then a part of Helsingin maalaiskunta, separated Lauttasaari and Munkkiniemi geographically.

== Population ==
In 1935 Huopalahti had 2,635 residents living in the municipality. Regionally the population developed as follows:

| Year | Area | | | Total |
| Year | Lauttasaari | Munkkiniemi | Pasila (Note: Includes Haaga in 1920, which was separated in 1923.) | Total |
|---|---|---|---|---|
| 1920 | 333 | 304 | 2,429 | 3,066 |
| 1925 | 1,065 | 373 | 212 | 1,650 |
| 1930 | 1,121 | 1,042 | 206 | 2,247 |
| 1935 | 967 | 1,469 | 199 | 2,635 |

== Sports ==
The Finnish Hunting Society which is headquartered in the city hosted the shotgun shooting events in Huopalahti for the 1952 Summer Olympics.

== See also ==
- Huopalahti railway station
