= Leppävaara railway station =

Railway station in Espoo, Finland

Leppävaara Alberga
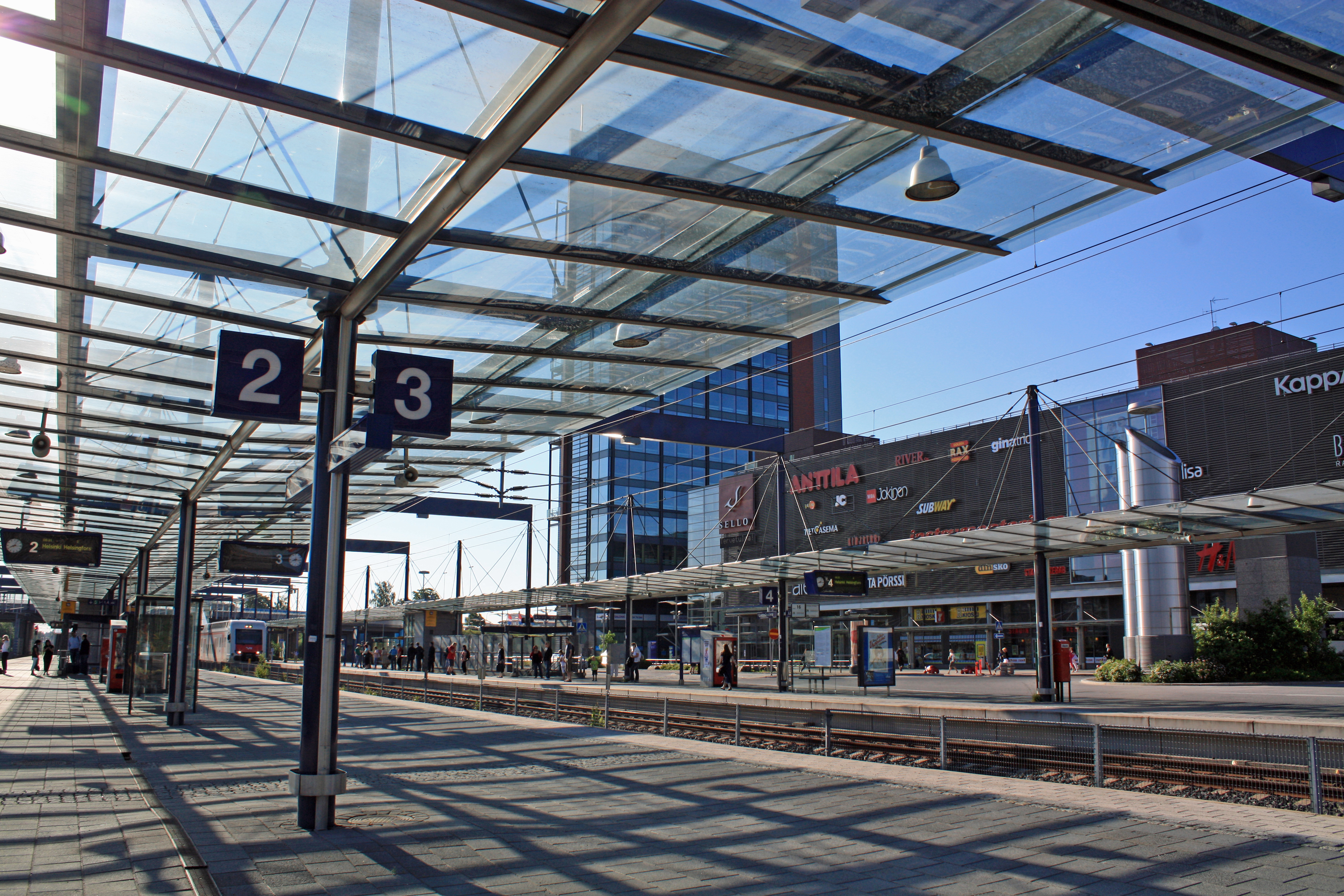

General information
- Location: Leppäpolku 1 02600 Espoo
- Coordinates: 60°13′10″N 24°48′54″E
- System: VR station
- Owner: Finnish Transport Agency
- Platforms: 1 island platform 2 side platforms
- Tracks: 4
- Connections: Light rail: 15; Bus lines 113/N, 114/N, 200 , 201/B, 202, 203/N/V, 207, 214/T, 215/A, 217, 218, 219, 224, 226/A, 227/N/V, 229, 231N, 235N, 236/K/V, 238/B/K/T, 239/T, 275, 280, 502, 532, 543, 544, 550 , 553/K, 555/B

Construction
- Accessible: 6

Other information
- Fare zone: B

History
- Opened: 1903; 123 years ago

Passengers
- 2019: 7,370,247 (Helsinki commuter)

Services
Preceding station	Helsinki commuter rail	Following station
Huopalahti towards Helsinki	Y	Espoo towards Siuntio
Huopalahti towards Helsinki	U	Kilo towards Kirkkonummi
Mäkkylä towards Helsinki	L	Kilo towards Kirkkonummi
Huopalahti towards Helsinki	E	Kilo towards Kauklahti
Mäkkylä towards Helsinki	A	Terminus
Preceding station	VR commuter rail	Following station
Pasila towards Helsinki	H Limited service	Espoo towards Hanko
Preceding station	VR Group	Following station
Pasila towards Helsinki	Helsinki–Turku	Kirkkonummi towards Turku Harbour
Location

Leppävaara station (Finnish: Leppävaaran rautatieasema, Swedish: Alberga järnvägsstation) is a railway station located in Leppävaara, a district of the city of Espoo in Finland. It is located about 11 kilometres (7 mi) to the northwest of Helsinki Central.

== History ==
Near the construction site of the Rantarata line was the financial building of the Alberga Manor. In 1905, the municipality of Espoo sought permission to build a railway stop in place of the manor, but this permission was denied. However, suburban settlement rapidly started appearing near the manor, so it was necessary to build a railway stop.

Leppävaara station was built in 1903 and the first station building in 1907. In 1920, a tightly-populated community was founded from the suburban area according to a zoning plan made by Lars Sonck. The suburban settlement also spread to the north of the station, where the Harakka area was founded, now known as the district of Lintuvaara.

Traffic arrangements at the Leppävaara railway station were changed in 1965, when a rapidly trafficked local road was drawn over the tracks via an overpass bridge; the Ring I beltway currently runs at the site. The station area started to become a population centre, where a modern Maxi-Market store was opened in 1972. Cargo traffic at the Leppävaara railway station was discontinued in 1975, but passenger traffic was improved by building an underpass tunnel in the following year.

The greatest change occurred in autumn 1999 when the station building was torn down to build a new railroad track in Leppävaara and a new terminal. The significance of the Leppävaara railway station has increased in the 21st century as many bus lines previously going to Helsinki have been directed to Leppävaara to serve as feeder traffic for local commuter trains.

The Sello shopping centre has brought more traffic to the station since late 2002, the latter part having been completed in autumn 2005. The shopping centre is located right next to Leppävaara station.

== Connections ==
All local trains to Siuntio (Y and X trains), Kirkkonummi (U train) and Kauklahti (E train) stop at Leppävaara, in addition to all Pendolino and InterCity services from Helsinki to Turku and Turku Satama (Turku Harbour). Long-distance trains between Helsinki and Turku have stopped at Leppävaara since 25 October 2015, before this they stopped at Espoo railway station in Espoon keskus.

The construction of the new track in 2002 caused part of the train schedules and stops to be rearranged, and introduced the A train, stopping at all stations.

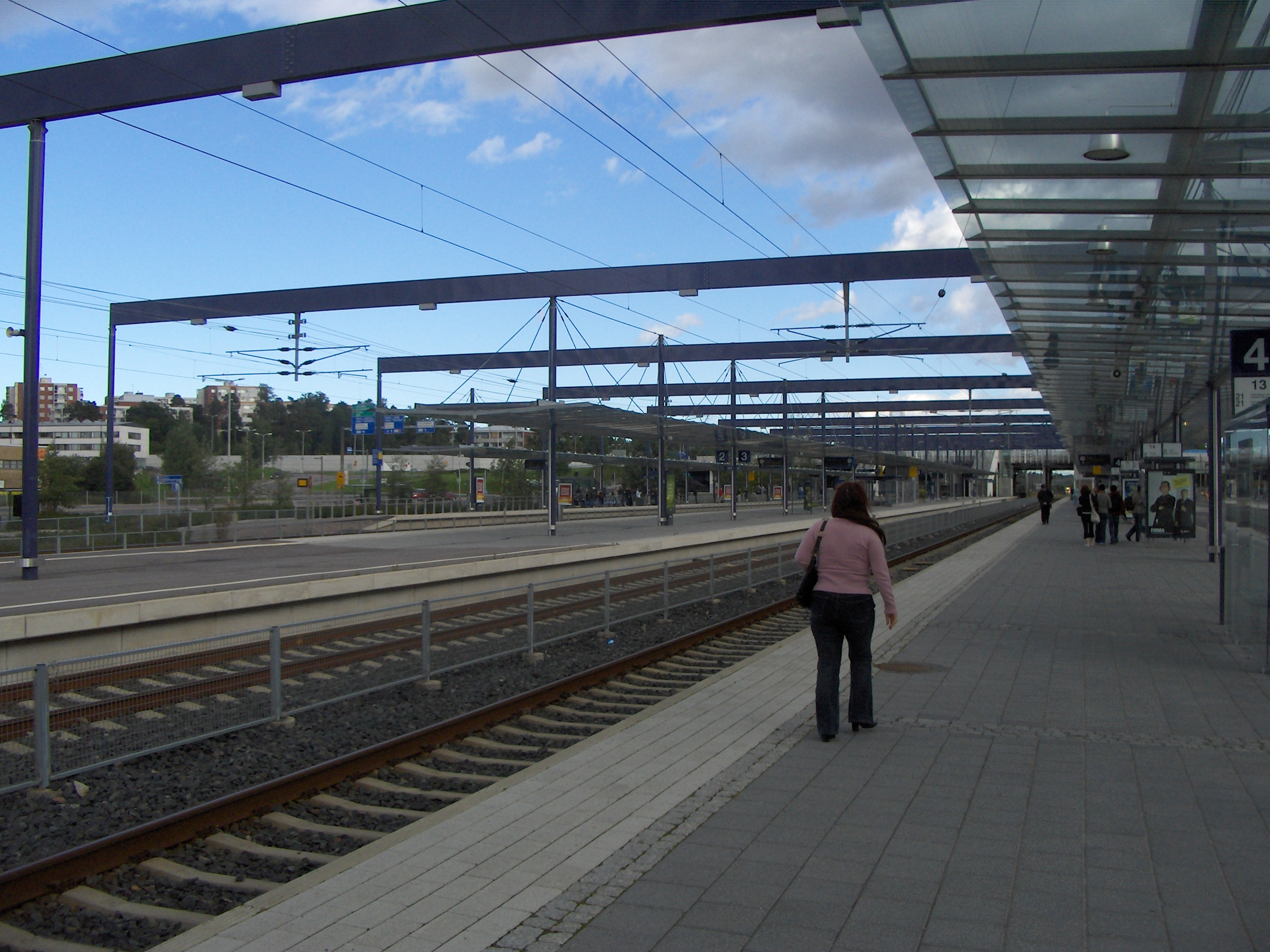
View of track 4

== Service ==
Service	Content
Disability Support Service	There is a support service available at the station. For inquiries from VR Customer Care, tel. 08001 66888 (free of charge) no later than 48 hours before departure.
Assistance point	The assistance point is located near the lift in the middle of platform 4. The assistance point is sheltered. Taxis and short-term parking are located near the assistance point.
Parking	Sello Shopping Center, HSL Parking and Ride
Station Service	Raised station platforms, passenger information system, R-kioski store.

== Departure tracks ==
There are four tracks at the Leppävaara railway station all of which have a platform for passenger trains.

- Track 1 is used by commuter trains E to Kauklahti, U to Kirkkonummi, Y to Siuntio and H to Hanko as well as by westbound long-distance trains to Turku.
- Track 2 is used by commuter trains E, U, Y and H as well as by eastbound long-distance trains to Helsinki.
- Track 3 is used by A line commuter train to Helsinki departing at 06:26 on weekday mornings.
- Track 4 is used by commuter trains A and L to Helsinki as well as by the commuter train L to Kirkkonummi.
