= Bruno Granholm =

Finnish architect

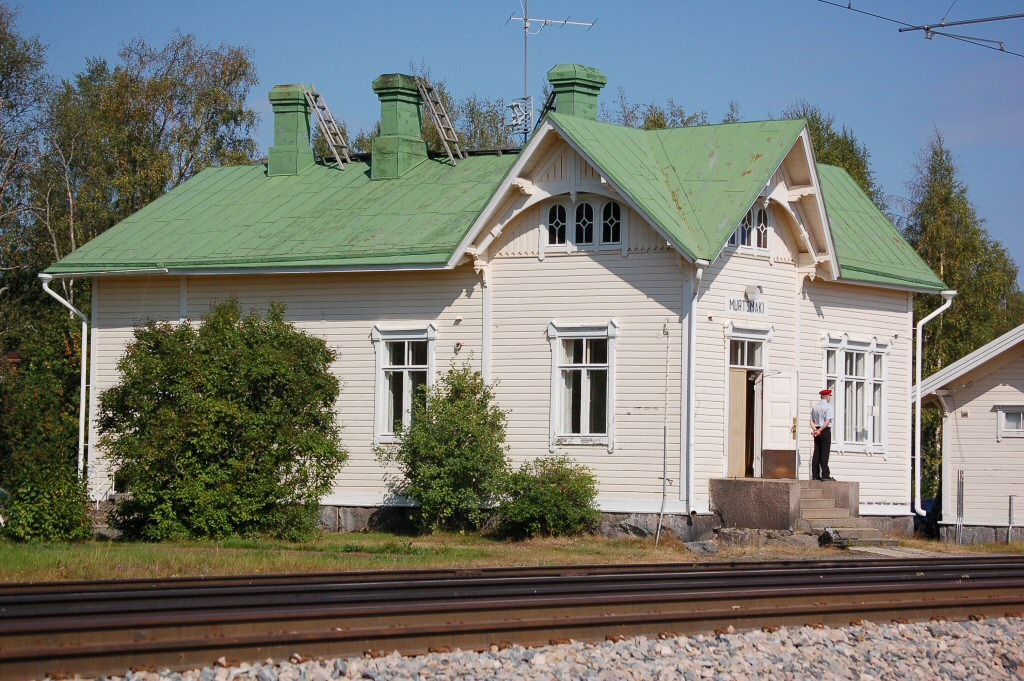
The Murtomäki station building designed by Granholm

Bruno Ferdinand Granholm (May 14, 1857 in Myrskylä – September 29, 1930) was a Finnish architect. He served as the chief architect of Rautatiehallitus (The Railroad Board) between 1892 and 1926. Many of the station buildings he designed are still in use today, having aged surprisingly well.

Granholm designed the station buildings for the Haapamäki–Jyväskylä, Jyväskylä–Suolahti, Helsinki–Turku, Kuopio–Iisalmi, Oulu–Tornio, Iisalmi–Kajaani and Savonlinna–Elisenvaara tracks. Buildings constructed from his plans can also be found on other routes, e.g. Levashovo of the Riihimäki-Saint Petersburg railroad (within Saint Petersburg).

Granholm's buildings are strongly influenced by the Romantic nationalist concepts of the era, such as asymmetry and generous carvings, and can often be positively distinguished from the surrounding buildings.
