= Rantarata =

Railway line in Finland

Overview
- Line number: A, E, I, L, P, U, X, Y
- Termini: Helsinki Central; Turku Harbour
- Stations: 28

Service
- Route number: 1

History
- Opened: 1902

Technical
- Line length: 195.8 km (121.66 mi)
- Number of tracks: Quad (Helsinki–Leppävaara); Double (Leppävaara–Kirkkonummi, Kupittaa–Turku); Single (Kirkkonummi–Kupittaa)
- Track gauge: 1,524 mm (5 ft)
- Electrification: 25 kV @ 50 Hz
- Operating speed: 120 to 200 km/h (75 to 124 mph)

Rantarata (the Coastal Railway, Swedish: Kustbanan), is a railway running between Helsinki Central Station and Turku Central Station in Finland. Its first segment, linking Turku to Karis, was commissioned in 1895, and work began the following year. The Turku–Karis track was opened for temporary traffic on 1 April 1899 and for permanent use on 1 November 1899. The second part of the Rantarata, linking Karis to Helsinki, was approved in 1897 and opened for traffic in 1902–1903.

The track was built to primarily serve commuter traffic and was therefore laid out with many curves and as few tunnels and expensive earthworks as possible. This resulted in a series of corrections and straightening of curves, a work which began in the 1910s and continued all the way to the 1990s.

As a part of the original plan, all of the stations along the Rantarata featured wooden station houses designed by the architect Bruno Granholm. Over the years many of these wood station building had been dismantled to make way for newer structures, such as Leppävaara railway station in 1999. Some of the old buildings still remain, Kauniainen railway station being the most significant example.

The track between Helsinki and Kirkkonummi was upgraded with 25 kV AC railway electrification during the 1960s, and was the first government-owned electrified railway line in Finland. Together with other improvements and maintenance, the Kirkkonummi–Karis track received its overhead lines in 1994. Coinciding with the purchase of VR Group's first VR Class Sm3 "Pendolino" high-speed trains, the remaining track between Karis and Turku Harbour was electrified in 1995, completing the route.

The passenger service to Uusikaupunki was abolished in the early 1990s, while freight traffic continues through the Port of Uusikaupunki. Work to electrify the line to Uusikaupunki was scheduled to begin in 2019, leading to the possibility of passenger service being reinstated.
