= List of railway lines in Finland =

Major railroads in Finland in 2010. Passenger and freight traffic Freight traffic only Discontinued

This is a list of railway lines on the Finnish rail network, including lists of stations on the most important lines. The lines and the stations are owned by the Finnish Transport Agency. VR Group has a monopoly on passenger transport. As of 2011, it is the only operator of freight trains as well even though freight transport is open for private companies.

== Passenger lines ==
=== Helsinki–Turku (Rantarata/Kustbanan) ===
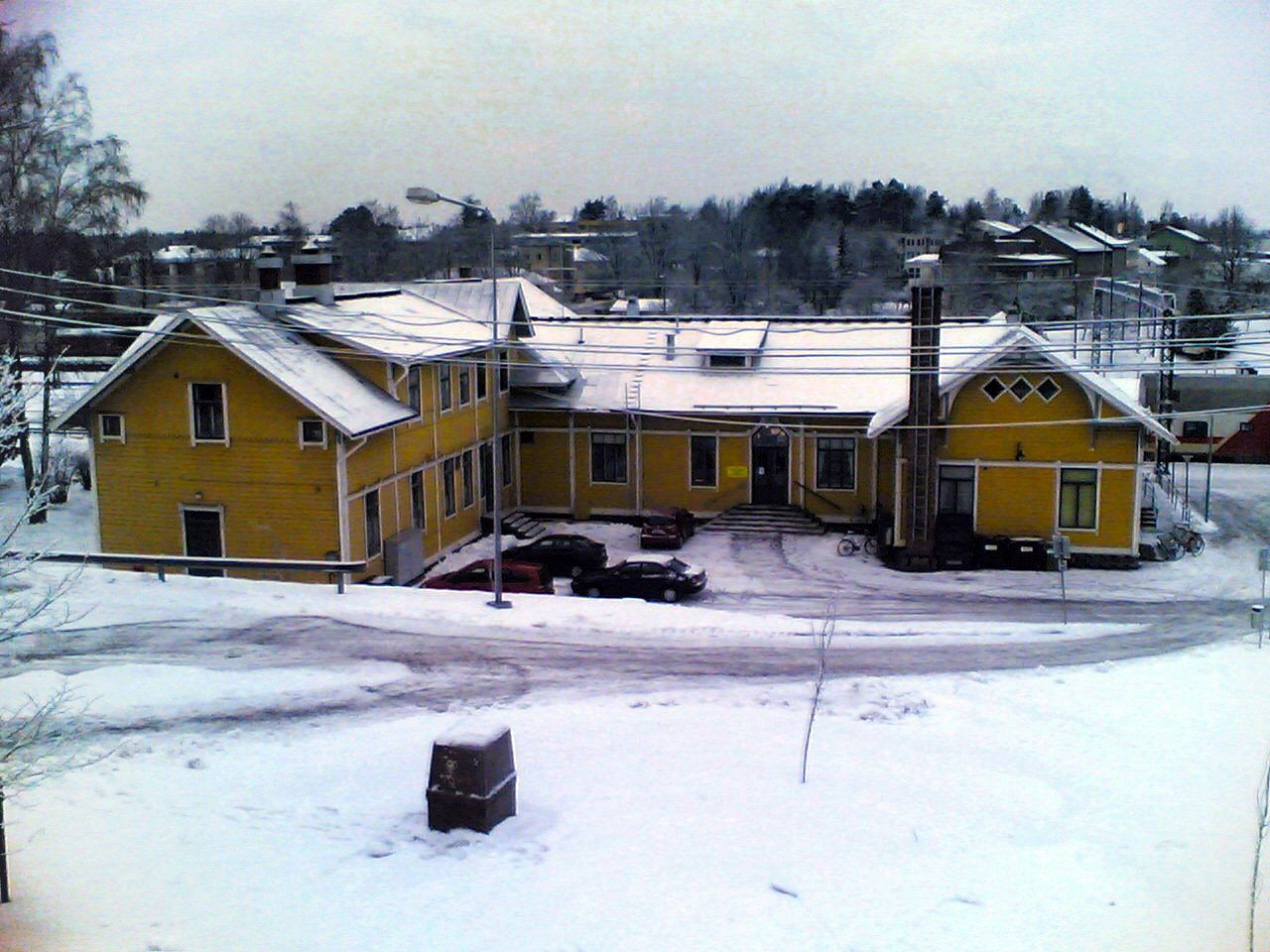
Karis railway station, operational since 1873

Image	Station name	Opened	km
	Helsinki Central	1860	0+159
	Pasila	1862	3+230
	Leppävaara	1903	20+600
	Kirkkonummi	1903	37+503
	Karis	1873	87+56
	Salo	1898	143+981
	Kupittaa	1914	196+372
	Turku Central	1876	199+674
	Turku Harbour	1876	202+510

=== Turku–Pieksämäki ===
- Turku Harbour
- Turku Central
- Loimaa
- Humppila
- Toijala
- Tampere
- Orivesi
- Jämsä
- Jyväskylä
- Hankasalmi
- Pieksämäki

=== Helsinki–Oulu ===
- Helsinki Central
- Pasila
- Tikkurila
- Lahti
- Kouvola
- Mäntyharju
- Mikkeli
- Pieksämäki
- Suonenjoki
- Kuopio
- Siilinjärvi
- Lapinlahti
- Iisalmi
- Sukeva
- Kajaani
- Vaala
- Utajärvi
- Muhos
- Oulu

=== Helsinki–Nurmes ===
- Helsinki Central
- Pasila
- Tikkurila
- Lahti
- Kouvola
- Lappeenranta
- Joutseno
- Imatra
- Simpele
- Parikkala
- Kesälahti
- Kitee
- Joensuu
- Eno
- Uimaharju
- Vuonislahti
- Lieksa
- Kylänlahti
- Höljäkkä
- Kohtavaara
- Nurmes

=== Savonlinna–Parikkala ===
- Savonlinna (current)
- Pääskylahti
- Kerimäki
- Retretti
- Lusto
- Punkaharju
- Parikkala

== Other lines ==
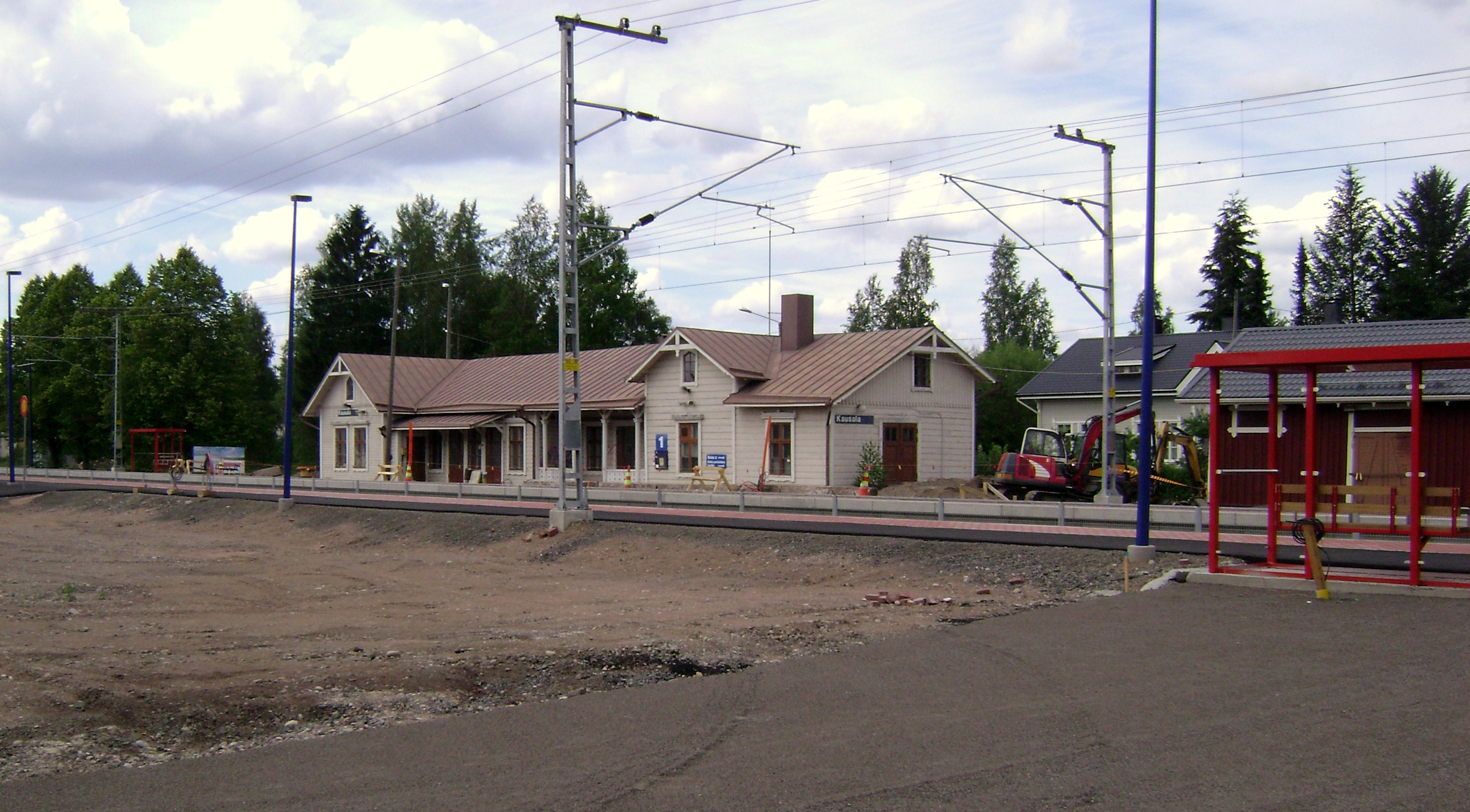
Kausala Railway Station along the Lahti–Kouvola railway in Kausala, Iitti

- Karis–Hanko (Hanko–Hyvinkää railway)
- Helsinki–Tampere
- Turku–Tampere–Jyväskylä–Joensuu
- Tampere–Haapamäki–Seinäjoki
- Helsinki–Kotka
- Helsinki–Kuopio–Oulu
- Iisalmi–Ylivieska

== Future lines ==
- Arctic Railway
- Helsinki City Rail Loop
- Helsinki–Turku high-speed railway
- Itärata
- Lentorata
