= Salo railway station =

Railway station in Salo, Finland

Salo
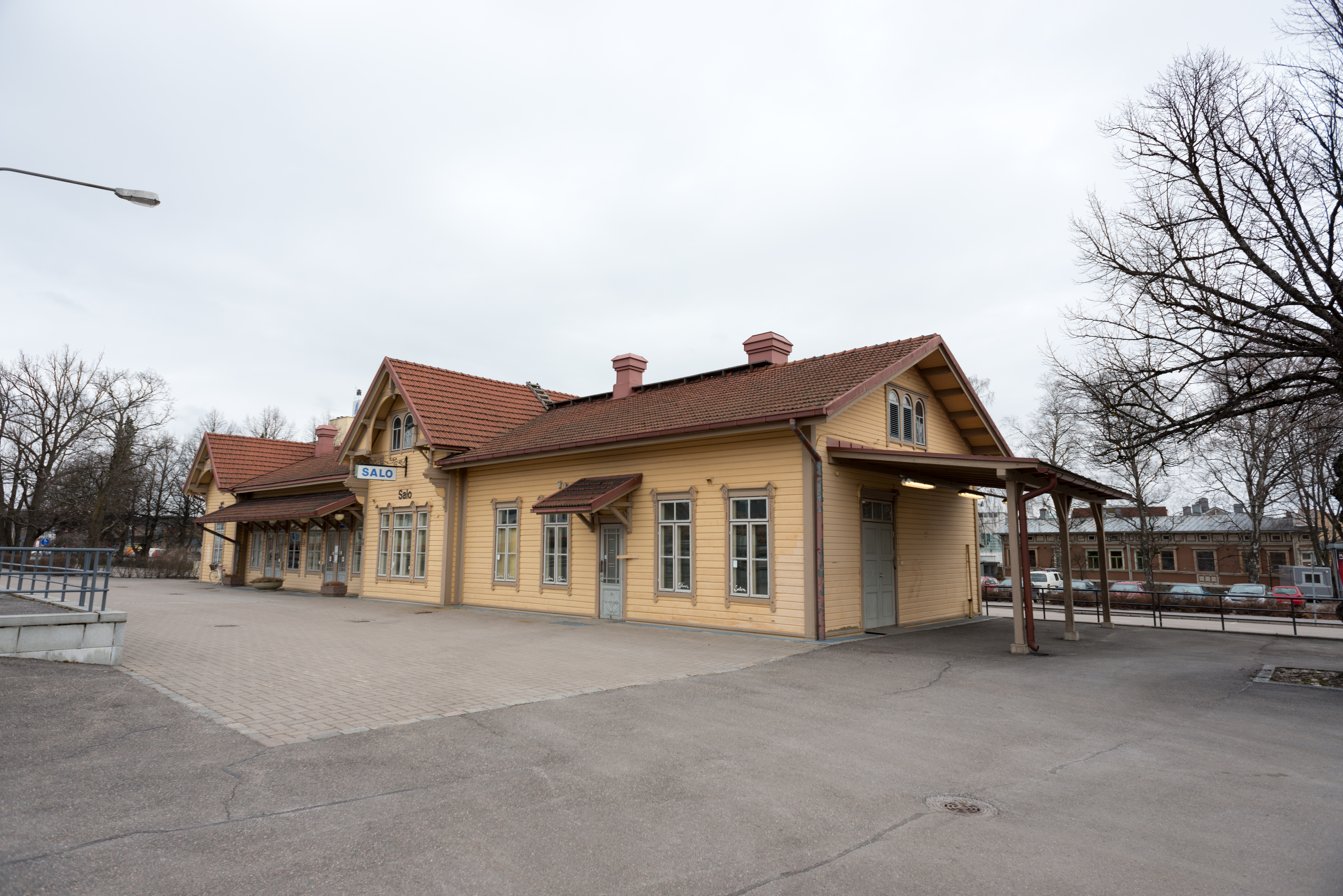

General information
- Location: Rautatieasema; 24100 Salo
- Coordinates: 60°23′05″N 023°07′18″E
- System: VR station
- Owner: Finnish Transport Agency

Construction
- Structure type: ground station

History
- Opened: 1898

Passengers
- 2018: 328,000

Services
Preceding station	VR Group	Following station
Karis towards Helsinki	Helsinki–Turku	Kupittaa towards Turku Harbour
Location

Salo railway station (Finnish: Salon rautatieasema, Swedish: Salo järnvägsstation) is located in the town of Salo in the Southwest Finland region, Finland. All passenger trains between Helsinki and Turku stop at Salo, and the station also serves cargo traffic. About 320 thousand passengers use the station every year. Inside the station, there is one automatic ticket vending machine. The station has three elevated platforms for passenger traffic, and for going underneath the tracks, there is a tunnel, with exits by stairs and elevator.

The distance east to the Ervelä cargo station is 25 kilometres and west to the Paimio cargo station is 29 kilometres. The distance to Turku is 56 kilometres and the distance to Helsinki is 144 kilometres.

The Finnish Heritage Agency has classified Salo railway station as a nationally significant built cultural environment.

== History ==
Salo railway station has been the most significant station between Karis and Turku ever since the construction of the railway line. Train traffic to Salo began on February 1898, as the Turku–Karis railway line was opened. The station building designed by architect Bruno Granholm was completed in 1899. Small modifications has since been to the building, but primarily it has been preserved in its original form.

Along the 20th century, there were plans to turn Salo into a junction station, with a new railway line terminating either at Somero, Riihimäki or Vanjärvi at Vihti. The latter option would have connected Salo to the planned Pitäjänmäki–Loimaa-line. When the Porkkala Naval Base was leased to the Soviet Union in 1944, there were plans of a new railway line to be built from Huopalahti to Salo via Ojakkala station in Vihti. When Porkkala was returned to Finland in 1956, there was no longer a hasty demand for the Huopalahti–Salo-line, but the planning for another possible railway line to Salo via Lohja (the so-called Elsa-line) began in 1965.

The station building was renovated in 1983, but in the 1990's there were plans to build a completely new station building, which ended up being discarded. The railyard was rebuilt in the 1990's along with an underpass tunnel completed in 1994.

The Salo railway station was the VR Group's Station of the Year in 2005. The choice of Salo as the winner was based on increased sales (9% improvement over last year), quality of customer service, and cleanliness of the station.

== Departure tracks ==
Salo railway station has three platform tracks. Track 3 is currently unused by passenger trains that stop at the station.

- Track 1 is used by long-distance trains to Helsinki
- Track 2 is used by long-distance trains to Turku.

== See also ==
- Railway lines in Finland
