= Kupittaa railway station =

Railway station in Turku, Finland

Kupittaa Kuppis
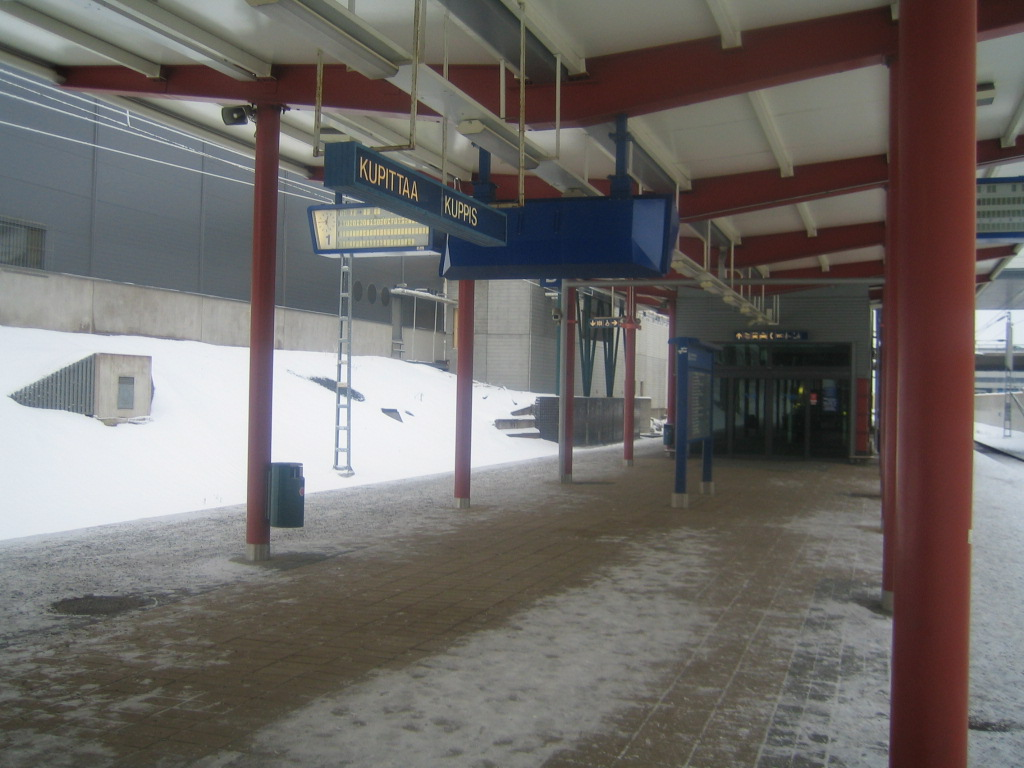

General information
- Location: Joukahaisenkatu 6 FI-20520 Turku
- Coordinates: 60°27′02″N 022°17′49″E
- System: VR station
- Owner: Finnish Transport Agency
- Line: long-distance trains
- Platforms: 1
- Connections: bus lines 32, 42, 58, 110

Construction
- Structure type: bridge station
- Accessible: 2

Services
Preceding station	VR Group	Following station
Salo towards Helsinki	Helsinki–Turku	Turku towards Turku Harbour
Location

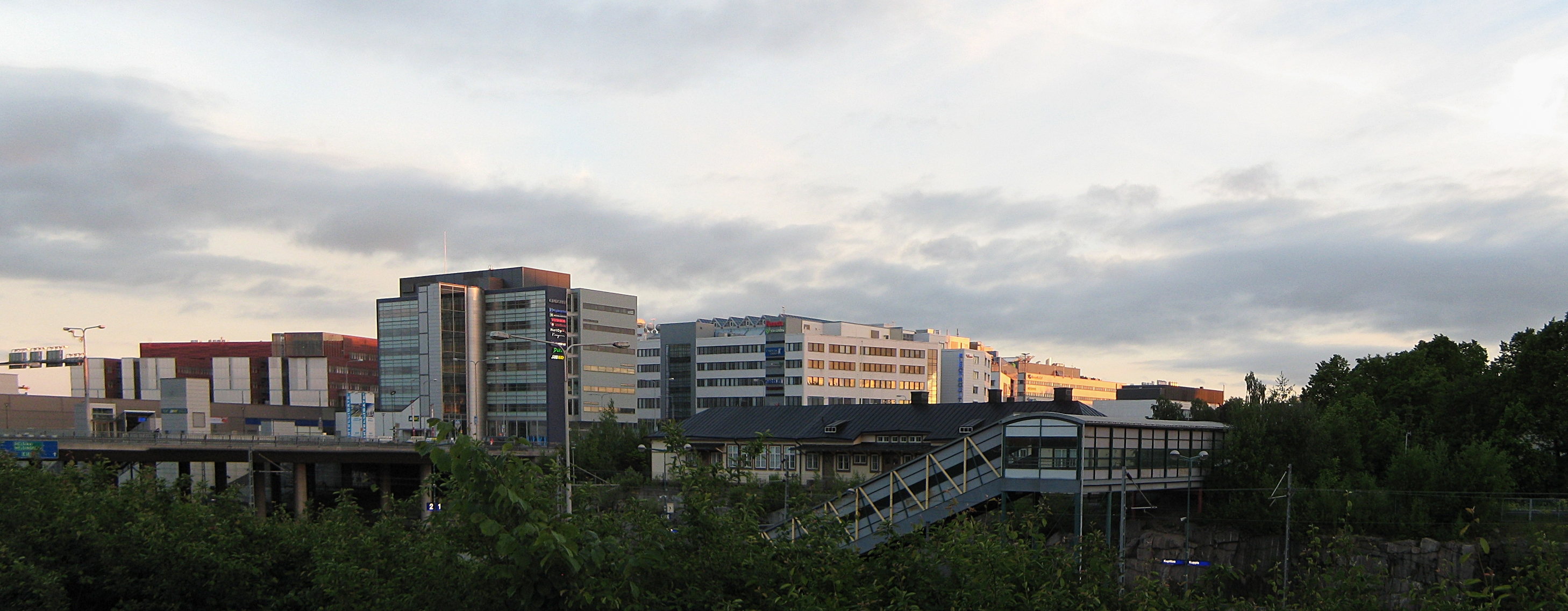
Kupittaa railway station is located near business and education cluster Science Park

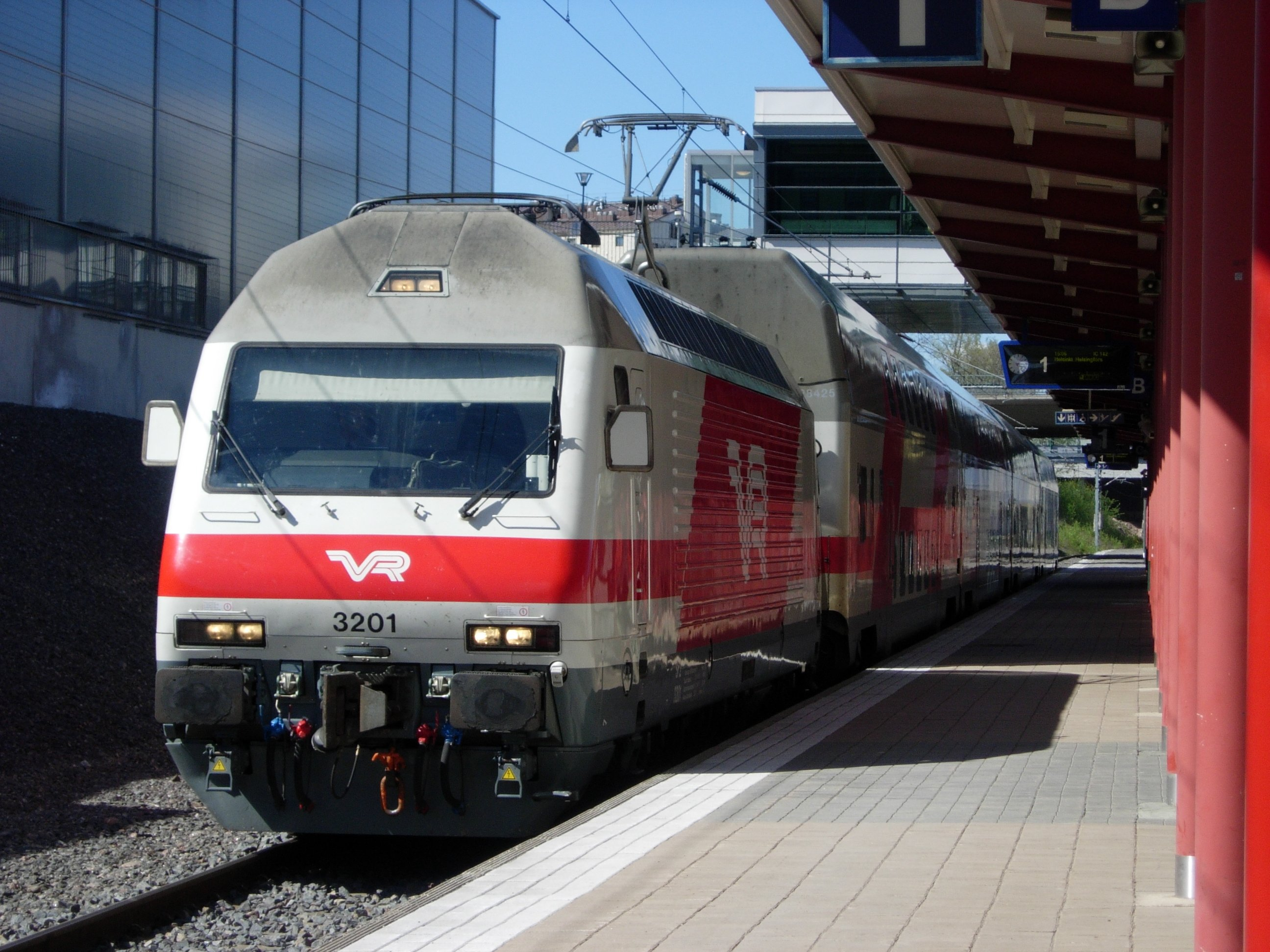
Train heading to Helsinki at Kupittaa railway station

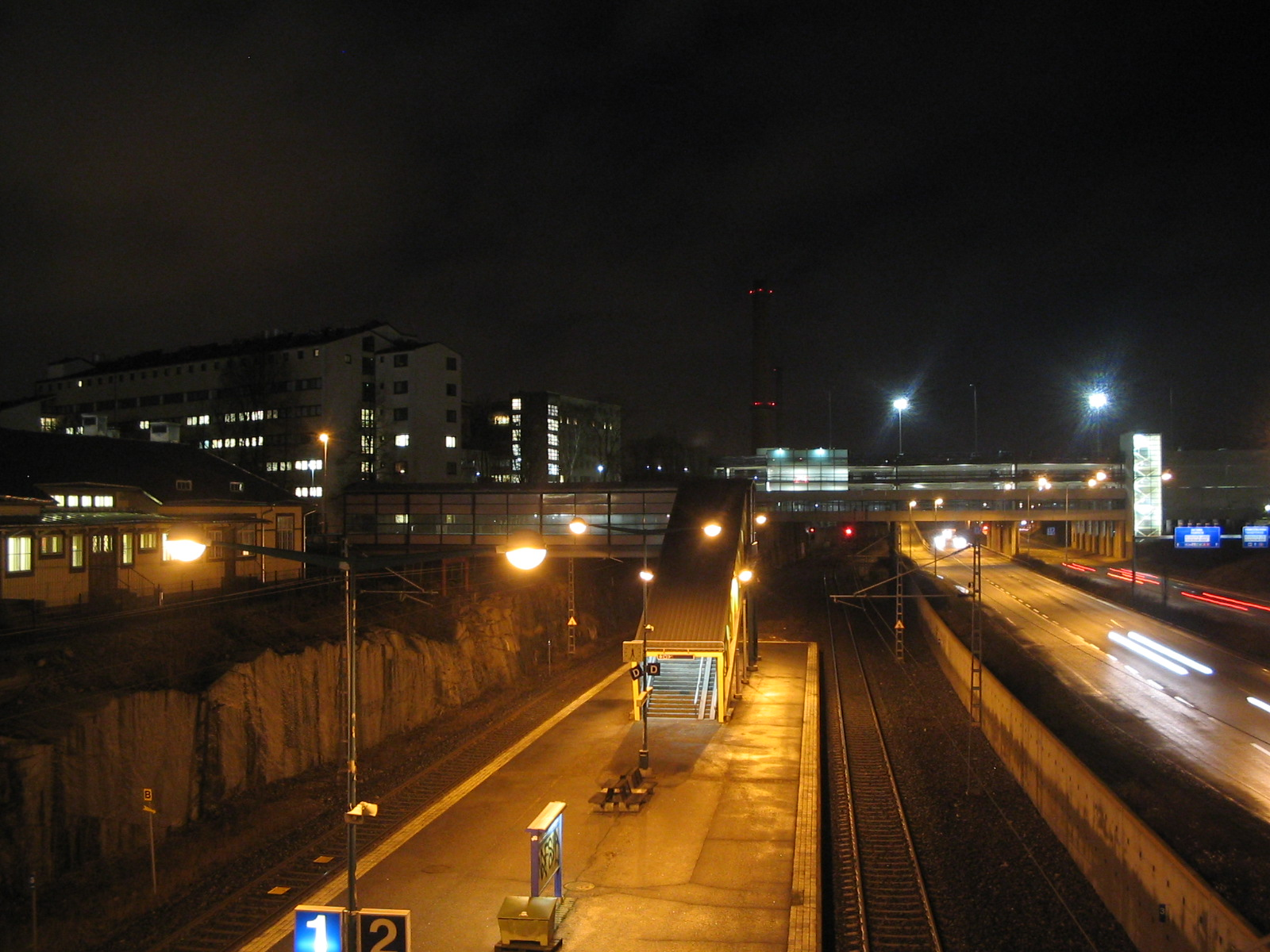
Passenger connection from the platform at Kupittaa railway station to the street level

Kupittaa railway station (Finnish: Kupittaan rautatieasema, Swedish: Kuppis järnvägsstation) is located in the Kupittaa district of Turku, Finland. The station is located about three kilometres from the Turku Central railway station in the immediate vicinity of the Turku Science Park. All trains between Helsinki and Turku stop at Kupittaa. Signalling is handled from Turku Central railway station. The station has bus connections to Föli lines 32, 42, 58 and 110.

The old station building at Kupittaa dates back to 1914 and is located about a hundred metres to the northwest of the current station. The building was designed by John Stolpe. The previous name of the station, used until 1946, was Turku Itäinen (Swedish: Åbo Östra). All trains between Helsinki and Turku stop at Kupittaa.

== History ==
The Kupittaa railway station was built an area that was already tightly populated; the Turku Cathedral is located only about a kilometre to the west from the station. To the east of the station was the populated area of Nummi, which used to belong to the municipality of Kaarina but was annexed to Turku in 1939. In the 1920s cargo tracks were built from the station to the log sawmill, to the brick factory and to the concrete foundry. In 1949, a side track was built near the station to the Itäharju industrial area built between the World Wars, but it fell out of use as transport moved from trains to cars, and in 1993 it was dismantled to make way for the new Turku-Helsinki highway. The Kupittaa station was demoted to a line transport office under the control of the Turku Central Station in 1963.

Passenger traffic at the Kupittaa railway station ended after commuter traffic on the Rantarata line closed down in 1979. There were no passenger trains stopping at the station from 26 May 1979 to 17 August 1986, or from 15 August 1987 to 28 May 1988. After that day all passenger trains on the Rantarata line started stopping at Kupittaa again. The new station building was built in 1995. In the early 1990s, the station was supposed to be named Data Stop after the technology centre Data City located next to it, but in the end the station kept its old name.

The old wooden station building at Kupittaa, built in 1914, fell out of use of the VR Group when the current station was built in late 1994. The new station was inaugurated on 12 January 1995.

The valuable wooden building was not dismantled, and it has since served as a restaurant among other uses. Along with the construction of the new station building at Kupittaa, the entire railway track was moved about seven metres lower than the old railway track. The new station was built above the track. A new bridge was built over the track to replace the old level crossing. A new lining of the Finnish national road 1 was built along the track. Various new buildings have been built near the station, hosting business spaces and premises for universities and the Turku University Hospital.

The line between Kupittaa and Turku was widened to double track between 2021 and 2024.

== Services ==
Ticket sales at the station were closed on 2 August 2014, but the station has two automated ticket sales machines inside and one outside.

A hotel was opened next to the station in July 2020. The hotel is named Original Sokos Hotel Kupittaa and its front lobby has direct access to the station.

== Departure tracks ==
Kupittaa railway station has an island platform with tracks (1, 2) on either side.

- Track 1 is used by long-distance trains to Helsinki.
- Track 2 is used by long-distance trains to Turku Central Station.

== See also ==
- Railway lines in Finland
