= Humppila railway station =

Railway station in Humppila, Finland

Humppila
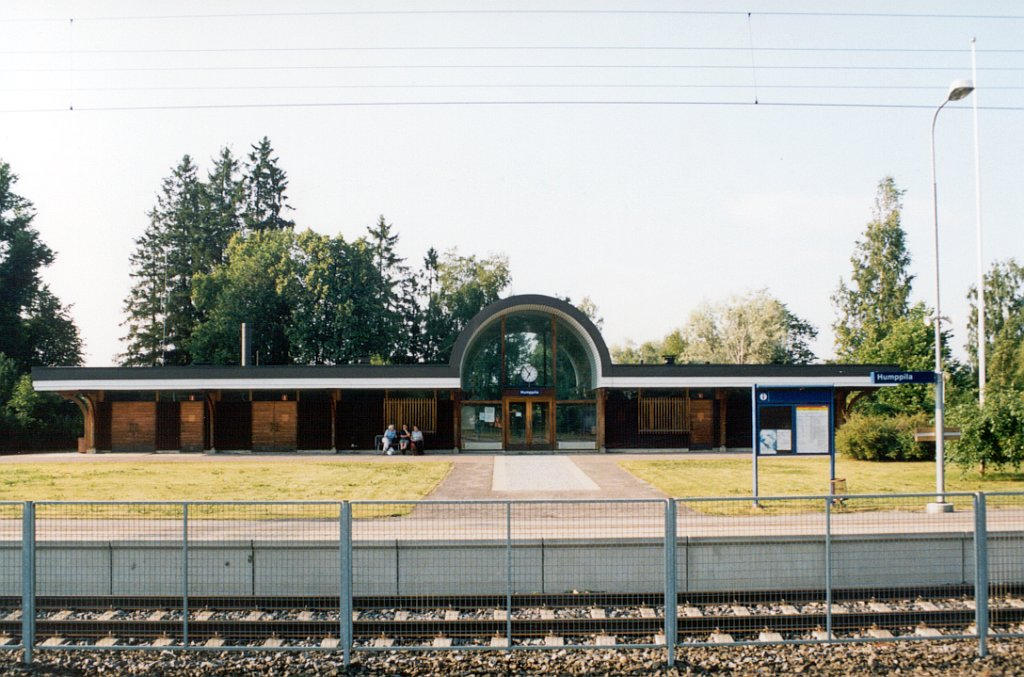
- The Humppila railway station in July 2003.

General information
- Coordinates: 60°55.177′N 23°21.747′E
- System: VR station
- Owner: Finnish Transport Agency
- Tracks: 3

History
- Opened: 1876

Passengers
- 26 000 (v. 2008)

Services
Preceding station	VR Group	Following station
Loimaa towards Turku Harbour	Turku–Toijala	Toijala Terminus
Location

Humppila railway station (Finnish: Humppilan rautatieasema; Swedish: Humppila järnvägsstation) is located in the municipality of Humppila in the region of Kanta-Häme in Finland.

The original station building on the track between Turku and Toijala was destroyed in a fire in 1973 after a failed attempt to rob a post office. Apparently the robbers were scared of something, and when they ran away, the accidentally left their welding flame on.

Humppila was without a proper station building for nearly a decade, because the new building designed by Mauri Liedenpohja was only completed in 1983. Before this, traffic control was handled from a cargo warehouse.

The station is nowadays unstaffed. The traffic control is handled remotely from the Tampere railway station. Ticket sales were discontinued in March 2000. Passenger trains between Turku and Tampere still stop at the station. This is partly because the station is about halfway between the Turku Central railway station and the Toijala railway station, so trains having left at the same time meet at the station. Many trains do meet at Humppila regularly. Another reason why passenger traffic has been retained in Humppila is because inhabitants of Forssa and people visiting there have a practical train connection from Humppila. The distance is about 20 kilometres. There is regular bus traffic between Forssa and Humppila, and express buses between Helsinki and Pori also stop there. Forssa can also be reached by car via Finnish National Road 2.

The station building is currently owned by Humppila municipality, and is open on weekdays. There are no ticket sales at the station, not even a ticket vending machine.

Humppila is a place where the past and the present meet at summer Sundays, because Humppila is a terminus of the Jokioinen Museum Railway.

== Departure tracks ==
Humppila railway station has three platform tracks. Trains that stop at the station primarily use track 1. When two passenger trains meet at the station, trains to Turku mainly use track 1, meanwhile trains to Tampere use track 2.

== See also ==
- Jokioinen Railway
- Jokioinen Museum Railway
- Humppila museum railway station
