= Kalaranta railway station =

Former railway station in Uusikaupunki, Finland

Kalaranta
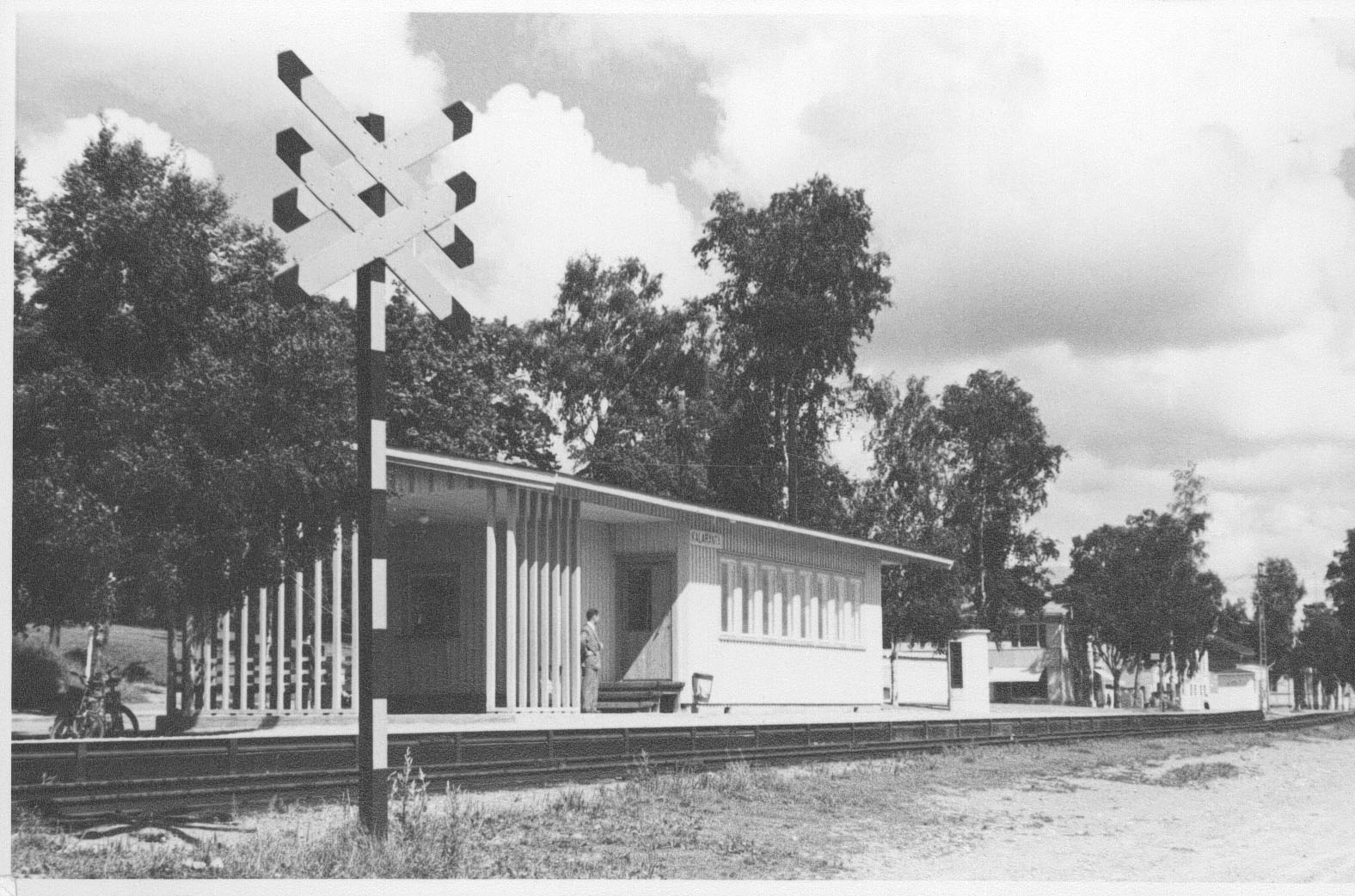

General information
- Location: Rantakatu, 23500; Uusikaupunki; Finland
- Coordinates: 60°47′56″N 021°24′40″E
- System: Closed VR station
- Owner: Finnish Transport Infrastructure Agency
- Line: Turku–Uusikaupunki
- Tracks: 1
- Train operators: VR Group

Other information
- Station code: Kt

History
- Opened: 1 January 1933
- Closed: 1 January 1993
Location

The Kalaranta railway station (Finnish: Kalarannan rautatieasema, Swedish: Kalaranta järnvägsstation) is a closed station located in the town of Uusikaupunki, Finland. It was located along the Turku–Uusikaupunki railway, and functioned as the terminus of passenger services on the line from 1933 to 1993. The nearest station with passenger services is Turku in the southwest.

== History ==
Kalaranta was founded as a halt on 1 January 1933 to act as the new terminus on the Uusikaupunki line, due to the town's main station being located far from its center. A small waiting room was built to accommodate passengers. Initially, the halt was located on the western side of the Siltakatu bridge; in 1956, the halt was rebuilt and repositioned to the bridge's east, with a larger station building being constructed.

Kalaranta was promoted to a staffed halt on 1 June 1962, and ticket sales services were initiated. The volume of sales exceeded that of the Uusikaupunki station: for example, in 1963, 1,700 tickets were sold at Kalaranta, while at Uusikaupunki, the figure was just 550. From then, the train dispatcher at Uusikaupunki also occasionally worked from Kalaranta.

Ticket sales at Kalaranta ceased on 1 October 1991, and passenger services on the entire Uusikaupunki railway ceased on 1 January 1993, which also marked the disestablishment of Kalaranta as an operating point. The old platform still remains at the site of the former halt.
