= Humppila museum railway station =

Railway station in Humppila, Finland

Humppila
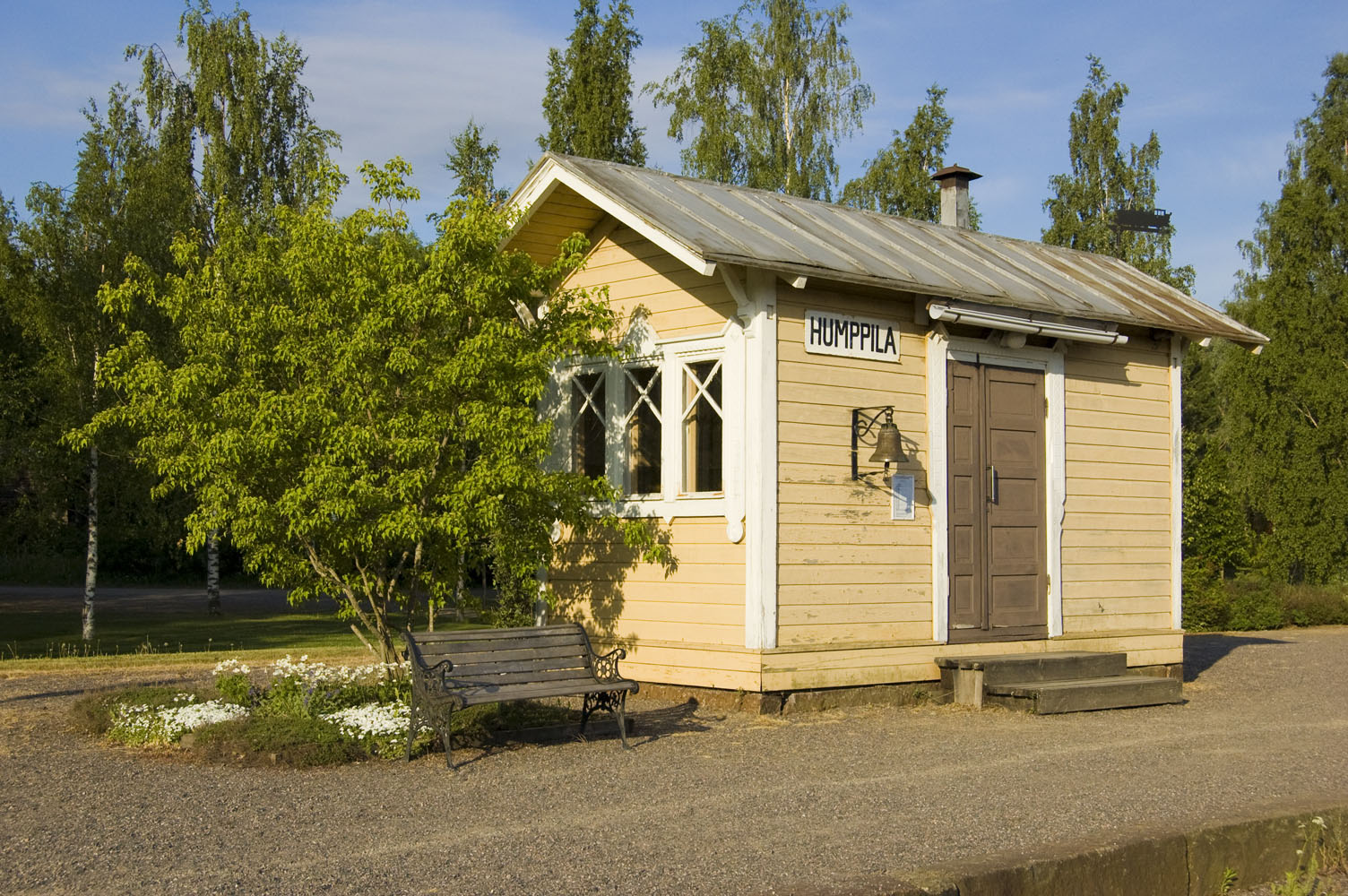

General information
- Location: Paanarinteentie 13, 31640 Humppila
- Coordinates: 60°55′09″N 23°22′02″E
- System: Heritage railway station
- Owner: Jokioinen Museum Railway
- Platforms: 1

History
- Opened: 1994 (original station opened in 1898 further west)
Route map
Location

Humppila museum railway station or Humppila-Museorautatie by its official designation is the northernmost railway station at the end of the line of Jokioinen Museum Railway. The station is located in Humppila municipality in Finland, and it is located almost directly across the tracks of Turku–Tampere railway line from Humppila railway station.

The station is located approximately 300 metres (330 yards) east from the original Jokioinen Railway passenger platform. The original narrow gauge station in Humppila was opened in 1898 and closed in 1974, and the tracks between Minkiö and Humppila were lifted in 1975. This eight-kilometre (five-mile) section was rebuilt during 1992–1994 and opened for traffic on June 5, 1994. Due to the ongoing underpass work at broad gauge railyard, the current museum railway station had to be founded due east from the original location.

Originally the Jokioinen Railway did not have a station building in Humppila. The Humppila railway station on the broad gauge national line served both railroads until Jokioinen Railway was closed in 1974.

The current museum railway station building originally stood at Matku railway station.
