= Loimaa railway station =

Railway station in Loimaa, Finland

Loimaa
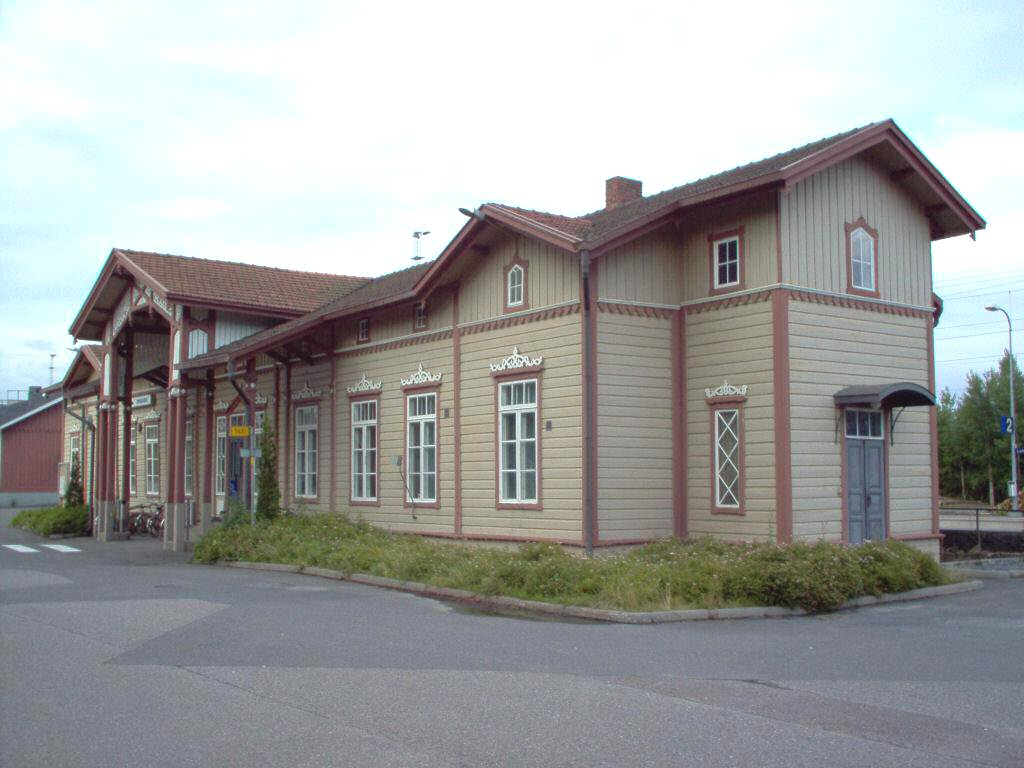
- The Loimaa railway station.

General information
- Location: Asemakatu, 32200; Loimaa; Finland
- Coordinates: 60.847503°N 23.059959°E
- System: VR station
- Owner: Finnish Transport Infrastructure Agency
- Line: Turku–Toijala railway
- Tracks: 2

Construction
- Architect: Knut Nylander (?)
- Architectural style: Renaissance Revival

History
- Opened: 1876

Services
Preceding station	VR Group	Following station
Turku towards Turku Harbour	Turku–Toijala	Humppila towards Toijala
Location

Loimaa railway station (Finnish Loimaan rautatieasema; Swedish Loimaa järnvägsstation) is located in the town of Loimaa, Finland. The station is located almost exactly halfway between the Turku Central and Toijala railway stations, making it an important place along the track.

The station is located in the central area of the town of Loimaa, at the crossing point of the railroad, Finnish National Road 9 and Finnish local road 213. All passenger trains stop at Loimaa, and it also serves cargo traffic.

The Finnish Heritage Agency has classified Loimaa railway station as a nationally significant built culturual environment.

== History ==
Loimaa railway station is one of the original stations opened on the Turku–Toijala railway line in 1876. Loimaa station was also the most significant of the intermediate stations on the railway, being the only Class III station.

The Renaissance Revival style station building, likely designed by Knut Nylander (who was the building designer of Finnish State Railways at the time), was completed in the same year as the station was opened. Loimaa station also had two locomotive sheds, out of which the first one was moved to Humppila in 1902 and the second one was demolished. The original water tower located at the station was exploded during the Finnish Civil War and a similar water tower was built at Humppila after the war.

The area surrounding the station soon grew into a significant centre of population. A sawmill was established near the station in 1877, followed later by a brick factory, a leather factory, a beer factory and a mill, among others. Around the time of Finland's independence, Loimaa already resembled a market town with its stores, banks, chapels and electric lights. The station village along with the village near Vesikoski mill was eventually made into a market town in 1922.

By the end of the 19th century, there were plans to make Loimaa into a junction station by building a new railway line from Helsinki to Peipohja station (current Kokemäki), offering a more direct train connection to Pori. In the 1920s, there were even plans about building a railway line from Loimaa to Riihimäki. Both of the plans were eventually withdrawn in the 1930s, due to the increase of bus traffic.

Loimaa station became remotely controlled in 2000, but the ticket sales office remained open until 2008.

== Departure tracks ==
Loimaa railway station has two platform tracks. All passenger trains that stop at the station currently use track 1.
