= Ervelä railway station =

Former railway station in Salo, Finland

Ervelä
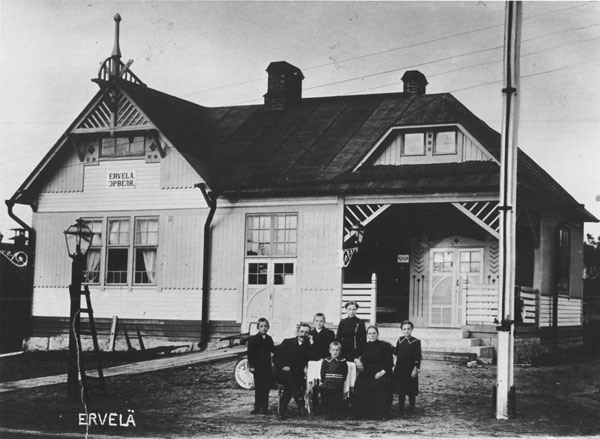
- Ervelä in 1913

General information
- Location: Ervelä, Salo; Finland
- Coordinates: 60°13′23.7″N 23°11′00.7″E
- System: Closed VR station
- Owner: Finnish Transport Infrastructure Agency
- Line: Helsinki–Turku
- Train operators: VR Group

Other information
- Station code: Erv
- Classification: Operating point

History
- Opened: 16 October 1909
- Closed: 1 January 1982
Location

The Ervelä railway station (Finnish: Ervelän rautatieasema, Swedish: Ervelä järnvägsstation) is a station located in the village of Ervelä in the town of Salo (formerly the municipality of Perniö), Finland. It is located along the Helsinki–Turku railway, and is currently only used as a passing loop; the nearest station with passenger services is Salo in the north.

== History ==
=== First station ===
Ervelä was opened as a laituri (a staffed halt, translating to "platform") on 16 October 1909, from the initiative of a local retail cooperative first made in 1907. While the initially proposed locations for the station were kilometer markers 120 and 123, it was initially placed further east from the latter option, at 122.27 kilometres (75.98 mi) from Helsinki. Later on, it became apparent that the station's location could not accommodate a rail yard, and so in 1919, the station was moved further west to the approximate location of kilometer marker 123, as had been proposed before. This also prompted the moving of the station building to the northern side of the railway, from its south.

Passenger services in Ervelä were discontinued on 22 May 1977, and the only remaining switch was dismantled in November 1981, which prompted the cessation of the operating point on 1 January 1982. The station and its former siding were however briefly used during trackwork operations in 1987.

=== As a passing loop ===
After further trackwork on the Helsinki–Turku line starting from 1989, Ervelä was reopened as a passing loop in 1992, approximately 4 kilometres (2.5 mi) to the east from the site of the old Ervelä station. The location of the line shifted notably in the vicinity of the old station, and thus the station building now lies further away from the railway than it did before.

== Architecture ==
The station building in Ervelä was constructed in 1909, and is representative of Jugendstil in its architecture. In 2006, the old station premises were purchased from the Railway Administration by a private buyer, who has since worked on renovating and restoring the station building.
