= Turku–Toijala railway =

Railway line in Finland

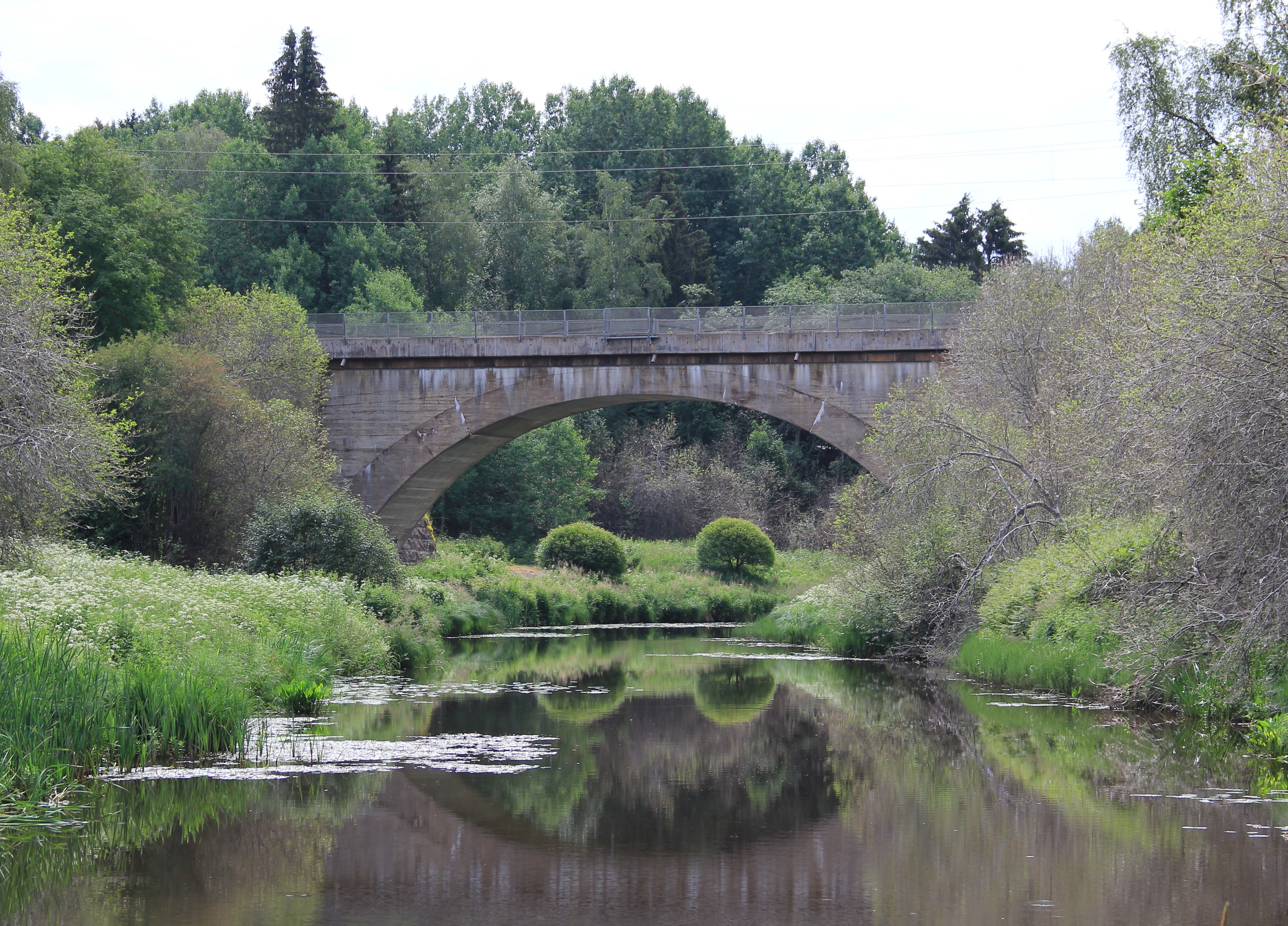
- The Aurajoki railway bridge in Aura

Overview
- Status: Open
- Owner: Finnish government
- Locale: Southwest Finland; Kanta-Häme; Pirkanmaa
- Termini: Turku; Toijala

Service
- Operator(s): VR Group

History
- Opened: 22 June 1876

Technical
- Line length: 131 km (81 mi)
- Number of tracks: 1
- Track gauge: 1,524 mm (5 ft)
- Electrification: 25 kV @ 50 Hz

The Turku–Toijala railway (Finnish: Turku–Toijala-rata, Swedish: Åbo–Toijala-banan) is a 1,524 mm (5 ft) railway in Finland. Running through the regions of Southwest Finland, Kanta-Häme and Pirkanmaa, it connects the junction stations of Turku and Toijala in the southwest–northeast direction.

== History ==
Around the time of the completion of the Helsinki–Hämeenlinna railway – the first of its kind in Finland – planning its extensions towards the south to Turku and north to Tampere became relevant. The northern terminus of the former route was subject to debate; in time, the village of Toijala was chosen as a compromise. The two branches were inaugurated at the same time, on 22 June 1876.

== Services ==
VR Group operates long-distance services with InterCity and Pendolino type rolling stock on the line. All of these services call in Loimaa and Humppila on their route.
