= Savonlinna railway station =

Railway station in Savonlinna, Finland

Savonlinna Nyslott
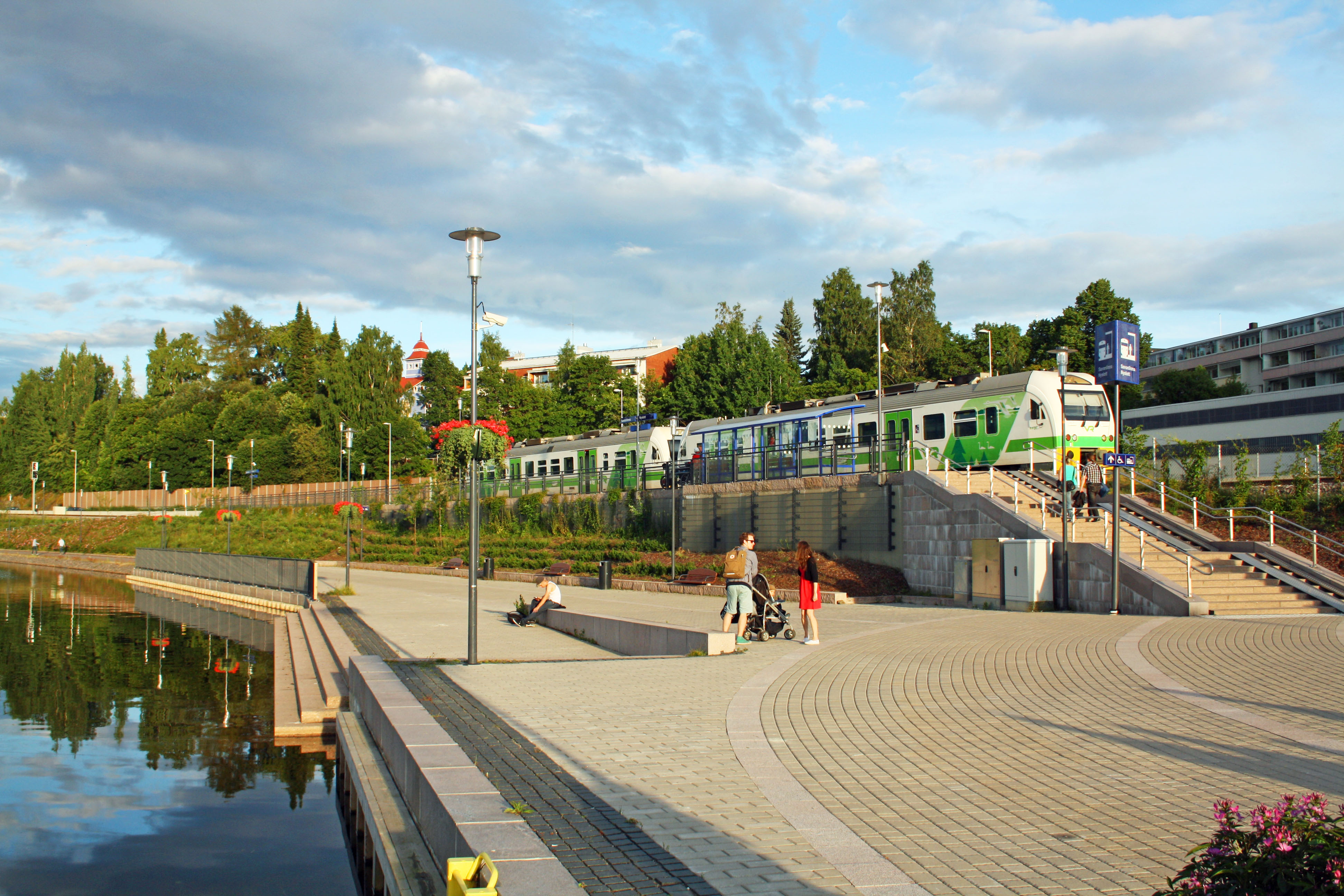

General information
- Location: Kauppatori; Savonlinna; Finland
- Coordinates: 61°52′08″N 028°53′12″E
- System: VR station
- Owner: Finnish Transport Infrastructure Agency
- Operator: VR Group
- Line: Huutokoski–Parikkala
- Platforms: 1 side platform
- Tracks: 1

Other information
- Station code: Sl
- Classification: Part of split operating point (Savonlinna)

History
- Opened: 15 October 1932
- Former names: Koululahti (until 1 June 1955); Savonlinna-Kauppatori (1 June 1955–12 December 2011)

Services
Preceding station	VR Group	Following station
Terminus	Savonlinna–Parikkala	Pääskylahti towards Parikkala
Location

The Savonlinna railway station (Finnish: Savonlinnan rautatieasema, Swedish: Nyslott järnvägsstation; formerly Savonlinna-Kauppatori) is located in the town of Savonlinna, Finland. It is located along the Huutokoski–Parikkala railway, and its only neighboring station is Pääskylahti in the west.

== History ==
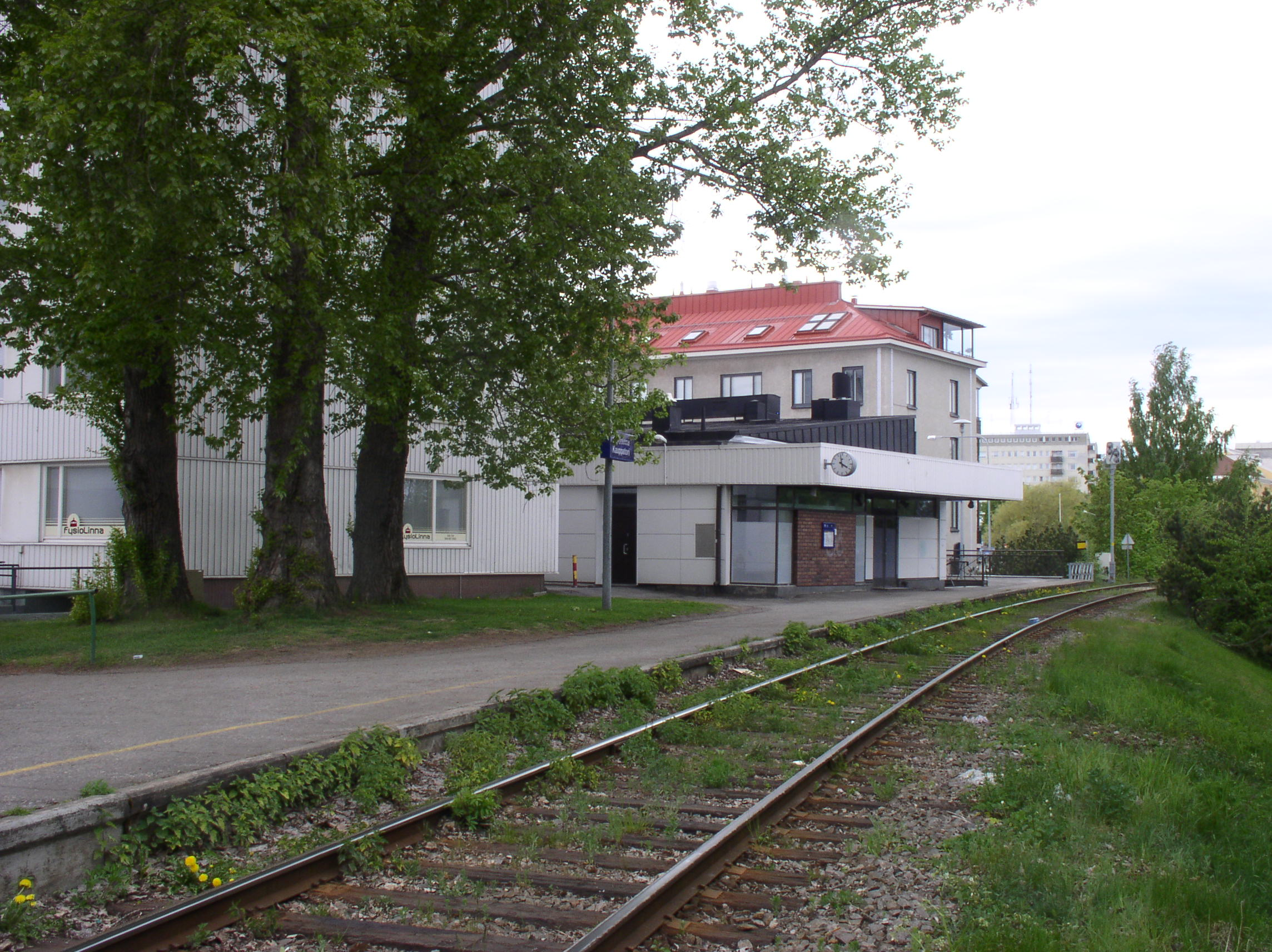
Savonlinna-Kauppatori in June 2008

As the Savonlinna–Elisenvaara railway was built, the Savonlinna station was placed on the western outskirts of the town; this stemmed from the town center's location on small, splintered islands on the lake Saimaa, and it could not accommodate a large rail yard. To alleviate the effects of the issue on passenger transport, the Koululahti halt was opened on the north side of the town center on 15 October 1935. In 1944, the station was elevated to the status of a staffed halt, and in 1955, it was renamed Savonlinna-Kauppatori, highlighting its location in the middle of the town (kauppatori translating to "market square" from Finnish).

Due to the rebuilding of a section of Finnish national road 14 near Savonlinna, the directly adjacent part of the Huutokoski-Parikkala railway had to be moved as well. On 12 December 2012, the Savonlinna-Kauppatori halt as well as the central railway station of Savonlinna were closed. During this interim period, the newly reopened station of Pääskylahti became the terminus of the regional trains from Parikkala. On 16 June 2012, Savonlinna-Kauppatori became the new terminus of the passenger services on the line, and was renamed Savonlinna, coinciding with the old central station being closed permanently.

Savonlinna became a de facto terminus of the Huutokoski–Parikkala line after the Laitaatsalmi bridge was dismantled in 2015.

== Architecture ==
In 1943, a small station building designed by Anna Schröder was constructed, and in 1956, it was extended by building a warehouse. It was replaced with a new one in 1965, which also housed ticket sale services. The latter building, having fallen out of use long ago and having accumulated moisture damage, was demolished in October 2021.

== Services ==
Savonlinna is one of the termini of the Savonlinna–Parikkala regional train route; the default type of rolling stock for this route is the Dm12 railbus. The station has a VR ticket machine, as well as an accessible 55 centimetres (22 in) high platform.
