= Siilinjärvi railway station =

Railway station in Siilinjärvi, Finland

Coordinates: 63.0751°N 27.6660°E

Siilinjärvi
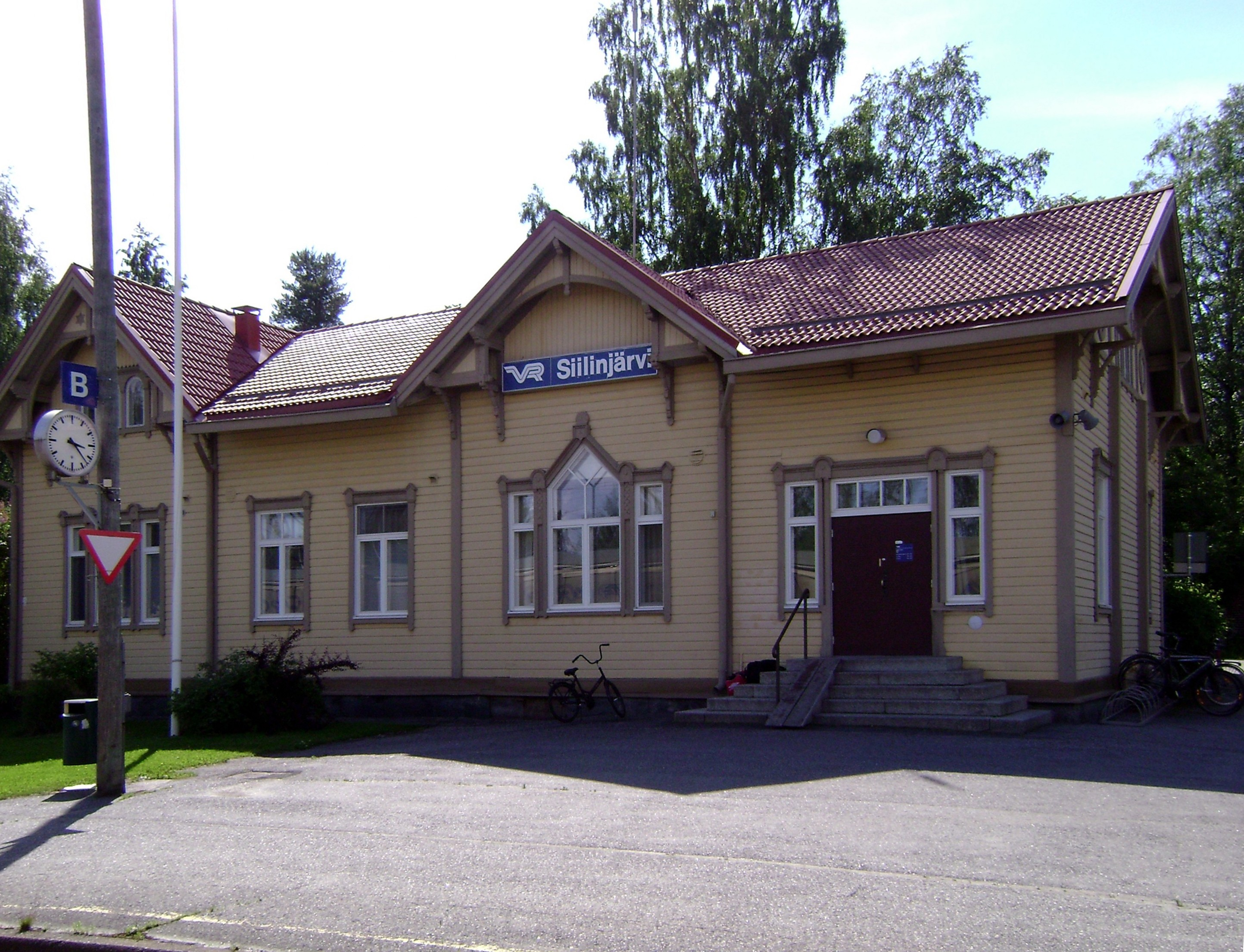

General information
- Location: Asematie 8, 71800 Siilinjärvi
- System: VR station
- Owner: Finnish Transport Agency
- Platforms: 2

Construction
- Structure type: Ground station
- Architect: Bruno Granholm

History
- Opened: 1902
Location

Siilinjärvi railway station (Finnish: Siilinjärven rautatieasema) is located in the municipality of Siilinjärvi in Northern Savonia region of Finland. Opened in 1902, the station is located on the Savonia railway and is also the western terminus of the Siilinjärvi–Viinijärvi-line, the latter of which only serves freight traffic.

== History ==
Siilinjärvi railway station was placed in the village of Kasurila near the Lake Siilinjärvi. The station building designed by architect Bruno Granholm was completed in 1902 and was expanded six years later with the designs of the same architect.

The surroundings of the Siilinjärvi railway station became the centre of the local parish in 1908 and the municipal centre in 1925. The station village also became a place for industry.

A rail connection from the Savonia railway (Kouvola–Iisalmi) to the Karelia railway (Kouvola–Joensuu) was already planned in the late 19th century and Siilinjärvi was one of the candidates to become a junction station. Eventually the rail connection was built from Pieksämäki via Varkaus to Joensuu in the 1930's but despite this another railway line from Siilinjärvi to Sysmäjärvi and Outokumpu was planned as well. This rail connection was intended to be built in the 1940's, but the construction was postponed due to the war. The Siilinjärvi–Viinijärvi railway line was fully completed in 1970.

== Services ==
Siilinjärvi is served by all of the long-distance train services that travel via the Savonia railway from Helsinki to Kajaani and Oulu. The station also serves freight traffic.

== Departure tracks ==
Siilinjärvi railway station has two platform tracks. All passenger trains that stop at the station currently use track 1.
