= Turku Central Station =

Railway station in Turku, Finland

Turku Åbo
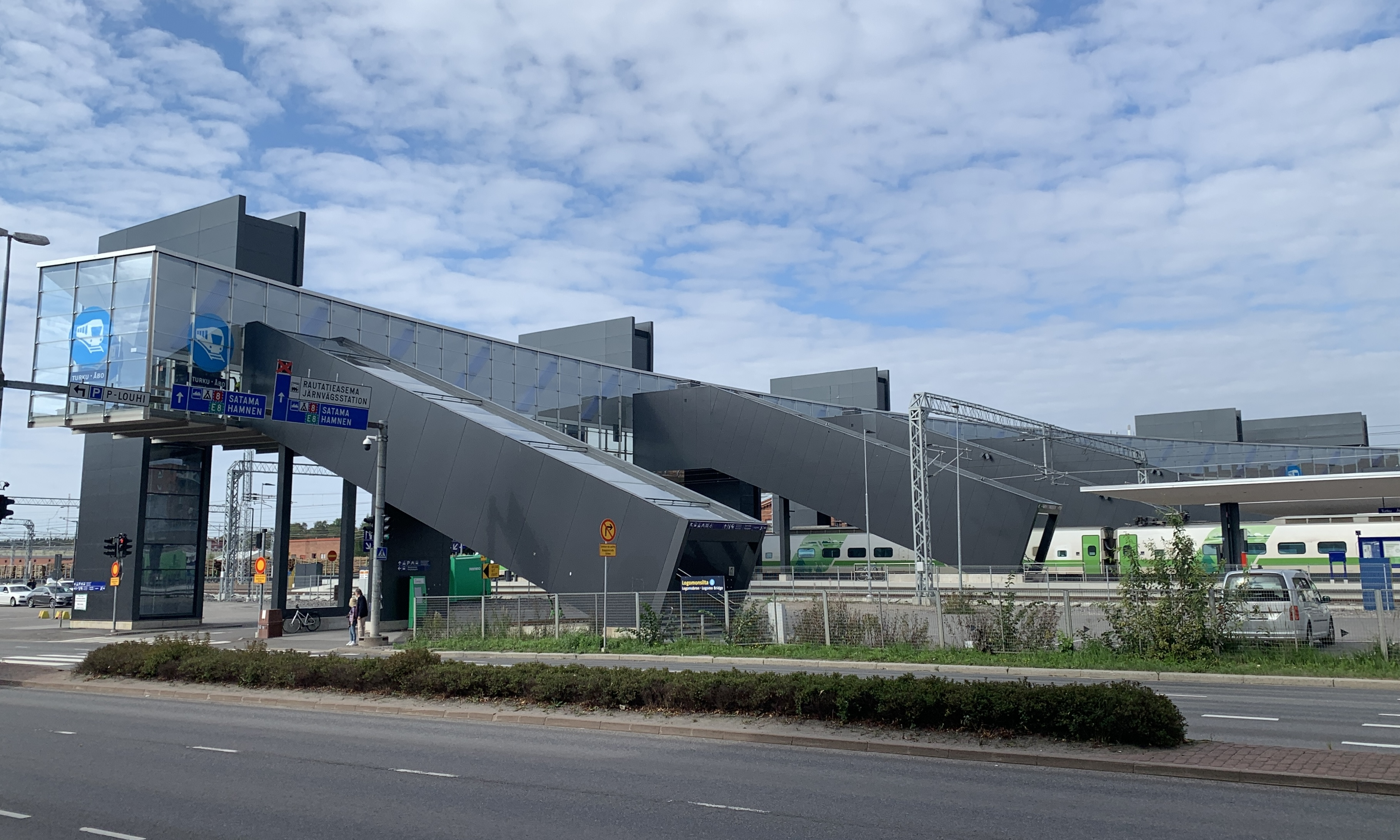

General information
- Location: Ratapihankatu 37, 20100 Turku; Bangårdsgatan 37, 20100 Åbo
- Coordinates: 60°27′14.2″N 022°15′10.7″E
- System: VR station
- Owner: Finnish Transport Agency
- Operator: VR Group
- Lines: Rantarata/Kustbanan; Turku–Toijala; Uudenkaupungin rata/Nystadsbanan
- Platforms: 3
- Tracks: 6

Construction
- Structure type: Ground station

History
- Opened: 1876

Services
Preceding station	VR Group	Following station
Kupittaa towards Helsinki	Helsinki–Turku	Turku Harbour Terminus
Turku Harbour Terminus	Turku–Toijala	Loimaa towards Toijala
Location

Turku Central Station (Finnish: Turun päärautatieasema, Swedish: Åbo centralstation) is a railway station in the VII District of Turku, Finland. It has VR services to Helsinki as well as towards Tampere via Toijala. The station serves approximately a million passengers annually.

The railway station was opened in 1876, together with the newly built railway between Turku and Tampere, in a celebration attended by the future Tsar Alexander III of Russia. Services were at first only to Tampere and Toijala, and the significance of railways was rather minor. In 1899, a new railway to Helsinki was opened, and subsequently rail traffic to and from Turku became more frequent.

The older station was demolished in 1938, and a new, more modern, one was built in its place. The current building, completed in 1940, was designed by Finnish architects Väinö Vähäkallio and Martti Välikangas.

In addition to the two main railway lines to Helsinki and Joensuu, the station has handled passenger traffic to Naantali and Uusikaupunki. These local lines have been discontinued due to lack of use, but are still used by goods traffic. In addition, there is talk of re-establishing the line to Naantali in the near future, either as a museum railway line or a form of local public transport.

Unlike the Helsinki Central railway station, which stands out as a prominent landmark of downtown Helsinki, the Turku Central railway station blends in among the scenery and is hidden behind other buildings when viewed from the city centre. Because of this, it can be difficult for non-Turkuans to get their bearings around the railway station.

On 7 June 2010, the Turku Central railway station was officially renamed Turun päärautatieasema-Åbo centralstation (Turku main railway station, or Turku central railway station) in Finnish and Swedish, replacing the previous official name Turun rautatieasema-Åbo järnvägsstation (Turku railway station). The Finnish transport bureau use "Turku C" as a shorthand, and there were erroneous news reports that this shorthand would also be taken into official use. The Helsinki Central railway station was renamed in a similar manner.

== History ==
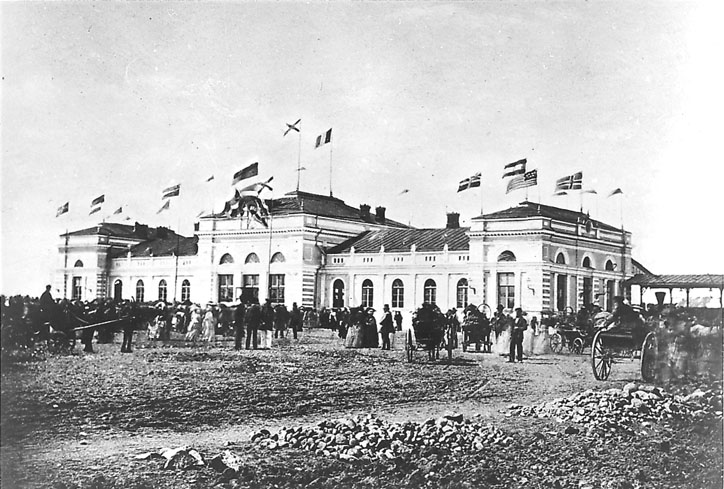
Opening ceremony of Turku railway station in 1876

The construction of the Finnish Main Line in 1862 meant a setback for Turku, which had originally been a place of trade for Tavastians. After the construction of the railway, the Tavastian merchants travelling along the traditional Hämeen Härkätie road started travelling to Helsinki. When the railway from Hämeenlinna to the north was being planned, Turku's significance was further threatened. So it was important for Turku citizens to receive a railway connection from Tampere to Turku as well as to Helsinki, even so that the trip to Turku would be shorter than the one to Helsinki. The railway was constructed in a way that favoured Turku, as the exchange station was built in Toijala, making the trip from Tampere to Turku 19 kilometres shorter than that from Tampere to Helsinki. Construction of the railway started in Turku already in 1874, when the direction of the railway at its northern end was not yet completely clear. There were many Russian immigrant workers working at the railway, and they were paid less than the Finnish workers.

The Turku railway station was opened as the terminus of the Toijala-Turku line in 1876, and it was a class II station similar to the Toijala and Tampere railway station opened at the same time. As well as the station building, an oil warehouse made of brick and a railway roundhouse with four places were built at the site. The roundhouse was later expanded to eight places. A machinery yard was placed next to the railway yard, used to service and repair locomotives and passenger carriages. The track was extended from Turku Central Station to the Turku Harbour in 1876, when the terminus of the track was located between the Turku Castle and the river Aura.

The Turku Central Station became a crossing station as the railway from Turku to Karis was completed in 1899. After the entire Rantarata track had been completed in 1903, the shortest trip from Turku to Helsinki went via Karis, but the trip via Toijala was still the fastest, as the Rantarata track was originally meant for commuter traffic. The decision to build the Uusikaupunki track was made already in 1909, but uncertain times hindered its construction and so traffic to Naantali was only possible in 1923 and to Uusikaupunki in 1924. A side track to the Pansio oil harbour was built from the start of the Uusikaupunki track in the early 1930s.

Already at the start of the railway construction, the Turku railway yard became a border to the traffic northwards from the city. The Raunistula suburban area had formed to the north of the railway in the municipality of Maaria, with highway connections to Pori and Tampere. Already in the early 20th century there were plans to replace the highway level crossings with a bridge, but because of the soft soil the bridge, which required difficult planning and construction work, was only built in the eastern end of the railway yard in 1931.

After World War II, there were plans to extend the railway southwards from Turku to the Pargas limestone mines, but nothing ever became of them.

The historic centre of the city of Turku was located on the southern side of the Aura River around the Turku Cathedral. After the Great Fire of Turku in 1827 the city was expanded, and as ships grew in size the harbour piers were moved to the current Linnansatama area. Building the railway station on the northern edge of the city was a solution suitable for the Toijala track, although the station was located far away from the old city centre. As time passed, the commercial centre of Turku shifted to the northern side of the river. As tram traffic in Turku started in 1908, the circular line connected the Turku Cathedral, the Market Square and the railway station with each other, and this connection remained all the way until trams in Turku were discontinued in 1972.

For a long time, Turku was an important traffic hub for commuter traffic, as trains went from the Turku Central Station towards Paimio, Loimaa, Naantali and Uusikaupunki. Commuter train traffic to Naantali was discontinued in 1972 and to Paimio in 1979; ship train connections to Naantali remained in operation from 1970 to 1984 and from 1989 to 1990. The Dm9 trains used in Turku commuter traffic, nicknamed "Carrots", were discontinued in the early 1990s. Commuter train traffic to Loimaa continued with locomotive-driven trains until 1990 and to Uusikaupunki until the end of the year 1992.

=== Ticket sales ===
Ticket sales at the Turku Central Station were stopped in 2020. Since then, the station has only had an automatic ticket sales machine.

== Traffic ==
The Turku Central Station has passenger train connections along the Rantarata line to east towards Helsinki as well as to the north via Toijala towards Tampere. Trains from Tampere and Helsinki also carry passengers to the Port of Turku at ship departure times. All trains to Helsinki are InterCity or Pendolino trains. The trains to Tampere are InterCity trains and travel less frequently than the trains to Helsinki.

The Turku Central Station also has a railway connection to Uusikaupunki, but this railway has not served passenger traffic since 1992, although there are plans to return this service, with investigations made from 2005 to 2007. According to a February 2008 report this will not be accomplished in the near future, because it is difficult to make it pay off its cost. Development of the Rantarata line is seen as more important.

== Platforms ==
The station platforms (numbered 2–7) used to be located by the station building. They were dismantled in 2022–2024 during the reparations of the Turku railyard. In 2024, new platforms were built at the Logomo cultural centre with numbers 1–6. At the moment, all of the platform tracks are in use by the trains serving the station without any particular arrangement.

== Station building ==
=== Old station building ===
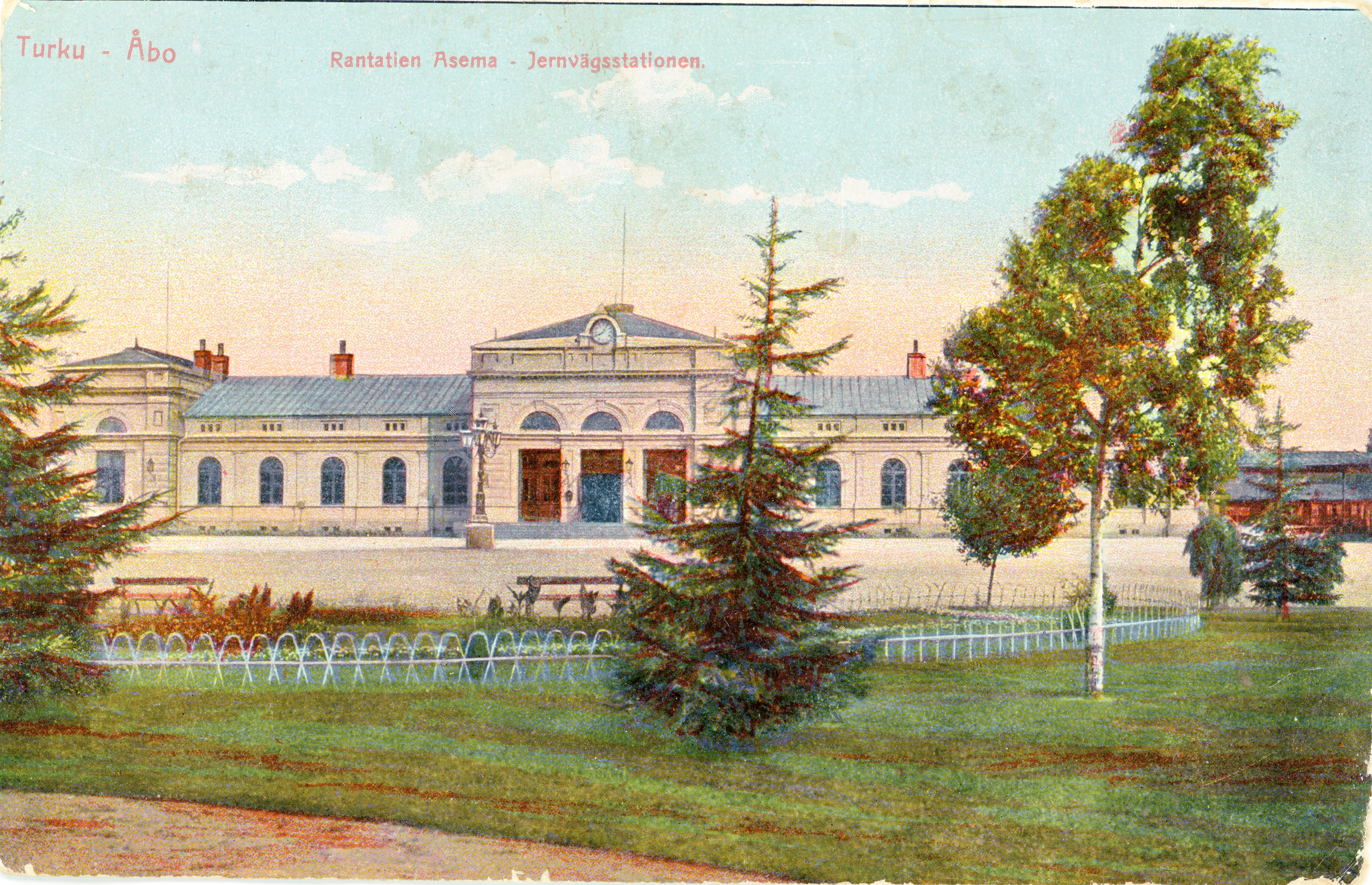
An old postcard of the old railway station in Turku.

The old station building in Turku, located at the site of the current station building, was inaugurated in 1876. Trains departed from the station at first to Toijala and the Port of Turku, and later to Karis and Helsinki. The two-floor station building was designed by architect Pehr Erik Degenaer. The bottom floor hosted waiting halls for three different classes, the ladies' room, ticket sales and baggage handling, the station office, the office of the station master, the telegraph office, the mail office, storage for baggage and a room for travelling officials. The top floor hosted apartments. The old station building was dismantled to make way for the new one in 1938.

=== Current station building ===
The current station building was designed by architects Martti Välikangas and Väinö Vähäkallio, and it was completed in 1940. The building was constructed exceptionally by the Finnish Building Administration instead of the Finnish Railway Administration.

The bottom floor of the station hosted ticket sales, a waiting hall, baggage storage, a café and a mail office. The mail office moved away from the station in 1987. The top floor originally hosted the station restaurant. One side of the floor had a restaurant for the first class, while the other had a restaurant for the common class. The restaurant remained in the premises until 2004.

The original facade of the building was made of yellow tiles. The facade was changed from 1978 to 1979, giving the building a yellow brick facade.

=== Current state ===
The Turku Central Station was renovated from 2005 to 2006. The largest change was to the ticket office, which was moved to the wing of the building.

The Finnish Heritage Agency has designated the Turku Railway Station and its environment as one of the culturally significant environments in Finland. The Logomo cultural centre was opened at the old VR Group machinery building next to the railway station in January 2011.

The distance from the Turku Central Station to the Turku bus station is about 700 metres. There have been plans to combine the stations into a transport hub, and an investigation report was published in 2006. So far the project has remained at the planning stage.

== Turku transport location ==
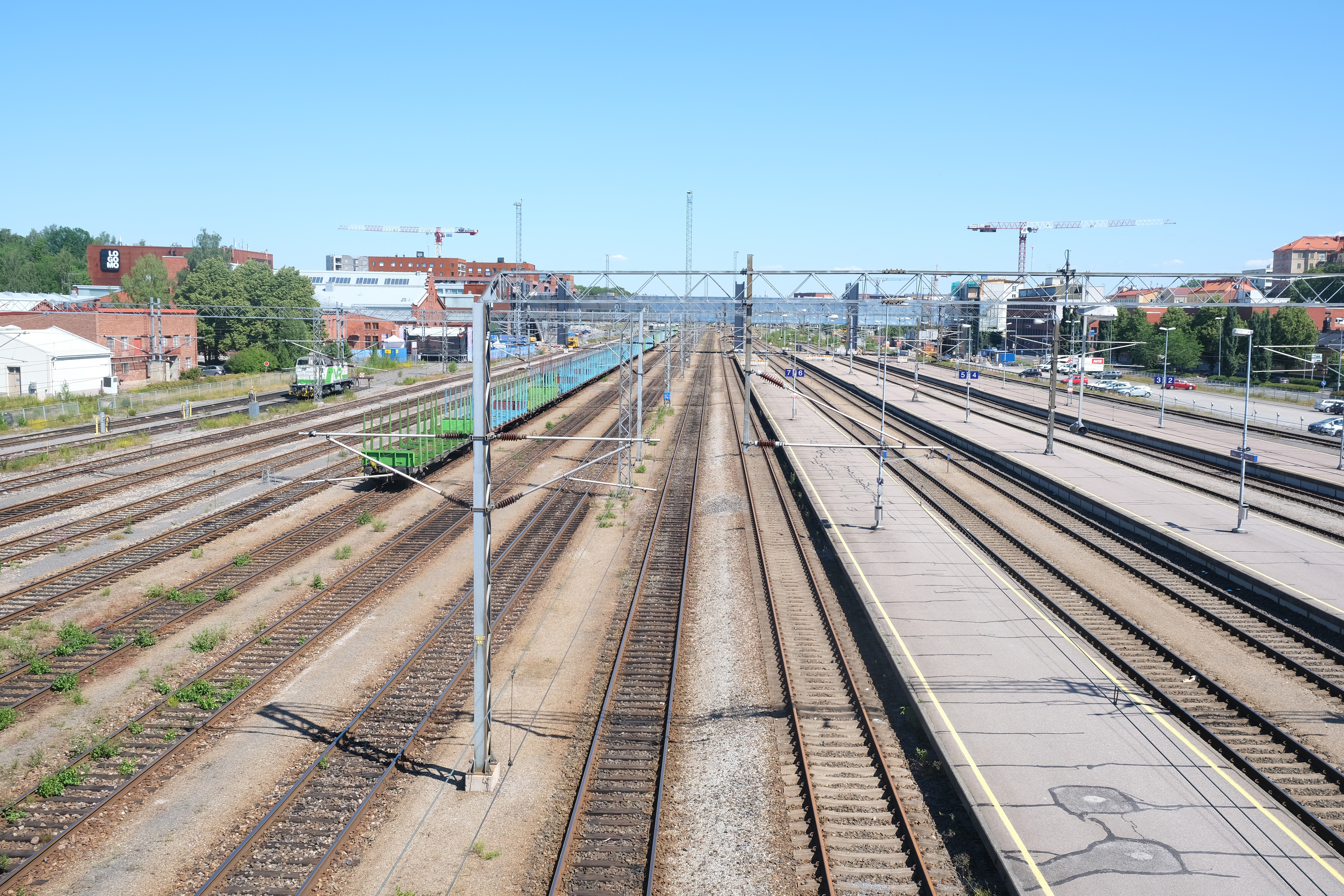
A view of the Turku railway yard.

The Turku transport location (abbreviated Tur) has been in use since 5 June 2005, consisting of the following parts:

- Kupittaa railway station (Kut, passenger transport)
- Turku Central Station (Tku, passenger transport)
- Turku cargo station (Tkut, cargo transport)
- Port of Turku station (Tus, passenger transport)
- Turku Viheriäinen (Vie, cargo transport)

== Gallery ==
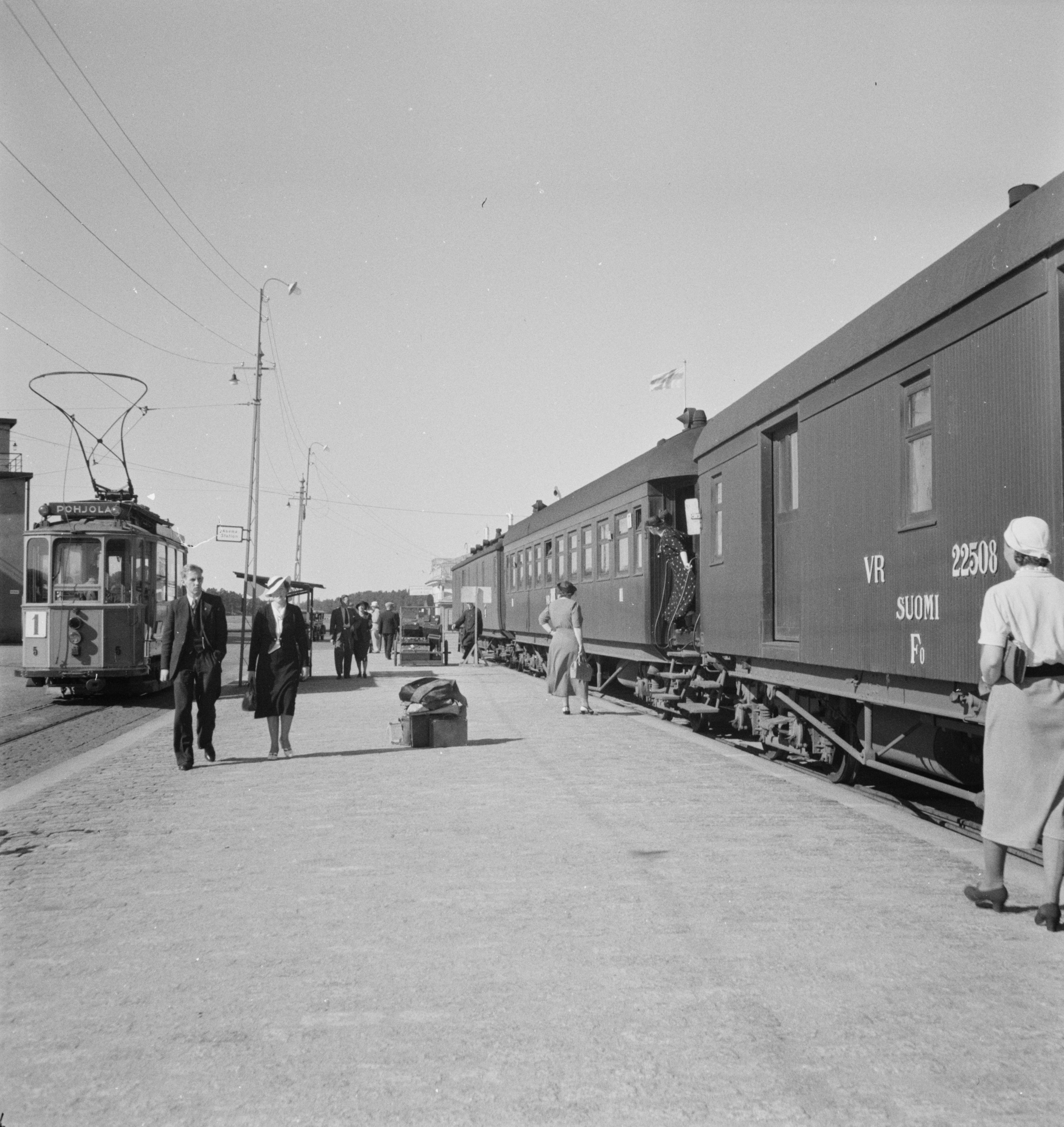
Turku station, 1941

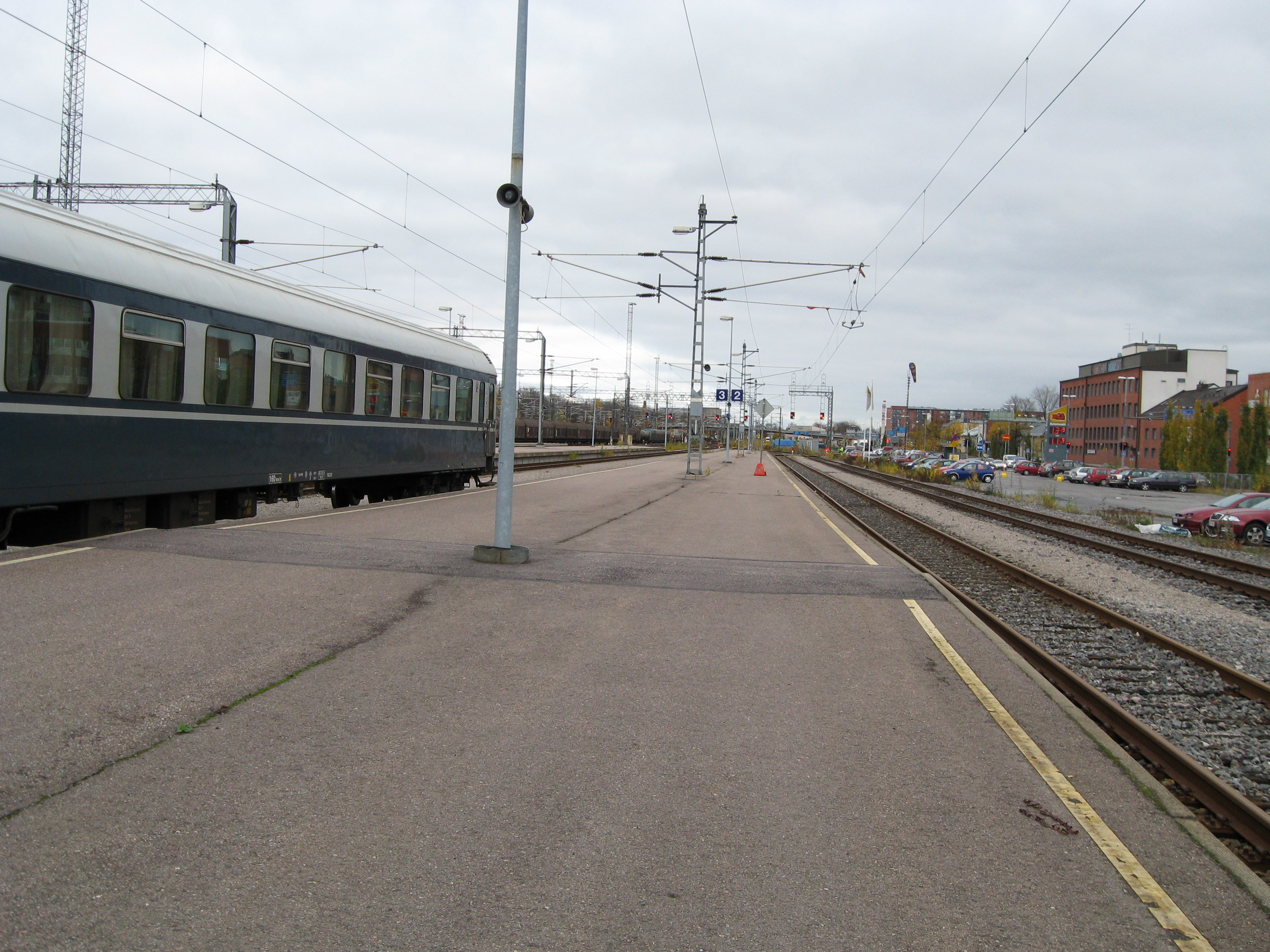
Turku Central railway station

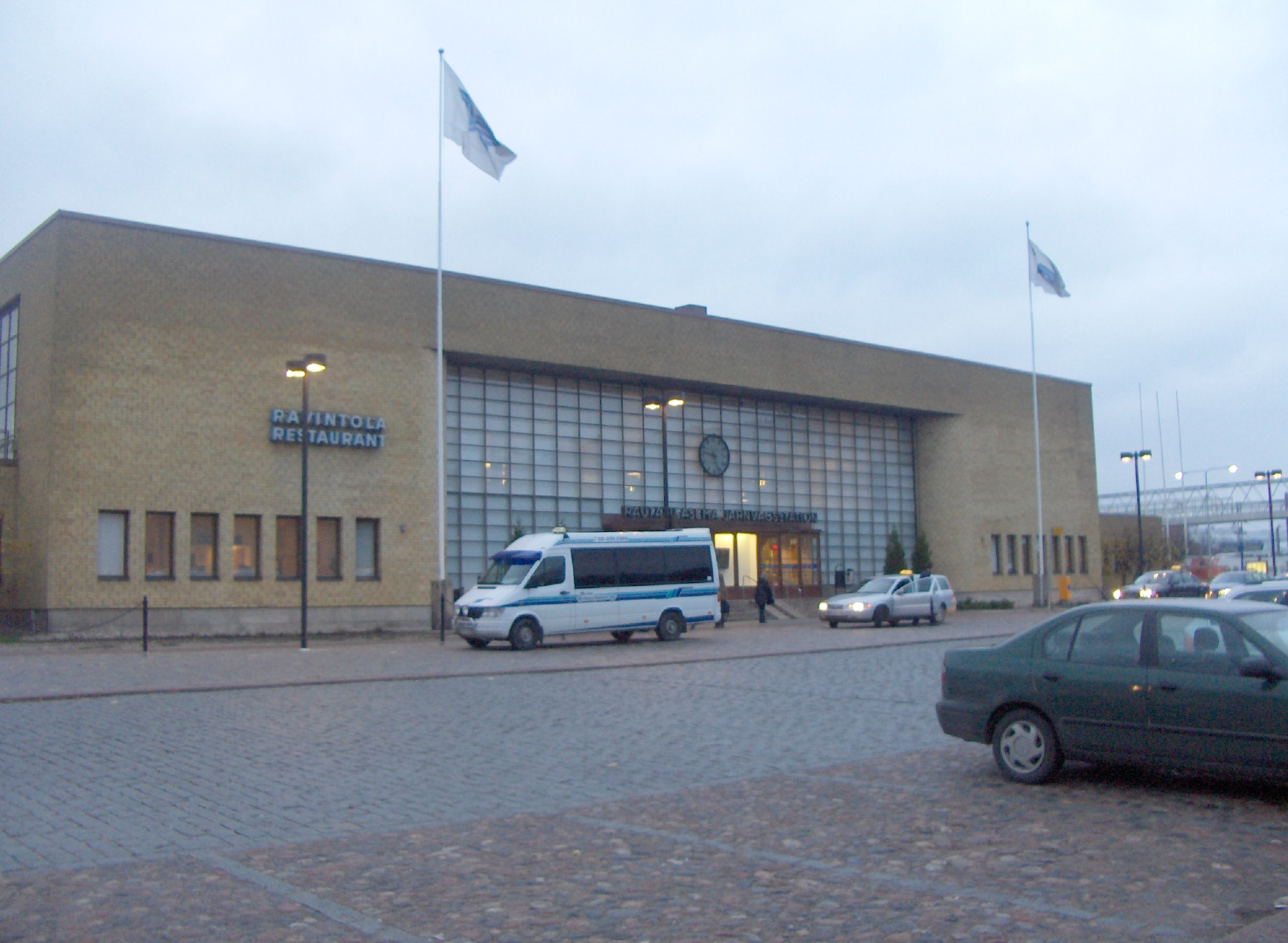
Turku Central railway station with parking places

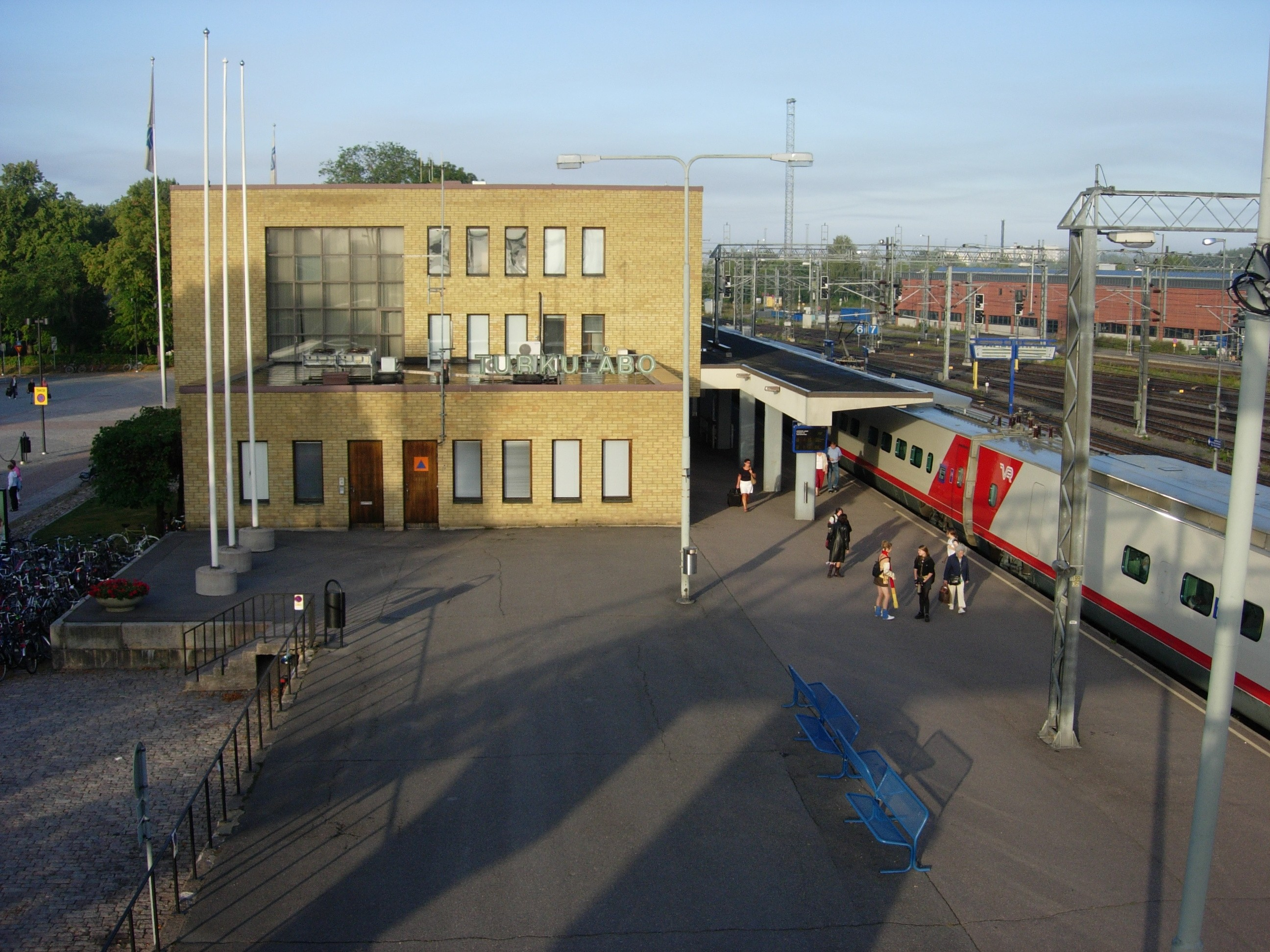
The station viewed from the east

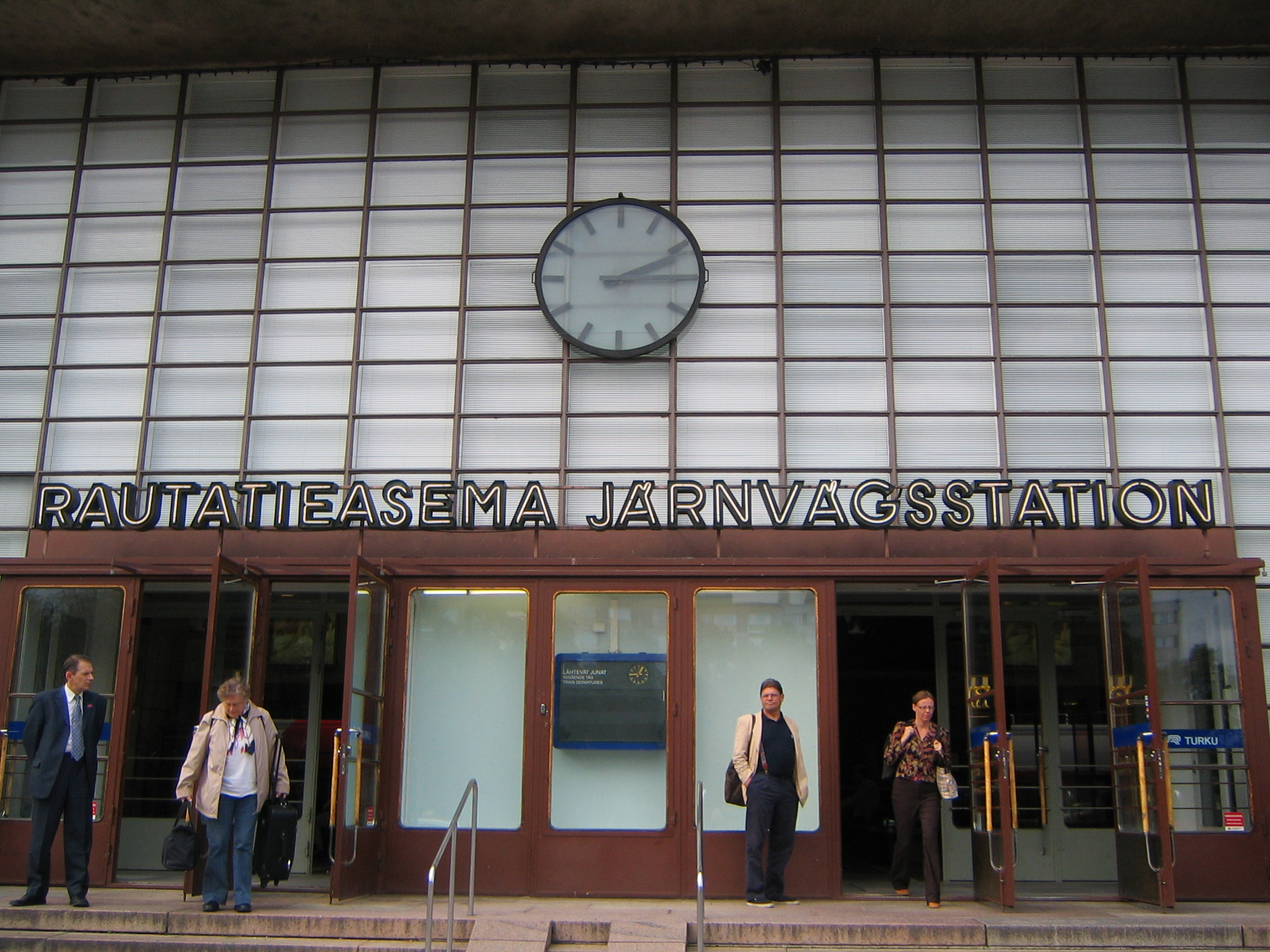
The entrance to the station

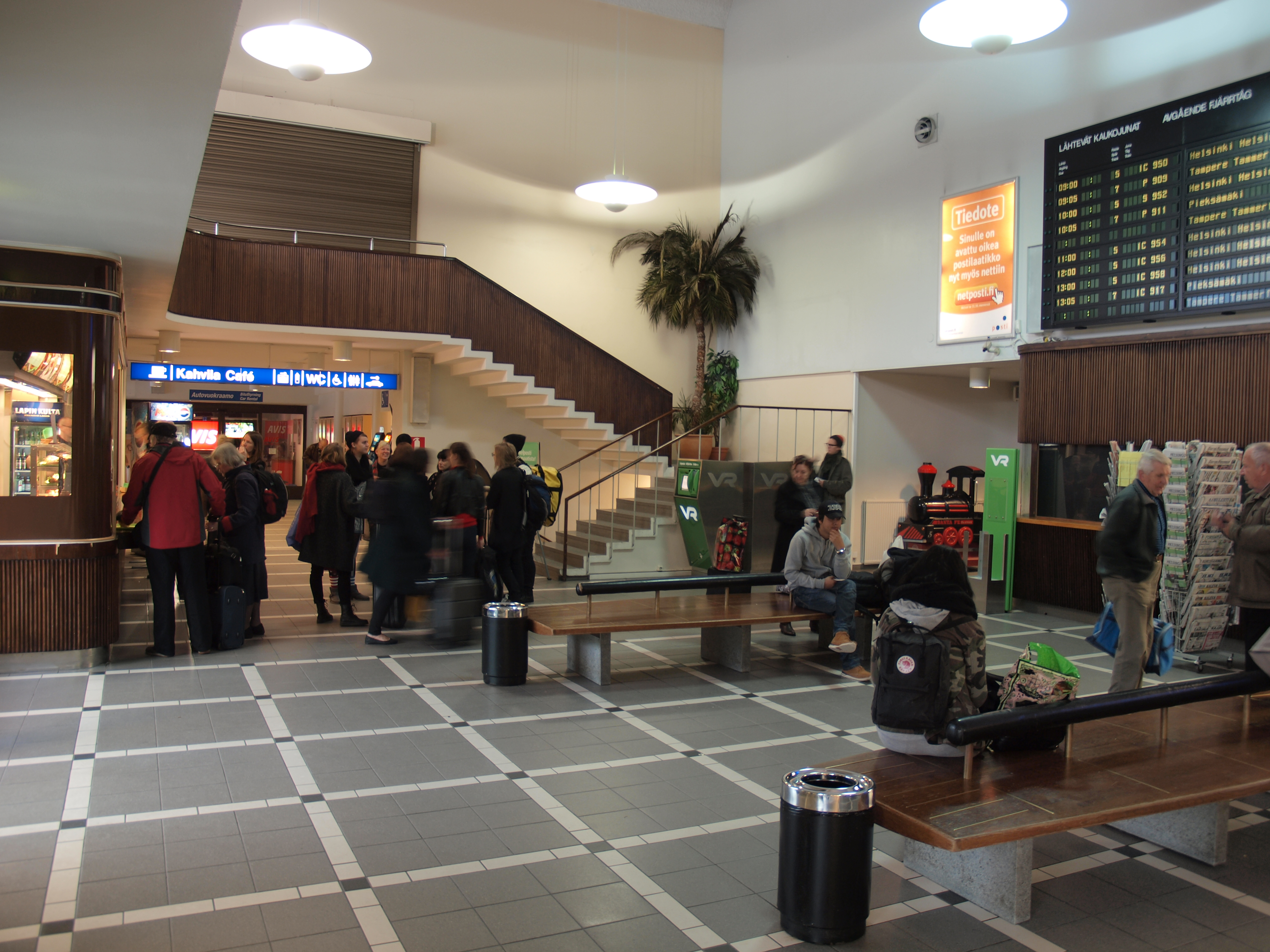
Interior of the station building
