= Port of Turku =

Port in the southwest of Finland

Coordinates: 60.435278°N 22.219784°E

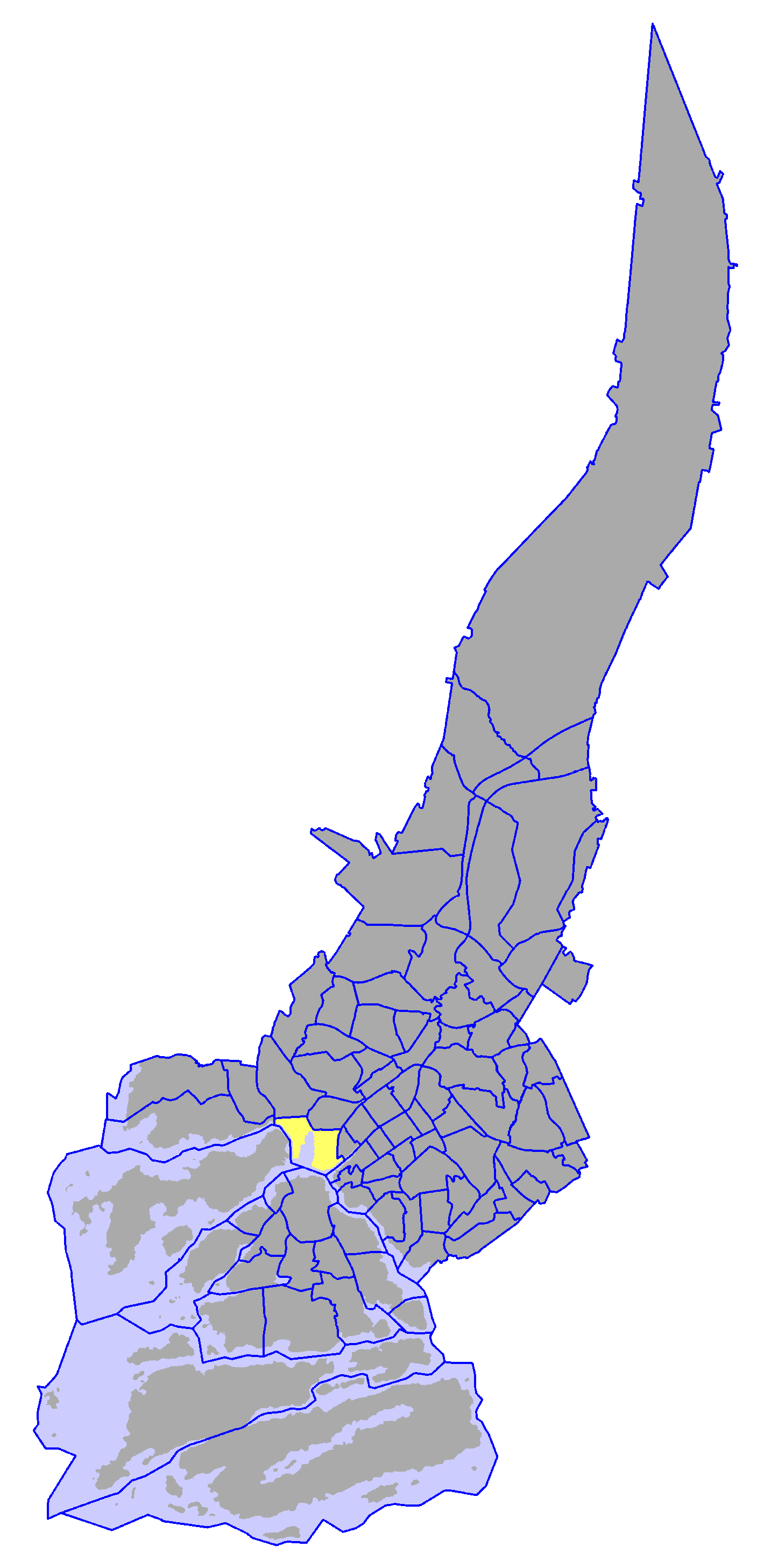
The Port of Turku on a map of Turku.

The Port of Turku (Finnish: Turun satama, Swedish: Åbo hamn) is a port located in the south-west of Finland, where the mainland meets the beginning of the Turku archipelago. Sited within Finland's sixth largest city, the port principally handles traffic between Turku and the Swedish capital of Stockholm and the enclaved Åland.

== Harbour ==
The port spans a wide area on the southern coastline of the city of Turku, from the mouth of the River Aura to the district of Pansio. The area around the railway station is served by the four (twice-daily) Silja line and Viking Line passenger ferry services to Stockholm via Mariehamn, the capital of Åland.

== Ships serving the terminal ==
Company	Ship	Route
(Finland) Silja Line	MS Baltic Princess	Turku – Mariehamn/Långnäs – Stockholm
(Finland) Viking Line	MS Viking Grace	Turku – Mariehamn/Långnäs – Stockholm
(Finland) Viking Line	MS Viking Glory	Turku – Mariehamn/Långnäs – Stockholm

=== Importance ===
Because of the port's location at the southwestern corner of Finland the harbour provides the most efficient route to serve the Baltic Sea. Turku Harbour is one of the most important shipment points in the country, handling over four million tonnes of cargo and a corresponding four million passengers per year.

As a comparison to Helsinki-Vantaa Airport; Turku handles one third as many passengers per year, but thirty times as much freight annually.

Daily passenger ferry traffic is operated from Turku to Åland and Stockholm. Weekly ferry destinations include Travemünde, Hamburg, Lübeck, Antwerp, Harwich and Paldiski. There are also less frequent connections to popular holiday destinations such as St Malo and several cities in Spain. The most important operators of ferry services are Silja Line and Viking Line.

== District ==
Port of Turku (Finnish Turun satama; Swedish Åbo hamn) is also the name of a district of Turku, with boundaries roughly corresponding with those of the port's area. As of 2004, the district had a registered residential population of forty-four people.

The port is mentioned in the Arab geographer Muhammad al-Idrisi's 1154 book Kitab Rudjdjar, reflecting Turku's status as a capital city and major Baltic Sea trading post.

== Railway ==
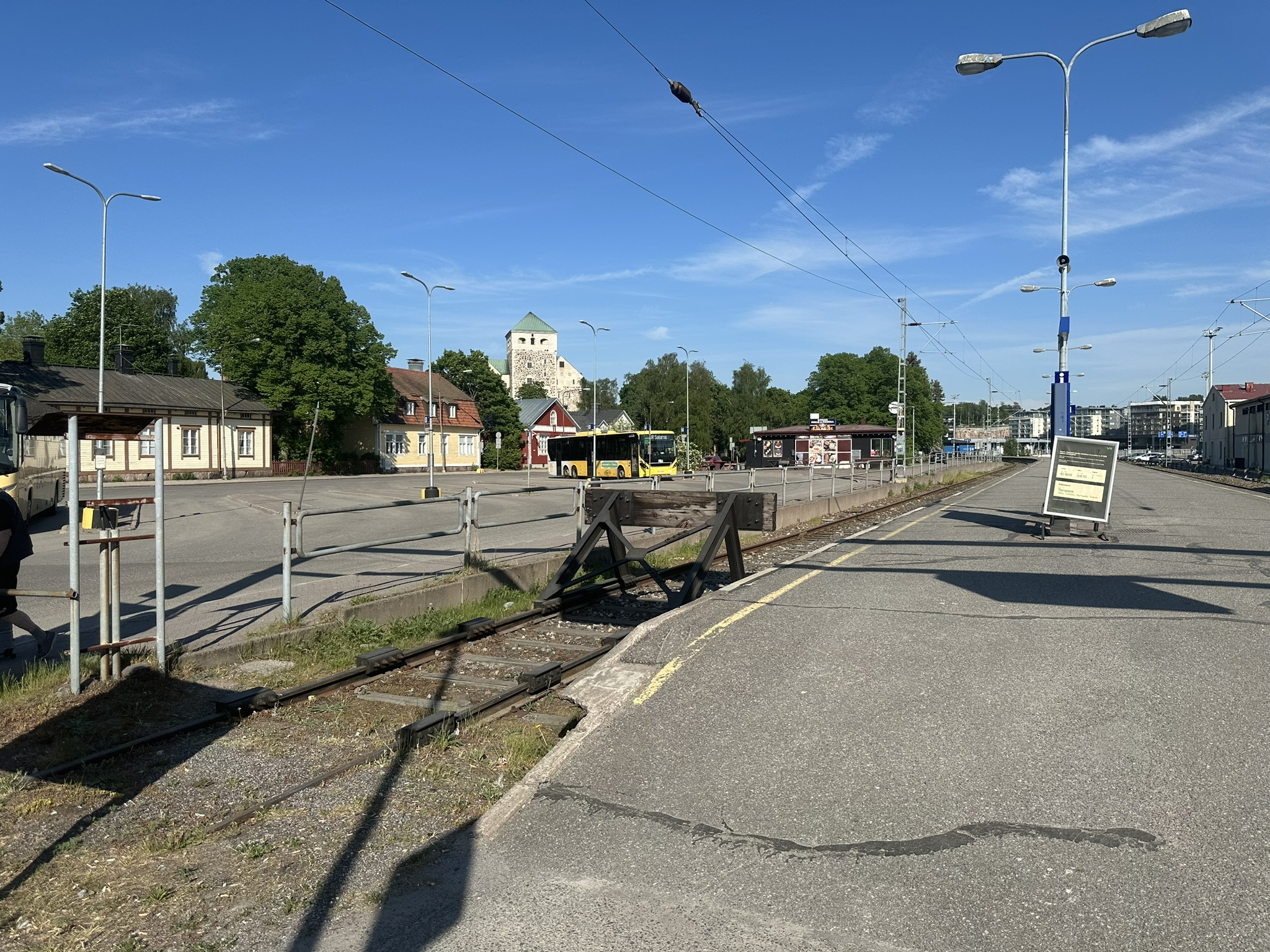
Turku Harbour railway and coach stations

Turku Harbour railway station is located adjacent to the main passenger-ferry berths used by the ferries to Stockholm in Sweden and has two full-length tracks arranged with a central platform between them. Passengers walk directly off the platform and onto the car-park and bus-station area in front of the ferry terminals.

Most traffic to the station is by people wishing to board a ship at the port and the services are timed to overlap with the ferries berthing times. The station has direct boat-train services to Helsinki and towards Pieksämäki (terminating or starting in Tampere). All services to and from Turku Harbour call at Turku Central railway station. The three kilometre journey between the two stations takes around seven minutes, involving the slow-speed crossing of several main roads with level crossings, passing the city's residential and industrial areas.

The phrase Turku Harbour is the semi-official English name of the railway station, being used in English-language timetables and "next stop" announcements on board VR trains.

Note that although the station has direct through sleeping car services to Rovaniemi and Kolari in the north of Finland, passengers using the car-carrying trains are required to drive into the centre of the town to load their vehicles at Turku Central railway station where appropriate ramps are installed.

=== Cargo ===
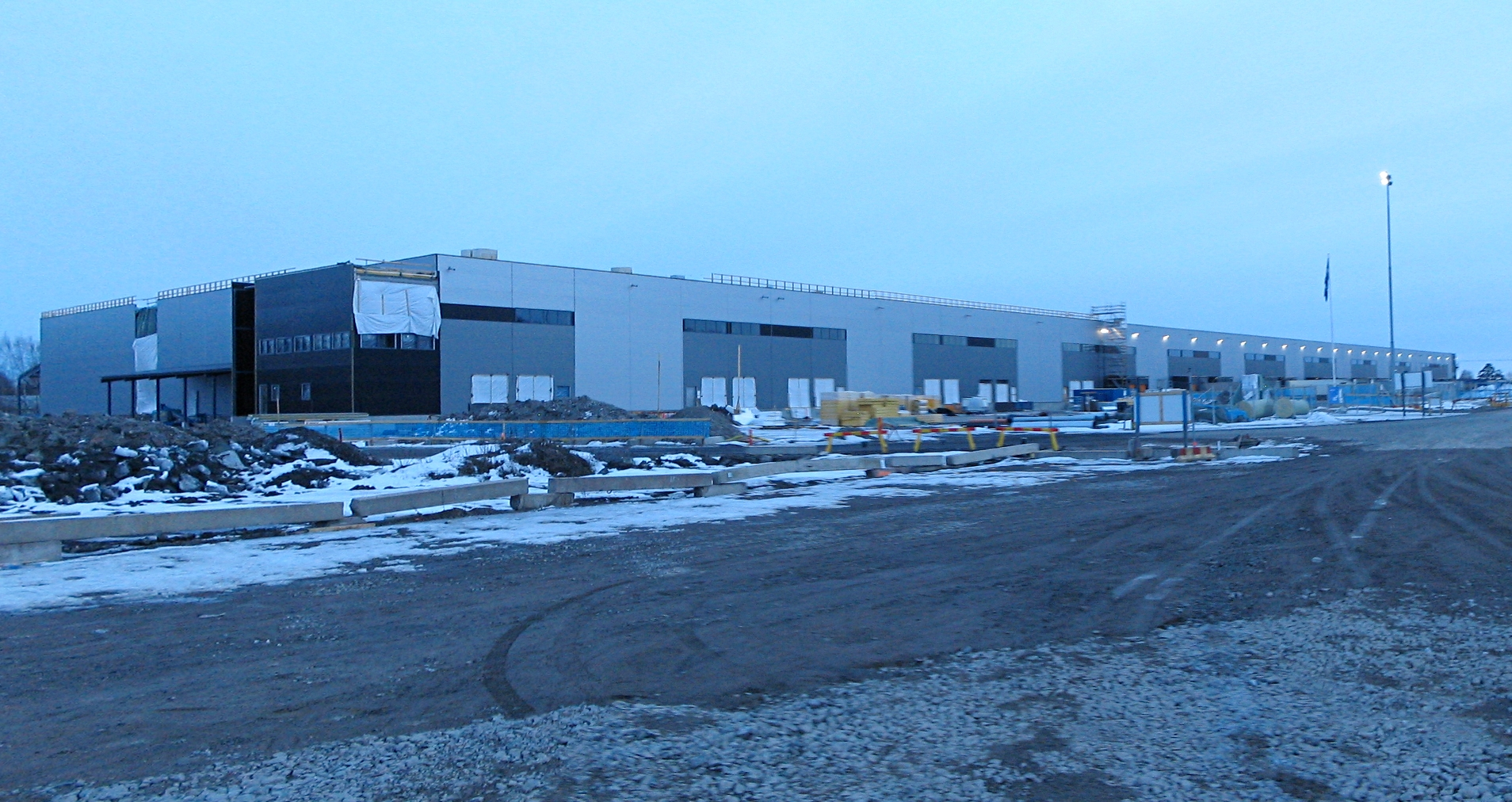
Logistics terminal in vicinity of the seaport. Under enlargement construction.

Turku was the only port in Finland with a train ferry service. Between June 1989 and December 2011 SeaWind Line provided a limited train ferry operation for cargo. Because of the gauge difference between Finland (1,524 mm) and the rest of Europe (1,435 mm), through service was using special variable gauge rolling stock. The tracks in Stockholm and on the ferry itself were standard gauge, with a short section of standard gauge in the harbour area to enable hauling the wagons off the ferry before the gauge of the axles was altered using bogie exchange.

== See also ==
- Ports of the Baltic Sea
