= Lappeenranta Airport =

International airport in Finland

Lappeenranta Airport Lappeenrannan lentoasema
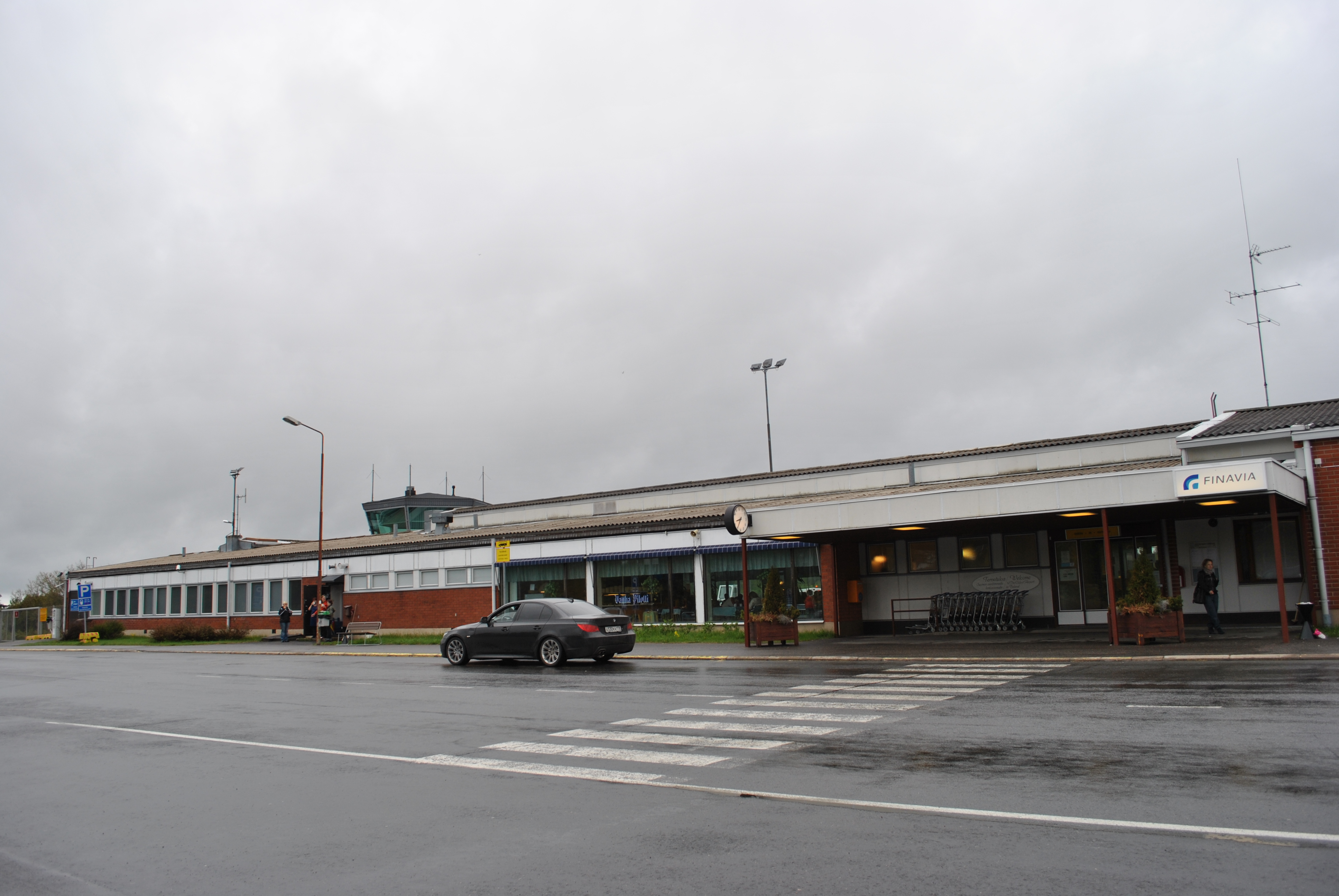
- IATA: LPP; ICAO: EFLP

Summary
- Airport type: Public
- Operator: Lappeenrannan Lentoasema Oy
- Serves: Lappeenranta, Finland
- Elevation AMSL: 106 m (348 ft)
- Coordinates: 61°02′45″N 028°08′55″E
- Website: lppairport.fi

Map
- Location within Finland

Runways
Direction	Length		Surface
Direction	m	ft	Surface
06/24	2,500	8,202	Asphalt

Statistics (2013)
- Passengers: 98,300
- Source: AIP Finland

Lappeenranta Airport (IATA: LPP, ICAO: EFLP) (Finnish: Lappeenrannan lentoasema) is an international airport in Lappeenranta, Finland. It is 2.5 kilometers southwest of the city center and Lappeenranta Central Station. Opened in 1918, Lappeenranta Airport is the oldest airport still in operation in Finland. The Karelia Aviation Museum is in the airport. Flight goes on low altitude straight over Lappeenranta midtown which is located 1½ kilometer (1 mile) from the eastern end of the runway.

== History ==
The airport opened in 1918. Between 1939 and 1944, during World War II, the airport operated as a military air base.

In 1951, passenger traffic began at the airport. In 1960, the existing terminal was completed. In 1998, the runway was extended to 2,500 metres. In September 2006, the railway between Lahti and Kerava opened, shortening the travel time by rail to Helsinki and caused the closure of the Lappeenranta-Helsinki air route.

In March 2010, Ryanair started flights to Lappeenranta, its second destination in Finland after Tampere Airport. The passenger record was in 2010 with 115,000 passengers, partially attributed to the patronage of a large number of Russian tourists from the large neighbouring city of Saint Petersburg. The airport was in 2014 on 73nd position in the list of the busiest airports in the Nordic countries. This boom would not last long, with the flow of Russian tourists falling sharply in 2014 in the wake of the Euromaidan in Ukraine.

The only airline flying to Lappeenranta, Ryanair, ceased all flights there on 21 October 2015.

In 2016, ownership of the airport changed from the state-owned Finavia to a company owned by the City of Lappeenranta, Lappeenrannan Lentoasema Oy. The airport had no scheduled flights 2016–2017, but Ryanair restarted again in March 2018.

Due to mounting financial losses, and the lack of flight demand, the City of Lappeenranta is debating whether to continue operating the airport. Attempts to secure funding were halted due to EU regulations after consultation with the European Commission and the Ministry of Economic Affairs and Employment. Since its purchase of the airport, the city has spent over twelve million euro in keeping the airport open.

The airport's financial problems reflect a larger economic downturn in the eastern border regions of Finland, following the COVID-19 pandemic and the breakdown of Finland-Russia relations. In addition, aviation has encountered disruption as a result of Russian GNSS jamming along the Finnish border due to the threat of UAV attacks, with Finland reinstating legacy radio navigation systems. In 2025, Yle reported that the airports yearly revenue had been lower than expected due to a decrease in general aviation and training flights, necessitating the need to contract airport workers for other town services.

== Airlines and destinations ==
There are currently no scheduled flights to the airport.

There are a few seasonal air charters to European holiday destinations.

== Statistics ==
Annual passenger statistics for Lappeenranta Airport
Year	Domestic passengers	International passengers	Total passengers	Change
2005	46,536	3,112	49,648	+1.7% ▲
2006	40,779	8,724	49,503	−0.3% ▼
2007	18,948	4,036	22,984	−53.6% ▼
2008	19,056	4,283	23,339	+1.5% ▲
2009	8,265	5,798	14,063	−39.7% ▼
2010	4,190	56,910	61,100	+324.7% ▲
2011	310	115,957	116,267	+90.3% ▲
2012	112	93,650	93,762	−19.4% ▼
2013	147	98,153	98,300	+4.8% ▲
2014	325	89,226	89,551	−8.8% ▼
2015	586	35,206	35,792	–60.0% ▼
2016	0	0	0	–100.0% ▼
2019	175	80,985	81,160	
2020	27	21,730	21,757	–73.2% ▼
2021	8	13,712	13,720	–36.9% ▼
2022	28	35,768	35,796	160.9% ▲
2023	58	33,297	33,355	–6.8% ▼
2024	157	26,883	27,040	–18.9% ▼
2025	190	21,177	21,367	–21.0% ▼

== Ground transportation ==
Local bus number 4, which departs in front of the airport terminal, operates service to/from the city center and Lappeenranta railway station. Taxi service is also available. From the railway station, further connections to Helsinki are offered by VR, Savonlinja, and OnniBus.com. The distance from midtown by road to the terminal is 2½ kilometer (1½ mile).

Means of transport at Lappeenranta Airport
Means of transport	Operator	Route	Destinations	Website	Notes
Bus	Lappeenranta Public Transport	4	Lappeenranta railway station		every 60 min
