= Joutseno railway station =

Railway station in Lappeenranta, Finland

Joutseno
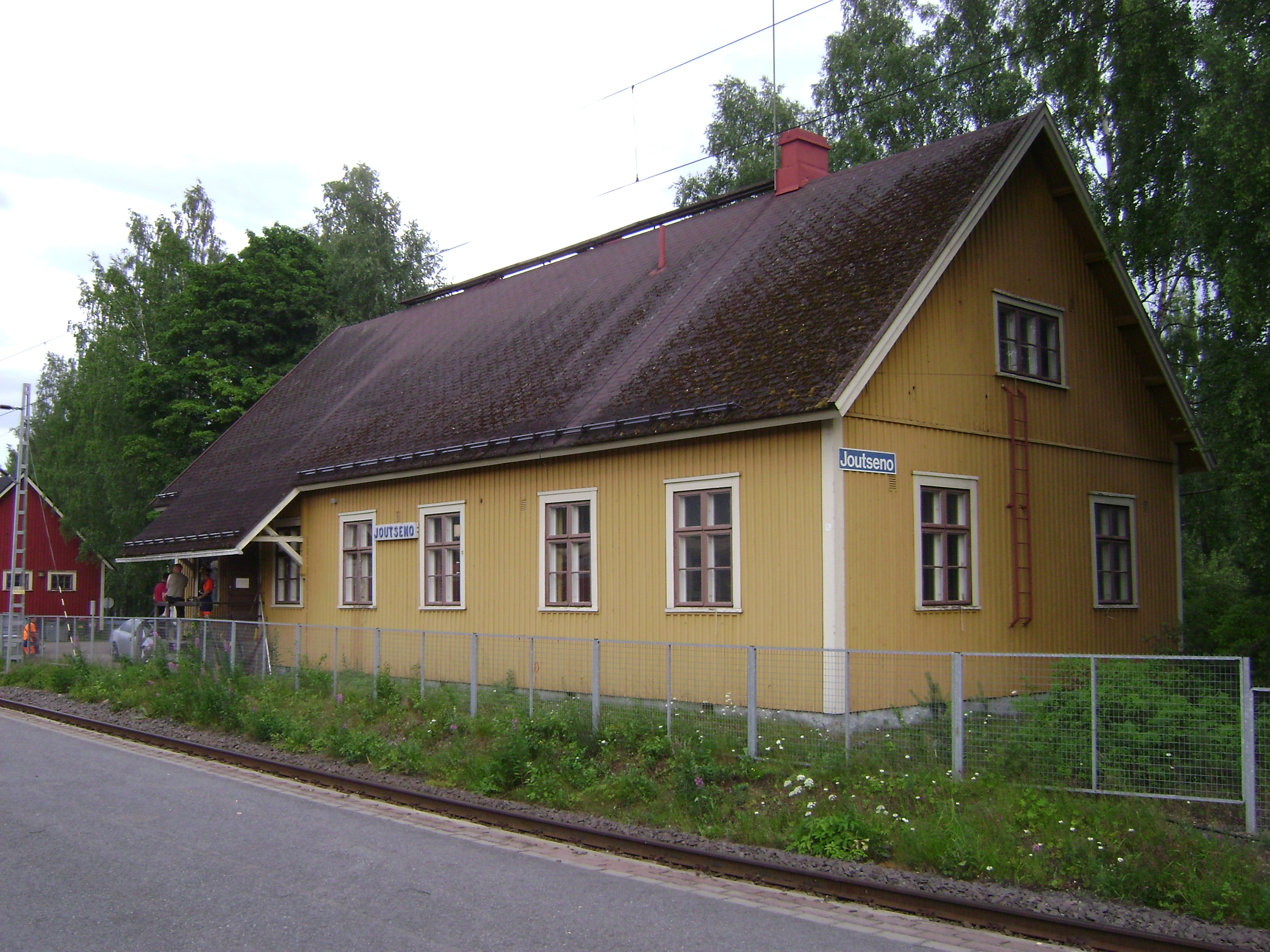

General information
- Location: Asemansuora 14, 54100; Joutseno, Lappeenranta; Finland
- Coordinates: 61°07′13″N 028°29′21″E
- System: VR station
- Owner: Finnish Transport Infrastructure Agency
- Operator: VR Group
- Line: Kouvola–Joensuu
- Platforms: 1 island platform
- Tracks: 2 (with platforms)

Construction
- Architect: Thure Hellström

Other information
- Station code: Jts
- Classification: Operating point

History
- Opened: 1 October 1934

Passengers
- 2008: 27,000

Services
Preceding station	VR Group	Following station
Lappeenranta towards Kouvola	Kouvola–Joensuu	Imatra towards Joensuu
Location
- Location within South Karelia Location within Finland

The Joutseno railway station (Finnish: Joutsenon rautatieasema, Swedish: Joutseno järnvägsstation) is located in the town of Lappeenranta, Finland, in the district of Joutseno. It is located along the Kouvola–Joensuu railway, and its neighboring stations are Lappeenranta in the west and Imatra in the east.

== Services and departure tracks ==
Joutseno is served by most long-distance trains (InterCity and Pendolino) that use the Kouvola–Joensuu line as part of their route. Joutseno has two platform tracks and all trains that stop at the station currently use track 1.
