= Simpele railway station =

Railway station in Rautjärvi, Finland

Simpele
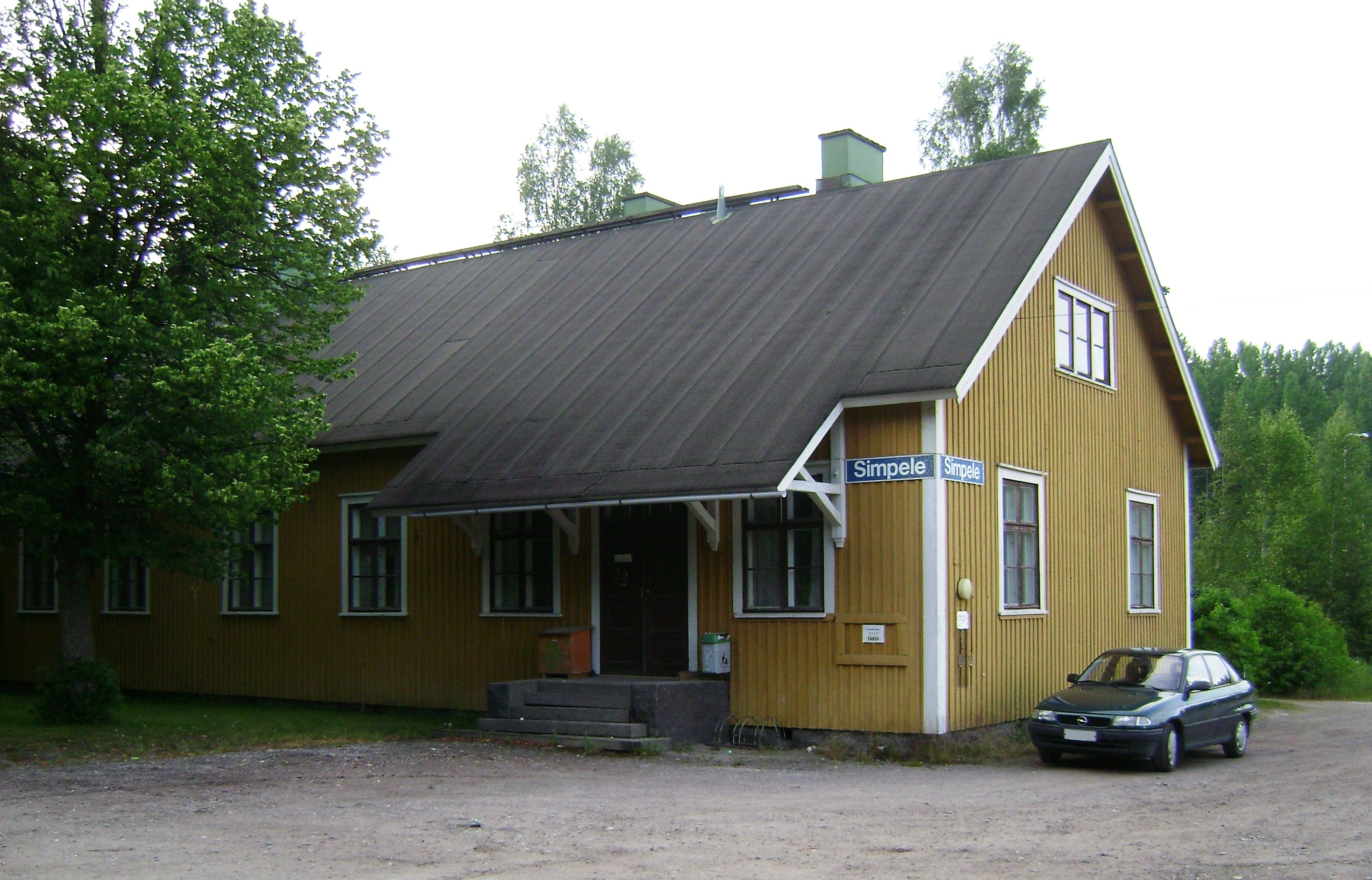

General information
- Location: Karjalantie 3170, 56800; Simpele, Rautjärvi; Finland
- Coordinates: 61°25′30″N 029°22′19″E
- System: VR station
- Owner: Finnish Transport Infrastructure Agency
- Operator: VR Group
- Line: Kouvola–Joensuu
- Platforms: 1 side platform 1 island platform
- Tracks: 3 (with platforms)

Construction
- Architect: Thure Hellström

Other information
- Station code: Spl
- Classification: Operating point

History
- Opened: 1 November 1937

Passengers
- 2008: 13,000

Services
Preceding station	VR Group	Following station
Imatra towards Kouvola	Kouvola–Joensuu	Parikkala towards Joensuu
Location
- Location within South Karelia Location within Finland

The Simpele railway station (Finnish: Simpeleen rautatieasema, Swedish: Simpele järnvägsstation) is located in the municipality of Rautjärvi, Finland, in the urban area and municipal seat of Simpele. It is located along the Kouvola–Joensuu railway, and its neighboring stations are Imatra in the west and Parikkala in the east.

== Services and departure tracks ==
Simpele is served by long-distance trains (InterCity and Pendolino) that use the Kouvola–Joensuu line as part of their route. The station has three platform tracks and all trains that stop at the station currently use track 2.
