= Imatra railway station =

Railway station in Imatra, Finland

Imatra
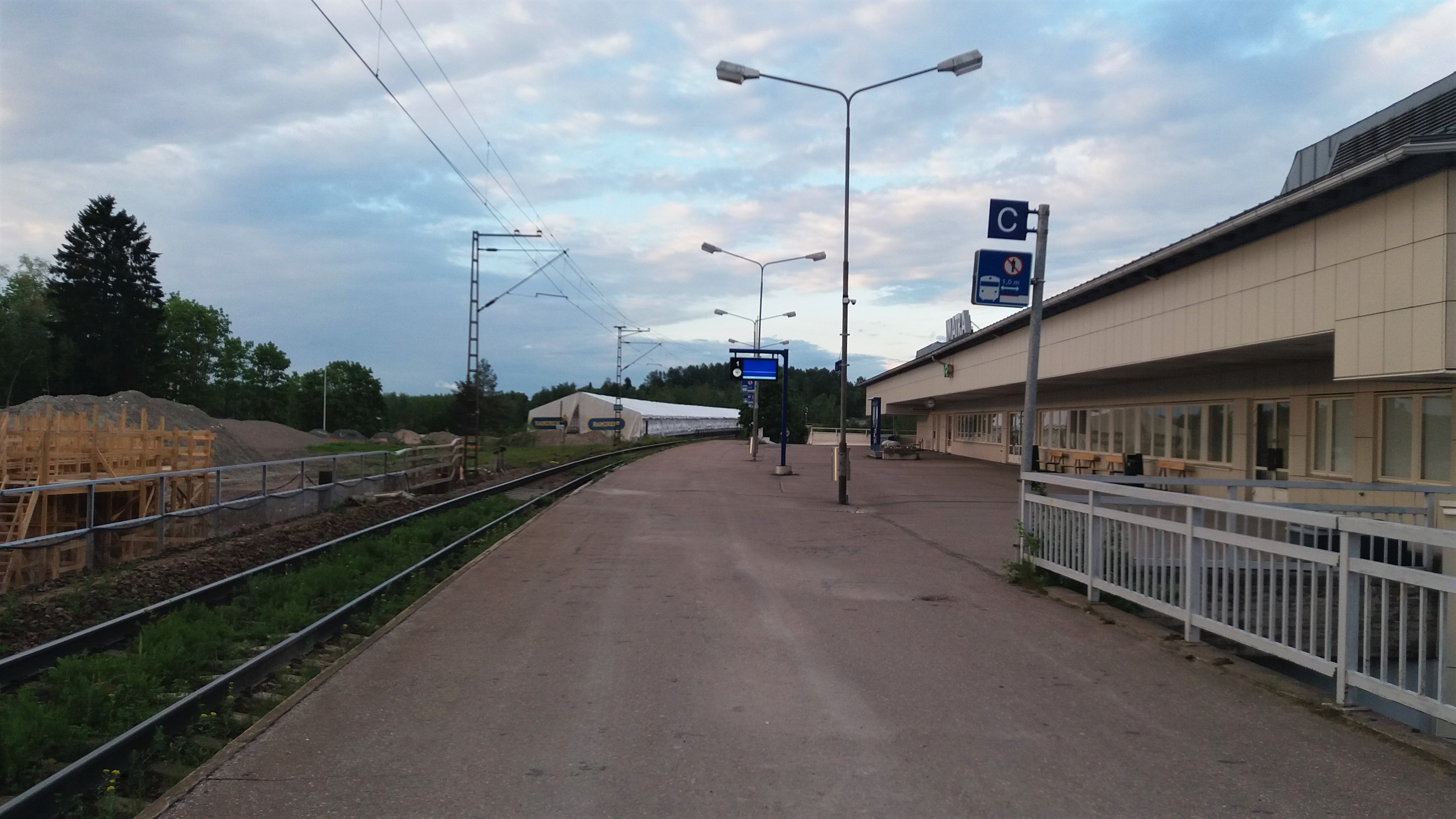

General information
- Location: Koskikatu 1, 55120; Mansikkala, Imatra; Finland
- Coordinates: 61°11′45″N 028°46′36″E
- System: VR station
- Owner: Finnish Transport Infrastructure Agency
- Operator: VR Group
- Line: Kouvola–Joensuu
- Platforms: 1 side platform

Other information
- Station code: Imr
- Classification: Part of split operating point (Imatra)

History
- Opened: 1 March 1977

Passengers
- 2008: 165,000

Services
Preceding station	VR Group	Following station
Joutseno towards Kouvola	Kouvola–Joensuu	Simpele towards Joensuu
Location
- Location within South Karelia Location within Finland

The Imatra railway station (Finnish: Imatran rautatieasema, Swedish: Imatra järnvägsstation) is located in the town of Imatra, Finland, in the district of Mansikkala. It is located along the Kouvola–Joensuu railway, and its neighboring stations are Joutseno in the west and Simpele in the east.

== Services ==
Imatra is served by all long-distance trains (InterCity and Pendolino) that use the Kouvola–Joensuu line as part of their route; it is also the terminus for several of these services.
