= Karelia Aviation Museum =

Aviation museum in Lappeenranta, Finland

Coordinates: 61°02′27.5″N 028°08′27″E

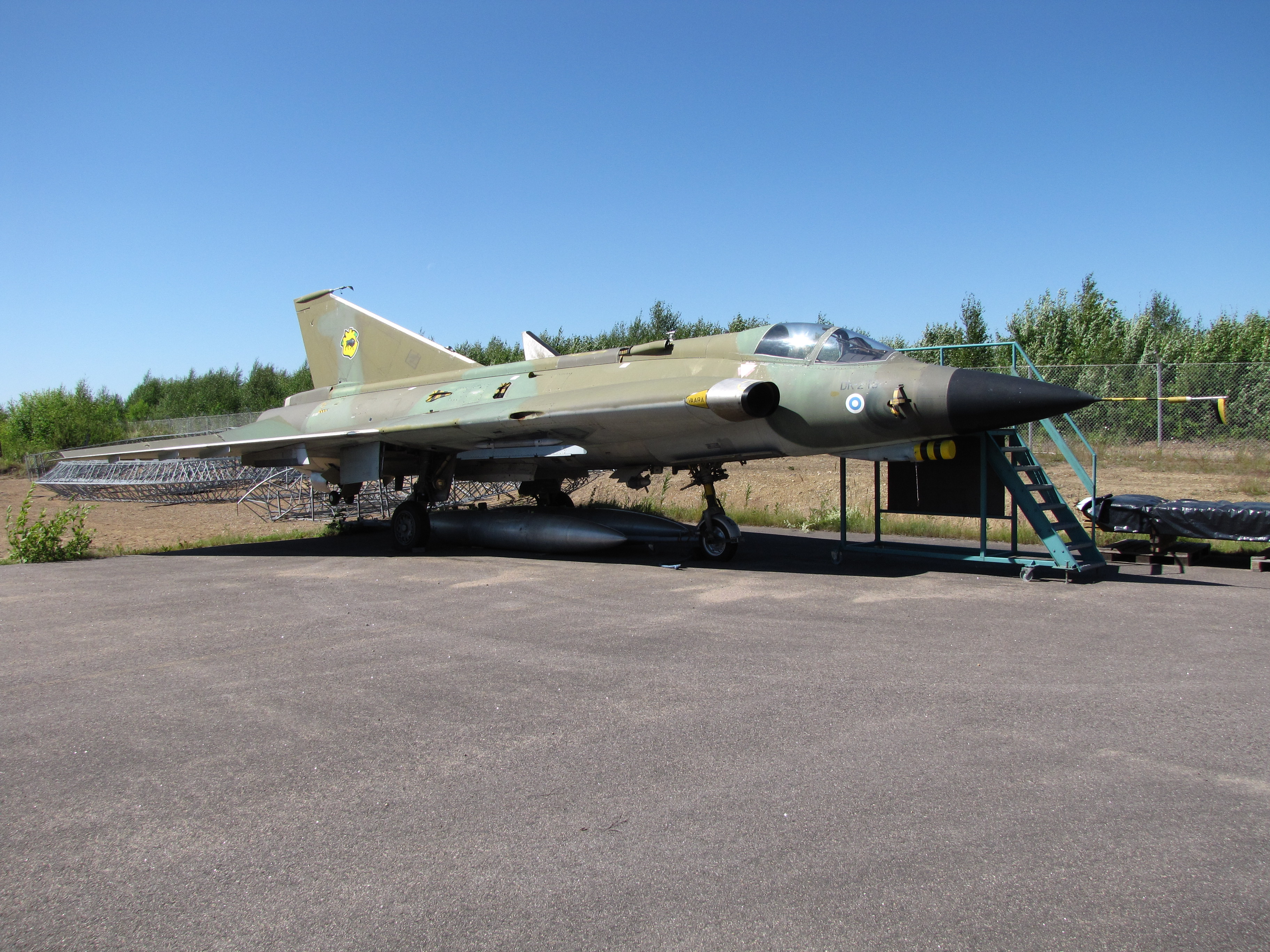
Saab 35 Draken in Karelian aviation museum

The Karelia Aviation Museum (Finnish: Karjalan Ilmailumuseo) is located at Lappeenranta Airport in Lappeenranta, Finland. The museum is run by Kaakkois-Suomen ilmailumuseoyhdistys ry. The museum has also been known as the Aviation Museum of South-Eastern Finland (Finnish: Kaakkois-Suomen ilmailumuseo).

The museum is housed in two covered halls and displays fighter aircraft and smaller objects from the Second World War and onwards.

Aircraft on display include:

- MiG-21BIS (MG-127),
- Saab 35 Draken (DK-213),
- Saab 91 Safir (OH-SFB), as well as
- Jorma Kettunen's Nieuport 17 replica (OH-U323).

In 2005 the museum also had a Hawker Hurricane (HC-452) on loan from the Aviation Museum of Central Finland.

Among the smaller objects on display is a radial engine from a Fokker C.X that sank in Lake Saimaa, engine and different parts from a Tupolev SB that went down in Ylämaa.

The museum is closed during winters.
