= Onttola railway station =

Railway station in Joensuu, Finland

Coordinates: 62°38′12″N 29°41′47″E

Onttola railway station (abbrev. Ont, Finnish: Onttolan rautatieasema) is a train station along the Pieksämäki–Joensuu line in Finland. The station is located approximately 7 kilometres (4.3 mi) away from Joensuu railway station. The station opened in 1927 and was closed for passenger traffic in 1975.

The original log-frame station building was built according to plans drawn up by Jarl Ungern and was completed in 1926. The original station building was dismantled in 1999 and its log frame was moved to the town of Nurmes, where it was renovated and turned into the reception building for LomaSirmakka. The reception building was officially opened in June 2005.
