= Lappeenranta =

Lappeenranta Villmanstrand
- City
- Lappeenrannan kaupunki Villmanstrands stad City of Lappeenranta
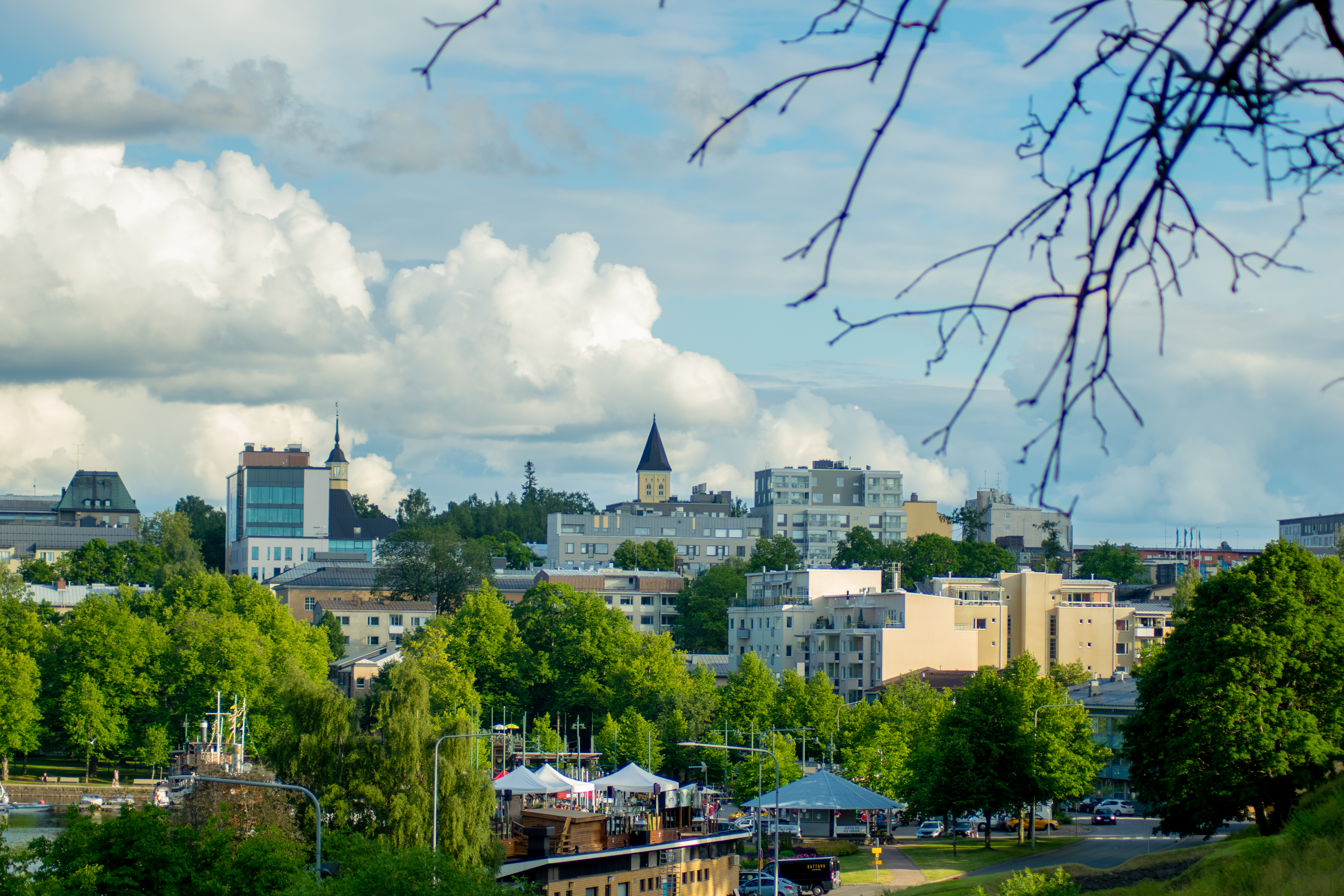
- The city landscape

- Coat of arms
- Nickname: Lepra
- Location of Lappeenranta in Finland
- Interactive map of Lappeenranta
- Coordinates: 61°04′N 028°11′E
- Country: Finland
- Region: South Karelia
- Sub-region: Lappeenranta sub-region
- Charter: 1649

Government
  - City manager: Tuomo Sallinen

Area (2018-01-01)
  - Total: 1,723.56 km^{2} (665.47 sq mi)
  - Land: 1,433.99 km^{2} (553.67 sq mi)
  - Water: 290.14 km^{2} (112.02 sq mi)
  - Rank: 47th largest in Finland

Population (2025-12-31)
  - Total: 73,241
  - Rank: 13th largest in Finland
  - Density: 51.07/km^{2} (132.3/sq mi)

Population by native language
  - Finnish: 87.9% (official)
  - Swedish: 0.2%
  - Others: 11.9%

Population by age
  - 0 to 14: 13.6%
  - 15 to 64: 62.1%
  - 65 or older: 24.2%
- Time zone: UTC+02:00 (EET)
  - Summer (DST): UTC+03:00 (EEST)
- Climate: Dfc
- Website: www.lappeenranta.fi/en

Lappeenranta (Finnish: [ˈlɑpːeːnˌrɑntɑ]; Swedish: Villmanstrand) is a city in Finland and the regional capital of South Karelia. It is located in the southeastern interior of the country and in the Finnish Lakeland. The population of Lappeenranta is approximately 73,000, while the sub-region has a population of approximately 88,000. It is the 13th most populous municipality in Finland, and the 11th most populous urban area in the country.

Lappeenranta is located on the shore of Lake Saimaa, 30 kilometres (19 miles) from the Russian border and 64 kilometres (40 mi) from the city of Vyborg. Lappeenranta is one of the most important urban centres in the entire Saimaa region, together with the cities of Imatra, Mikkeli and Savonlinna. Lappeenranta incorporated the late municipalities of Lappee and Lauritsala in 1967, Nuijamaa in 1989, Joutseno in 2009 and Ylämaa in 2010.

Lappeenranta, the region's tourism centre, is the second most visited city in Finland by Russian tourists after Helsinki and competes with Helsinki for the largest share of tax-free sales in Finland. Lappeenranta is a model for renewable energy and a clean living environment. Lappeenranta was the only Finnish city among the 14 finalists of the international Earth Hour City Challenge 2014 organised by WWF. In 2009, Lappeenranta was ranked fourth in the comparison of the largest Finnish cities, while in the 2008 survey the city was ranked fifth. In a survey conducted among business representatives in 2011, Lappeenranta was ranked 17th among Finnish cities in terms of image.

Lappeenranta Airport, opened in 1918 and located in the city centre, is Finland's oldest operating airport.

== Etymology ==
The name Lappeenranta consists of the genitive of Lappee (the name of the original core town) and the common noun ranta which means "shore". The harbor was known as Lapvesi ("lap water"). The history of Lappeenranta includes the rural municipality of Lappee and the hundred of Lapvesi. The Swedish name Villmanstrand contains the words vildman meaning "wild man" and strand also meaning "shore". A wild man is depicted on Lappeenranta's coat of arms.

== History ==
Historical affiliations

- Sweden 1649–1741
- Russian Empire 1741–1917
- (as part of Grand Duchy of Finland 1812-1917)
- Finland 1917–1918
- Finnish Socialist Workers' Republic 1918
- Finland 1918–present

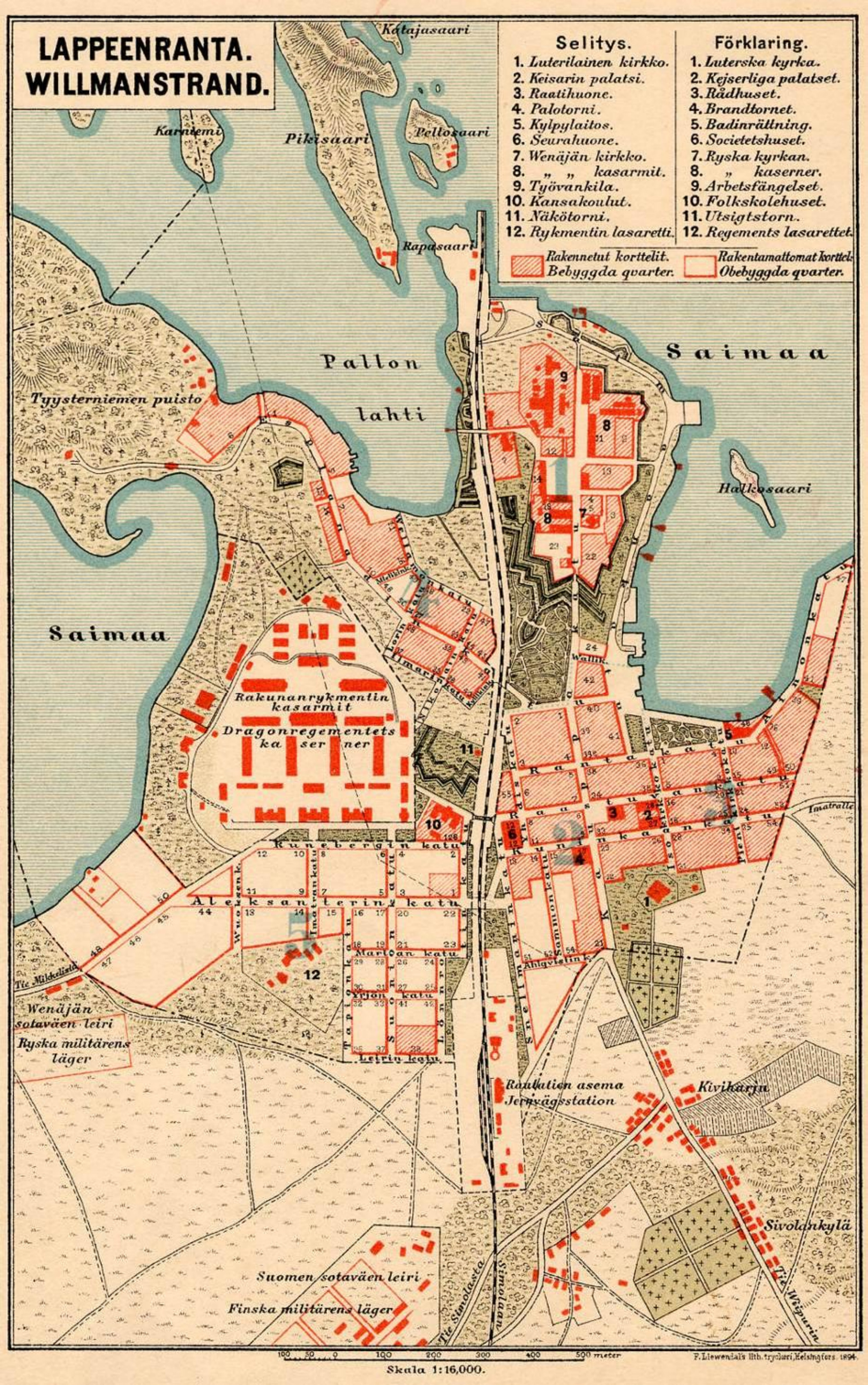
Map of Lappeenranta in the 1890s

The village of Kauskila, located about eight kilometers to the south of downtown Lappeenranta, was among the most significant Karelian population centers in South Karelia during the Middle Ages. Kauskila has been continuously inhabited for approximately 2,000 years.

Lappeenranta's original core settlement, Lapvesi, later Lappee, was originally formed around a headland jutting into Lake Saimaa, the site of the present fortress. The public market was established here, which became so important as a trading place that general Governor Count Per Brahe the Younger proposed that the Swedish government should grant town privileges to Lapvesi. The town was chartered in 1649 by Queen Christina of Sweden. At the time, Lapvesi was an important port for tar.

Between 1721 and 1743, Lappeenranta was the capital of Kymmenegård and Nyslott County and during this period the Swedes built the fortress out in stages.

In 1741, the Battle of Villmanstrand was fought between the Swedish and Russian armies in the Russo-Swedish War of 1741–1743. The battle ended in a Russian victory. The town was pillaged, wooden structures including the provincial chancellery were burnt and the ecclesiastical archives damaged. The remaining portion of Old Finland still belonging to Sweden, including Lappeenranta, was ceded by Sweden to Russia per the Treaty of Turku. Following the creation of the Grand Duchy of Finland in 1809, Old Finland was joined to the Grand Duchy in 1812 as a gesture of goodwill by Alexander I of Russia.

Lappeenranta incorporated the neighbouring municipalities of Lappee and Lauritsala on 1 January 1967, Nuijamaa on 1 January 1989, Joutseno on 1 January 2009, and Ylämaa on 1 January 2010.

== Geography ==
Located on the southern shore of Lake Saimaa, Lappeenranta's neighboring municipalities on the Finnish side are Imatra, Lemi, Luumäki, Miehikkälä, Ruokolahti and Taipalsaari, and on the Russian side, neighbors include Svetogorsk and Kamennogorsk.

=== Climate ===
Lappeenranta has a humid continental climate of the warm-summer type (Köppen: Dfb). The summers are longer, although rarely hot, and usually warm. Some of the warmest summers in the country can be found here, due to its orientation: southern but inland. Being in an eastern part of Finland, the winters are often harsh but still mild compared to areas further east.

Anchorage has some similarities by being of marine influence of hot currents and at the same time of the marginal continentality. But Lappeenranta is still able to receive heat waves that cross Central Europe in a warmer climate than cool.

==== Climate changes ====
Between 2000 and 2017 the temperature change was greater than the whole previous century, with +1.2 °C (higher values than Helsinki or Oulu). Since 2000 the number of warm days (> 24 °C) has become 2 per year, while the 1900 data indicates only 2 days per decade. From the first half of the twentieth century the days above 24 °C changed from rare to occasional in the second half to regular in the present century. There was also a 17.5 decrease in temperature below −1 °C for the same comparison period. 2015 was the hottest year since 1900, having one of the less than 50 days with freezing days. Work to reduce the temperature increase has been carried out; the city is again among the best 45 cities in the world in the WWF City Challenge 2016. One of the goals is to reduce carbon dioxide by 30% by 2020 and zero emissions by 2050. Compared to the 1961-1990 climate norms and other older reference periods, the climate of Lappeenranta has changed somewhat as the average temperatures have warmed up and as well, the total amount of precipitation has also increased somewhat.

Climate data for Lappeenranta airport, 1991-2020 normals, extremes 1961 - present
Month	Jan	Feb	Mar	Apr	May	Jun	Jul	Aug	Sep	Oct	Nov	Dec	Year
Record high °C (°F)	7.5 (45.5)	7.5 (45.5)	14.8 (58.6)	24.0 (75.2)	30.7 (87.3)	32.7 (90.9)	34.6 (94.3)	33.6 (92.5)	27.1 (80.8)	19.2 (66.6)	11.4 (52.5)	9.2 (48.6)	34.6 (94.3)
Mean daily maximum °C (°F)	−4.0 (24.8)	−3.8 (25.2)	0.9 (33.6)	7.9 (46.2)	15.3 (59.5)	19.6 (67.3)	22.4 (72.3)	20.4 (68.7)	14.5 (58.1)	7.1 (44.8)	1.7 (35.1)	−1.5 (29.3)	8.4 (47.1)
Daily mean °C (°F)	−6.7 (19.9)	−6.9 (19.6)	−2.7 (27.1)	3.5 (38.3)	10.2 (50.4)	14.9 (58.8)	17.8 (64.0)	15.9 (60.6)	10.7 (51.3)	4.5 (40.1)	−0.4 (31.3)	−4.0 (24.8)	4.7 (40.5)
Mean daily minimum °C (°F)	−9.4 (15.1)	−9.6 (14.7)	−6.1 (21.0)	−0.6 (30.9)	5.1 (41.2)	10.1 (50.2)	13.2 (55.8)	11.9 (53.4)	7.3 (45.1)	1.9 (35.4)	−2.3 (27.9)	−6.1 (21.0)	1.3 (34.3)
Record low °C (°F)	−36.8 (−34.2)	−33.3 (−27.9)	−28.0 (−18.4)	−16.8 (1.8)	−6.0 (21.2)	−1.2 (29.8)	4.4 (39.9)	1.7 (35.1)	−4.8 (23.4)	−12.1 (10.2)	−21.1 (−6.0)	−30.8 (−23.4)	−36.8 (−34.2)
Average precipitation mm (inches)	44.0 (1.73)	34.5 (1.36)	34.2 (1.35)	28.7 (1.13)	41.0 (1.61)	57.1 (2.25)	71.4 (2.81)	73.0 (2.87)	57.5 (2.26)	63.5 (2.50)	57.8 (2.28)	48.7 (1.92)	611.4 (24.07)
Average precipitation days (≥ 1.0 mm)	10.0	8.0	8.0	7.0	7.0	8.0	10.0	12.0	11.0	12.0	13.0	12.0	118
Mean monthly sunshine hours	33.2	72.6	132.3	179.9	262.6	267.0	259.9	209.1	123.6	71.6	24.5	18.7	1,655
Source: NOAA

== Demographics ==
=== Population ===
Historical population
Year	Pop.	±% p.a.
1815	235	—
1850	1,331	+5.08%
1870	1,121	−0.85%
1890	1,703	+2.11%
1910	3,000	+2.87%
1920	3,329	+1.05%
1930	3,995	+1.84%
1939	13,333	+14.33%
1972	67,088	+5.02%
1980	68,814	+0.32%
1990	68,662	−0.02%
2000	70,587	+0.28%
2010	71,982	+0.20%
2020	72,662	+0.09%
Source: Tilastollinen päätoimisto, Statistics Finland (1972-2020)

The city of Lappeenranta has 73,241 inhabitants, making it the 13th most populous municipality in Finland. The Lappeenranta region has a population of 88,091.

Population size 1990–2025
Year	Population
1990	68,662
1995	69,850
2000	70,587
2005	71,435
2010	71,982
2015	72,875
2020	72,662
2025	73,241

=== Languages ===
Population by
mother tongue (2025)
1. Finnish (87.9%)
2. Russian (4.40%)
3. Chinese (0.60%)
4. English (0.60%)
5. Ukrainian (0.50%)
6. Persian (0.50%)
7. Urdu (0.50%)
8. Other (5.00%)

Lappeenranta is a monolingual Finnish-speaking municipality. The majority of the population, 64,381 persons (87.9%), spoke Finnish as their first language. In addition, the number of Swedish speakers was 123 persons (0.2%) of the population. Foreign languages were spoken by 11.9% of the population. As English and Swedish are compulsory school subjects, functional bilingualism or trilingualism acquired through language studies is not uncommon.

At least 50 different languages are spoken in Lappeenranta. The most commonly spoken foreign languages are Russian (4.4%), Chinese (0.6%), English (0.6%) and Ukrainian (0.5%).

=== Immigration ===
Population by country of birth (2025)
Country of birth	Population	%
Finland	64,775	88.4
Soviet Union	2,415	3.3
Russia	724	1.0
China	490	0.7
Pakistan	350	0.5
Iran	344	0.5
Bangladesh	311	0.4
Turkey	243	0.3
Sri Lanka	241	0.3
Ukraine	238	0.3
Other	3,008	4.1

As of 2024, there were 8,339 persons with a foreign background living in Lappeenranta, or 11% of the population. (Note: Statistics Finland classifies a person as having a "foreign background" if both parents or the only known parent were born abroad.) The number of residents who were born abroad was 7,942, or 11% of the population. The number of persons with foreign citizenship living in Lappeenranta was 5,516. Most foreign-born citizens came from the former Soviet Union, Russia, China and Iran.

The relative share of immigrants in Lappeenranta's population is the same as to the national average. Moreover, the city's new residents are increasingly of foreign origin. This will increase the proportion of foreign residents in the coming years.

=== Religion ===
In 2023, the Evangelical Lutheran Church was the largest religious group with 66.8% of the population of Lappeenranta. Other religious groups accounted for 2.6% of the population. 30.5% of the population had no religious affiliation.

== Economy ==
The city's main employers are the:

- City of Lappeenranta
- Fazer
- Lappeenranta University of Technology
- Nordkalk
- Paroc
- Metso Outotec
- South Karelia Social and Health Care District
- The Armed Forces
- UPM-Kymmene
- VR Group

== Tourism ==
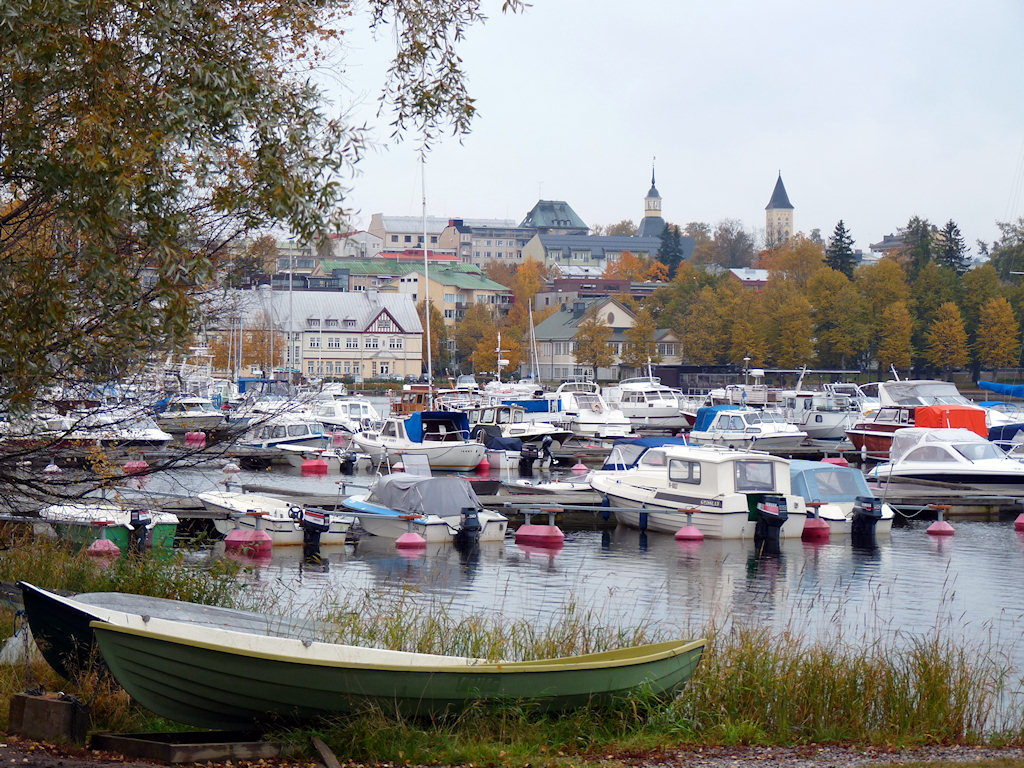
Autumn in Lappeenranta

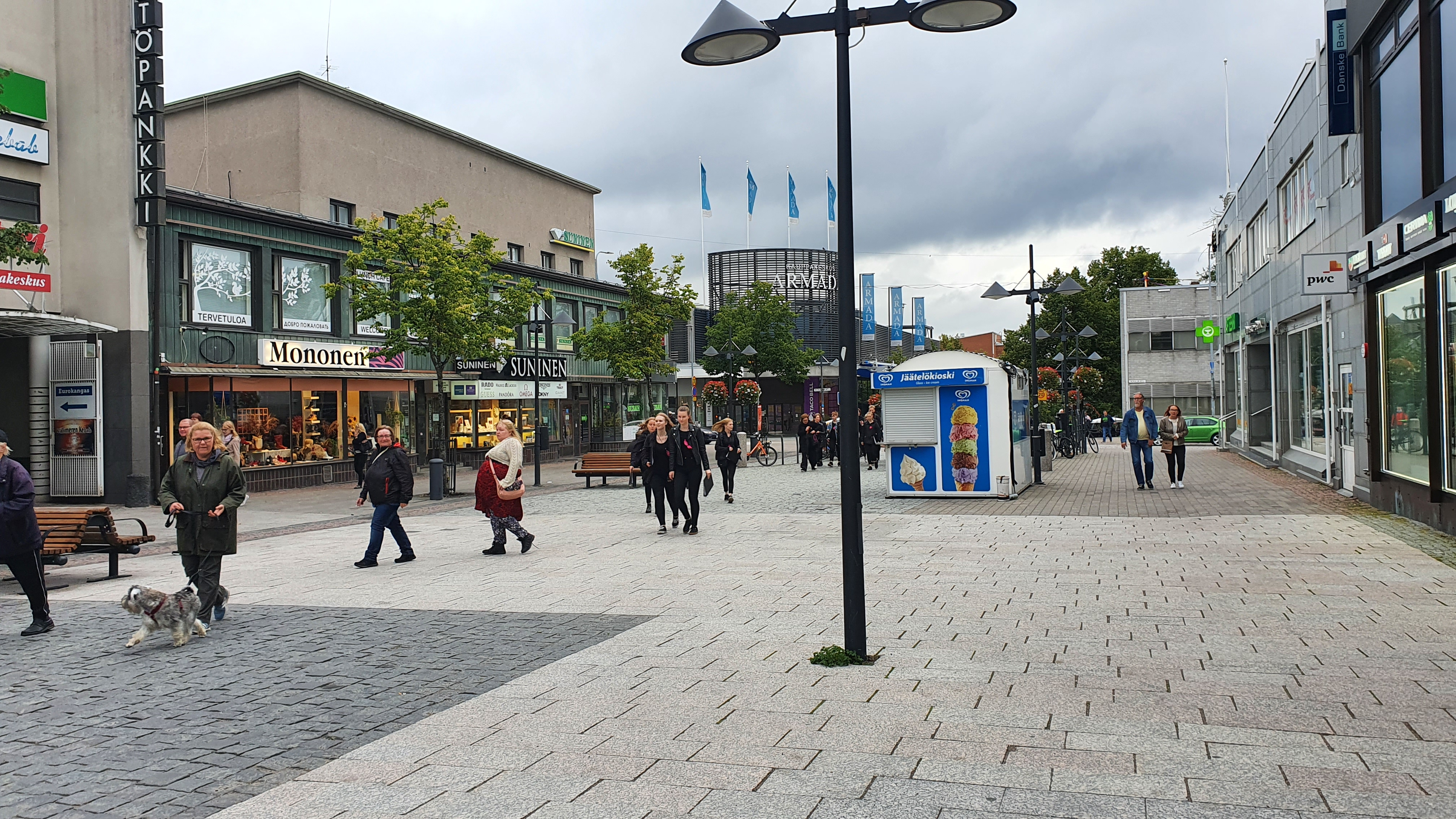
Pedestrian street in the city center

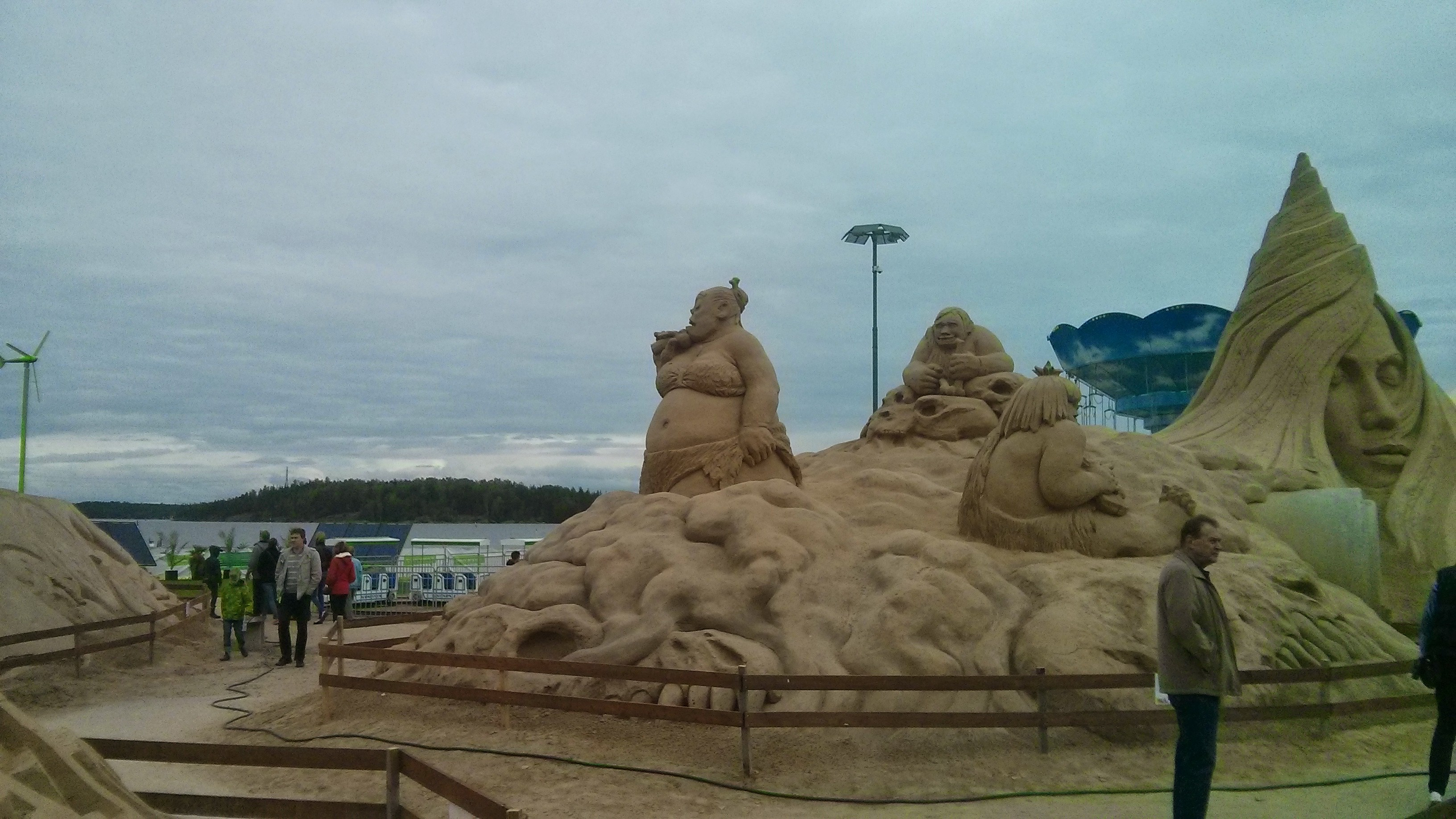
Huge sand art in Lappeenranta

Lappeenranta is known as a summer city, mostly due to its closeness to Lake Saimaa, Europe's 4th largest lake. The eponymous GoSaimaa (www.gosaimaa.com) provides all the touristic activities in the area. In addition, its inland location means that summers tend to be warmer and winters colder than along the coastal areas.

Lappeenranta has a healthy winter tourism industry. Various cabins around Lake Saimaa, as well as numerous snowmobiles, Nordic skating, floating in the river, reindeer rides, paragliding, skiing and sledding tracks draw a fair number of winter visitors. The proximity of the Russian border is increasingly evident in the number of Russian tourists visiting the city. In fact, Lappeenranta is closer to Saint Petersburg (195 km or 121 miles) than it is to Helsinki, the capital of Finland (220 km or 140 miles). The presence of Russian tourists is noticeable by the many Russian registered cars on the streets and the use of Cyrillic letters in signs of some shops.

=== Places and events ===
- The old fortress, with a number of museums, cafés and the oldest Orthodox church in Finland.
- St. Mary's Church of Lappee, an 18th-century wooden church in the center of the city.
- The harbour area, with cruises to Vyborg and the nearby Saimaa Canal.
- The central market place, where you can enjoy the local specialities, such as meat pies known as "Atomi" (atom) or "Vety" (hydrogen).
- The Night of The Fortess, a two-day cultural festival held in early August.
- The Lappeenranta Ballet Gala in late August.
- The annual Lappeenranta National Singing Contest.
- The biggest sand castle in Finland is built next to Port of Lappeenranta every summer.
- There are three private cinema theatres in Lappeenranta: Kino-Aula, Nuijamies and Finnkino.
- Major league home games in ice-hockey (SaiPa), basketball (Namika Lappeenranta) and other sports.
- The IIHF World Championship Under 18, in 2014
- Unlimited Racing Event, on 27 and 29 June 2014

== Sports ==
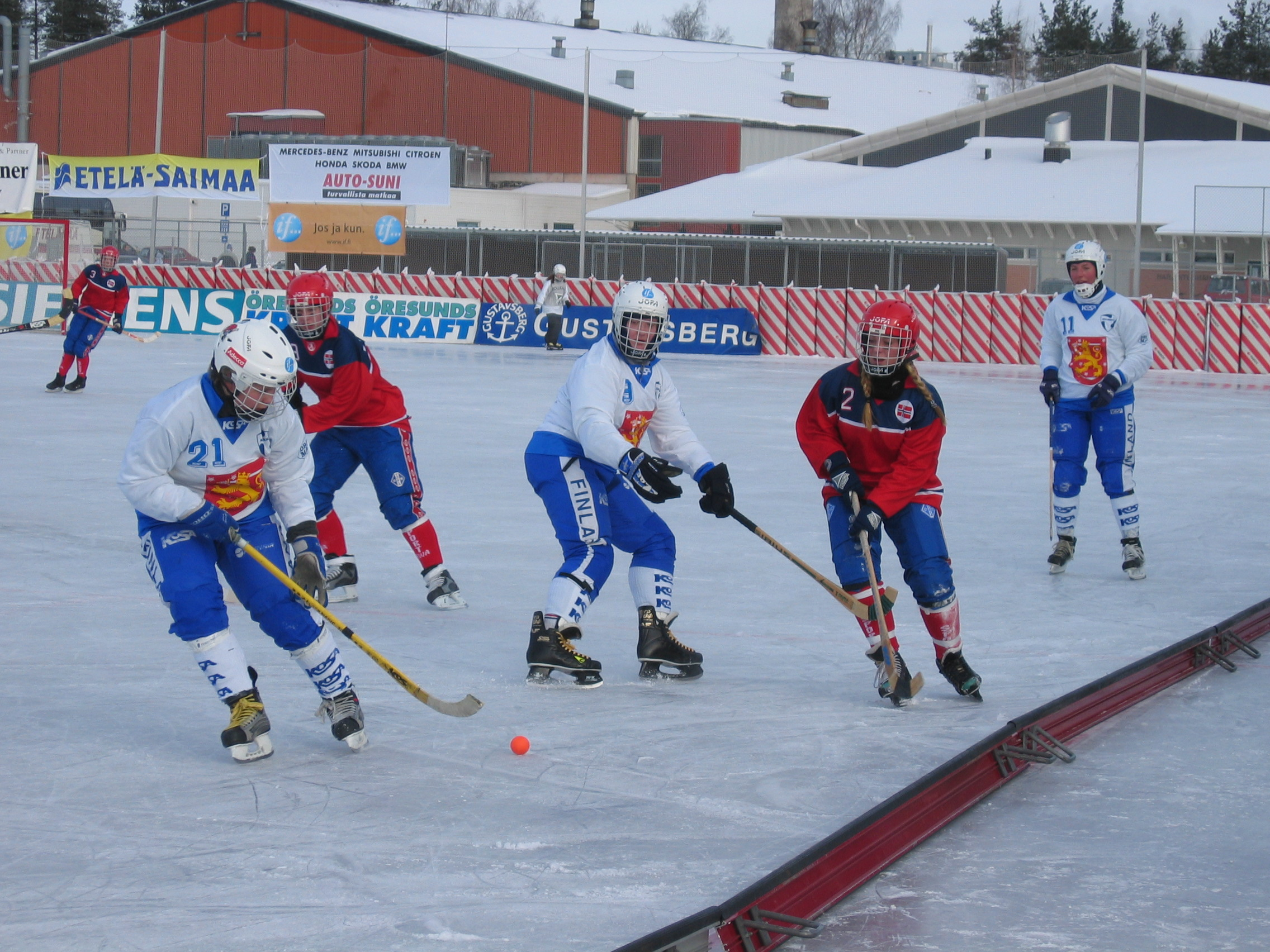
Finland against Norway during the 2004 Women's Bandy World Championship

Lappeenranta has several sports teams playing in top levels of Finnish sports leagues.

SaiPa is an ice hockey team playing in the highest level in Finland, SM-liiga. SaiPa was fourth in the national Ice hockey league in the season of 2013–2014. 2014 IIHF Ice Hockey U18 World Championship - Tournament was played Kisapuisto Ice Hall, Lappeenranta & Imatra Ice Hall during 17–27 April 2014. United States won the tournament, Czech Republic was second and Canada was the third.

Lappeenranta has long been known as one of Finland's basketball cities; Lappeenrannan NMKY is a basketball team playing in the third highest level in I-division B and have won two championships in 2005 and 2006.

NST plays floorball in the Salibandyliiga and Rajaritarit is an American football team in the Vaahteraliiga.

Lappeenrannan Veiterä, or just Veiterä, plays in Bandyliiga and has been Finnish champions five times, including in 2017. They have been the champions for women and for girls born in 1995 and 1998. The city hosted the first ever Women's Bandy World Championship in 2004 and in 2014 the tournament was again played in Lappeenranta. The Old Boys World Cup is annually hosted in town, in 2017 for the seventh time.

In women's sports Catz Lappeenranta plays basketball and Pesä Ysit plays Finnish baseball, both in the top leagues of the nation. Catz has won Finnish national basketball championship four times in a row.

== Transport ==
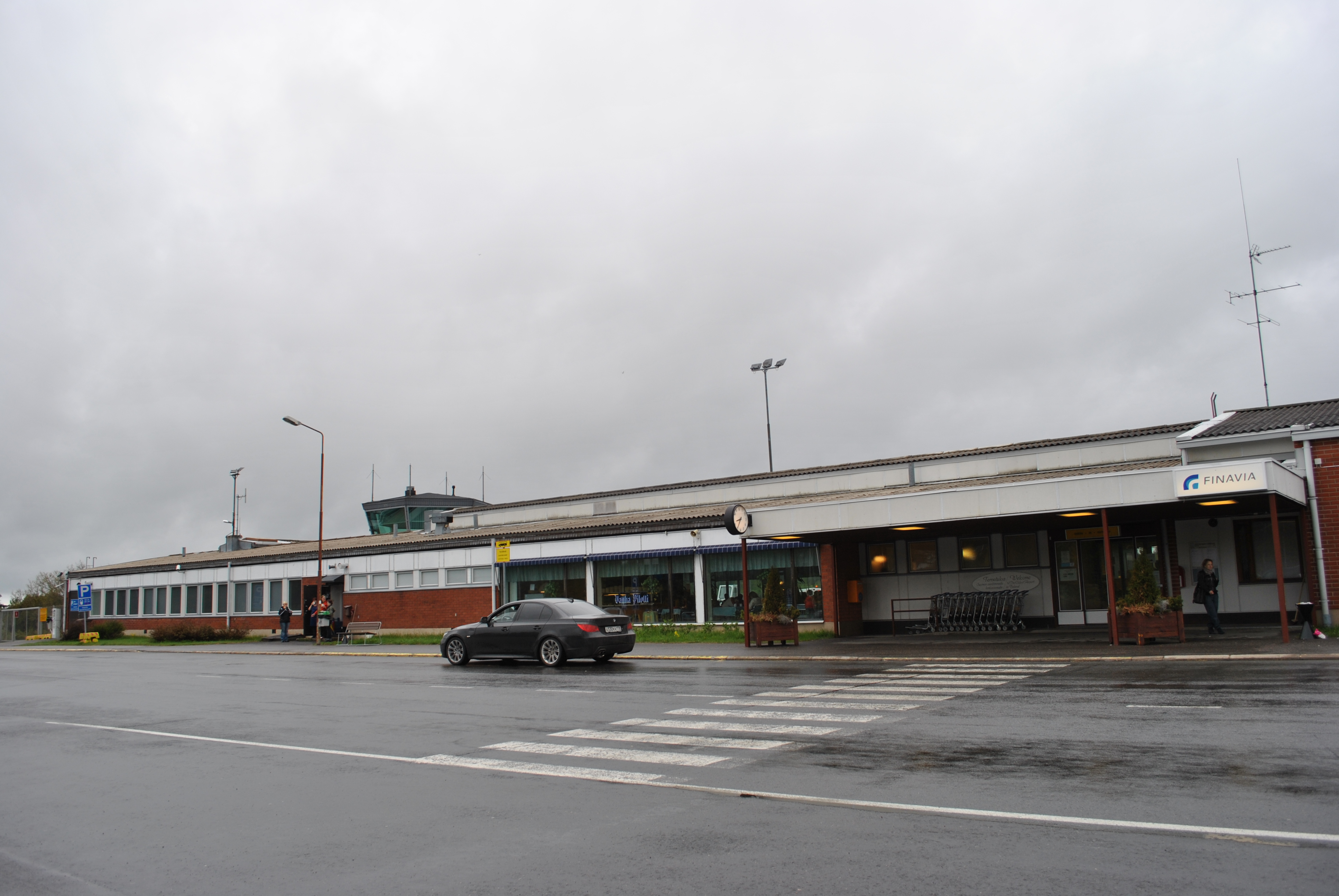
The Lappeenranta Airport terminal

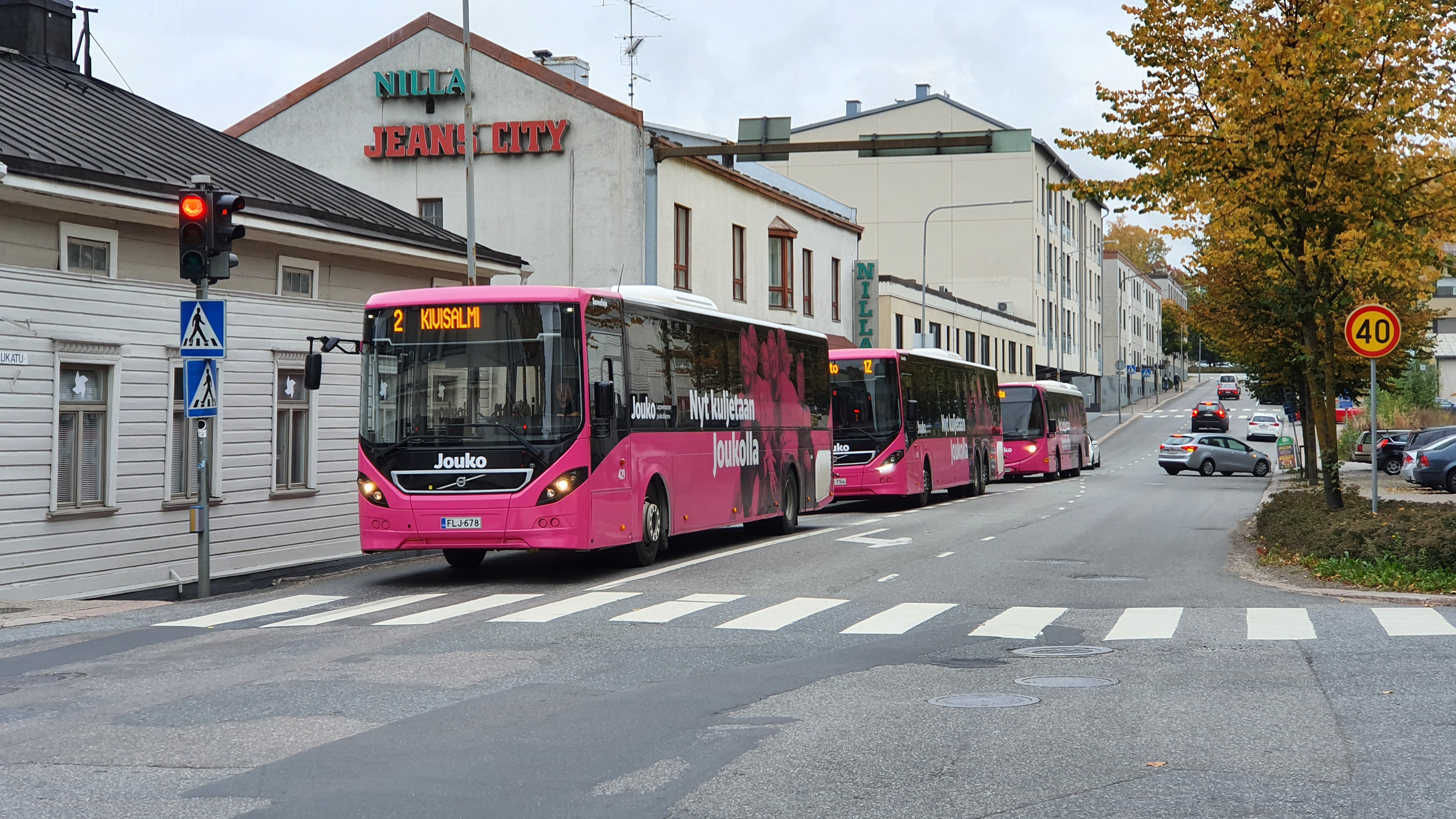
Jouko sub-urban buses in city center of Lappeenranta, Koulukatu street, 29th of September 2020

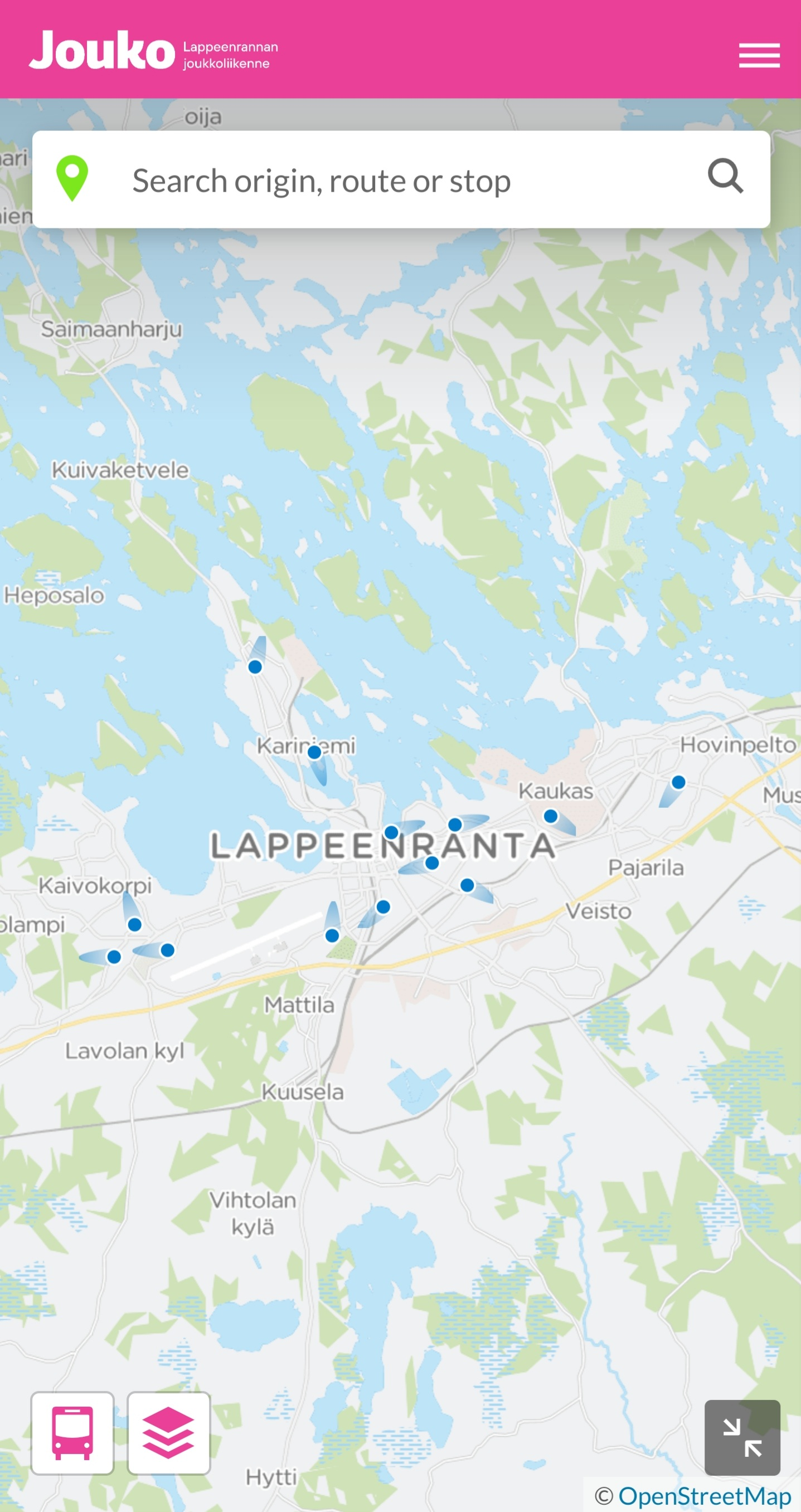
Jouko route guide app (Digitransit) in mobile phone

Lappeenranta is connected to neighbouring cities and municipalities by road. The city is located 215 kilometres (134 mi) from Helsinki and 195 kilometres (121 mi) from St. Petersburg. From Lappeenranta, the distance to Joensuu, the capital of North Karelia, is 233 kilometres (145 mi) along Highway 6.

There are multiple daily train departures to destinations within Finland from the Lappeenranta and Joutseno stations and to Russia from Vainikkala station. The Allegro train service operating between Helsinki and St. Petersburg stops in Vainikkala, a village in Lappeenranta. The journey time to Helsinki is about 2 hours and St. Petersburg about 1.5 hours.

During the summer, when Lake Saimaa and the Saimaa Canal are accessible by water, there is a visa-free connection by ship from Lappeenranta to Vyborg, Russia.

The regionally owned Lappeenranta Airport is located west of the city center. The airport predominantly serves charter flights to southern Europe, the Canary Islands and Madeira, as well as regularly scheduled flights on Irish airline Ryanair to Italy.

The public transport is by bus and is called Jouko. The Jouko-buses are pink-colored and they serve 17 sub-urban lines (1, 1X, 2, 2H, 3, 3K, 4, 5, 7, 8, 12, 14, 21, 22, 23, 24, 25) and 21 regional lines (100, 101, 110, 111, 112, 113, 114, 120, 121, 130, 131, 200, 201, 300, 301, 500, 601, 602, 603, 610, 620). Jouko has Waltti-travel card, to which you can charge a 30-day season ticket (travel zones A-C) or a value tickets, which works also in other Finnish cities which do have the Waltti-ticket system. Other ways to buy a ticket in Jouko-buses are single tickets (payment with cash or credit card), mobile-tickets (PayIQ, etc.) and 24-hour ticket. Jouko has also own route-guide (https://lappeenranta.digitransit.fi/), where you can plan a route, see timetables and also see all the Jouko-buses in the map. You can also view delays, exceptions, and other releases. Jouko sub-urban transport is operated by Savonlinja. Regional lines are operated by Savonlinja, Kymen Charterline and Vento. The sub-urban bus fleet consists of low-floor city buses, and the bus models are Scania Citywide II Electric, Volvo 8900LE and Scania Citywide LE Suburban (two of them are CNG-buses).

=== Jouko sub-urban routes ===
- 1 University – Sammonlahti – City centre – Lauritsala – Kiiskinmäki
- 1X University – Sammonlahti – City centre
- 2 Kivisalmi – City centre – Lauritsala – Hovinpelto (on Sundays via central hospital)
- 2H Hovinpelto – Lauritsala – Railway station – Leiri – City centre
- 3 Leiri – Railway station – City centre – Pikisaari – Kariniemi – Kivisalmi
- 3K Kivisalmi – City centre – Leiri – Kesämäki
- 3K Kesämäki – Railway station – City centre – Kivisalmi
- 4 Mäntylä – City centre – Karhuvuori
- 4 City centre – Karhuvuori
- 5 University – Sammonlahti – City centre – Railway station
- 7 Mustola – Lauritsala – City centre
- 8 Kariniemi – Pikisaari – City centre – Sammonlahti – Ruoholampi – Rutola
- 12 University – Sammonlahti – City centre
- 12 Kivisalmi – City centre
- 12 University – Sammonlahti – City centre – Karhuvuori – Lauritsala – Hovinpelto – Mustola – Kiiskinmäki
- 12 Kiiskinmäki – Kanavansuu – Lauritsala – City centre – Kivisalmi
- 14 Mäntylä – City centre – Karhuvuori – Lauritsala – Mustola
- 21 Vuoksenniska – Sotkulampi – Imatrankoski – Mansikkala (Keskusasema / Central station) –Mustalampi – Vuoksenniska
- 22 Vuoksenniska – Mustalampi – Mansikkala (Keskusasema / Central station) – Imatrankoski – Sotkulampi – Vuoksenniska
- 23 Jakola – Imatrankoski – Mansikkala (Keskusasema / Central station) – Sienimäki – Vuoksenniska – Rautio – Huhtanen
- 24 Mansikkala (Keskusasema / Central station) – Imatrankoski – Meltola – Salo-Issakka – Perä-Meltola – Meltola – Imatrankoski – Mansikkala (Keskusasema / Central station)
- 25 Imatran Kylpylä (Imatra Spa) – Mansikkala (Keskusasema / Central station) – Saareksiinmäki – Meltola – Imatrankoski

== Education ==
Lappeenranta is known as an international university city in Finland with LUT University and LAB University of Applied Sciences which together have approximately 13,000 students from 68 countries. Lappeenranta is also a commercial centre of South-East Finland and the meeting point of the EU and Russia, 215 kilometres (134 mi) from both Helsinki and St. Petersburg.

Lappeenranta has numerous schools at almost all levels of education, including the LUT University, LAB University of Applied Sciences, located in a shared Skinnarila campus of around 8000 students, the Army Academy (branch of the Finnish Defence Forces), South Karelia Vocational College and South Karelia Adult Education Centre.

== Notable people ==
- Anna-Kaarina Aalto, physician and politician
- Antti Aalto (born 1975), former ice-hockey player
- Koop Arponen (born 1984), singer and winner of the fourth series of the Idols in 2008
- Ivan Fedotov (born 1996), Finnish-born Russian professional ice hockey goaltender
- Kaarlo Halttunen (born 1909), former actor
- Laila Hirvisaari (formerly Laila Hietamies), novelist. She has written a novel series about Lappeenranta and its people.
- Horna, Finnish black metal band
- Kari Jormakka, philosopher, architect and architecture theorist
- Kotiteollisuus, hard rock band
- Matti Lehtinen (1922–2022), operatic baritone
- Kiba Lumberg (born 1956), Finnish author and writer
- Pave Maijanen (1950–2021), musician
- Miikka Multaharju (born 1977), football player
- Jukka Paarma (born 1942), former Archbishop of Turku and Finland
- Tiia Piili (born 1979), gymnast
- Saku Puhakainen (born 1975), football player
- Jaska Raatikainen (born 1979), drummer of the band Children of Bodom
- Jaana Savolainen (born 1964), cross country skier
- Sargeist, Finnish black metal band
- Satanic Warmaster, Finnish black metal band
- Petri Skriko (born 1962), retired ice-hockey player in the NHL in US
- Juha Tiainen, former Olympic gold medallist in hammer throw
- Mokoma, thrash metal band
- Battlelore, symphonic metal band
- Hanna Pakarinen (born 1981), the first Idols winner in Finland came from Lappeenranta.
- Christian Ruuttu (born 1964), former ice hockey player in the NHL
- Vesa Vierikko (born 1956), Finnish actor
- Vesa Viitakoski (born 1971), former ice hockey player in SM-liiga

== In media ==
Lappeenranta is the setting for Bordertown, the Finnish police drama broadcast by Netflix.

== Twin towns – sister cities ==
Lappeenranta is twinned with:

- Rakvere, Estonia
- Stykkishólmur, Iceland
- Drammen, Norway
- Örebro, Sweden
- Kolding, Denmark
- Klin, Russia
- Schwäbisch Hall, Germany
- Szombathely, Hungary
- (United States) Lake Worth Beach, Florida, US
- Chernihiv, Ukraine

== See also ==
- Imatra
- Joensuu
- Saimaa Canal
