= Nordkalk =

Nordkalk Corporation
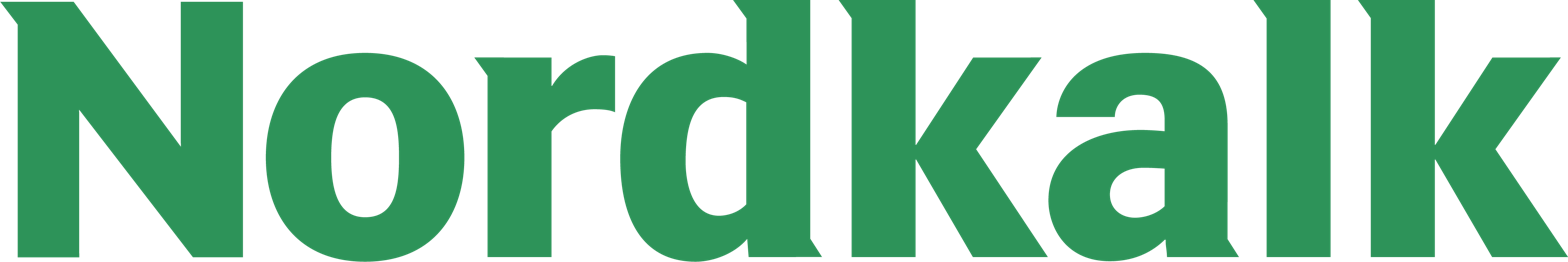
- Type: Corporation
- Industry: Minerals
- Founded: 1991
- Headquarters: Pargas, Finland
- Area served: Central and Northern Europe
- Operating income: 300 M€ (2018)
- Number of employees: 820
- Subsidiaries: Suomen Karbonaatti Oy
- Website: www.nordkalk.com

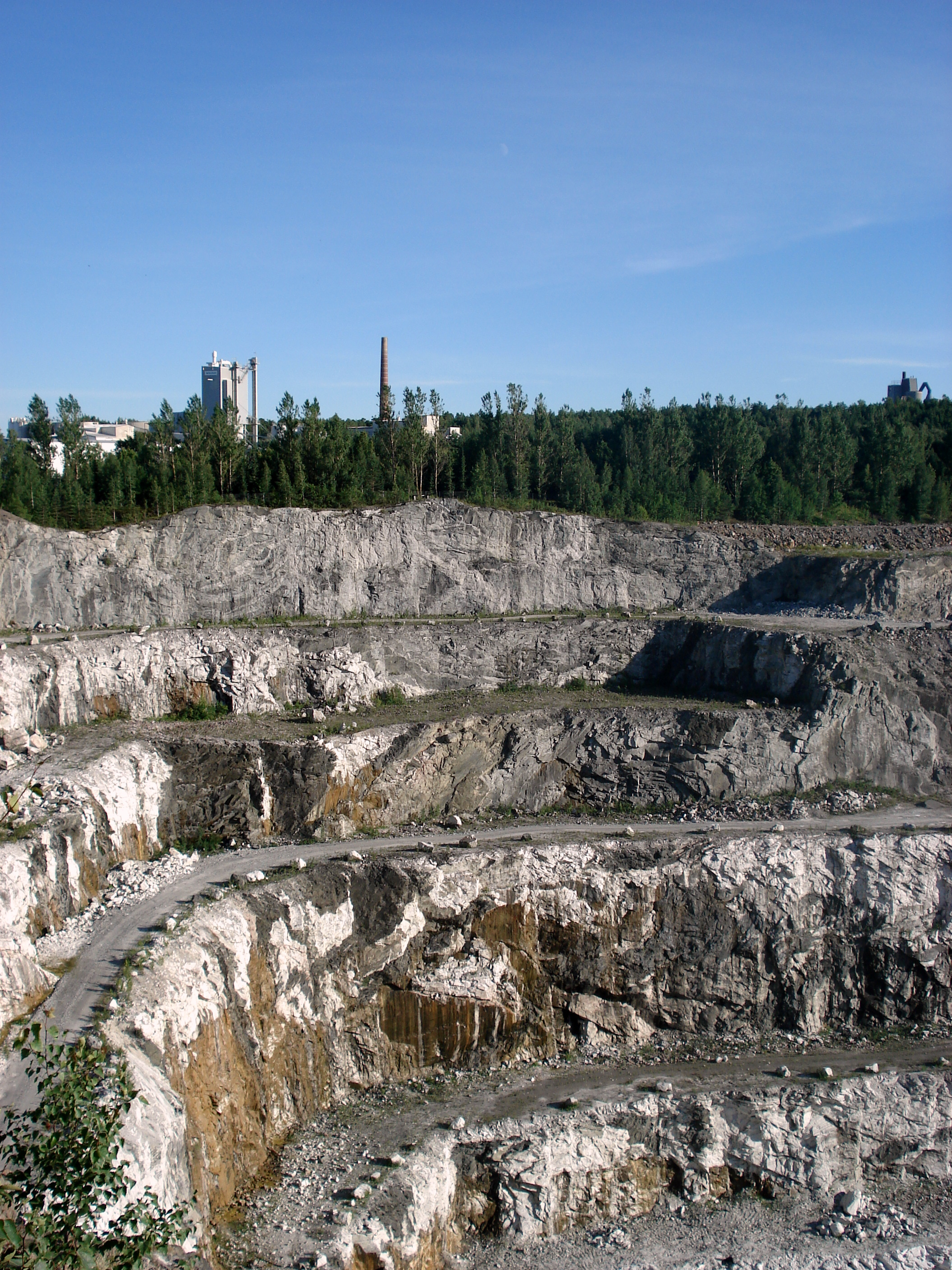
Nordkalk Limestone quarry at Pargas, Väståboland, Finland.

Nordkalk is a manufacturer of limestone-based products based in Finland. It operates at more than 30 different locations in Finland, Sweden, Norway, Poland and Estonia.

== History ==
Limestone has been quarried in Pargas at least since the 17th century, possibly as early as the 14th century. Industrial quarrying began on 26 November 1898 when the joint-stock company Pargas Kalkbergs Aktiebolag was established by Otto Moberg. Pargas Kalkbergs Aktiebolag later changed its name to Partek. Nordkalk was part of Partek until February 2003. In August 2010 Rettig Group Ltd becomes the sole owner of Nordkalk. Nordkalk Corporation continues to quarry and process limestone as a member of the Rettig Group. Nordkalk is a member of Cleantech Finland.

== Products ==
The main product groups of Nordkalk are:

- Limestone products (calcite or calcium carbonate and dolomite)
- Quicklime (calcium oxide) and slaked lime (calcium hydroxide)
- Raw materials for paper pigments (flotation calcite, quicklime)
- Wollastonite
