= Lappeenranta Central Station =

Train station in Finland

Lappeenranta Villmanstrand
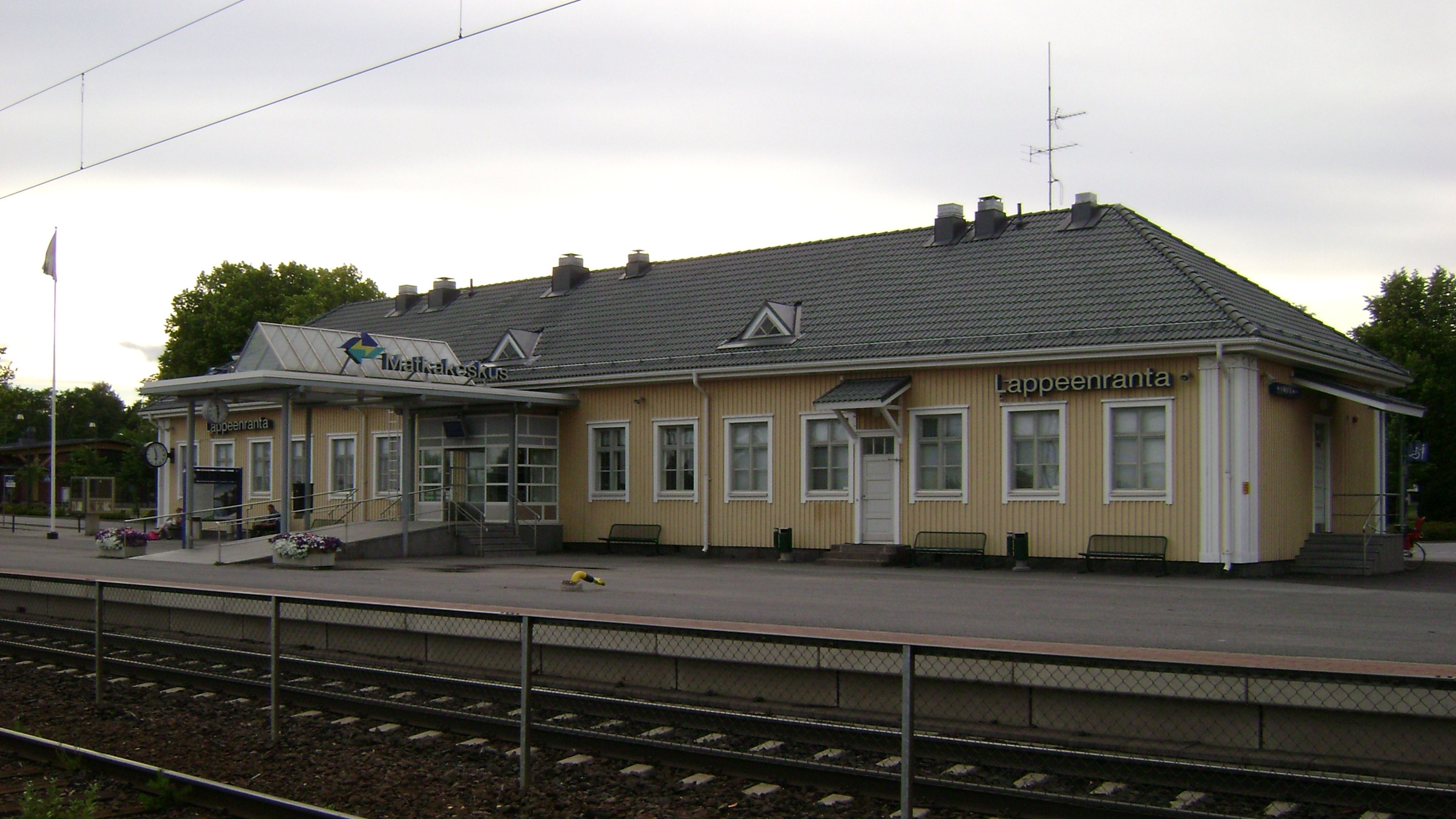

General information
- Location: Lappeenranta; Finland
- Coordinates: 61°02′53″N 28°11′42″E
- Owner: Finnish Transport Infrastructure Agency
- Operator: VR Group
- Platforms: 1
- Tracks: 2

Construction
- Structure type: At-grade

Services
Preceding station	VR Group	Following station
Kouvola towards Helsinki	Helsinki–Joensuu	Joutseno towards Joensuu
Location

Lappeenranta Central Station (Finnish: Lappeenrannan rautatieasema, Swedish language: Villmanstrands järnvägsstation) is a train station located in the city of Lappeenranta in Finland. The station is served by traffic to Helsinki and Joensuu.

The layout of the station building was changed in the early 2000s. The ticket office and incoming cargo deposit were transferred from the east side of the waiting room to the west side, and the café on the west side was transferred to the east side, without a wall in between.

The station has a taxi stop and local bus traffic stop.

There is a travel center next to Lappeenranta Central. It has Matkahuolto and post offices.

== Departure tracks ==
Lappeenranta railway station has three platform tracks. Track 2 is currently unused by passenger trains.

- Track 1 is used by the majority of the passenger trains both towards Helsinki and Joensuu.
- Track 3 is used by one train service to Helsinki.

== Night traffic ==
Up until the 1990s, two night passenger trains met at the Lappeenranta station at about 02:30 AM; the express train from Joensuu to Helsinki and the express train from Helsinki to Joensuu. In autumn 1993, they were transferred to go via Mikkeli. There is still nighttime express bus traffic via Lappeenranta.
