= Savonlinja =

Finnish bus company

- Founded: 1924
- Headquarters: Mikkeli
- Service area: Finland
- Service type: Bus
- Website: savonlinja.fi/en/

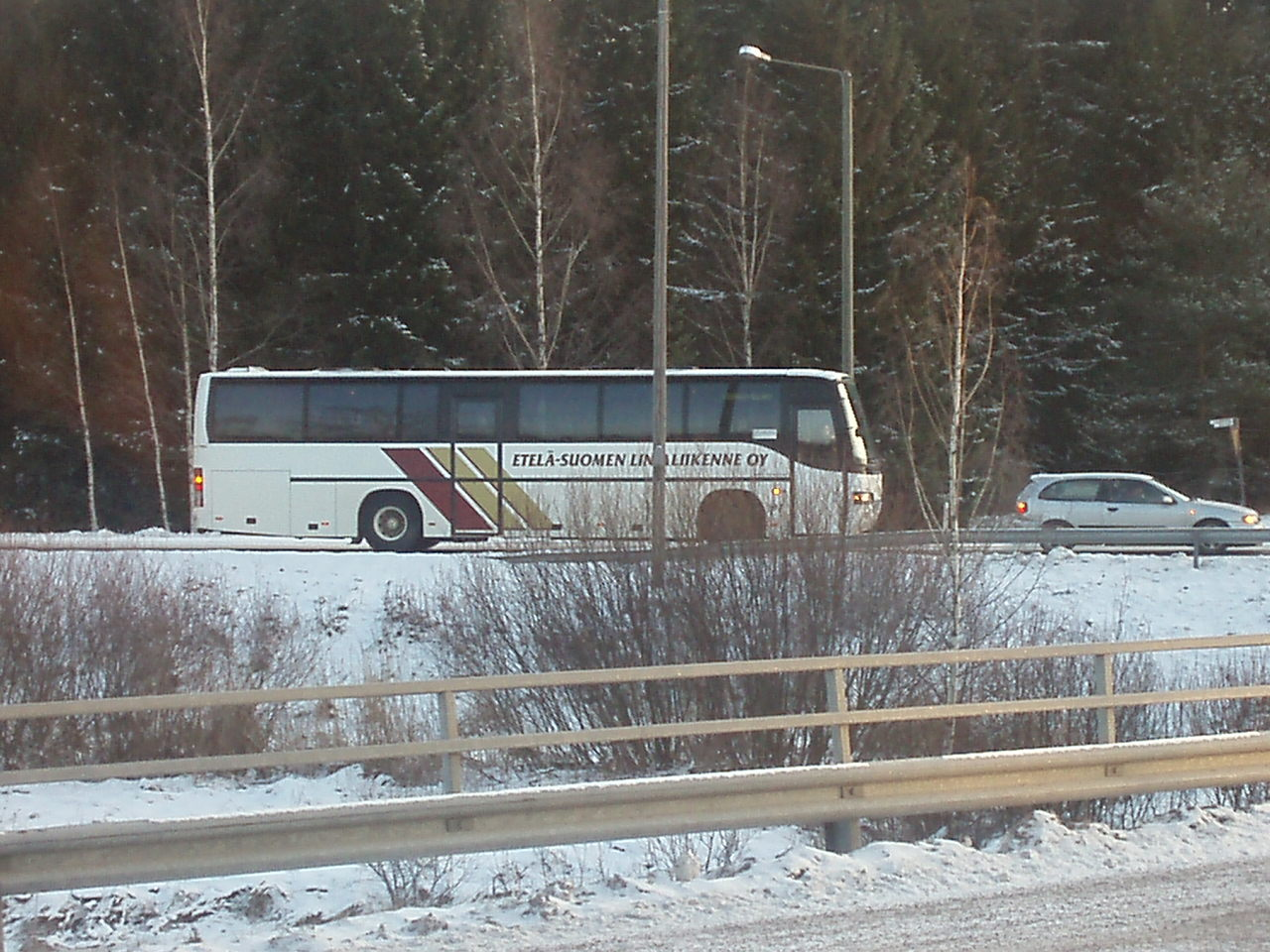
Etelä-Suomen Linjaliikenne Oy

The Savonlinja Group is a bus-service provider in Eastern Finland, and a public transport provider in Southern Finland.

In 1924 Toivo J. Honkanen, Senior Advisor for Finance and the founder of the Savonlinja Group, started a passenger service between Lappeenranta and Lauritsala with his Ford Model-T. Today the group is run by director Raimo O. Honkanen, Senior Advisor for Road Transport.

In addition to the Eastern Finland region, Helsinki and Turku and their surrounding areas are also core areas. The international traffic handled by the Savonlinja Group comprises a number of routes into Russia and Sweden. The range of services offered includes town and local traffic, service traffic for municipalities, rural traffic, school buses, ExpressBus services, passenger and tourist travel, a charter bus service and a travel agency.

The Savonlinja Group employs some 800 bus-transport professionals and owns over 500 buses.

== See also ==
- List of bus companies
