= Cleantech Finland =

Finnish national project

Cleantech Finland is a Finnish national project, backed by the Government of Finland and created as part of Finland's National Action plan to develop the country's environmental business. The network aims to bring together expertise from Finland's clean technology industry and research and to support clean technology companies internationally. Cleantech Finland is owned by the Confederation of Finnish Industries (Finnish: Elinkeinoelämän keskusliitto or EK).

Cleantech Finland's concept is based on the Finland's "national action plan for environmental business", which has been developed by representatives of the Finnish Government, such as the Finnish Ministry of Trade and Industry (now the Ministry of Employment and the Economy), the Ministry of Environment, other research and innovation agencies, environmental organisations and universities in 2006. The ownership of Cleantech Finland was moved from SITRA to the Confederation of Finnish Industries in December 2008. Cleantech Finland's digital expert service Solved spun-off as an independent company in September 2013.

== Strategy ==
The Strategic Cleantech Programme of the Government of Prime Minister Jyrki Katainen was launched in 2012. The strategic goal of the programme is for Finland to be known as a global superpower of cleantech in 2020.

The numerical goals for the strategic cleantech programme by 2020 as defined in the strategy of May 2014 are: ▪ to raise cleantech companies' turnover to EUR 50 billion, of which exports account for over 75% ▪ to double the cleantech home market to about EUR 20 billion ▪ to raise the number of cleantech companies from 2000 to about 3000 ▪ to create at least 40,000 jobs in clean technology in Finland.

== Management ==
Cleantech Finland is managed by Finpro (an association providing internationalization services for Finnish small and middle-sized enterprises), and through Finpro's global network, Cleantech Finland has offices in 40 countries.

Cleantech Finland seeks to provide a contact and cooperation platform for clean technology companies and organizations operating in following clean technology branches:

- Water
  - Efficient use of water
  - Purification
  - Waste water treatment
- Energy
  - CHP
  - Energy efficiency
  - Biomass & bioenergy
  - Renewable energy
  - Smart grid
- Waste
  - Industrial waste management
  - Logistics
  - Recycling
  - Waste-to-energy
- Built-environment
  - Air quality
  - Energy management systems
  - Low-energy housing
  - Smart mobility
  - Urban planning

== Purpose ==
According to the organization, its purpose is to provide a global network of clean technology expertise. It states that the cleantech sector in Finland comprises approximately 2,000 enterprises.

Cleantech Finland serves as an umbrella corporation and coordinator in internationalization efforts, such as conferences and seminars. Additionally, it aims to build contacts between environmental technology companies and national – as well as international – stakeholders.

In order to support its member organizations in financing their environmental research projects, Cleatech Finland is co-operating closely with numerous government-backed innovations support and finance organizations, of which the Finnish Funding Agency for Technology and Innovation (Tekes) and Finnish Innovation Fund (SITRA) are the most notable.

== Background ==
=== Cleantech Industry ===
Cleantech is a concept, which comprises knowledge-based products and services that improve operational performance in terms of sustainable development by using limited or zero non-renewable resources and creating significantly less waste than conventional technologies. A driving force behind cleantech concept is the growing concern of corporations and consumers about climate change and environment, energy costs, as well as energy security.

Motored by political, environmental, and economic developments, the industry has globally attracted increasing amount of venture capital investments with strong exit potential and it has brought new technologies to the markets. International Energy Agency (IEA) calculates that the world will need to spend $46 trillion between now and 2050 to be sure half of all electricity comes from renewable sources. This includes improving energy efficiency.

=== Clean technologies in Finland ===
Finland's greenhouse gas emissions per capita and energy consumption per capita are both one of the highest in the world. This is particularly due to energy intensive industry (particularly paper and pulp industry), cold climate, and long distances. Finland has no natural oil and gas reserves, and also hydropower capacity is in comparison to neighboring Norway and Sweden. Energy efficiency and energy security issues combined with the Finns' economic dependency on clean nature have forced the Finns to seek for innovative energy and other green technology solutions.

Finland has been a leading innovator across multiple sectors. R&D investments amount to roughly 4 per cent of GDP, positioning Finland as having the third-highest R&D funding of any country in the world as a percentage of GDP. That funding is targeted at cutting edge opportunities, especially in power electronics, clean combustion technologies, and environmental monitoring and utilizing ICT in cleantech.

The total turnover of the Finnish cleantech industry was up to 25.8 billion euros (35.8 billion U.S. dollars) in 2013, after a 15 percent surge in 2012.
