= Joensuu railway station =

Railway station in Joensuu, Finland

Joensuu
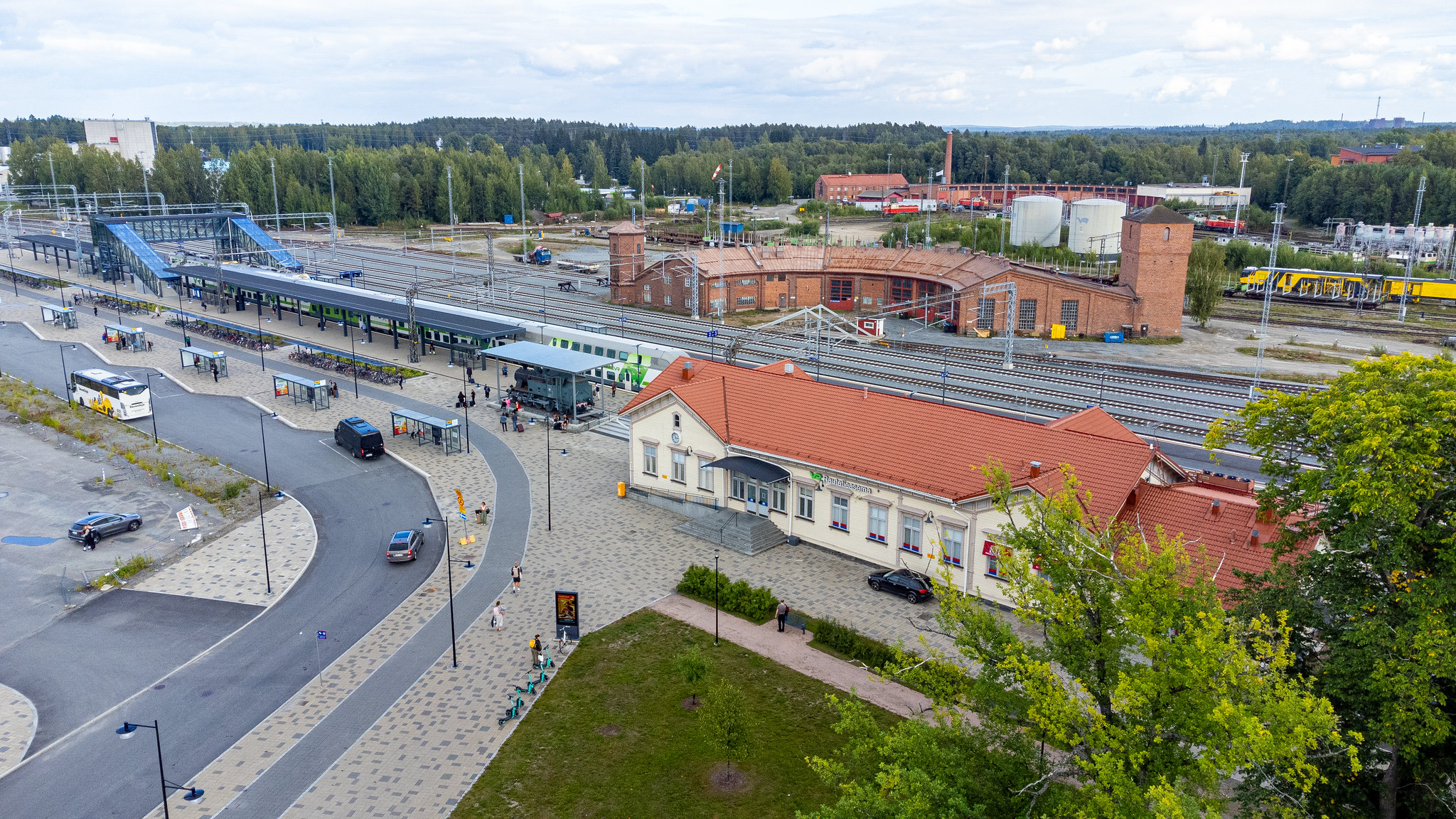
- Joensuu railway station

General information
- Location: Itäranta 12 80100 Joensuu
- Coordinates: 62°36′00″N 029°46′35″E
- System: VR station
- Owner: Finnish Transport Agency

Construction
- Structure type: ground station

History
- Opened: 1894

Services
Preceding station	VR Group	Following station
Niittylahti towards Kouvola	Kouvola–Joensuu	Terminus
Onttola towards Pieksämäki	Pieksämäki–Joensuu	Terminus
Location

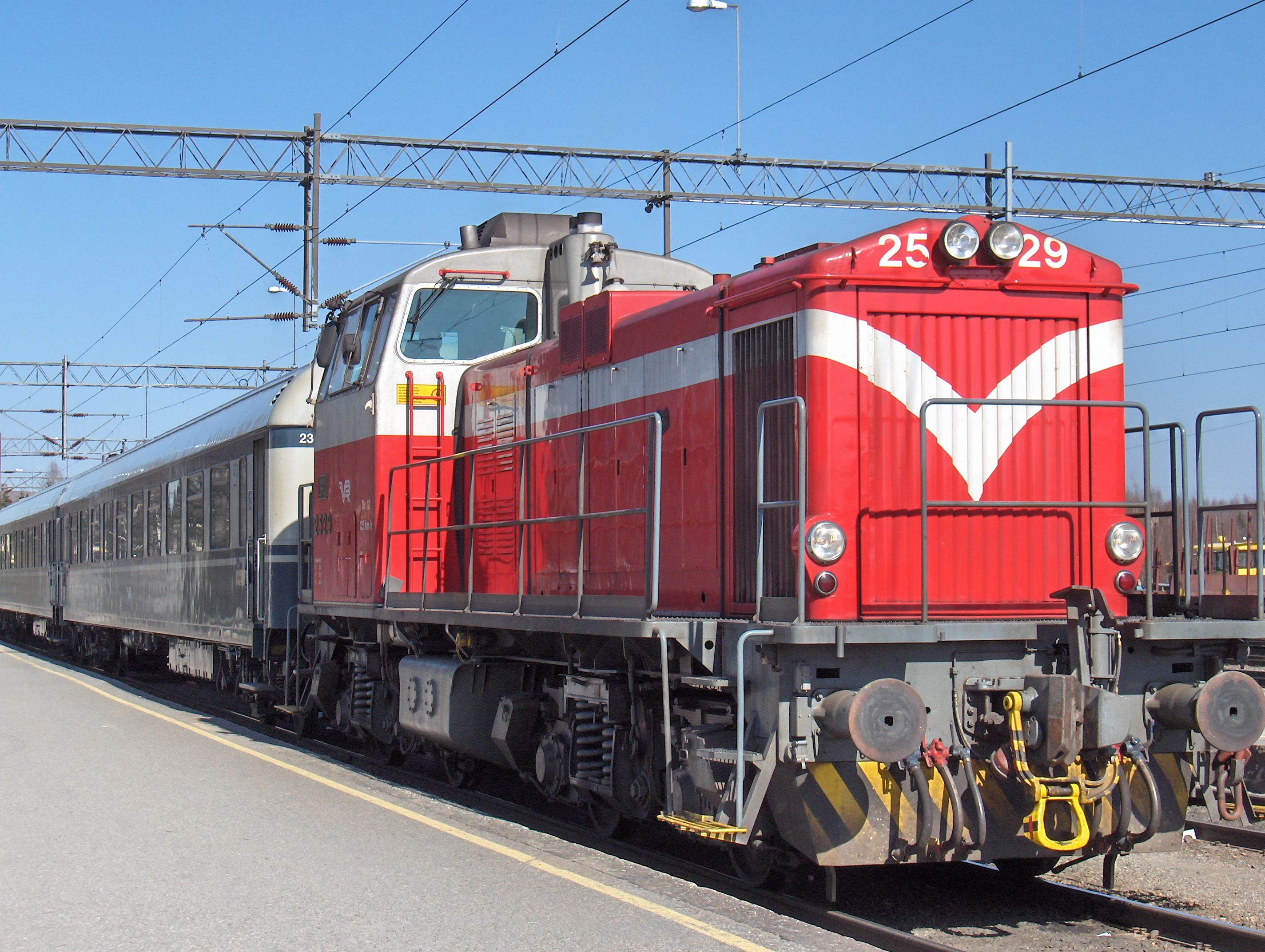
VR class Dv12 diesel locomotive at Joensuu station, having just arrived with a train from Pieksämäki

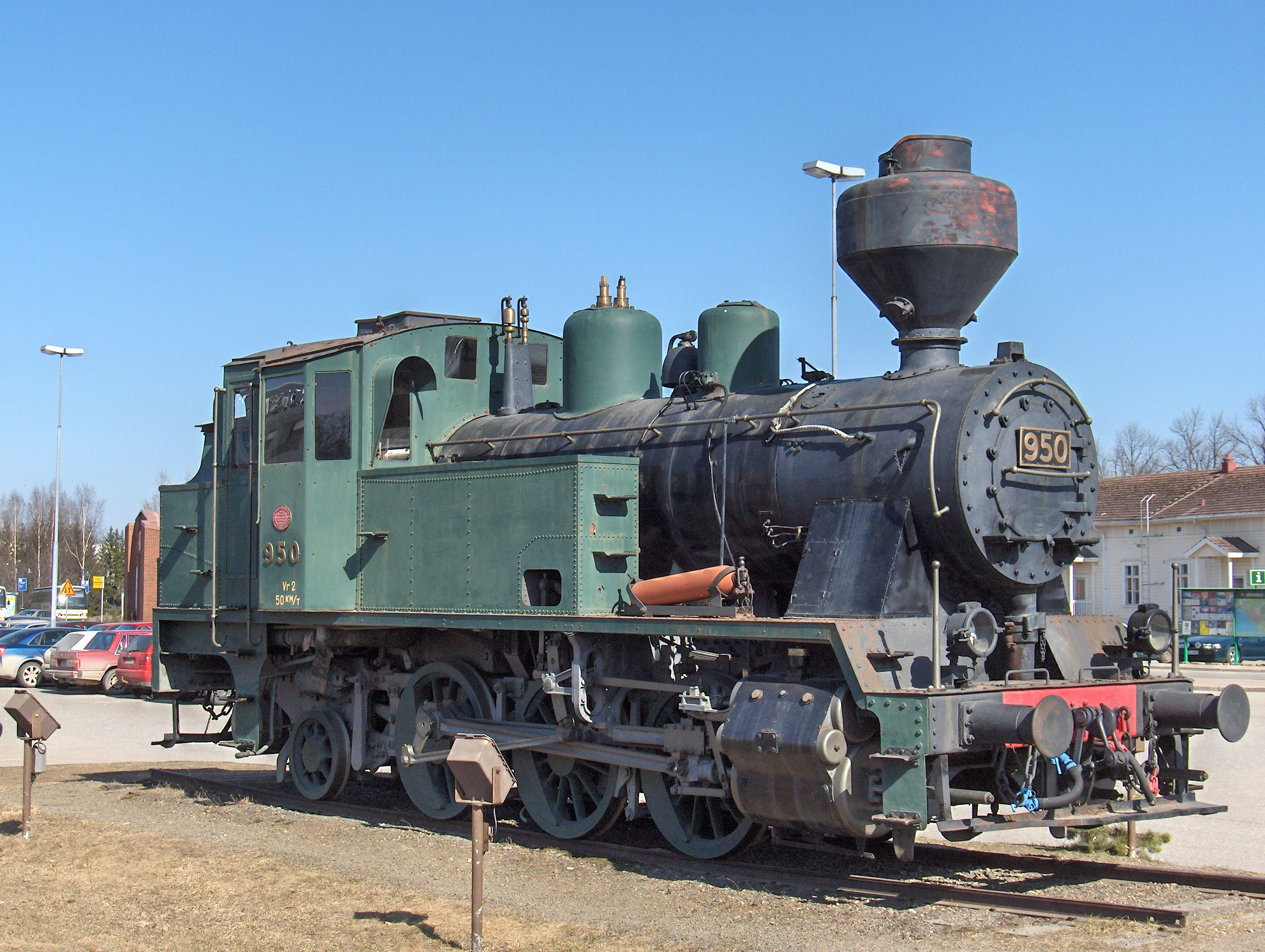
Preserved VR steam locomotive at Joensuu station

Joensuu railway station (in Finnish: Joensuun rautatieasema) is located in Joensuu, North Karelia, Finland. The station was opened in 1894.

The station is served by passenger trains to Helsinki (via Lappeenranta, Kouvola and Lahti), Nurmes and Pieksämäki. The line to Helsinki via Lappeenranta is electrified, all other routes are operated by diesel hauled trains. The passenger train service to Nurmes was originally to close in 2016, but as of 2019 is still in service.

Passenger trains to Helsinki are mainly operated by InterCity carriages or Pendolino units.

== Departure tracks ==
Joensuu railway station has three platform tracks. Track 2 is currently unused by passenger trains.

- Track 1 is used by long-distance trains to Helsinki.
- Track 3 is used by railbus services both to Pieksämäki and to Nurmes.

== See also ==
- VR (Finnish Railways)
- Joensuu Airport
