= Kannelmäki railway station =

Railway station in Helsinki, Finland

Kannelmäki Gamlas
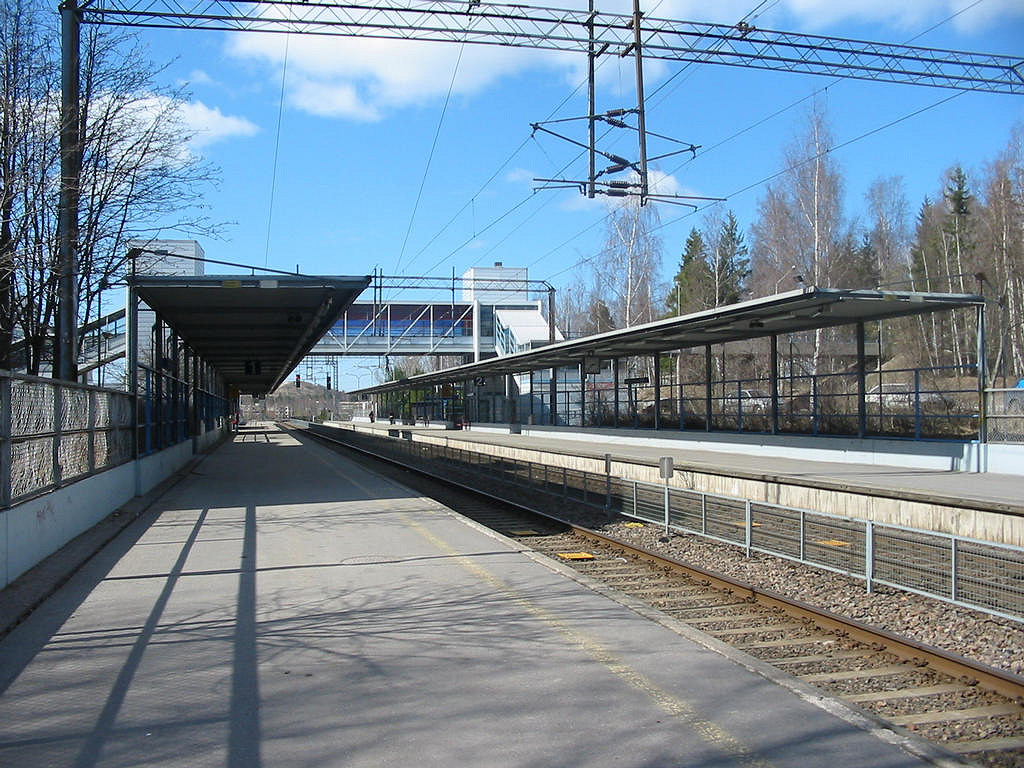

General information
- Location: Sitratori 1, 00420 Helsinki
- Coordinates: 60°14′23″N 024°52′35″E
- System: Helsinki commuter rail station
- Owner: Finnish Transport Agency
- Operator: VR Group
- Line: I P
- Platforms: 2
- Tracks: 2
- Connections: Bus lines 36, 40, 42, 52, 56

Construction
- Structure type: ground station
- Accessible: 4

Other information
- Fare zone: B

History
- Opened: 1975

Passengers
- 2019: 2,599,597

Services
Preceding station	Helsinki commuter rail	Following station
Malminkartano One-way operation	I counterclockwise via Tikkurila	Pohjois-Haaga towards Helsinki
Pohjois-Haaga One-way operation	P clockwise via Myyrmäki	Malminkartano towards Helsinki via Airport
Location

Kannelmäki railway station (Finnish: Kannelmäen rautatieasema, Swedish: Gamlas järnvägsstation) is a railway station on the Helsinki commuter rail network located in northern Helsinki, Finland. It is located approximately nine kilometres to the north/northwest of Helsinki Central railway station.

The station is located in the district of Kannelmäki, between the stations of Pohjois-Haaga and Malminkartano, serving the I/P commuter line between Central Helsinki and Vantaankoski.

The station has two platforms, one for southbound and one for northbound trains. There are four lifts available and several local bus connections are available near the station.

In October 2008 the platforms were fitted with information screens.

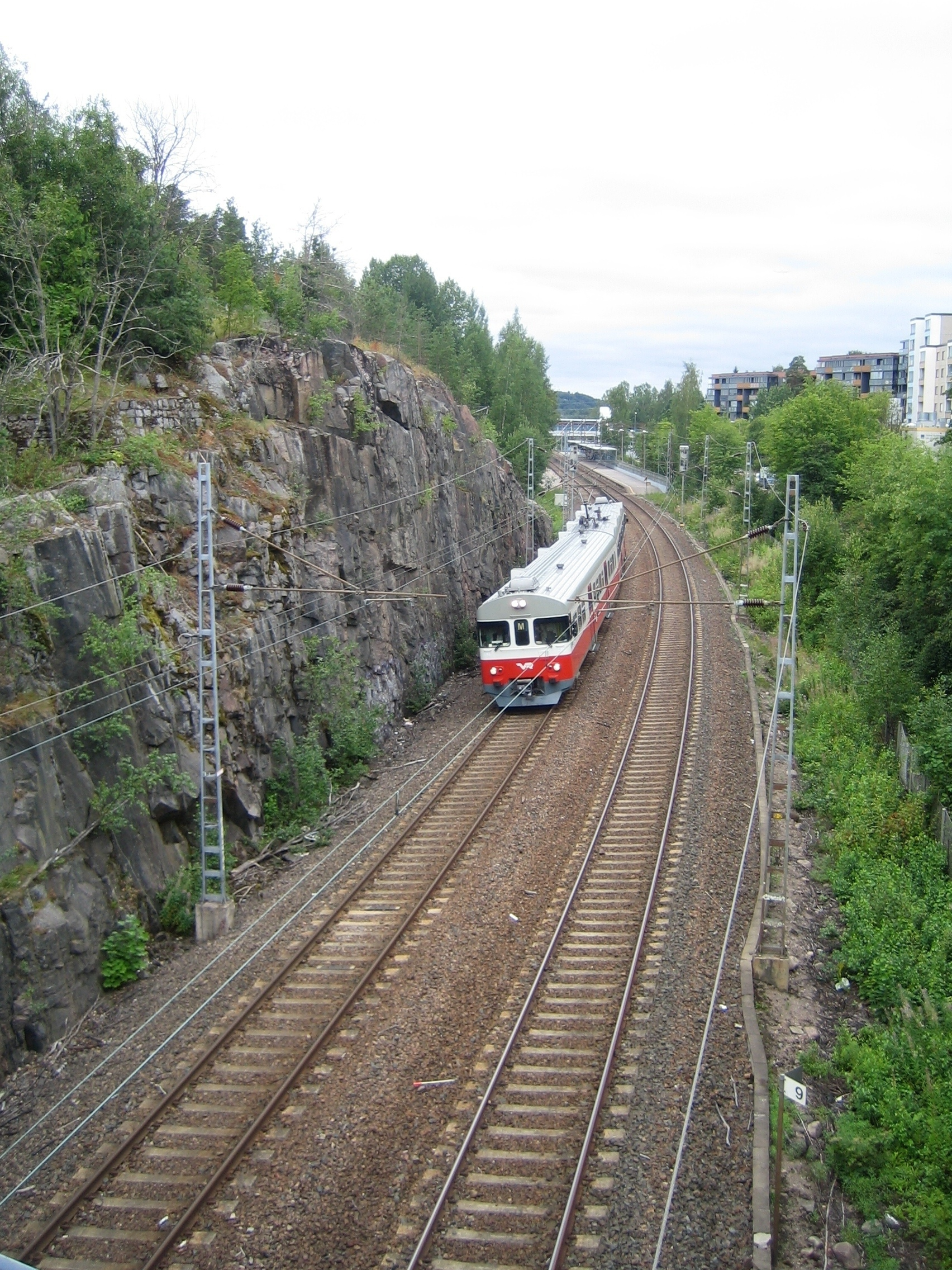
View towards Kannelmäki rail station from a bridge

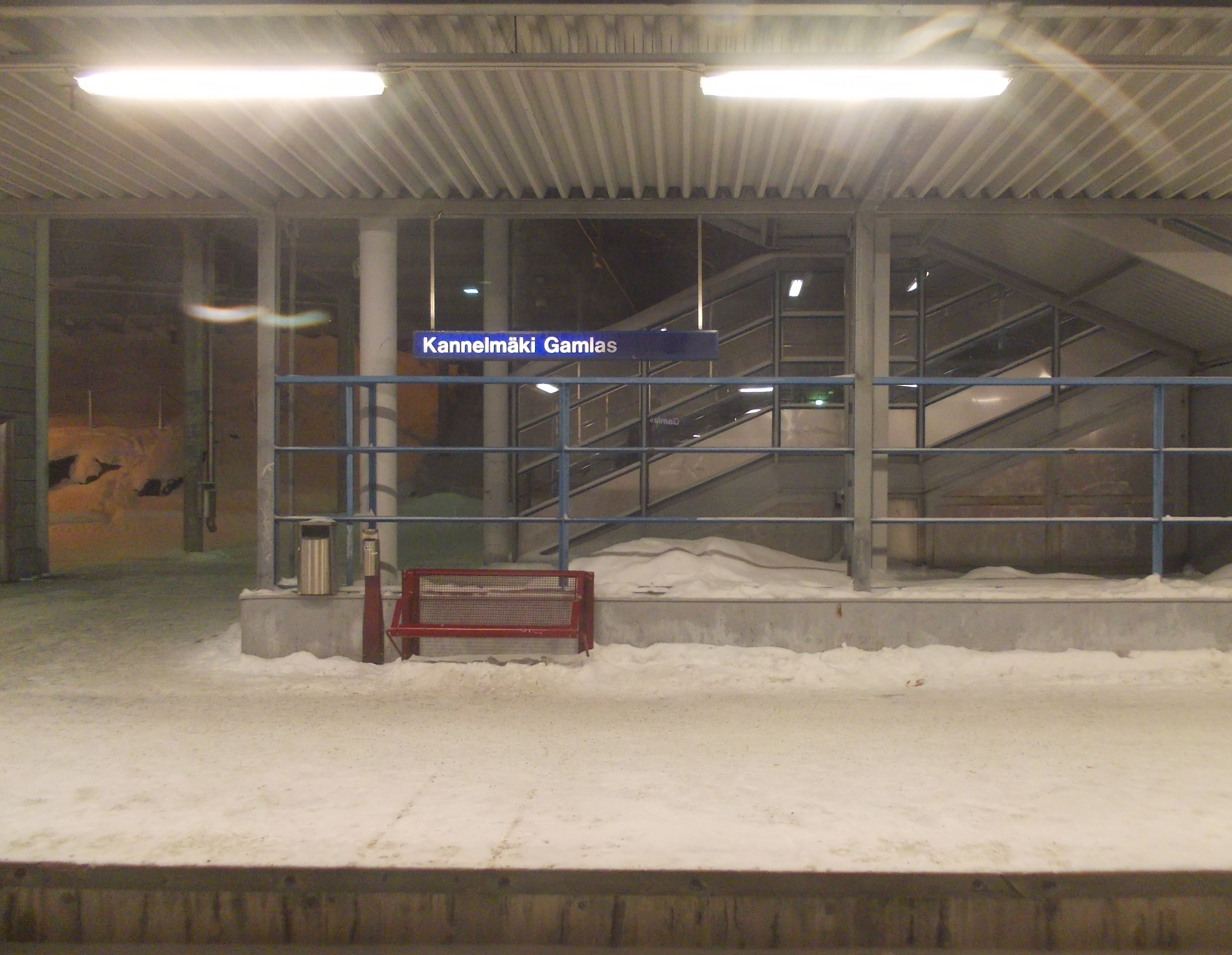
Station platform and sign
