= Martinlaakso =

Martinlaakso Mårtensdal
- City District
- September 2021

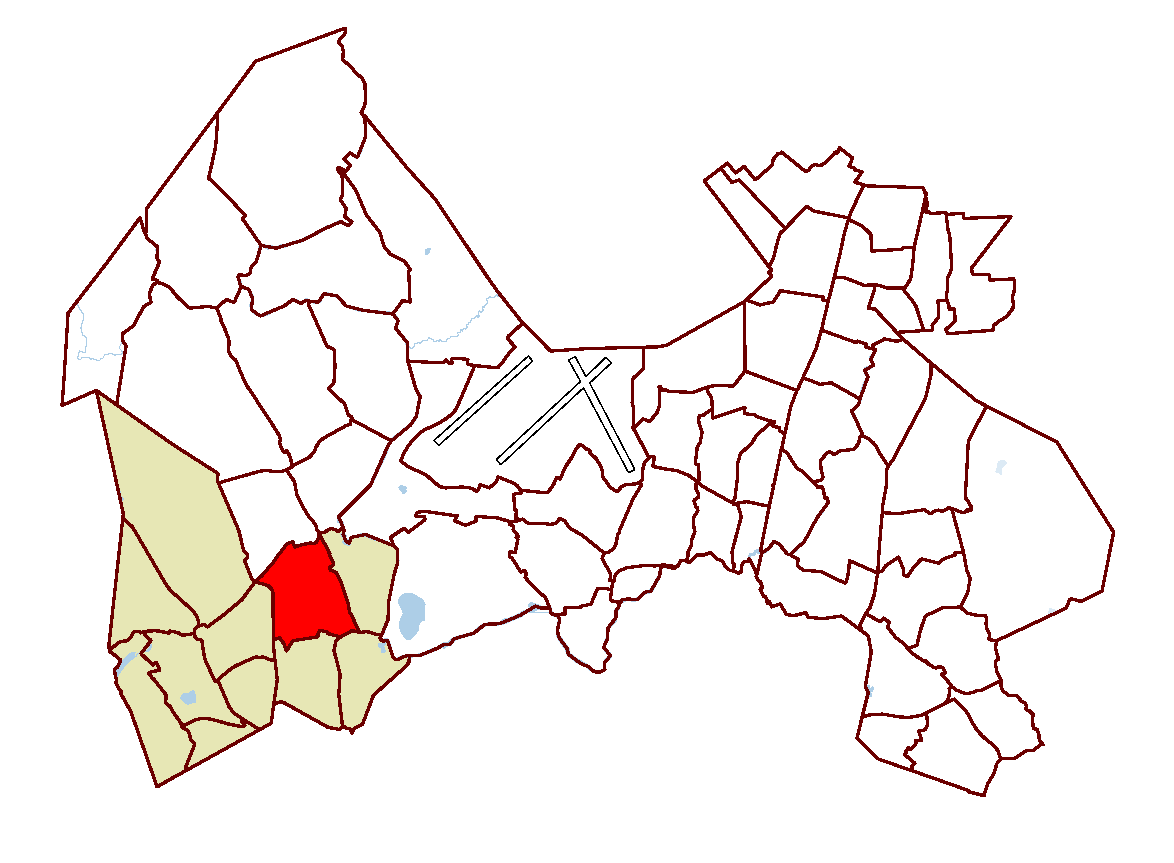
- Location on the map of Vantaa, with the district in red and the Myyrmäki major region in light brown
- Coordinates: 60°17′00″N 24°51′00″E
- Country: Finland
- City: Vantaa
- Major region: Myyrmäki

Area
  - Total: 3.7 km^{2} (1.4 sq mi)

Population (31.12.2024)
  - Total: 14,222
  - Density: 3,800/km^{2} (10,000/sq mi)
- Time zone: GMT +2
- Postal Code(s): 01620
- Website: www.vantaa.fi/frontpage/

Martinlaakso (Swedish: Mårtensdal) is a district in Vantaa, Finland. Located in the Myyrmäki major region, it is the second most populous district in all of Vantaa, after Myyrmäki itself. At the end of 2024 Martinlaakso had a population of 14,222, beating out Hakunila.

Martinlaakso has two railway stations, Martinlaakso railway station and Vantaankoski railway station, as well as a medical center, several shopping areas, and a comprehensive school (lower level [6 years] and upper level [three years]) and an upper secondary school. It is the birthplace of former Formula One drivers Mika Häkkinen and Mika Salo. Former Formula One star Kimi Räikkönen also spent a part of his childhood in Martinlaakso.

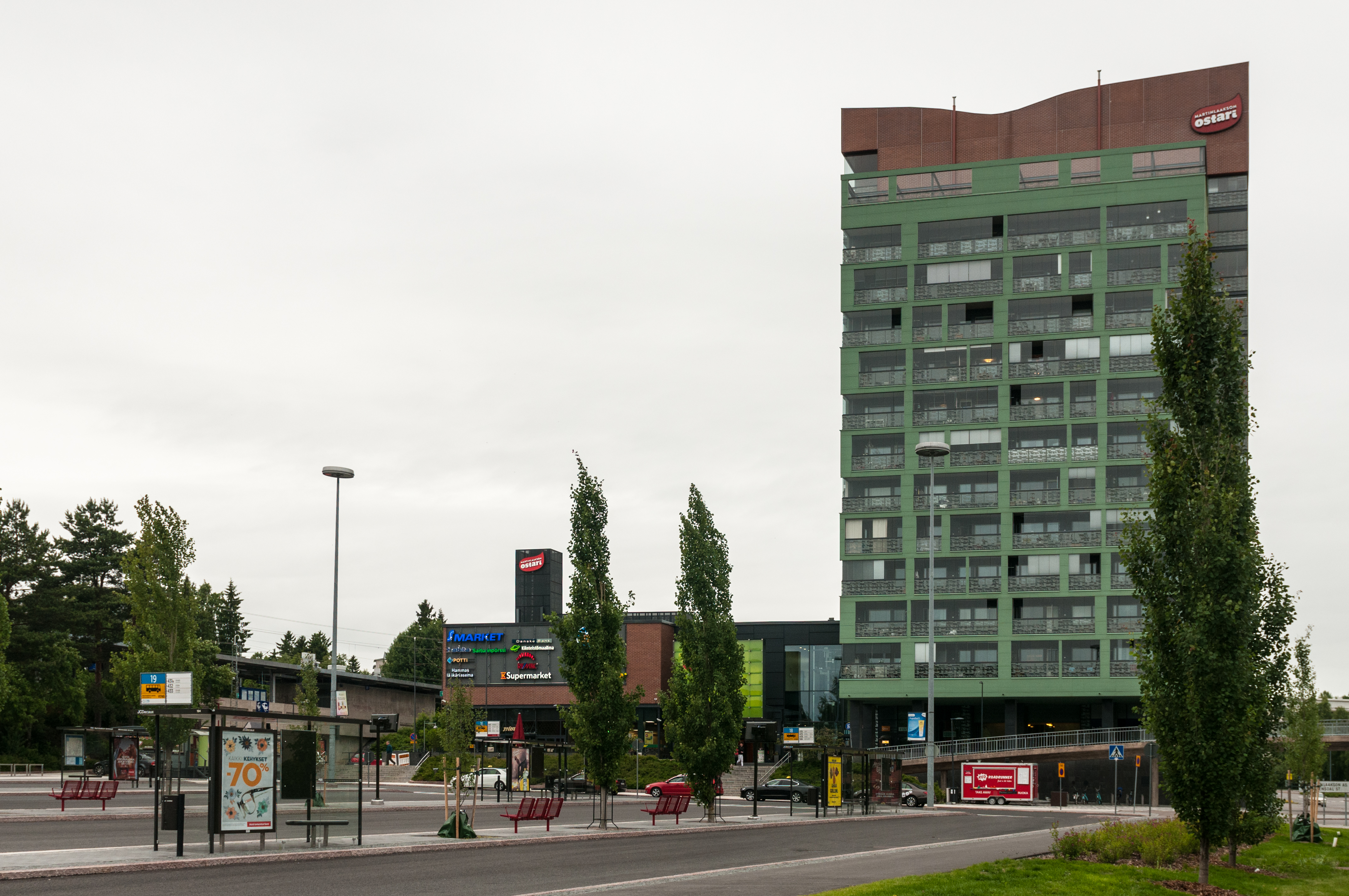
Martinlaakson Ostari, the newer shopping mall in Martinlaakso.

Martinlaakso was the home for Martinkeskus, which was the largest shopping center in the Nordic countries at the time of its completion in 1960s. Another shopping center in the area is Martinlaakson Ostari, which was completed in 2011.

Martinlaakso power plant, the only power plant in Vantaa.

Some pictures of Martinlaakso.

== History ==
Martinlaakso is situated on the grounds of the former town of Martinkylä, which had existed with a stable population since the 16th century. The name, which was originally only the Swedish Mårtensby, derives from the name Mårten (Martti), who was likely a notable inhabitant or founder of the town. Settlements in the nearby Espoo and Sipoo also shared the name Mårtensby, so to avoid confusion, the Vantaa settlement was renamed Mårtensdal (Martinlaakso), and the Espoo settlement was renamed Mårtensbro (Martinsilta). The settlement in Sipoo retained its name.

In 1975, the extension of the Helsinki commuter rail to western Vantaa was completed, and with it, the Martinlaakso railway station opened. In 1991, the Vantaankoski railway station was also opened in the district, making Martinlaakso the only district in Greater Helsinki with two railway stations. Starting July 2015, the Ring Rail Line runs through Martinlaakso. It connects the district to Helsinki Airport and Tikkurila. There is also a high school in Martinlaakso, named Martinlaakson lukio. The school hosts about 450 students in total and has a focus on the natural sciences and geography, as well as drama and theater.

== Economy ==
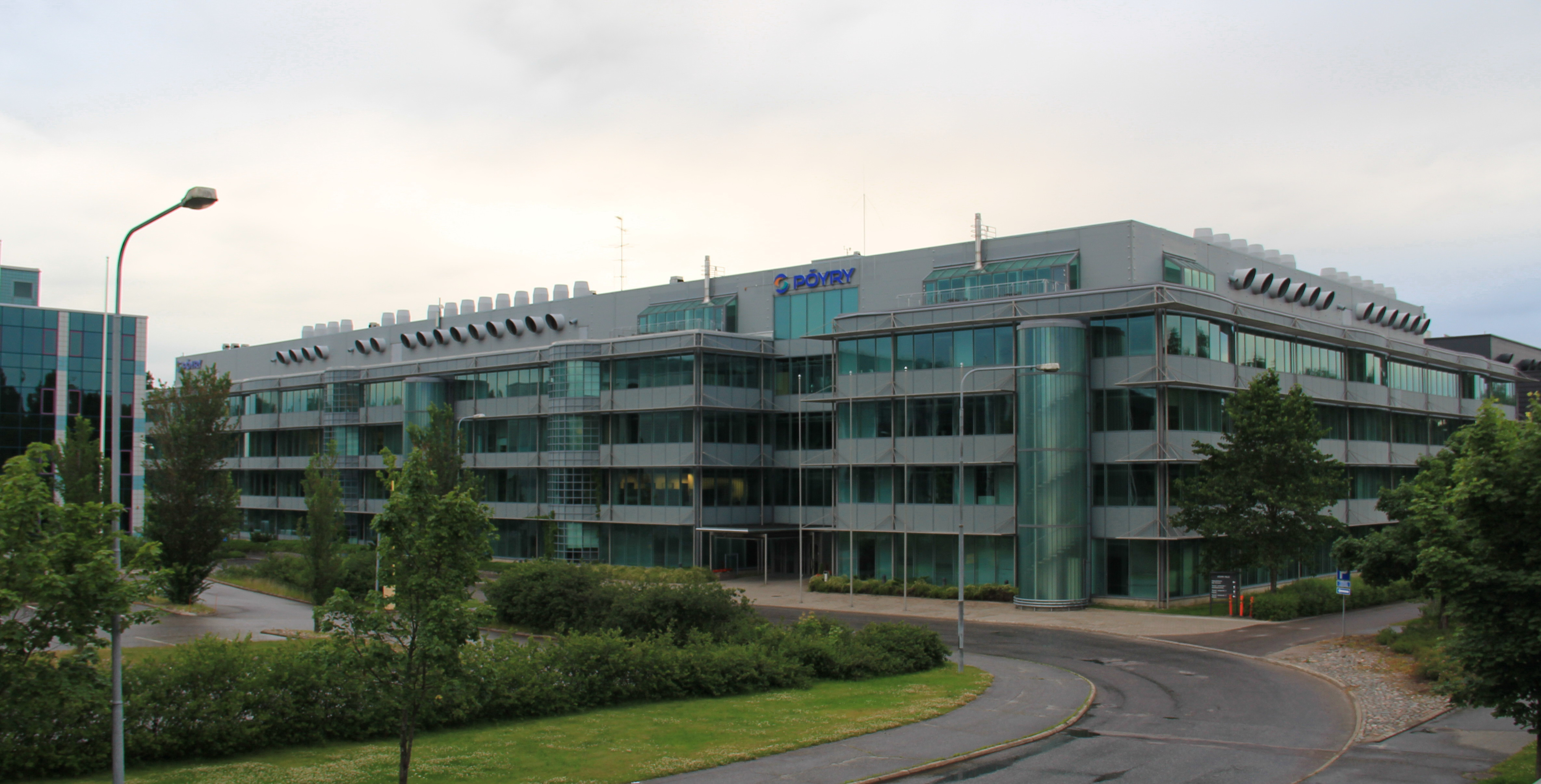
The headquarters of Pöyry

The area around the Vantaankoski railway station acts as business park land, with several companies' headquarters situated there. These include the Pöyry consultation firm and the Murata Electronics (formerly VTI Technologies) microelectromechanical engineering firm.

Also in the area is the offset printing plant Sanomala, which prints the largest subscription newspaper in the Nordic countries, Helsingin Sanomat, as well as Finland's most popular Swedish language newspaper, Hufvudstadsbladet.

Martinlaakso has a shopping center, Martinlaakson Ostari.

== Notable people ==
Two Formula One drivers, Mika Häkkinen and Mika Salo, were born in Martinlaakso. In addition, current Formula One star Kimi Räikkönen spent a part of his childhood in the district. Other notable people from Martinlaakso include Vicky Rosti, Jorma Hynninen, and the schlager singer Annikki Tähti. Also one of the biggest metal band in the world Amorphis started their journey to the world maps from martinlaakso.
