= Pohjois-Haaga railway station =

Railway station in Helsinki, Finland

Pohjois-Haaga Norra Haga
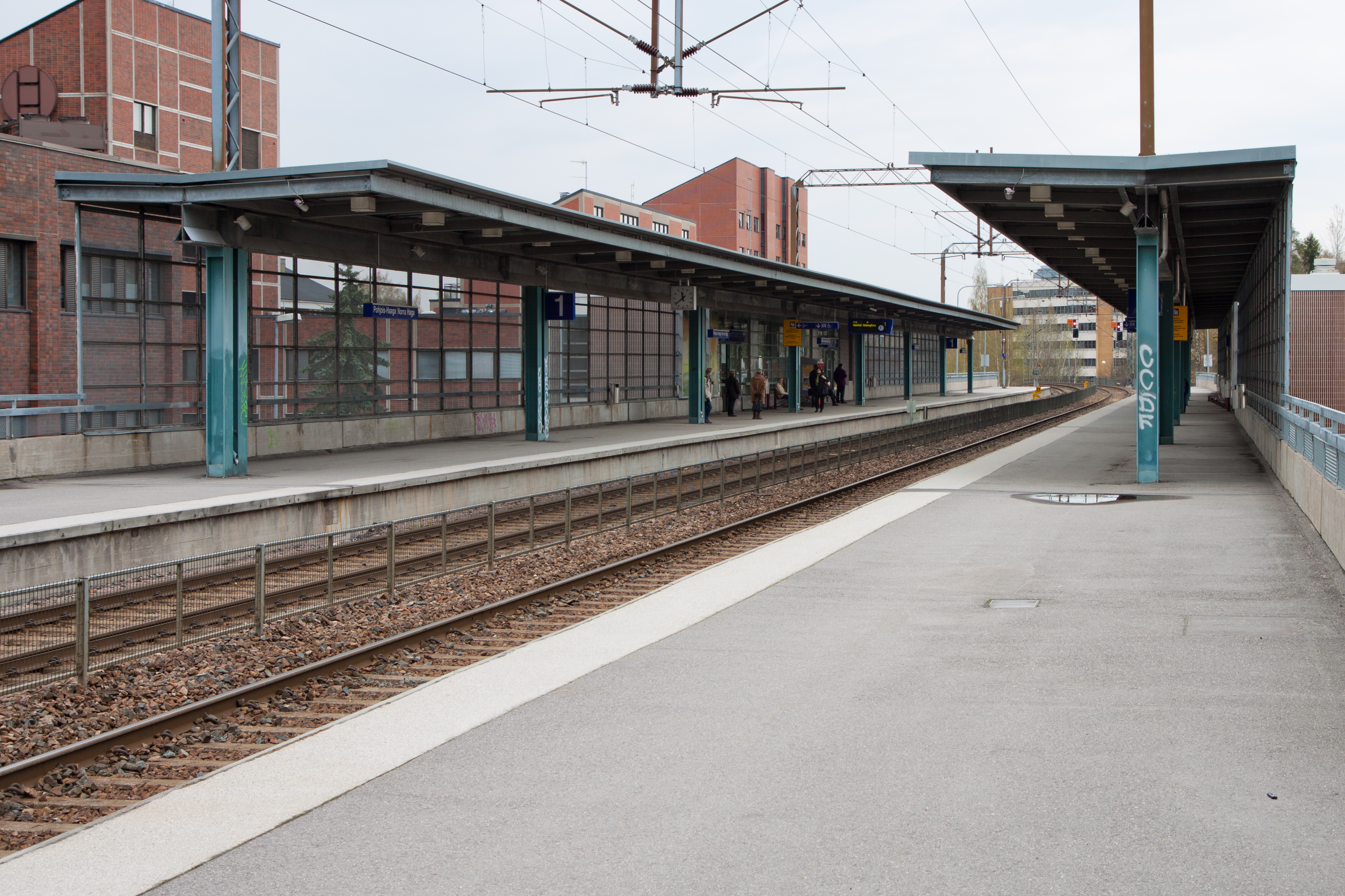

General information
- Location: Hopeatie 2, 00440; Lassila, Helsinki; Finland
- Coordinates: 60°13′49″N 24°53′00″E
- System: Helsinki commuter rail station
- Owner: Finnish Transport Agency
- Line: Ring Rail Line
- Platforms: 2 side platforms
- Tracks: 2
- Connections: Helsinki buses 31, 32, 40, 51, 54, 553K

Construction
- Structure type: Elevated station
- Accessible: 4

Other information
- Station code: Poh
- Fare zone: B
- Classification: Halt

History
- Opened: 1 June 1975

Passengers
- 2019: 1,709,885

Services
Preceding station	Helsinki commuter rail	Following station
Kannelmäki One-way operation	I counterclockwise via Tikkurila	Huopalahti towards Helsinki
Huopalahti One-way operation	P clockwise via Myyrmäki	Kannelmäki towards Helsinki via Airport
Location

Pohjois-Haaga railway station (Finnish: Pohjois-Haagan rautatieasema, Swedish: Norra Haga järnvägsstation) is a railway station on the Helsinki commuter rail network located in northern Helsinki, Finland. It is located about eight kilometres to the north/northwest of Helsinki Central railway station.

The Pohjois-Haaga station is located in the district of Lassila, between the stations of Huopalahti and Kannelmäki. It is the first station after the split between the Vantaankoski track and the rantarata track towards Turku.

Near the station, from underneath the track on the bridge, is a light traffic route, which can be used to follow the train tracks all the way to the city centre. On the other hand, the tracks cannot be followed to the north towards Kannelmäki, because after Pohjois-Haaga, the tracks continue on a narrow bridge. Sometimes, pedestrians use the bridge anyway to get to the other side of Kehä I. This has caused dangerous situations.

The Helsinki City Transport takes responsibility of the station.

== History ==
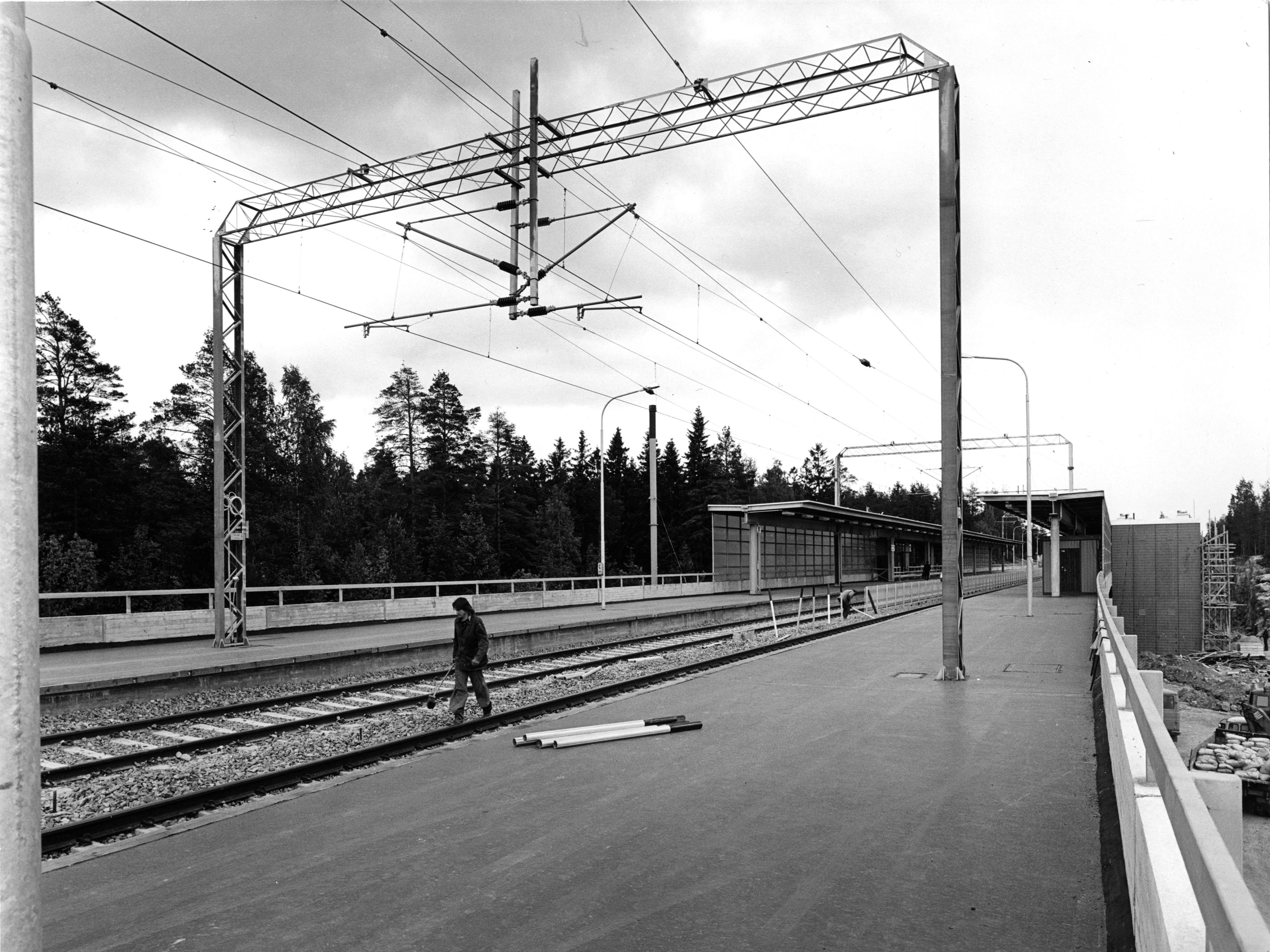
Pohjois-Haaga under construction in 1974

During the planning phases of the Helsinki Metro in the 1960s, it was planned to build a line to the east of what became the Martinlaakso line; a station was planned to be placed in the very center of the district of Pohjois-Haaga. However, as the decision to replace this metro line with a local traffic railway under the ownership of the Finnish State Railways was made, the station was instead built in a sparsely populated area between Lassila and Pohjois-Haaga. Construction of housing and offices around the station took off only after the line was opened for traffic, in June 1975.

As with numerous other stations only serving local traffic, ticket sales at Pohjois-Haaga were ceased in June 2004.

== Architecture ==
The Pohjois-Haaga station building was funded by and came to be owned by the city of Helsinki, and was completed in October 1975, four months after the line itself; until then, the ticket office operated in a temporary building. The station building, is made of rebar and brick with a facade of ceramic tile, and the final ticket office was situated on the ground level, from where passengers ascend to the side platforms via a stairwell. The platform shelters are made from steel profiles. The building has a total area of 942 square metres (10,140 sq ft), and was designed by architectural firm Arkkitehtitoimisto Lehtovuori–Tegelman–Väänänen.

== Services ==
Pohjois-Haaga is served by circular lines P and I on the HSL commuter rail network. P trains towards the Helsinki Airport use track 1, while I trains bound for Helsinki via Huopalahti use track 2. The station has a HSL ticket vending machine, as well as elevators and 55 centimetres (22 in) high platforms for accessibility.

Exchanging onto HSL buses is possible at the Pohjois-Haagan asema terminus on the eastern side of the railway on the Hopeatie street; additionally, several bus lines use the Lassila stops on its western side on the Kaupintie street. On the western side is also a city bike terminal, and park and ride is provided in a parking lot under the northern side of the platforms. The Pohjois-Haaga station and its surrounding bus stops belong to HSL fare zone B.
