= Sanomala =

Printer in Vantaa, Finland

Coordinates: 60°17′13″N 24°51′18″E

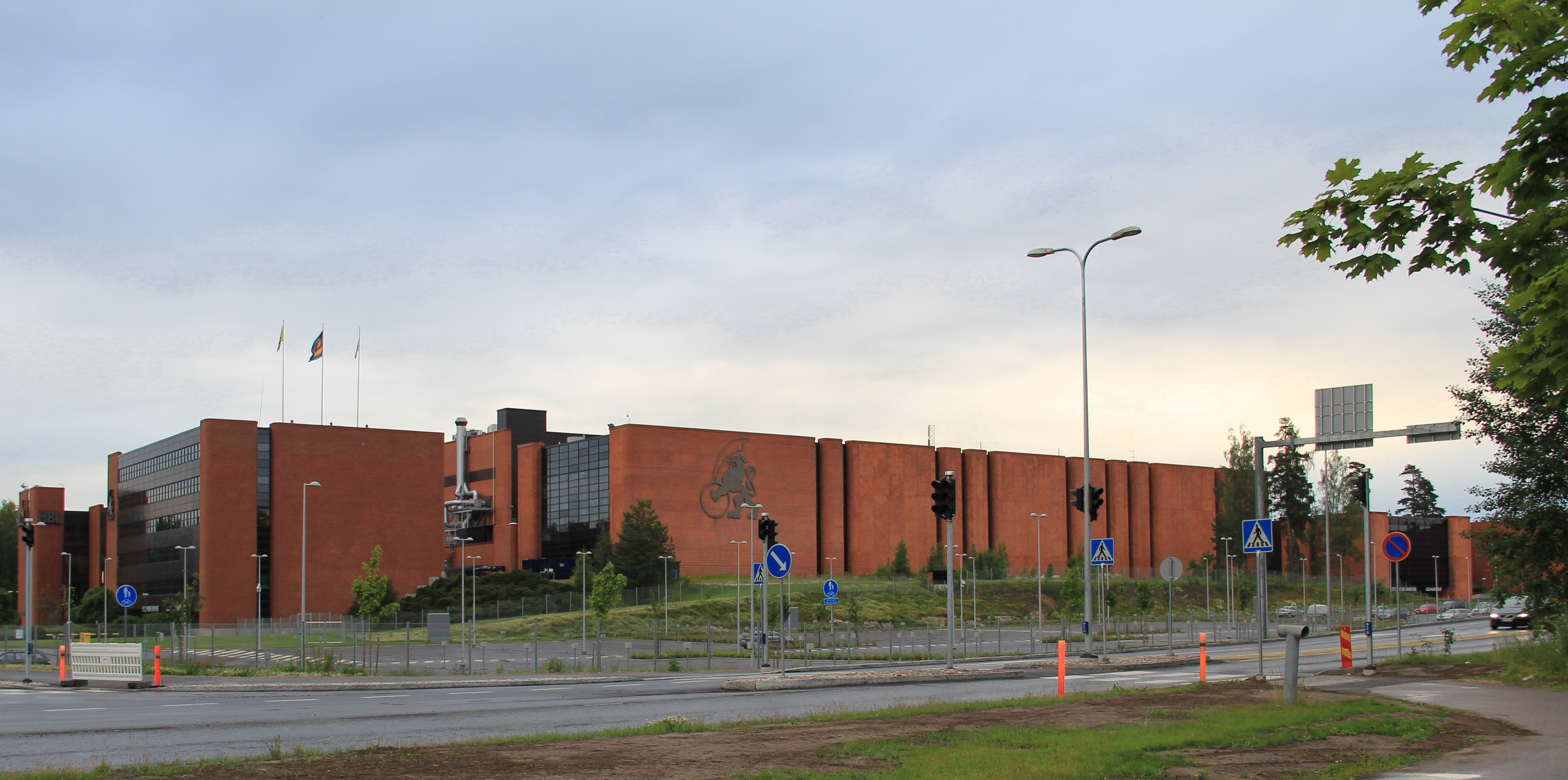
Sanomala seen from Martinkyläntie.

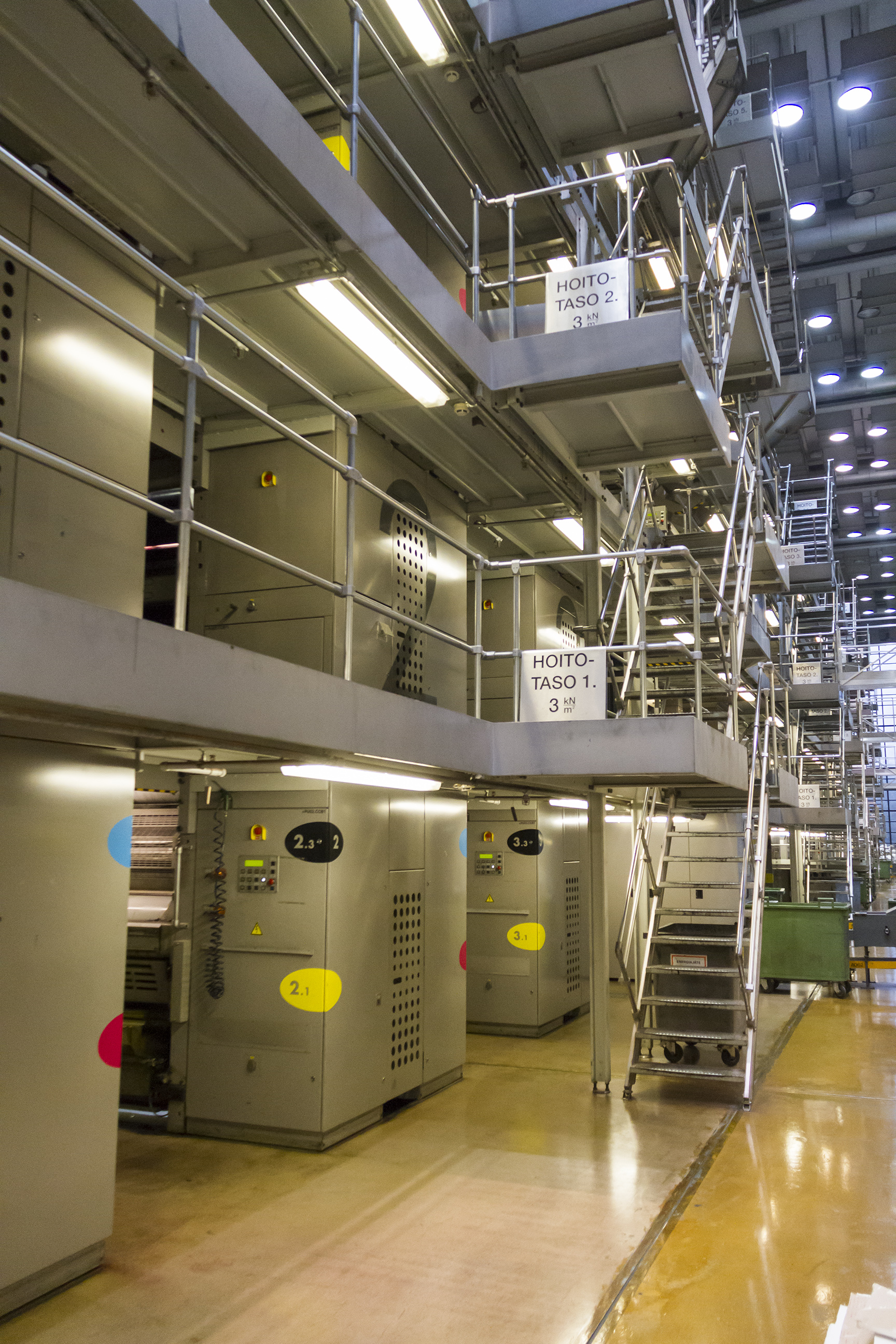
The second and third printing units of the Sanoman printing machines.

Sanomala is a printing press of the Sanoma newspaper company located in the district of Martinlaakso in Vantaa, Finland. The press is used to print Helsingin Sanomat, Ilta-Sanomat, Hufvudstadsbladet and other newspapers of the company. Helsingin Sanomat alone forms over two thirds of the total printing volume. The press also prints minute amounts of newspapers from different companies. The surface area of the Sanomala press is 5.4 hectares. As well as the Sanoma newspaper company, the building also hosts premises for other companies in the graphics industry.

== Printing of Helsingin Sanomat ==
The press prints three editions of Helsingin Sanomat every day, of which the first is delivered to most parts of Finland. Its printing begins at about nine o'clock in the evening. The second edition is delivered to Uusimaa and the third to Helsinki alone. If the newspaper receives last-minute changes late in the evening, such as parliamentary election results, there might be more than three editions.

The printing machines at the press can print up to 50 or 60 thousand newspaper copies per hour. The technical maximum for the machines is 86 thousand copies per hour, but this is too fast for the packing personnel. In May 2019 the press printed about 170 to 230 thousand newspaper copies per day. The all-time maximum for the press so far has been over half a million copies per day.

== Building ==
Construction of the Sanomala printing press started in 1976 and it was completed in 1977. The building was designed by architect Kalle Vartola. The building is significant in cultural history and its red-brick facade towards Martinkyläntie is protected under the Vantaa modern industrial heritage inventory from 2012.

== Technology ==
Before the construction of the Sanomala press, Helsingin Sanomat was printed at Ludviginkatu in Helsinki in a letterpress printing press. Construction of the Sanomala press enabled moving to a offset printing press. The first issues of Helsingin Sanomat were printed in Sanomala on 16 November 1977. By 2003 Goss Metro printing machines produced by the Rockwell company were taken into use. These constituted seven printing machines with a total of 52 printing units.

In 2003 new Man Roland "Sanoman" printing machines were taken into use in Sanomala. The Man Roland printing machines constitute two printing machines with six printing units each. The machines use coldset offset printing like their predecessors. The new printing machines allow the entire newspaper to be printed in four-colour whereas the earlier machines had to print part of the newspaper in black and white because of technical limitations. With the satellite printing units all four colours are printed onto paper on a strip about a metre in length. The previous machines used three-colour units to print the four-colour prints: the paper travelled a long way between the first and last colours, which made it difficult to align the colours properly.
