= Martinlaakso railway station =

Railway station in Vantaa, Finland

Martinlaakso Mårtensdal
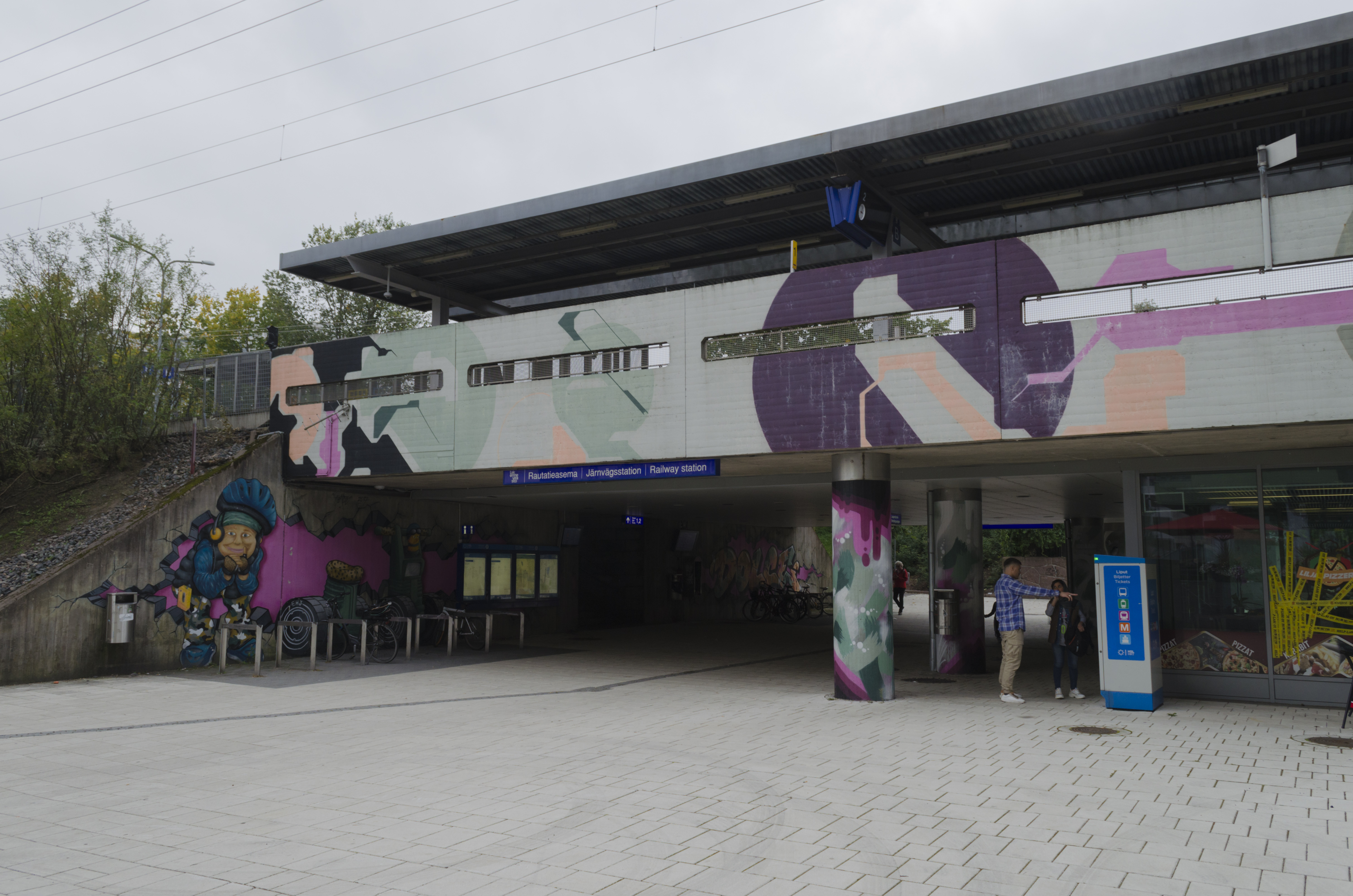

General information
- Location: Kivivuorentie 4 Vantaa, Uusimaa; Finland
- Coordinates: 60°16′40″N 024°51′09″E
- System: Helsinki commuter rail station
- Owner: City of Vantaa
- Platforms: 1 island platform
- Tracks: 2
- Train operators: VR on behalf of HSL
- Connections: 335/B, 400, 413, 415N, 433, 436N, 520, 566, 571, 572, 574, 583/K, 584/T

Construction
- Structure type: ground station

Other information
- Station code: Mrl
- Fare zone: B

History
- Opened: 1 June 1975

Passengers
- 2019: 2,147,938

Services
Preceding station	Helsinki commuter rail	Following station
Vantaankoski One-way operation	I counterclockwise via Tikkurila	Louhela towards Helsinki
Louhela One-way operation	P clockwise via Myyrmäki	Vantaankoski towards Helsinki via Airport
Location

Martinlaakso railway station (Finnish: Martinlaakson rautatieasema; Swedish: Mårtensdals järnvägsstation) is a Helsinki commuter rail station located in Vantaa, Finland. It is approximately 14 kilometres (8.7 mi) north of Helsinki Central railway station.

The station is served by circular lines I and P, and is between the stations of Louhela and Vantaankoski.

There is an island platform; one side for northbound and another side for southbound trains. There is one lift and a waiting room, although it is not possible to buy tickets from the station. The local bus station is situated nearby.

Prior to the construction of the station at Vantaankoski in 1991, Martinlaakso was the northern terminus for the M line (hence the name of the line).

A shopping center was built next to the station in 2011.
