= Louhela railway station =

Railway station in Vantaa, Finland

Louhela Klippsta
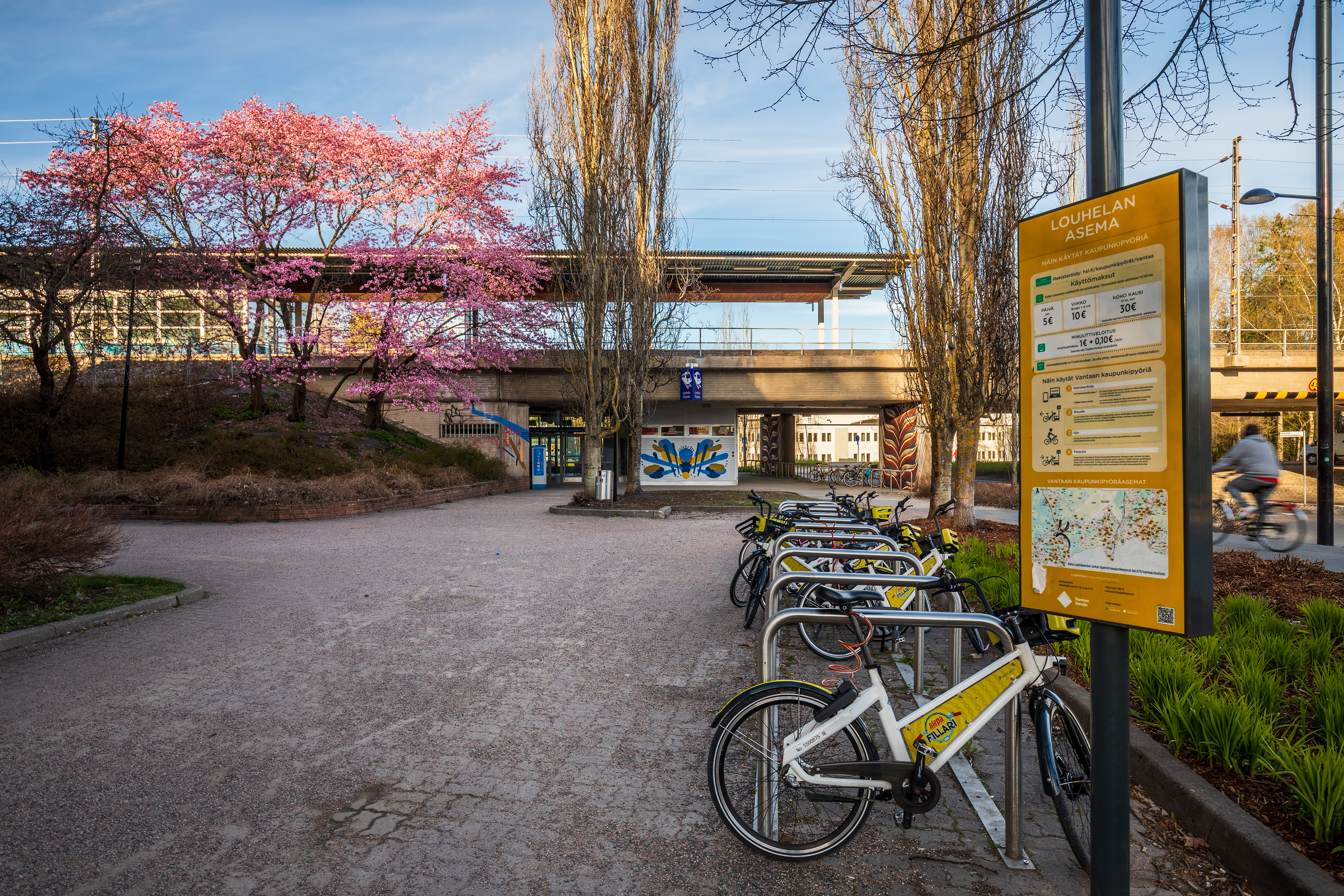

General information
- Location: Patotie 1, 01600; Myyrmäki, Vantaa, Uusimaa; Finland
- Coordinates: 60°16′14″N 024°51′12″E
- System: Helsinki commuter rail station
- Owner: City of Vantaa
- Line: Ring Rail Line
- Platforms: 1 island platform
- Tracks: 2
- Train operators: VR on behalf of HSL
- Connections: Helsinki buses

Construction
- Structure type: ground station

Other information
- Station code: Loh
- Fare zone: B
- Classification: Halt

History
- Opened: 1 June 1975

Passengers
- 2019: 1,207,610

Services
Preceding station	Helsinki commuter rail	Following station
Martinlaakso One-way operation	I counterclockwise via Tikkurila	Myyrmäki towards Helsinki
Myyrmäki One-way operation	P clockwise via Myyrmäki	Martinlaakso towards Helsinki via Airport
Location

Louhela railway station (Finnish: Louhelan rautatieasema, Swedish: Klippsta järnvägsstation) is a VR commuter rail station located in Vantaa, Finland. It is approximately thirteen kilometres north of Helsinki Central railway station.

The station is served by circular lines I and P, and is between the stations of Myyrmäki and Martinlaakso.

There are two platforms serving both north and southbound trains, one lift and a waiting room. Many local bus connections are available nearby.

== History ==
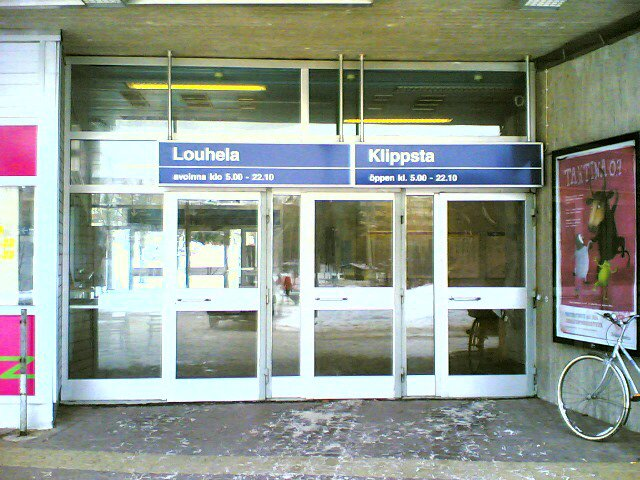
Entry for the station

The residential area of Louhela, built in Vantaa in the 1960s (then still known as Helsingin maalaiskunta), was designed to revolve around a metro station, placed in the intersection of the streets of Louhelantie and Uomatie. As the municipality along with the city of Helsinki took upon the planning of a commuter rail line instead, the idea of a station in Louhela was not originally in the cards as it and the rest of Myyrmäki were meant to be served by a single station by the name of Etelä-Vantaa. The plan was canned as the planned line was moved further east in 1971.

The station building was funded by the city of Vantaa. Its building process was burdened by delays, and despite the original date for the opening of the line being in the autumn of 1974, the Louhela station was finished on 23 April 1975.

The station building's walls were adorned with street art in 2018 as part of a project funded by the city. Eleven artists were assigned to paint their personal interpretation of the poem Jokiyöt, written by poet Vesa Haapala.
