= Malminkartano railway station =

Railway station in Helsinki, Finland

Malminkartano Malmgård
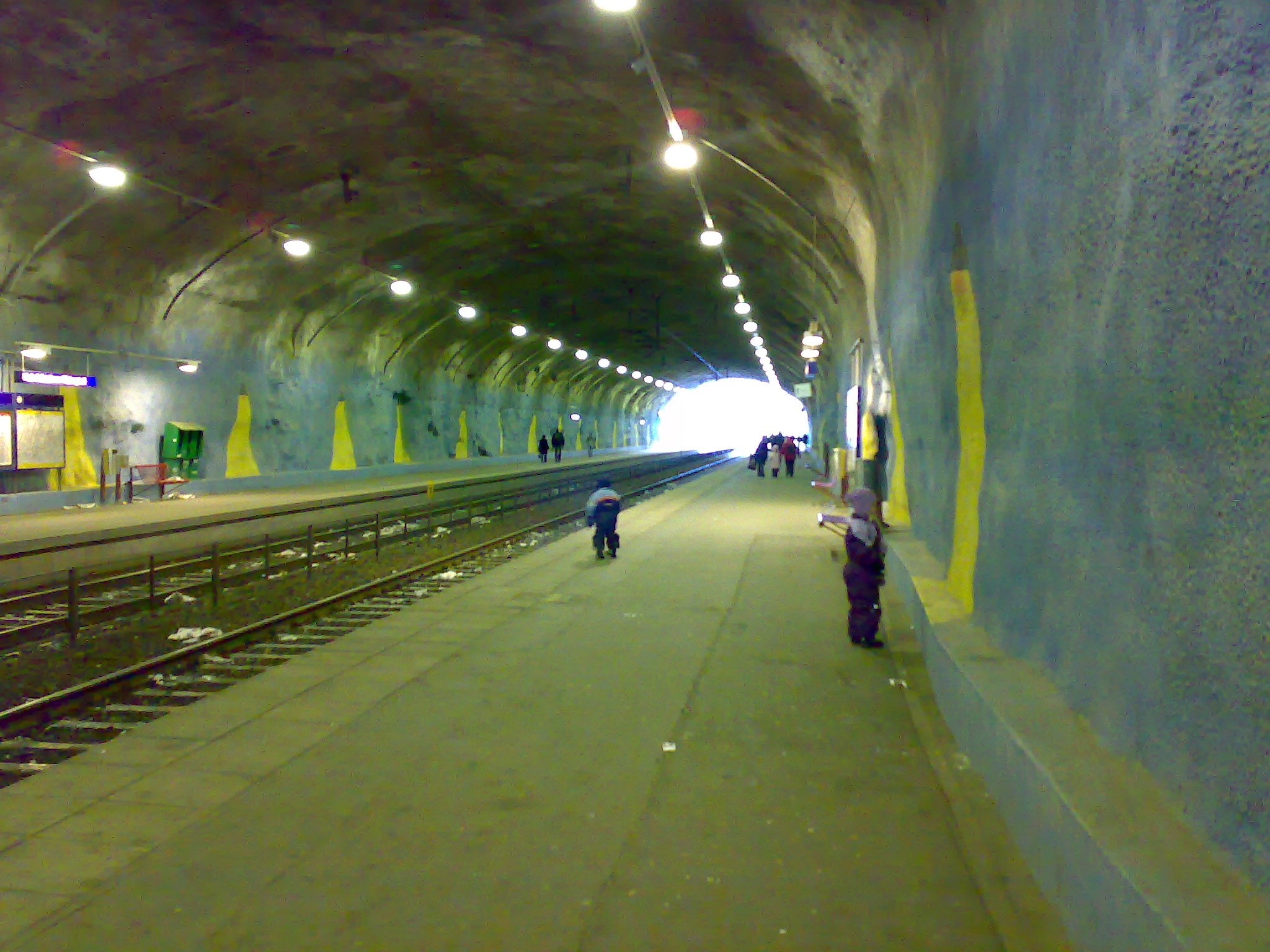

General information
- Location: Luutnantintie, 00410; Malminkartano, Helsinki; Finland
- Coordinates: 60°14′48″N 024°51′50″E
- System: Helsinki commuter rail station
- Owner: City of Helsinki
- Line: Ring Rail Line
- Platforms: 2 side platforms
- Connections: Helsinki buses

Construction
- Structure type: Tunnel station

Other information
- Station code: Mlo
- Fare zone: B
- Classification: Halt

History
- Opened: 28 May 1978

Passengers
- 2019: 2,177,076

Services
Preceding station	Helsinki commuter rail	Following station
Myyrmäki One-way operation	I counterclockwise via Tikkurila	Kannelmäki towards Helsinki
Kannelmäki One-way operation	P clockwise via Myyrmäki	Myyrmäki towards Helsinki via Airport
Location

Malminkartano railway station (Finnish: Malminkartanon rautatieasema, Swedish: Malmgårds järnvägsstation) is a railway station on the Helsinki commuter rail network located in northern Helsinki, Finland. It is located approximately eleven kilometres to the north of Helsinki Central railway station.

The station is served by circular lines I and P, between the stations of Kannelmäki and Myyrmäki.

== History ==
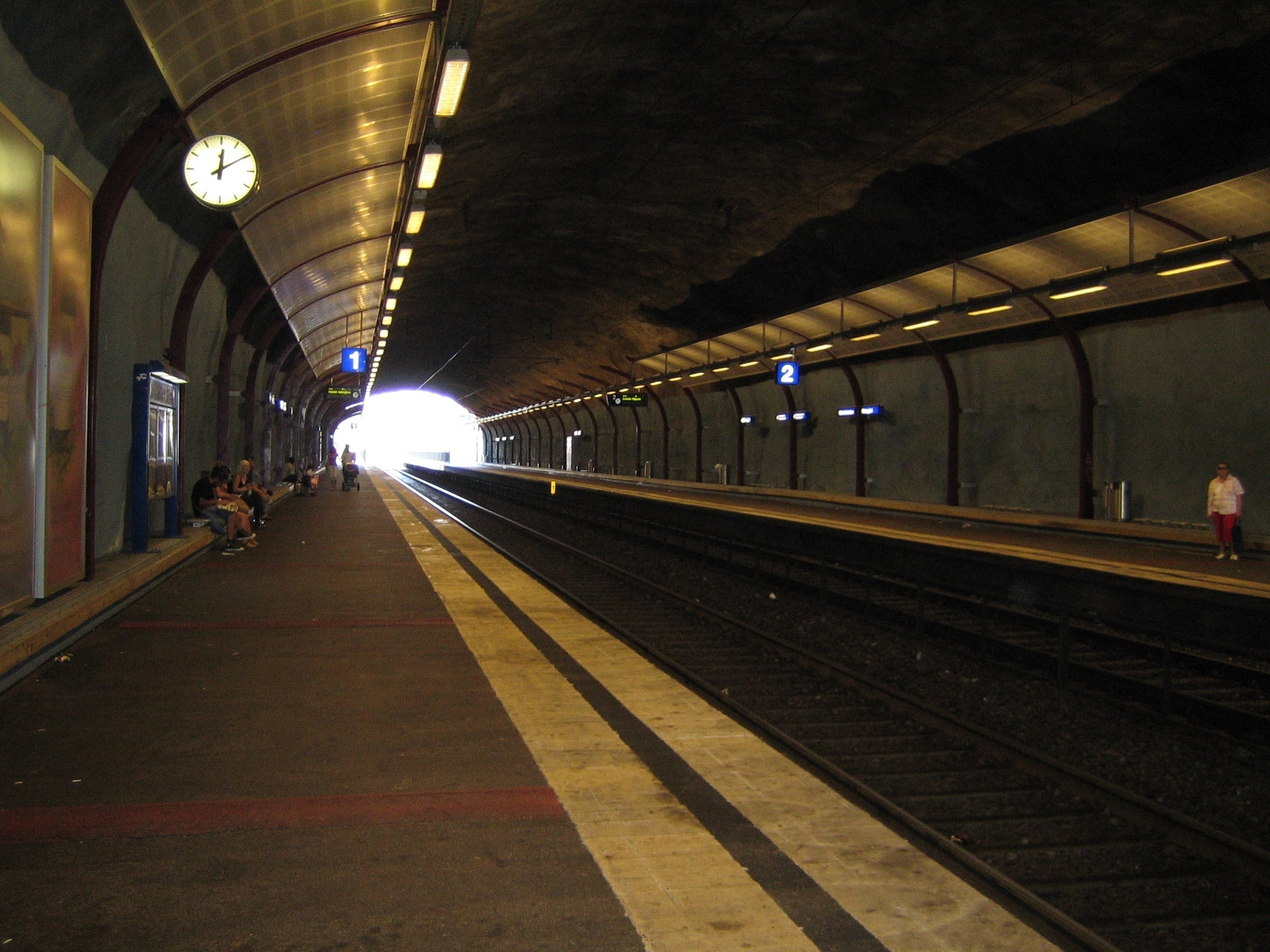
Malminkartano railway station (2010)

While most of the Martinlaakso line was opened in June 1975, Malminkartano was not one of its original stations as the suburbs around it were still under heavy construction around the time. Unlike the other stations on the line which had 220 metres (720 ft) long platforms, the ones at Malminkartano were built longer at 280 metres (920 ft), in anticipation of increases in passenger numbers, leading to a need to use Sm1/Sm2 combos longer than four units. The station was opened just under three years later, on 28 May 1978. It became the first station in the country to be located in a tunnel.

Trains initially stopped in the south side of the tunnel. As the construction of residential buildings in Malminkartano reached the plots north of the tunnel, the stopping point was moved to its midway point to function as a compromise between the original residents south of the tunnel and the new users of the station to its north.

In 1982, the tunnel's walls were painted with the country's first artistic graffiti, and then again in 1995 as part of a project with the participation of over 40 local artists. The works were eventually covered by illegally painted graffitis, which prompted the city of Helsinki to cover the entire wall with grey paint in 2004. The graffitis returned in October 2017 as part of a project arranged by the city, Helsinki City Transport and several other municipal actors, along with three sponsors from the paint industry.
