= Vantaankoski railway station =

Railway station in Vantaa, Finland

Vantaankoski Vandaforsen
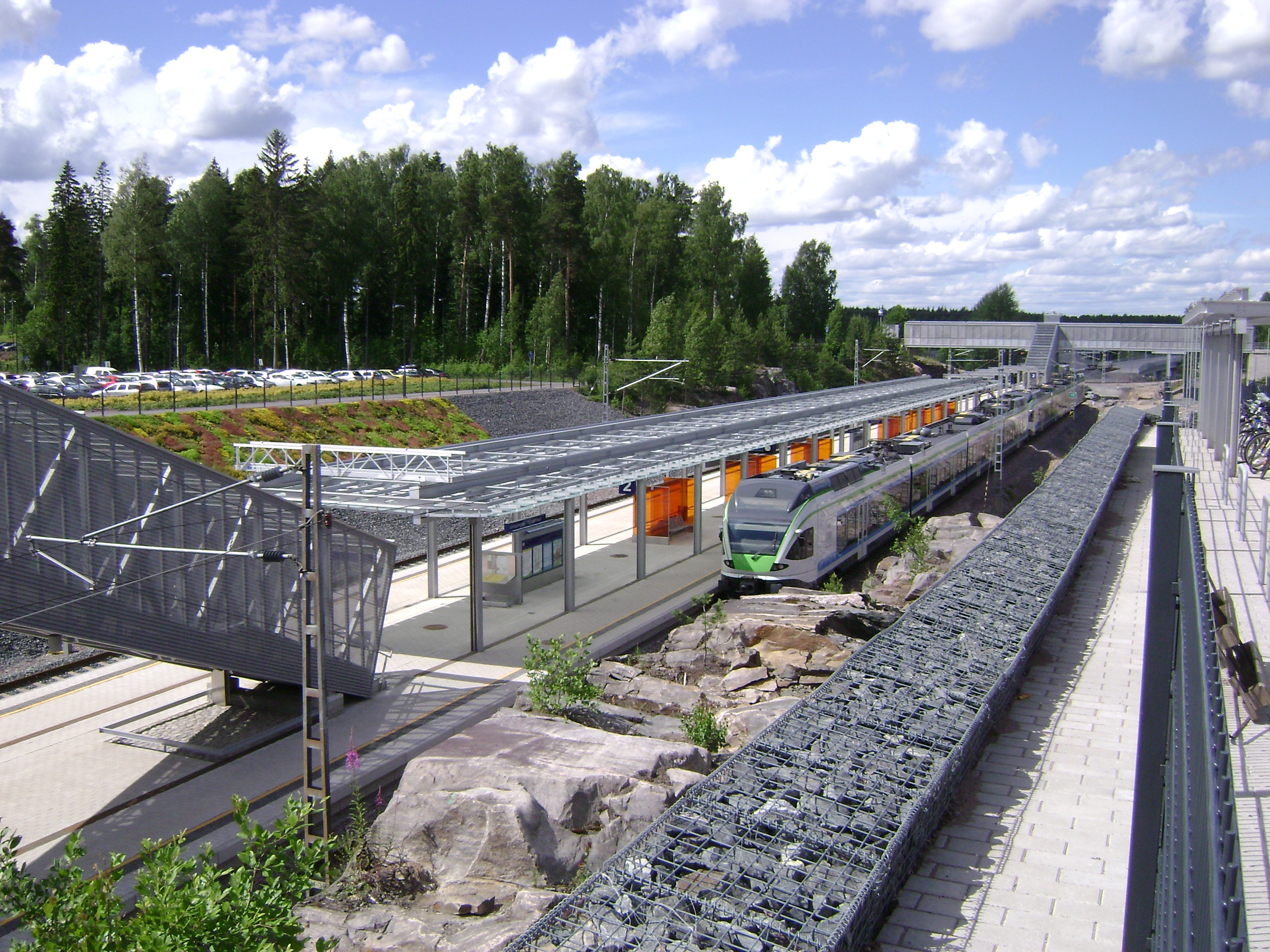

General information
- Location: Kivivuorentie 16, 01620; Martinlaakso, Vantaa, Uusimaa; Finland
- Coordinates: 60°17′09″N 24°50′53″E
- System: Helsinki commuter rail station
- Owner: Finnish Transport Agency
- Line: Ring Rail Line
- Platforms: 1 island platform
- Tracks: 2
- Train operators: VR on behalf of HSL
- Connections: Helsinki buses

Construction
- Structure type: ground station

Other information
- Station code: Vks
- Fare zone: B
- Classification: Halt

History
- Opened: 2 September 1991

Passengers
- 2019: 979,455

Services
| Preceding station | Helsinki commuter rail | Following station |
|---|---|---|
| Vehkala One-way operation | I counterclockwise via Tikkurila | Martinlaakso towards Helsinki |
| Martinlaakso One-way operation | P clockwise via Myyrmäki | Vehkala towards Helsinki via Airport |
Location

Vantaankoski railway station (Finnish: Vantaankosken rautatieasema, Swedish: Vandaforsens järnvägsstation) is a Helsinki commuter rail station located in Vantaa, Finland. It is approximately 15 kilometres (9.3 mi) north of the Helsinki Central railway station.

The station is part of the Ring Rail Line (Kehärata) route, which links Helsinki-Vantaa Airport and central Vantaa with the Helsinki commuter train network. The station was the northbound terminus for the M commuter line from central Helsinki until 2015. The next station to the south is Martinlaakso, which was the northern terminus of the M line until the construction of Vantaankoski in 1991. The station has an island platform and local bus connections are available nearby.

== History ==
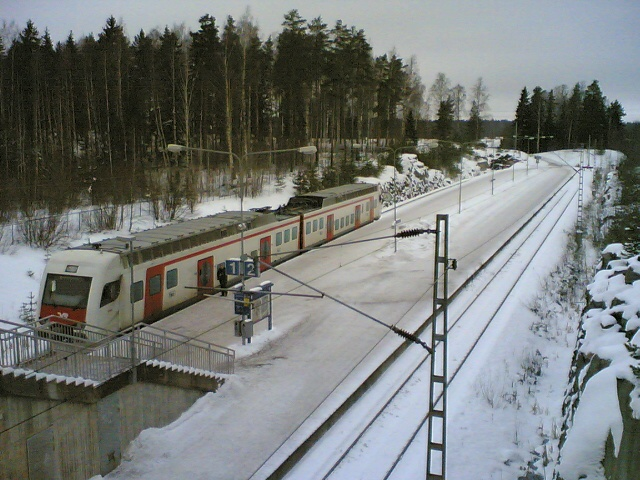
Vantaankoski before rebuilding

In the 1970s, Sanoma engaged in negotiations with the Finnish State Railways over the possibility of extending the Martinlaakso line to reach its new printing facilities in the Martinlaakso district. Although the FSR expressed interest in the project at the time, the negotiations seemingly broke down at some point near the end of the 1970s.

The city of Vantaa raised the matter once again some 10 years later; its plan was to extend the line over the north side of the Ring III highway, to serve the developing district of Myllymäki. This would not happen at its full extent until the building of the Ring Rail Line, though a 900 metres (0.56 mi) extension from Martinlaakso to Vantaankoski was opened on 2 September 1991. The new station underwent several changes of name over the course of the project; from Sanomala (deemed inappropriate due to the direct reference to a private company), to Tyttökumpu (after a nearby residential area), to finally Vantaankoski, which the city of Vantaa had proposed.

The station was thoroughly rebuilt during the Ring Rail Line project. A brand new pedestrian bridge over the north side of the platforms was built, establishing a new connection for use by arriving and departing passengers.

== Services ==
Vantaankoski is served by lines I and P to the Helsinki Airport on the Helsinki commuter rail network. Both of these lines make stops at all stations on their routes. P trains to the airport stop on track 1, while I trains to Helsinki use track 2. The station has a HSL ticket vending machine, as well as elevators and 55 centimetres (22 in) high platforms for accessibility.

HSL bus connections are provided with the Vantaankosken asema terminus on the east side of the station, as well as the Kivivuorentie stops on the streets of Kivivuorentie and Martinkyläntie. The terminus is accompanied by a Vantaa city bike terminal. Park and ride services are provided with a parking lot on the western side. The Vantaankoski station, as well as its surrounding bus stops, belong to HSL fare zone B.

== Gallery ==
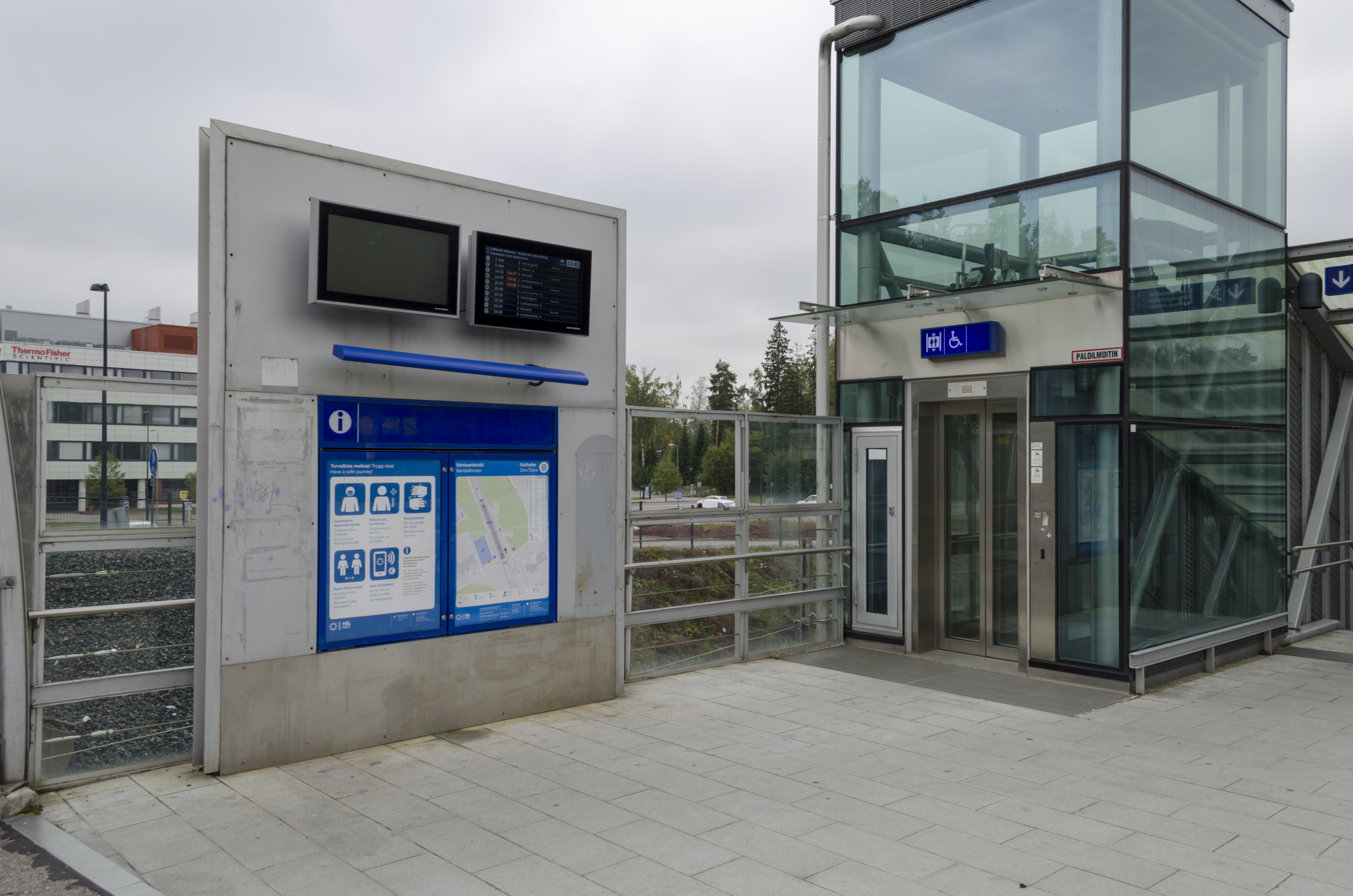
Southern entrance on Martinkyläntie

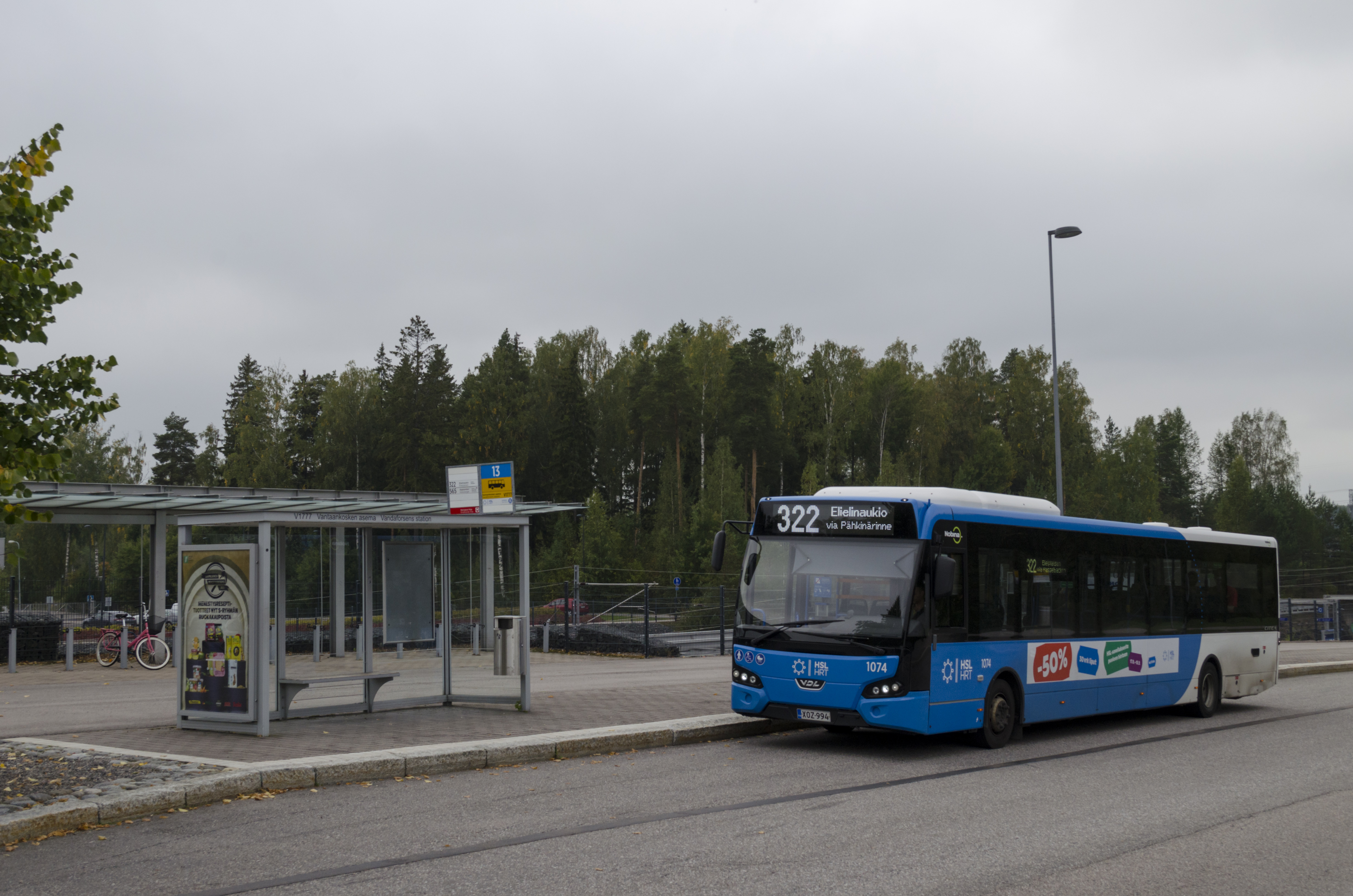
Bus terminus on Kivivuorentie

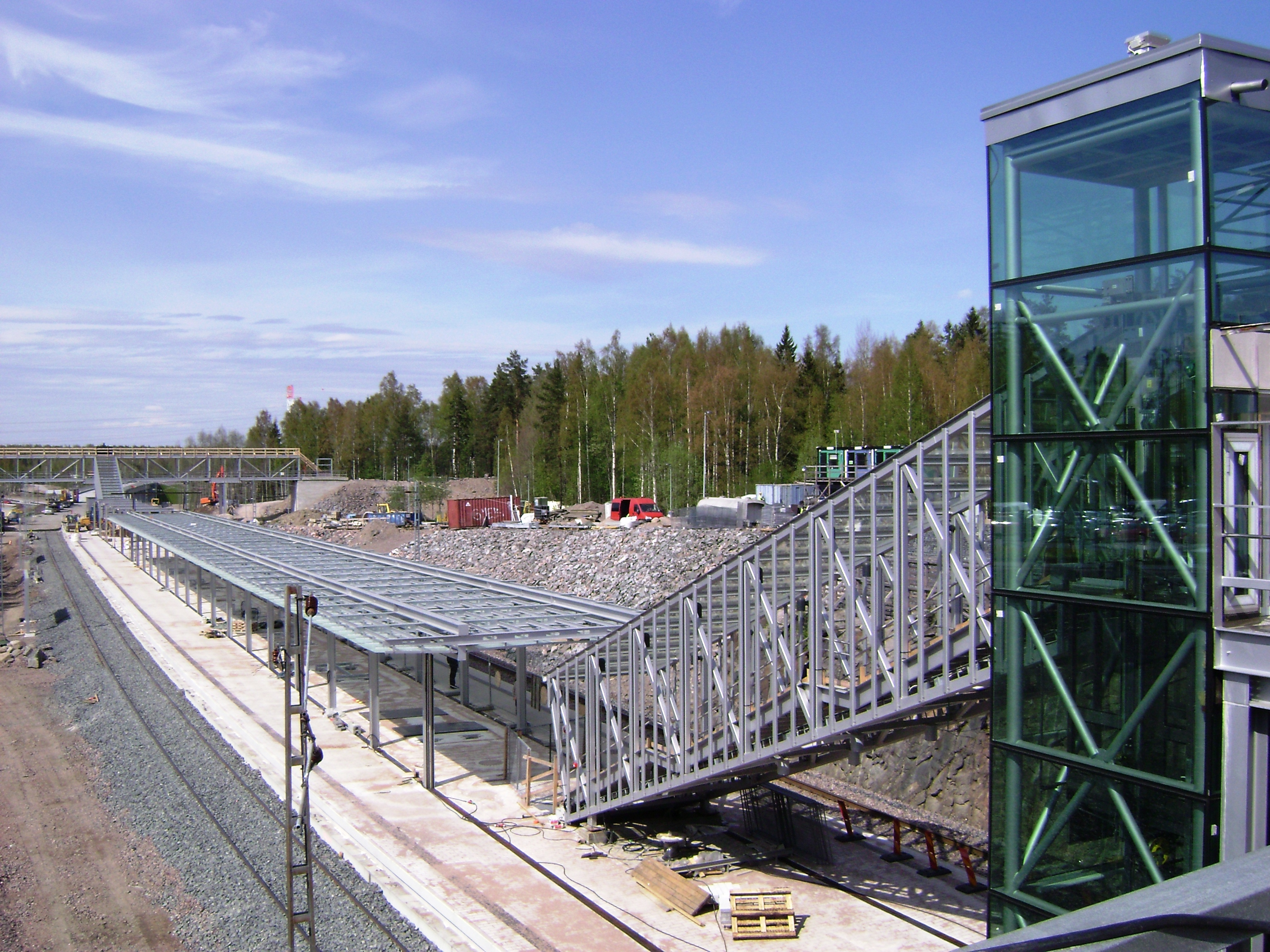
The station being rebuilt in 2012
