= Myyrmäki =

Myyrmäki Myrbacka
- City district
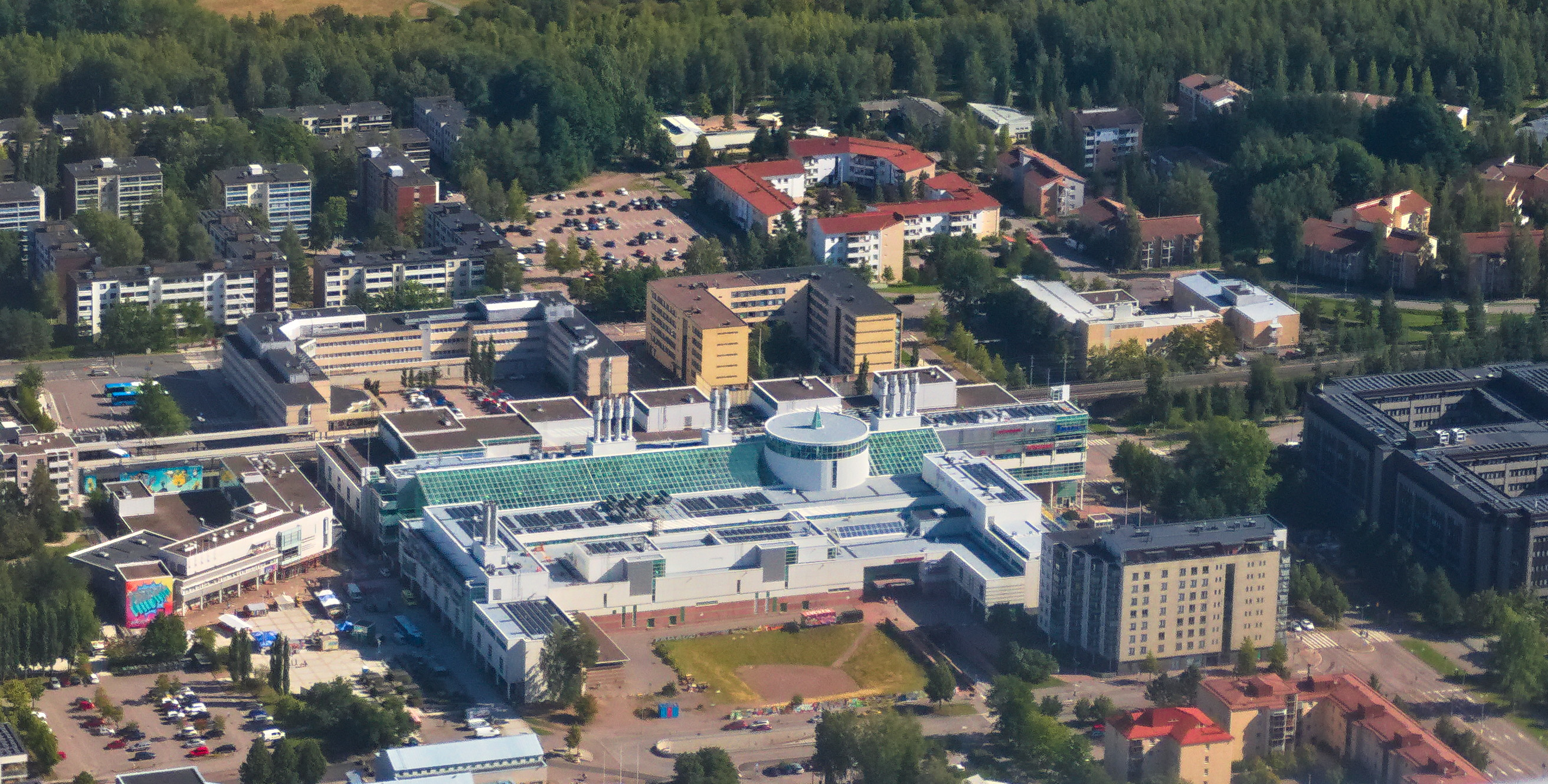

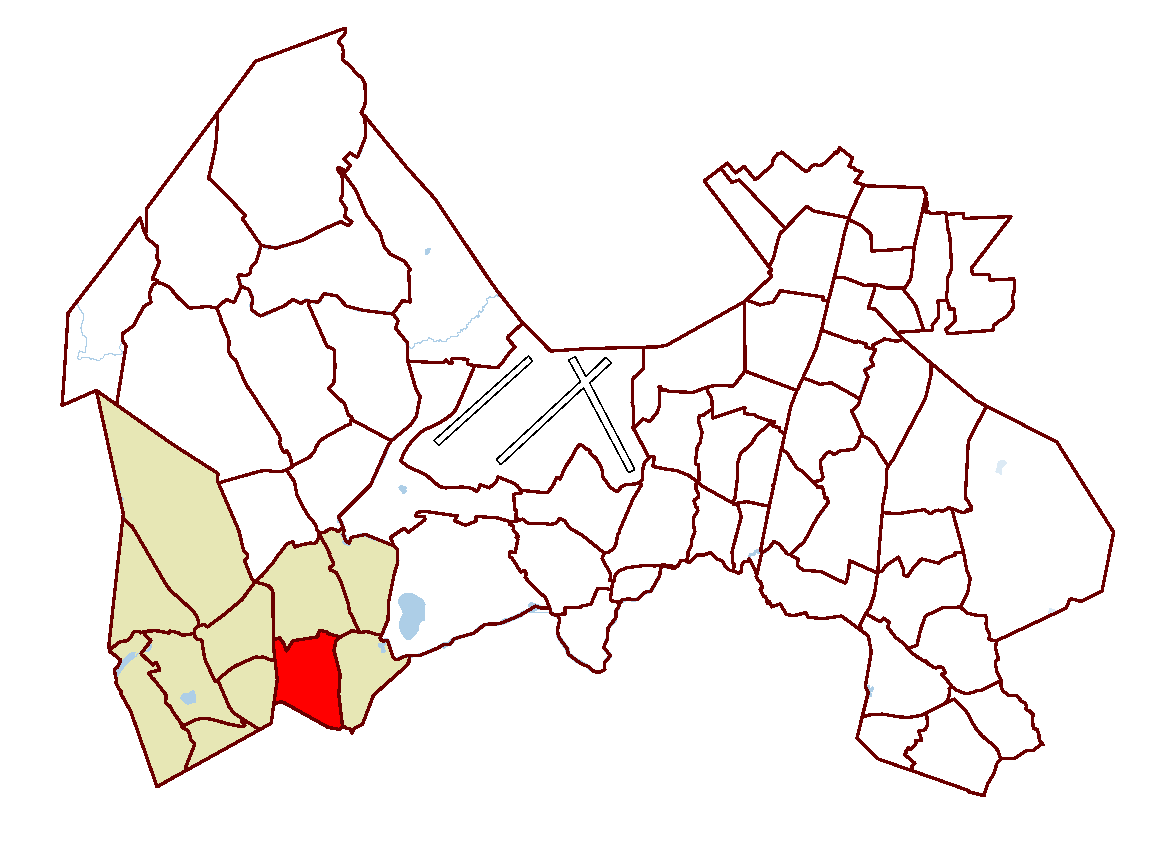
- Location on the map of Vantaa, with the district in red and the major region in light brown
- Coordinates: 60°16′00″N 24°51′00″E
- Country: Finland
- City: Vantaa
- Major region: Myyrmäki

Area
  - Total: 2.7 km^{2} (1.0 sq mi)
  - Major region: 35.4 km^{2} (13.7 sq mi)

Population (1.1.2014)
  - Total: 15,758
  - Density: 5,800/km^{2} (15,000/sq mi)
  - Major region: 52,267
  - Major region density: 1,480/km^{2} (3,820/sq mi)
- Time zone: GMT +2
- Postal Code(s): 01600, 01601
- Website: www.vantaa.fi/frontpage/

Myyrmäki (Finnish: [ˈmyːrˌmæki]; Swedish: Myrbacka; lit. 'Bog Hill') is a district and major region of the municipality of Vantaa, Finland. The district has an area of 2.7 square kilometres (1.0 sq mi) and a population of about 17,000, making it the most populous district in Vantaa. It is home to Myyrmanni, a large shopping complex.

The Myyrmäki major region consists of 11 districts with a total population of 52,267 (as of 1.1.2014), making it the most populous major region in Vantaa. The safety situation in Myyrmäki has deteriorated over the years and it is currently classified as the most dangerous district of Vantaa.

The area is served by the Myyrmäki and Louhela stations on the I and P lines of the Helsinki commuter rail network. Just to the south-east is Malminkartanonhuippu, an artificial hill which is the highest point in Helsinki.

== Facilities and services ==
Due to its size, Myyrmäki serves as a hub for public services in western Vantaa. It is home to several shopping centers, the largest of which is Myyrmanni. The Metropolia University of Applied Sciences has a campus in Myyrmäki which focuses on sustainable technology and business. Additionally, Myyrmäkitalo (literally "Myyrmäki house") hosts Vantaa Art Museum the Myyrmäki library, and arenas, such as Energia Areena, Myyrmäen jalkapallostadion are located in the district.

== See also ==
- Myyrmäki Church
- Myyrmanni
- Pähkinärinne
