= Myyrmanni =

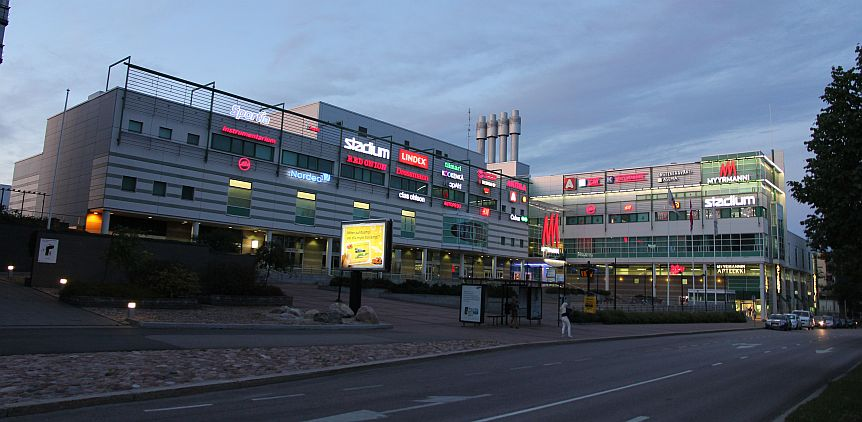
- Myyrmanni Shopping Centre in August 2013
- Location: Myyrmäki, Vantaa, Finland
- Coordinates: 60°15′37″N 024°51′12″E
- Opened: 1994
- Owner: Citycon Oyj
- Num. of stores: 127
- Num. of anchor tenants: 2
- Floor area: 42,000 m^{2} (452,084 sq ft)
- Floors: 3
- Parking: 1,100 bays
- Website: www.myyrmanni.fi

Myyrmanni is a shopping center in the Myyrmäki suburb of Vantaa, Finland. The center was built in the early 1990s and has over 90 stores and 1,100 parking spaces. The main tenants of the shopping center include K-Citymarket, Prisma, Tokmanni, Clas Ohlson, Jysk, Lindex, Alko and Burger King.

From the center of Helsinki, Myyrmanni is best reached by bus route 300 or P-train to Myyrmäki Station, located next to the mall.

== History ==
=== 1994 to 2002 ===
Myyrmanni was opened on 2 October 1994. At the time it was the second biggest shopping centre in Finland after the Itäkeskus shopping centre in Helsinki; it was later surpassed by newer shopping centres opened relatively close by, such as the Jumbo and Sello shopping centres. Right from the beginning, Myyrmanni included shops such as Anttila, K-Citymarket, Tarjoustalo and a restaurant world consisting of six restaurants.

Already in its first year, there were about six million visitors to Myyrmanni. At first the premises were owned by the company Megamyyri Oy, which was partly owned by the Sampo Group and the Kansallis-Osake-Pankki bank and partly by the Kesko group and the Ilmarinen insurance company. Citycon bought the majority of Myyrmanni in 1999.

=== Myyrmanni bombing ===
Myyrmanni was the site of a bombing on October 11, 2002, where seven people were killed.

=== 2003 onwards ===
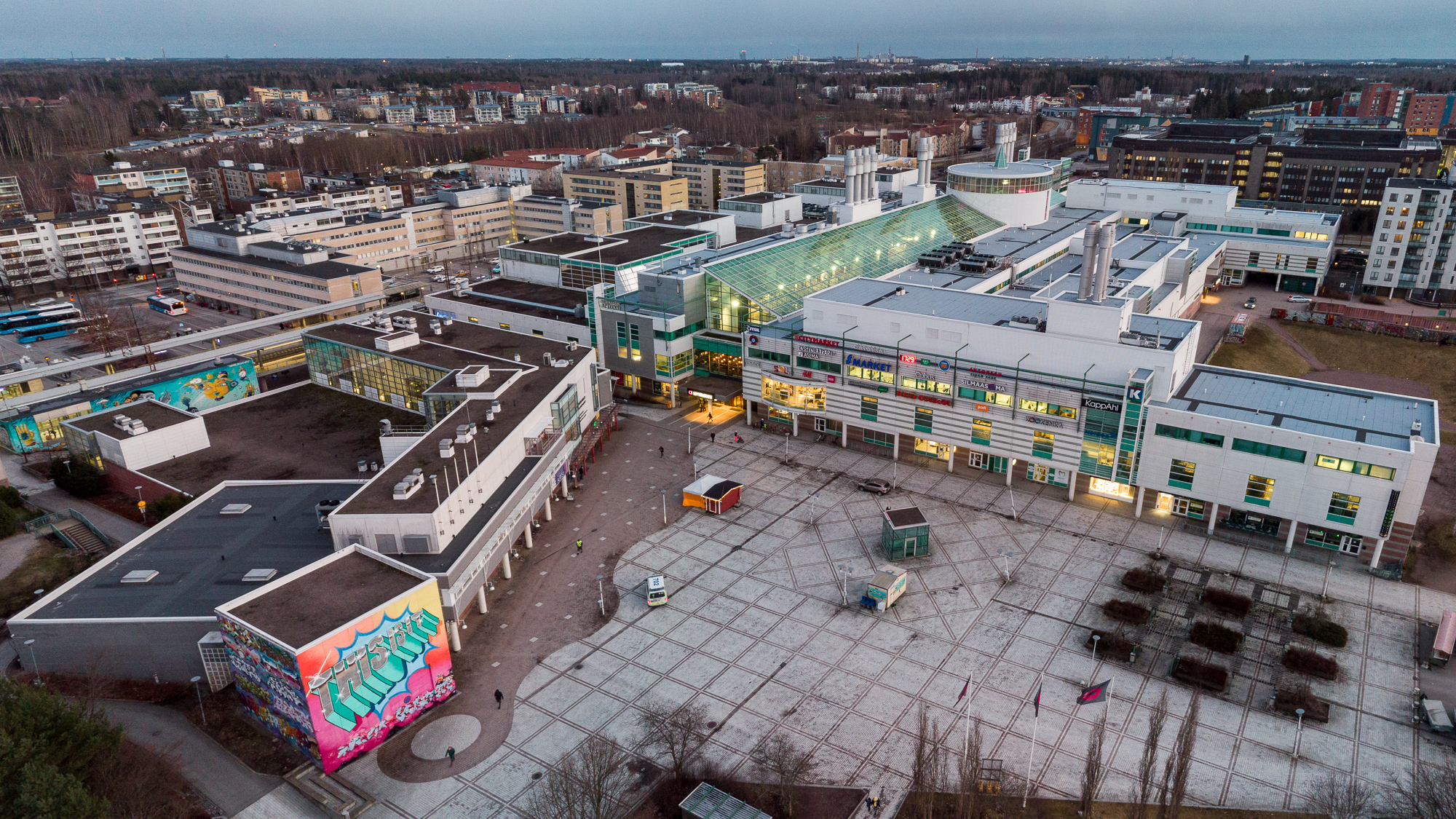
Myyrmanni in February 2020

In 2005 there were about 7.1 million visitors to Myyrmanni and its total sales amounted to about 158 million euro. In January 2006 Citycon bought the remaining 26 percent of Myyrmanni's shares.

In 2010, the mall attempted to improve the customer flow to the second floor, as there were queues at the landscape lifts, and the steel car lifts were ignored. Kone Lifts turned the elevators into a Hall of Fame for the 'Incredibles' comic strip characters. Making their elevators more attractive to the public solved the people flow problem. This practical case of service design thinking is used in literature as an example of extending products into services.

The Anttila store ay Myyrmanni cosed down in 2015. In March 2016 a large renovation at Myyrmanni was completed. The renovation brought many new and renovated stores to Myyrmanni. As sales of goods had largely moved to the Internet, the shopping centre expanded its selection of services, cafés and restaurants. The Citymarket store at Myyrmanni was its only grocery store for a long time, until an S-market grocery store was opened at Myyrmanni in 2017. A Tokmanni store was opened at Myyrmanni in March 2020.

In early 2022 the UFF, H&M, Vero Moda and Suomalainen Kirjakauppa stores at Myyrmanni closed down. A Prisma store and a Lidl store were opened at Myyrmanni in Autumn 2023.
