= Myyrmäki railway station =

Railway station in Vantaa, Finland

Myyrmäki Myrbacka
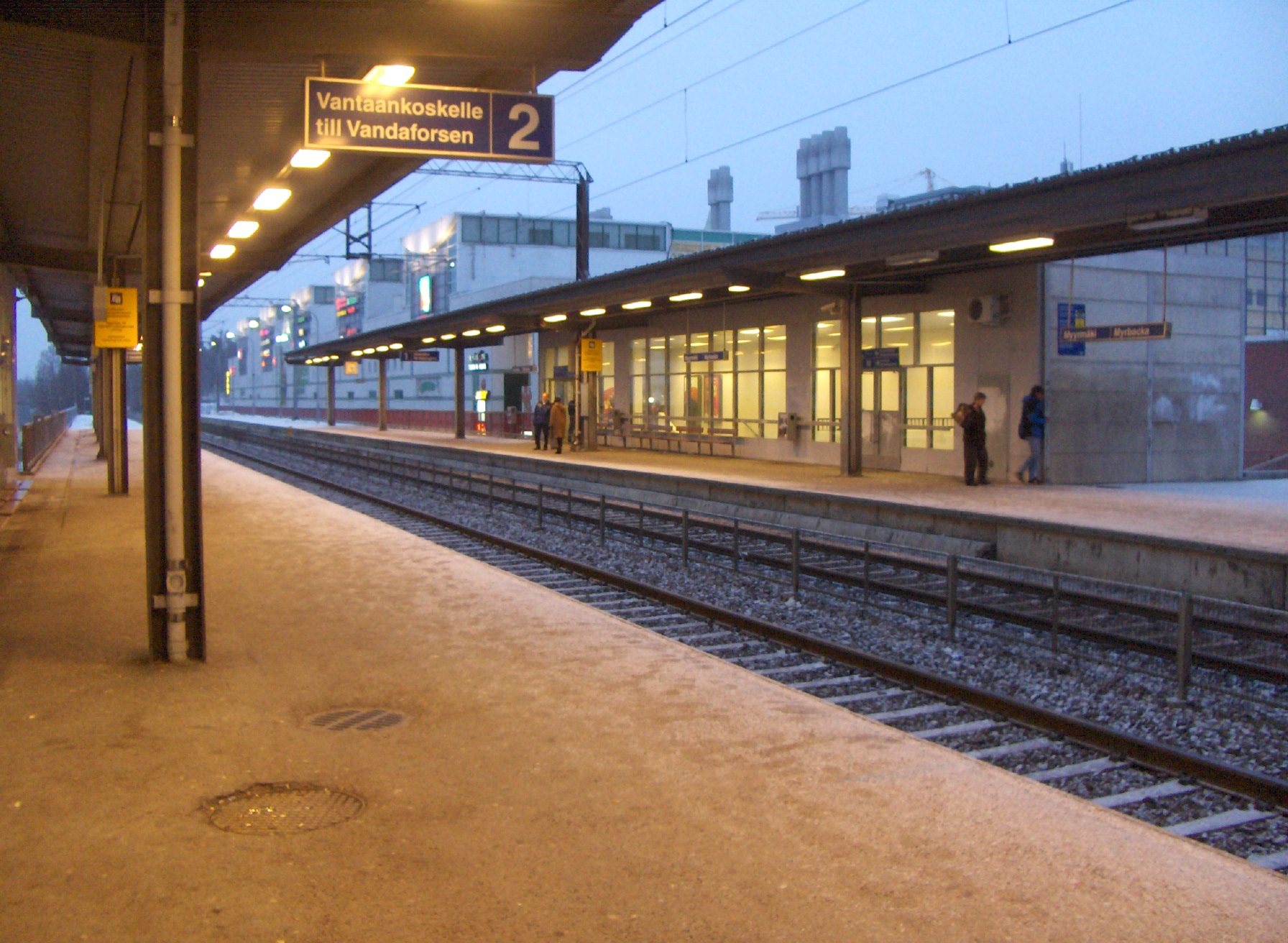

General information
- Location: Jönsaksentie 6, 01600; Myyrmäki, Vantaa, Uusimaa; Finland
- Coordinates: 60°15′41″N 024°51′18″E
- System: Helsinki commuter rail station
- Owner: City of Vantaa
- Line: Ring Rail Line
- Platforms: 2 side platforms
- Tracks: 2
- Train operators: VR on behalf of HSL
- Connections: Helsinki buses

Construction
- Structure type: elevated station
- Accessible: 2

Other information
- Station code: Myr
- Fare zone: B

History
- Opened: 1 June 1975

Passengers
- 2019: 4,280,011

Services
Preceding station	Helsinki commuter rail	Following station
Louhela One-way operation	I counterclockwise via Tikkurila	Malminkartano towards Helsinki
Malminkartano One-way operation	P clockwise via Myyrmäki	Louhela towards Helsinki via Airport
Location

Myyrmäki (Finnish) or Myrbacka (Swedish) is a Helsinki commuter rail and bus station located in Vantaa, Finland. It is approximately 12 kilometres (7.5 mi) north of Helsinki Central railway station.

The station is served by circular lines I and P, and is between the stations of Malminkartano and Louhela.

The station has two platforms, one for southbound and one for northbound trains. There is also a waiting room although ticket sales from the station have recently been discontinued. At the moment the nearest place for purchasing long distance tickets would be Pasila. The Myyrmanni shopping centre is situated nearby.
