= Lappohja railway station =

Railway station in Hanko, Finland

Lappohja Lappvik
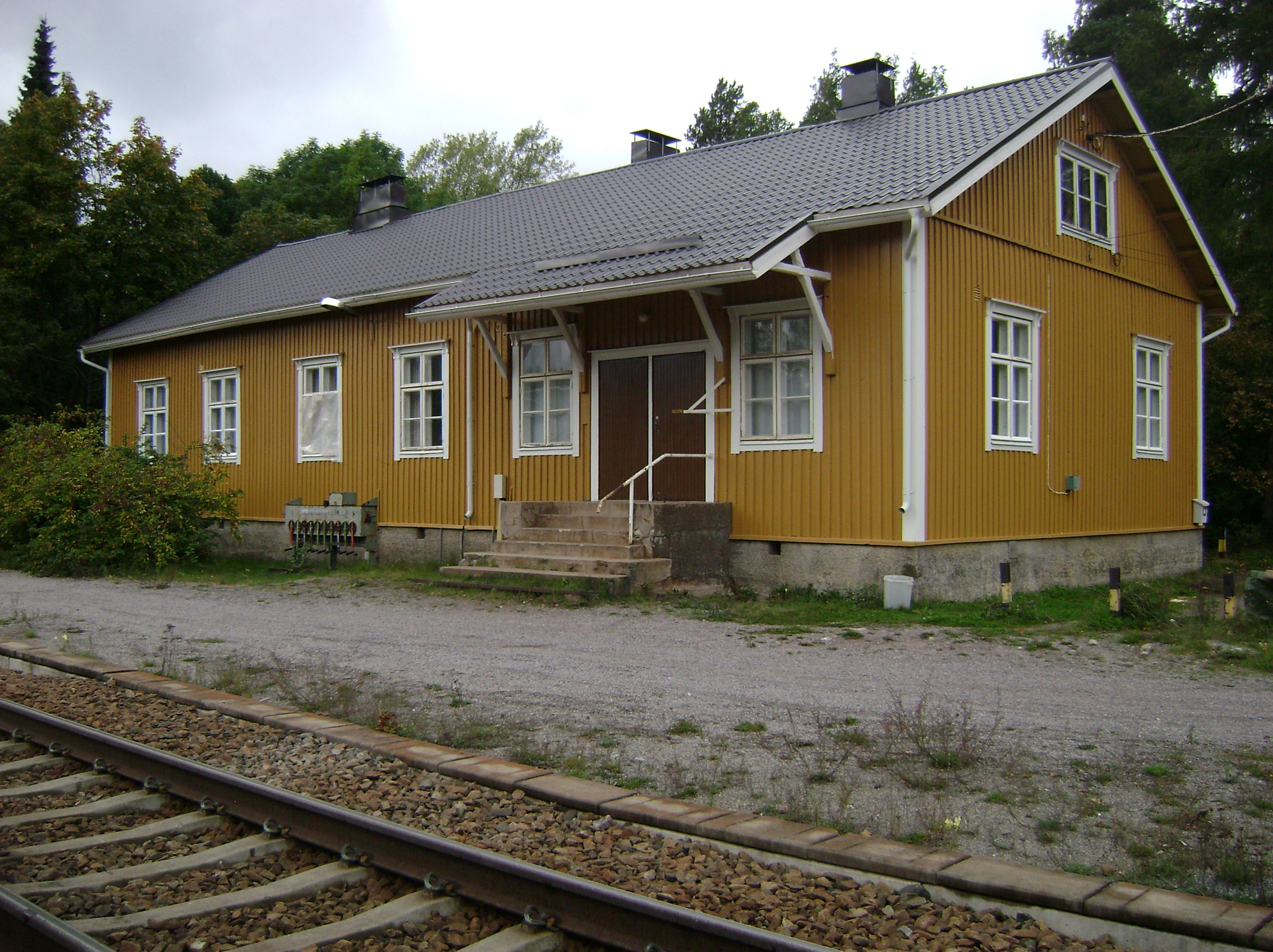

General information
- Location: Koverharintie, 10820; Lappohja, Hanko; Finland
- Coordinates: 59°54.249′N 023°14.215′E
- System: VR station
- Owner: Finnish Transport Infrastructure Agency
- Operator: VR Group
- Line: Karis–Hanko
- Platforms: 1 side platform

Other information
- Station code: Lpo
- Classification: Operating point

History
- Opened: 8 October 1873

Passengers
- 2008: 15,000

Services
Preceding station	VR commuter rail	Following station
Skogby towards Karis or Helsinki	H	Santala towards Hanko
Location

The Lappohja railway station (Finnish: Lappohjan rautatieasema; formerly Lappviikin rautatieasema, Swedish: Lappvik järnvägsstation) is located in the town of Hanko (formerly the municipality of Tenala), Finland, in the village of Lappohja. It is along the Karis–Hanko railway, and its neighboring stations are Skogby in the east and Santala in the west.

== History ==
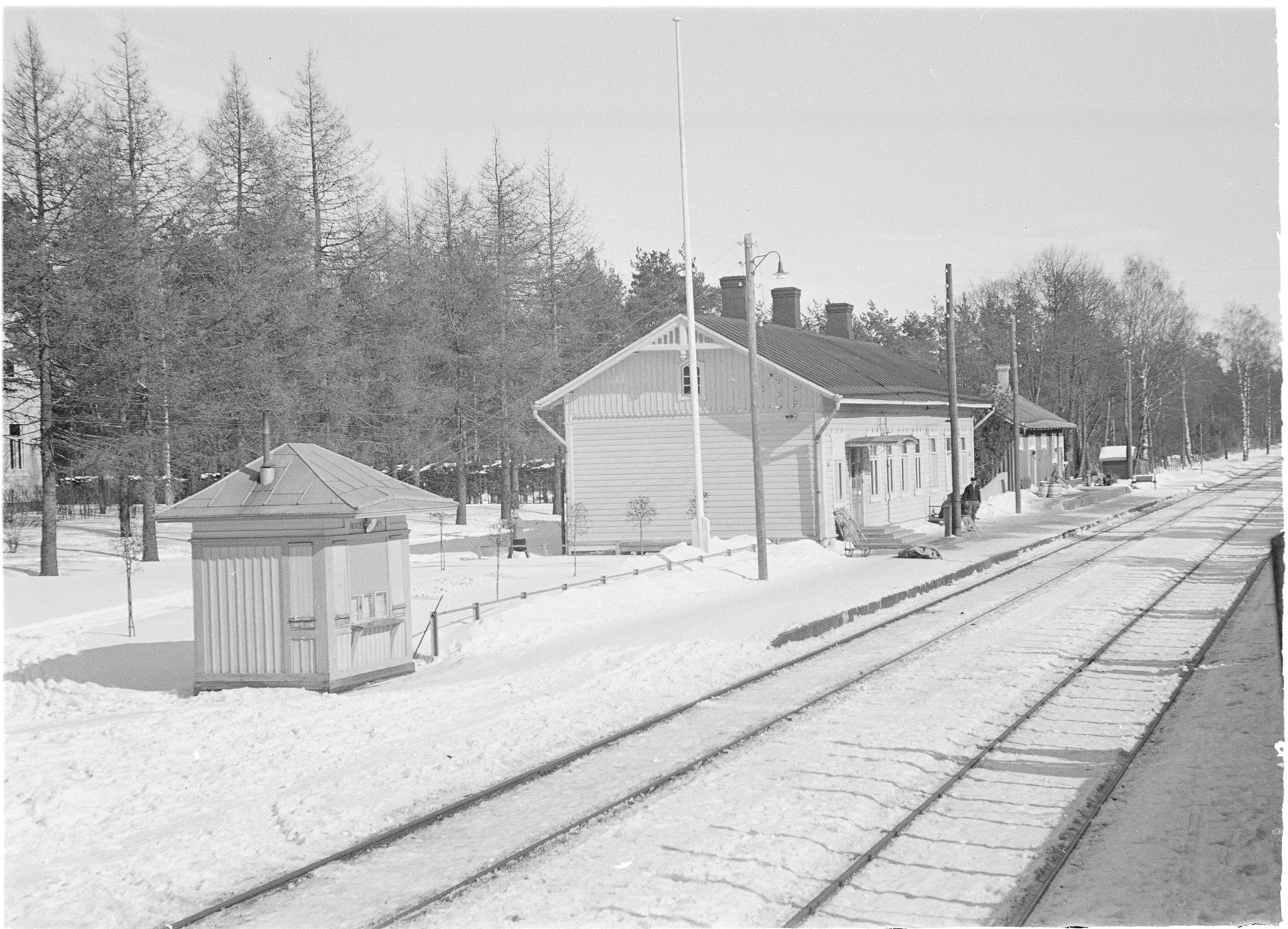
Lappohja in March 1940, shortly before its surrender to the Soviets

Lappohja is one of the original stations of the private Hyvinkää–Hanko railway; it was placed close to the location where the line meets the natural harbour of the Tvärminne Storfjärden bay of the Gulf of Finland. In 1876, one year after the railway was nationalized, a 2 kilometres (1.2 mi) long siding was built from the station to the harbour. The majority of cargo transport on the line consisted of timber.

Lappohja was included in the area leased by Finland to the Soviet Union in the aftermath of the Winter War. On the onset of the Continuation War and the escape of Soviet troops from Hanko, it was discovered that the original station building and the harbour siding had been destroyed. The former was replaced by a new building of a simple design in 1942. As the importance of the station grew during the time of war, it was upgraded from a pysäkki to a class V station in 1944 and further to class IV in 1945.

In 1962, a siding from the west side of the station to the Koverhar steelworks was constructed. Another siding followed in 1986, this time from the east side to the Rautaruukki factory. Ticket sale services at Lappohja were ceased in 2000, and it became an unstaffed station later in the same year due to the Karis–Hanko section becoming remote controlled. The station building was transferred to the ownership of Senate Properties in 2007.

== Services ==
Lappohja is served by H commuter trains on the Karis–Hanko line. The station does not have a VR service point nor a ticket vending machine, though it has a 55 centimetres (22 in) high platforms for accessible entry onto low-floor trains.
