= HKP =

HKP may refer to:

- Hanko Northern railway station, in Finland
- Himachal Kranti Party, a political party in Himachal Pradesh, India
- Hong Kong Phooey, an American animated television series
- Hong Kong Police Force
- Kaanapali Airport, in Hawaii, United States
- OpenPGP HTTP Keyserver Protocol
- People's Liberation Party (Turkey) (Turkish: Halkın Kurtuluş Partisi), a Marxist–Leninist group in Turkey
- Croatian Catholic movement (Croatian: Hrvatski katolički pokret)
