= Santala railway station =

Railway station in Hanko, Finland

Santala Sandö
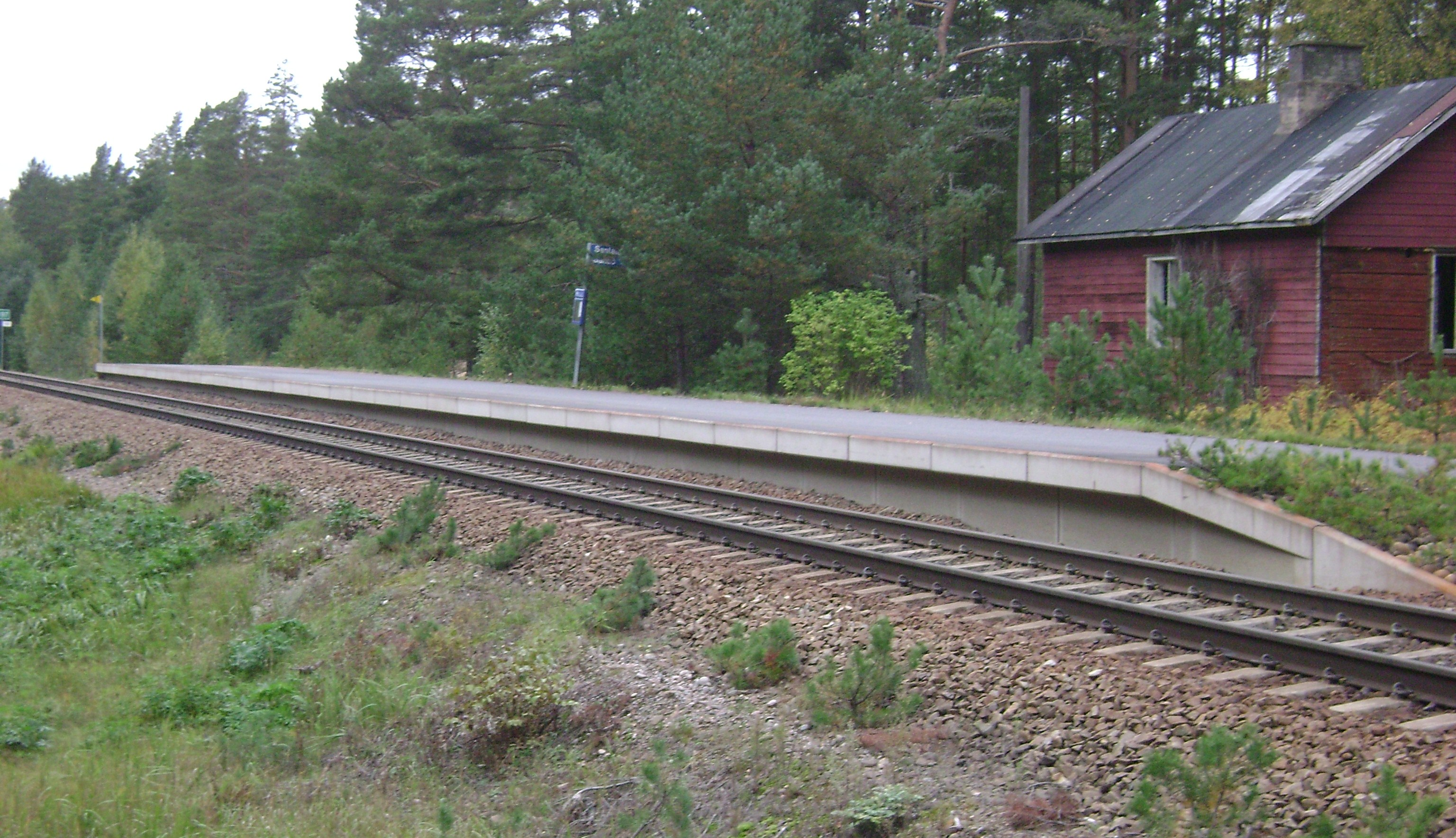
- Santala railway station on September 28, 2011.

General information
- Location: Hjalmar Braxénin tie, 10900; Hanko; Finland
- Coordinates: 59°52′30″N 023°07′17″E
- System: VR station
- Owner: Finnish Transport Infrastructure Agency
- Line: Karis–Hanko railway
- Platforms: 1 side platform
- Tracks: 1
- Train operators: VR (regional trains)

Other information
- Station code: Sta
- Classification: Halt

History
- Opened: 1898

Passengers
- 2008: 2,000

Services
Preceding station	VR commuter rail	Following station
Lappohja towards Karis or Helsinki	H	Hanko Northern towards Hanko
Location
- Location within Uusimaa Location within Finland

Santala railway station (abbrev. Sta, Finnish: Santalan seisake and Swedish: Sandö station) is a railway stop in the city of Hanko, Finland along the Hanko-Hyvinkää Railroad. The stop is located approximately 197 kilometers from Helsinki Central railway station. Local trains between Karis and Hanko stops there. The stop is located by a forest and its usage level is low though the Finnish national road 25 is near.

== History ==
The Santala halt was originally opened as a small stop (known as laituri in the old classification of railway stations in Finland used until 1969) operating under the Hanko railway station in 1898 and at the same time a branch for loading wood was introduced on the western side of the stop.

A Plattformskjul I-type station building, designed by Bruno Granholm, was completed likely in the early 1900s but it was destroyed in a fire when the Hanko Naval Base leased to the Soviet Union in 1940 was reclaimed by Finland in 1941. The stop was turned into a halt the next year.

The Santala halt was supposed to be closed in 1989, but passenger trains continued to stop there on demand, even though the stop was not marked on the train timetables. Santala halt was eventually closed in 1998 but was re-opened already the next year to serve the students of the nearby community college. A new platform was built at the halt the same year.
