= Skogby railway station =

Railway station in Raseborg, Finland

Skogby
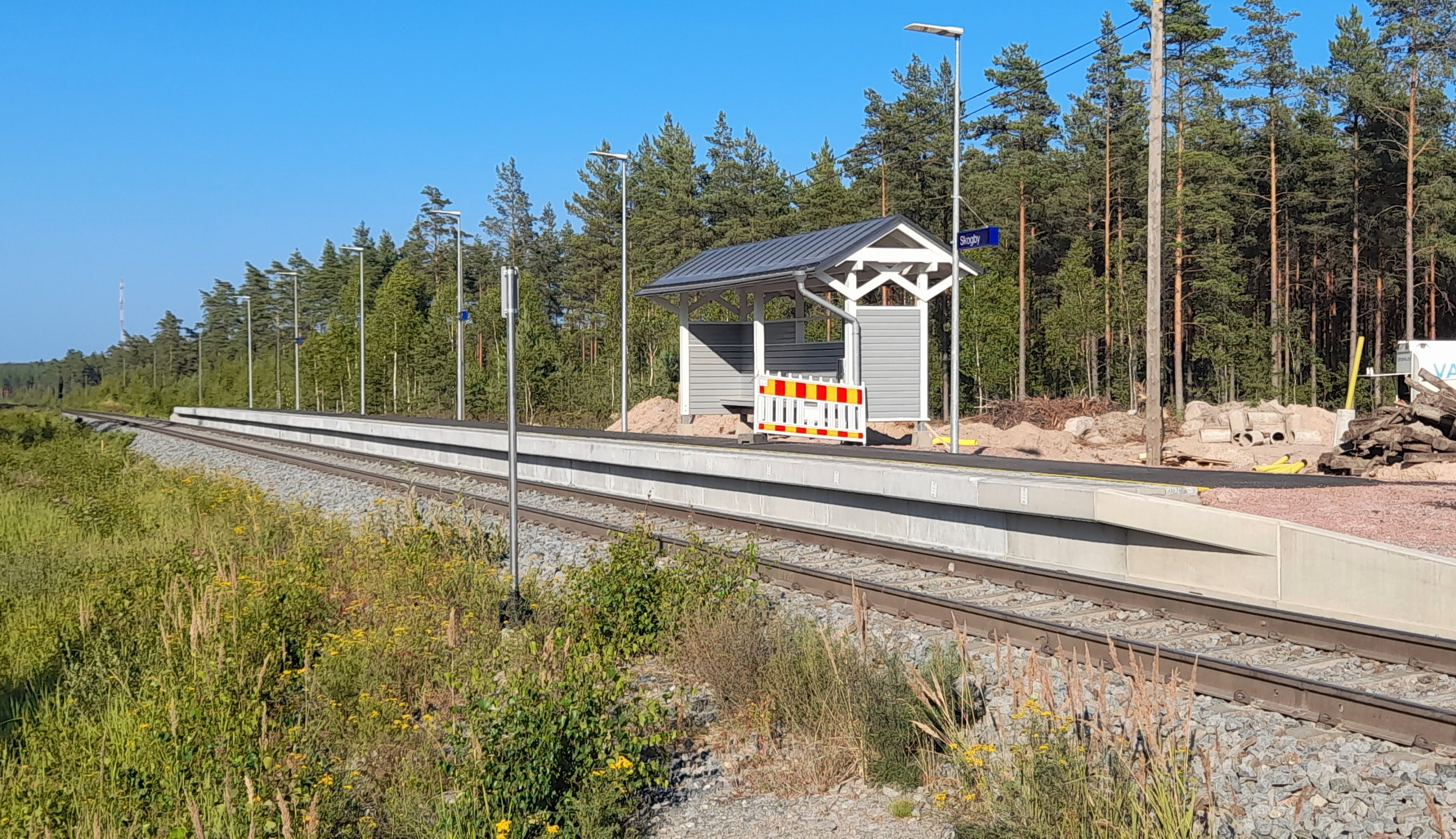

General information
- Location: Hangövägen, 10680; Skogby, Raseborg; Finland
- Coordinates: 59°55.574′N 023°18.689′E
- System: VR station
- Owner: Finnish Transport Infrastructure Agency
- Line: Karis–Hanko railway
- Platforms: 1 side platform
- Tracks: 1
- Train operators: VR (commuter trains)

Other information
- Station code: Sgy
- Classification: Halt

History
- Opened: 15 September 1931

Passengers
- 2008: 3,000

Services
| Preceding station | VR commuter rail | Following station |
|---|---|---|
| Ekenäs towards Karis or Helsinki | H | Lappohja towards Hanko |
Location
- Location within Uusimaa Location within Finland

The Skogby railway station (Swedish: Skogby järnvägsstation, Finnish: Skogbyn rautatieasema) is located in the town of Raseborg (formerly the municipality of Tenala), Finland, in the village of Skogby. It is located along the Karis–Hanko railway, and its neighboring stations are Lappohja in the west and Ekenäs in the east.

== History ==
As the Karis–Hanko railway line was completed, there was a blast furnace, established already in the 17th century, active in the village of Skogby until 1904. A sawmill was established near the location of the Skogby station in 1889 and it had a network of narrow-gauge railway tracks.

Skogby railway station was opened on September 15, 1931. When the Hanko Peninsula was leased to the Soviet Union in 1940, Skogby acted as the terminus of the railway line. When Finland reclaimed the Hanko Peninsula in 1941, train traffic to Skogby ceased to the acts of war in the peninsula. The train traffic to Skogby was restarted in early 1942 and further to Hanko in February of the same year.

Freight traffic at the station ceased in 1964 and the station turned from a seisakevaihde (an unstaffed station for both passenger and freight traffic in the old classification of railway stations in Finland used until 1969) into a halt. The original station building has been demolished and nowadays there is only a small shelter on the platform.

== Services ==
Skogby is served by H commuter trains on the Karis–Hanko line.
