= Ekenäs railway station =

Railway station in Raseborg, Finland

Ekenäs Tammisaari
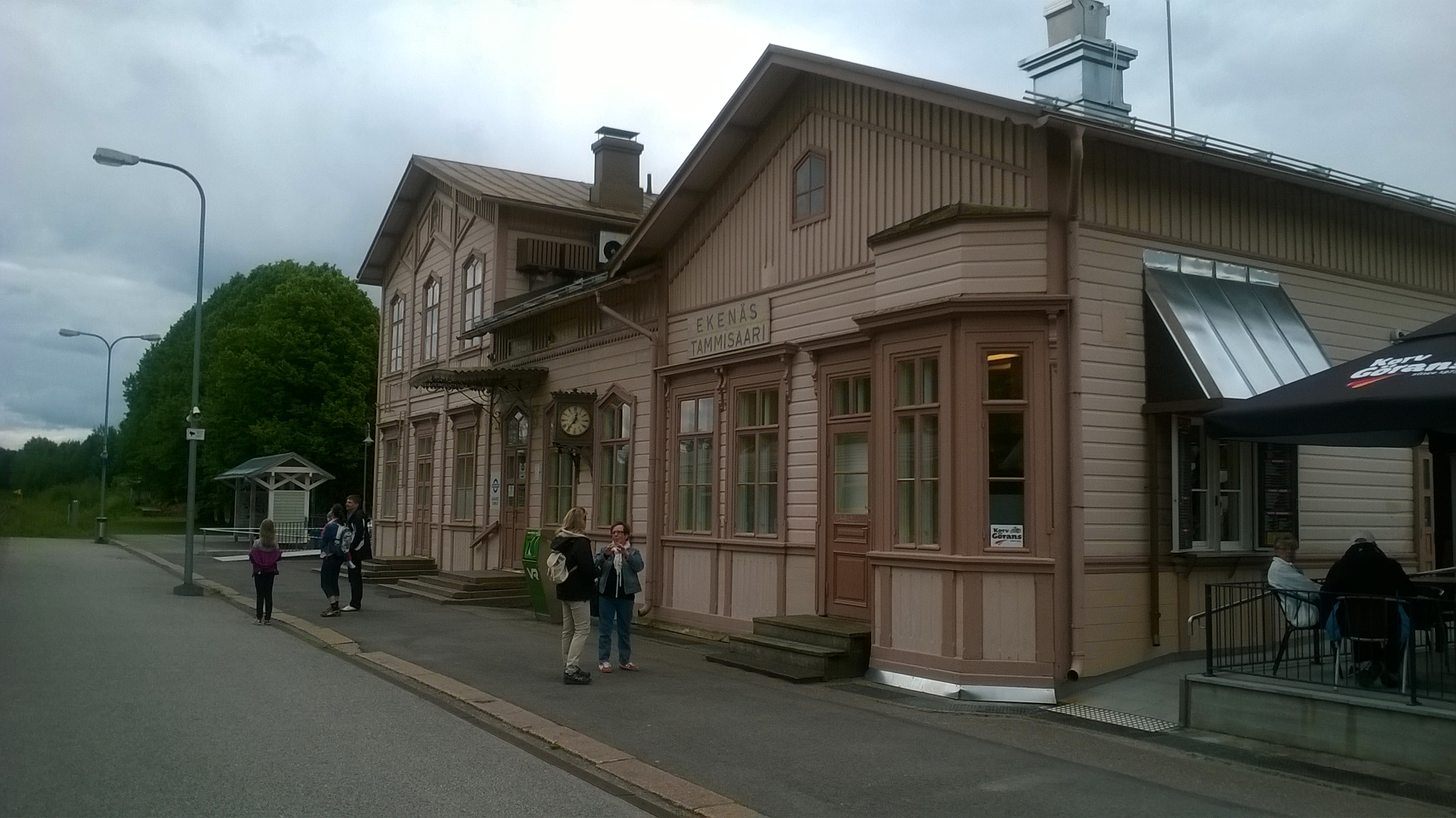

General information
- Location: Järnvägsgatan, 10600; Ekenäs, Raseborg; Finland
- Coordinates: 59°58′46″N 023°26′34″E
- System: VR station
- Owner: Finnish Transport Infrastructure Agency
- Line: Karis–Hanko railway
- Platforms: 1 side platform
- Tracks: 1
- Train operators: VR

Construction
- Architect: Knut Nylander

Other information
- Station code: Tms
- Classification: Halt

History
- Opened: 8 October 1873

Passengers
- 2008: 98,000

Services
Preceding station	VR commuter rail	Following station
Dragsvik towards Karis or Helsinki	H	Skogby towards Hanko
Location

The Ekenäs railway station (Swedish: Ekenäs järnvägsstation, Finnish: Tammisaaren rautatieasema) is located in Raseborg, Finland, in the urban area and city seat of Ekenäs. It is located along the Karis–Hanko railway, and its neighboring stations are Skogby in the west and Dragsvik in the east.

The Finnish Heritage Agency has proclaimed the Ekenäs station premises a nationally significant built cultural environment.

== History ==
In the planning stages of the private Hyvinkää–Hanko railroad in the 1860s, it was not originally intended for a station to be built in Ekenäs: instead, the line was intended to cut through the eastern side of the Pohjanpitäjänlahti bay, reaching Hanko via the ironworks of Svartå, Antskog and Fiskars as well as the port of Skuru. Eventually, it was decided to have the line follow the western coast of the bay instead, which helped Ekenäs reverse its trend of negative population growth starting in 1870.

After the conclusion of the Winter War and the subsequent leasing of the Hanko peninsula to the Soviet Union, Skogby became the terminus of the passenger trains on the line; however, on the onset of the Continuation War and the escape of Soviet troops from Hanko, regular passenger services to Ekenäs continued to be suspended over security concerns. Dragsvik became the terminus instead, and travellers bound for Ekenäs were subjected to a security check in Dragsvik, after which they had to continue their journey by foot.

The Ekenäs harbour line was dismantled in 1996, and the entire trackyard followed suit in 1999, being replaced by the new passing loop built in Dragsvik in 1998.

The station building was transferred to the ownership of Senate Properties and sold on in 2007. It was renovated and converted to a travel centre in 2013.

== Architecture ==
The Ekenäs station is one of the three preserved station houses of the original Hyvinkää-Hanko railway. The building, designed by Knut Nylander, was built in 1872-1873, and was already thoroughly repaired in 1877; its structures were also reinforced. It was extended by a third of its length towards the east in 1917. Even though some of the details of the design have changed since it was first built, e.g. various wooden ornaments on the outside have been dismantled and the indoors renovated, the station's current state is representative of its look in 1873.

The protected premises of the station also include the stationmaster's residence, two other residential buildings and their related facilities, and the former freight station building.

== Services ==
Ekenäs is served by H commuter trains on the Karis–Hanko line.
