= Dragsvik railway station =

Railway station in Raseborg, Finland

Dragsvik
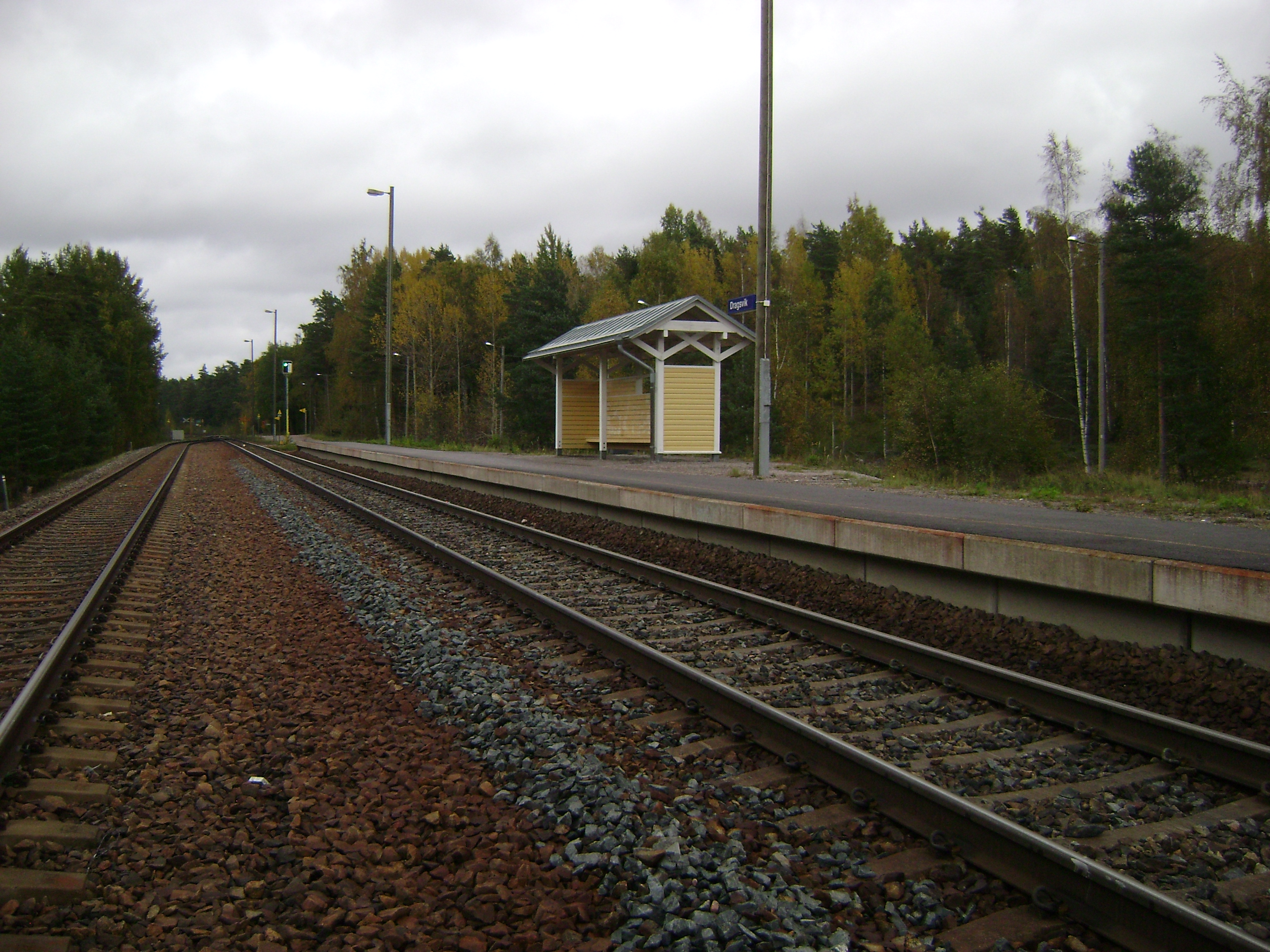

General information
- Location: Gamla Baggbyvägen, 10640; Dragsvik, Raseborg; Finland
- Coordinates: 59°59′25.8″N 023°29′24″E
- System: VR station
- Owner: Finnish Transport Infrastructure Agency
- Line: Karis–Hanko railway
- Platforms: 1 side platform
- Tracks: 1 with a platform 2 total (passing loop)
- Train operators: VR

Other information
- Station code: Dra
- Classification: Operating point

History
- Opened: 1 April 1933

Passengers
- 2008: 4,000

Services
Preceding station	VR commuter rail	Following station
Karis towards Karis or Helsinki	H	Ekenäs towards Hanko
Location
- Location within Uusimaa Location within Finland

The Dragsvik railway station (Swedish: Dragsviks järnvägsstation, Finnish: Dragsvikin rautatieasema) is located in Raseborg, Finland, in the village of Dragsvik. It is located along the Karis–Hanko railway, and its neighboring stations are Ekenäs in the west and Karis in the east.

== Services ==
Dragsvik is served by H commuter trains on the Karis–Hanko line.
