= Hanko Northern railway station =

Railway station in Hanko, Finland

Hanko Northern Hanko-Pohjoinen Hangö Norra
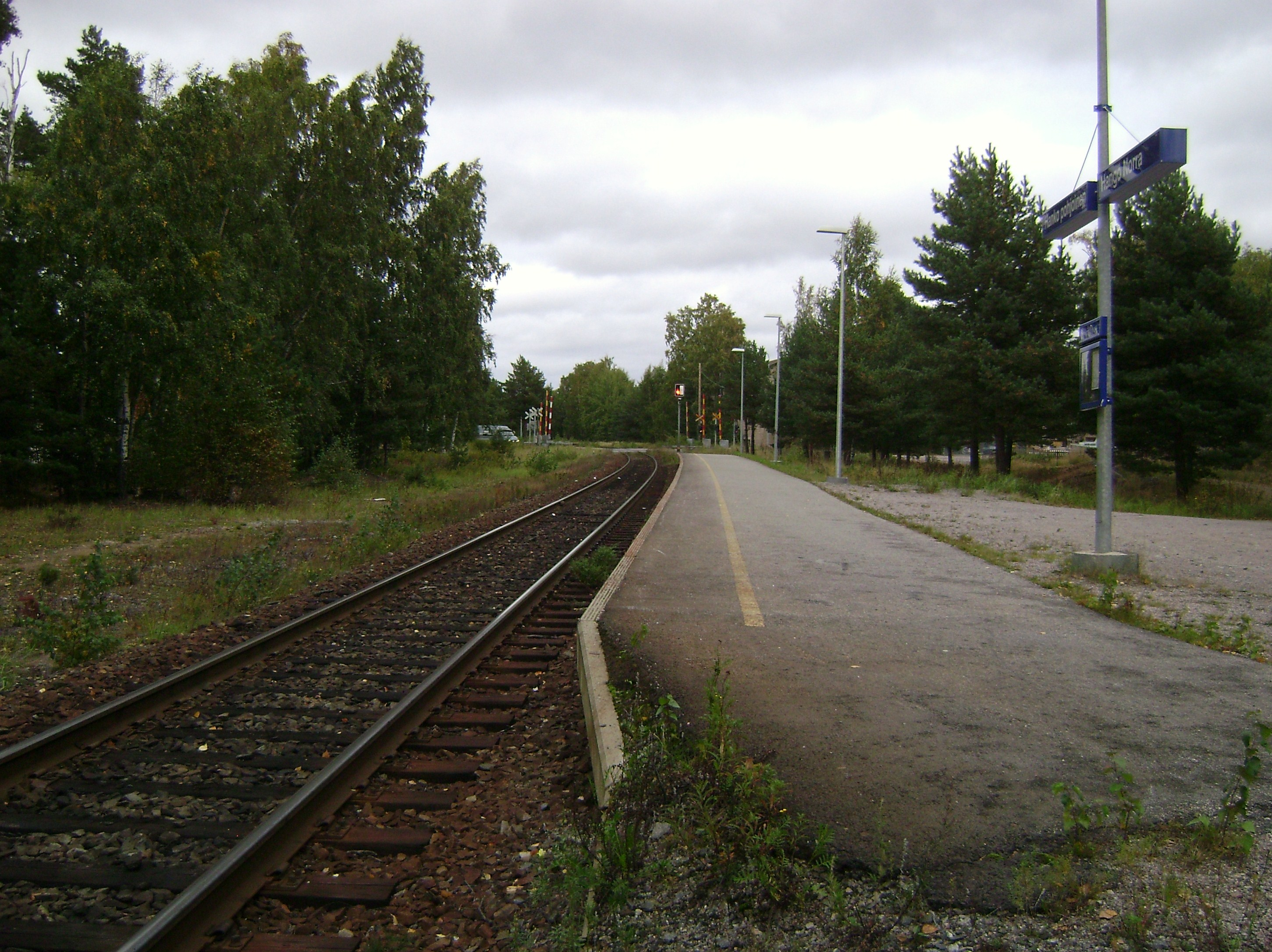

General information
- Location: Appelgrenintie, 10960; Hanko Pohjoinen, Hanko; Finland
- Coordinates: 59°49′47″N 022°59′17″E
- System: VR station
- Owner: Finnish Transport Infrastructure Agency
- Line: Karis–Hanko railway
- Platforms: 1 side platform
- Tracks: 1
- Train operators: VR (commuter trains)

Other information
- Station code: Hkp
- Classification: Part of split operating point (Hanko)

History
- Opened: 1 June 1920

Passengers
- 2008: 3,000

Services
Preceding station	VR commuter rail	Following station
Santala towards Karis or Helsinki	H	Hanko Terminus
Location
- Location within Uusimaa Location within Finland

Hanko Northern railway station (abbrev. Hkp, Finnish: Hanko-Pohjoisen seisake and Swedish: Hangö Norra) is a railway stop in the port town of Hanko, Finland along the Hanko-Hyvinkää Railroad. The stop is located approximately 1 kilometre (0.6 mi) north of the terminus, Hanko railway station and is situated next to a level crossing on Finnish national road 25 at one end of the Hanko railway yard.

== History ==
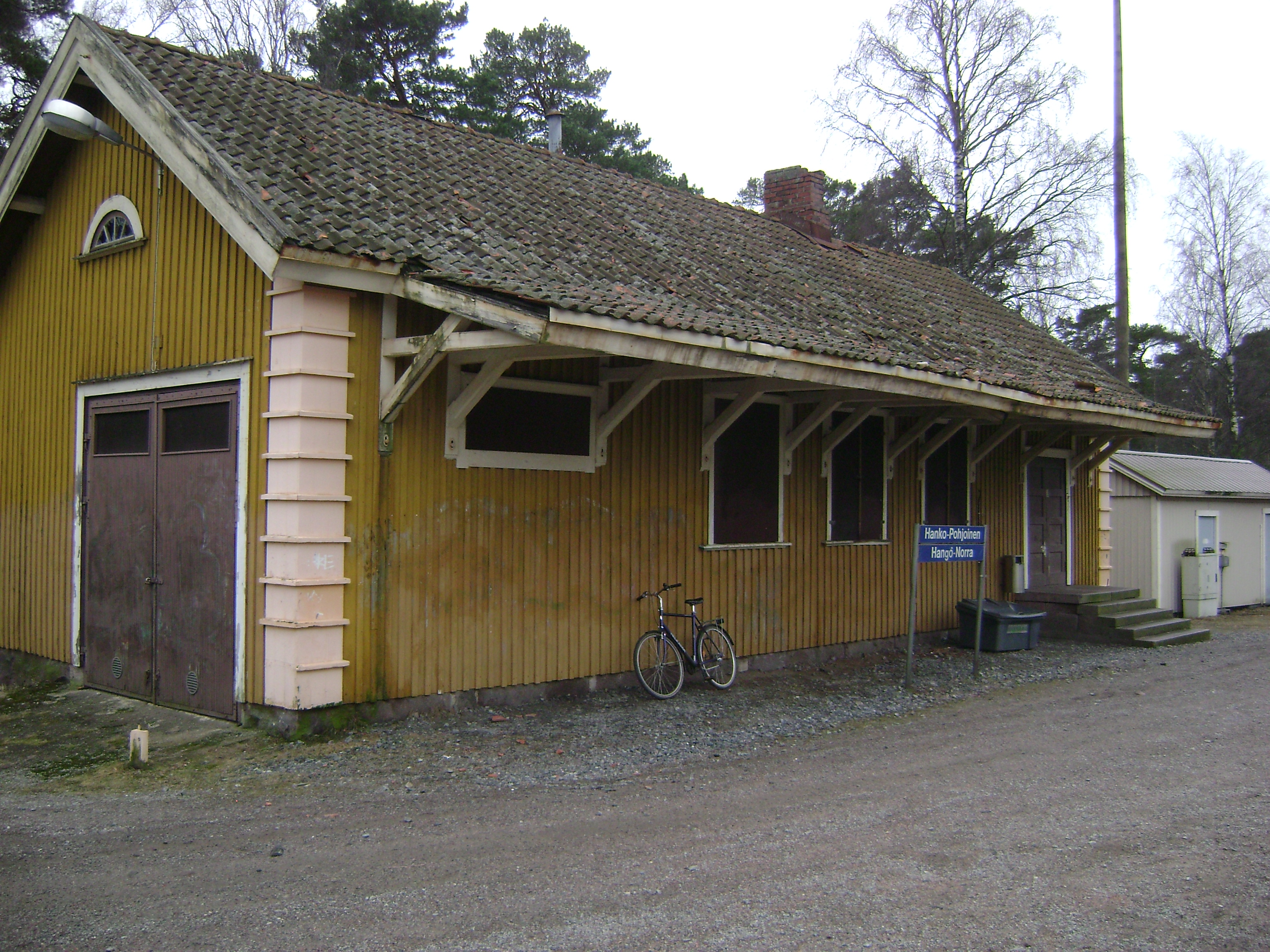
The former Hanko Northern station building.

When the railway line between Hanko and Hyvinkää was completed in 1873, industrial plants started to be established outside the town centre of Hanko by the railway line, starting with a sawmill and a carpentry factory in 1883, which received a freight station (known as vaihde in the old classification of railway stations in Finland used until 1969). This was followed by a cookie factory in 1910 and a margarine factory in 1912. The sawmill was turned into a box factory in the 1920's.

A small railway stop for passengers was opened at the freight station of the sawmill, originally named Meijeri ("Dairy") until 1910. A Plattformskjul-type station building, designed by architect Bruno Granholm, was also built at the stop. In 1920, another stop named Hangon vaihde was opened a kilometre closer to the Hanko main station. In 1931, the station was renamed Hanko Northern.

When the Hanko Peninsula was leased to the Soviet Union in 1940–1941, the railyard of Hanko Northern was modified to serve the needs of the Soviets. A railway track for cannons was built from the station to Tvärminne, near Lappohja. The track was used during the Continuation War and dismantled in 1945.

Hanko Northern became an unstaffed station at the start of 1953 but was made staffed again shortly thereafter to operate the railway crossing by the station. The freight station built for the sawmill was moved to the other side of the passenger station in 1957 and eventually torn down in 1990. Since 2007, Hanko Northern has been a part of the split operating point of Hanko. The station building was destroyed in a fire in 2011.

== Services ==
The station is served by the H commuter trains on the Karis–Hanko line.
