= Siuntio railway station =

Railway station in Siuntio, Finland

Siuntio Sjundeå
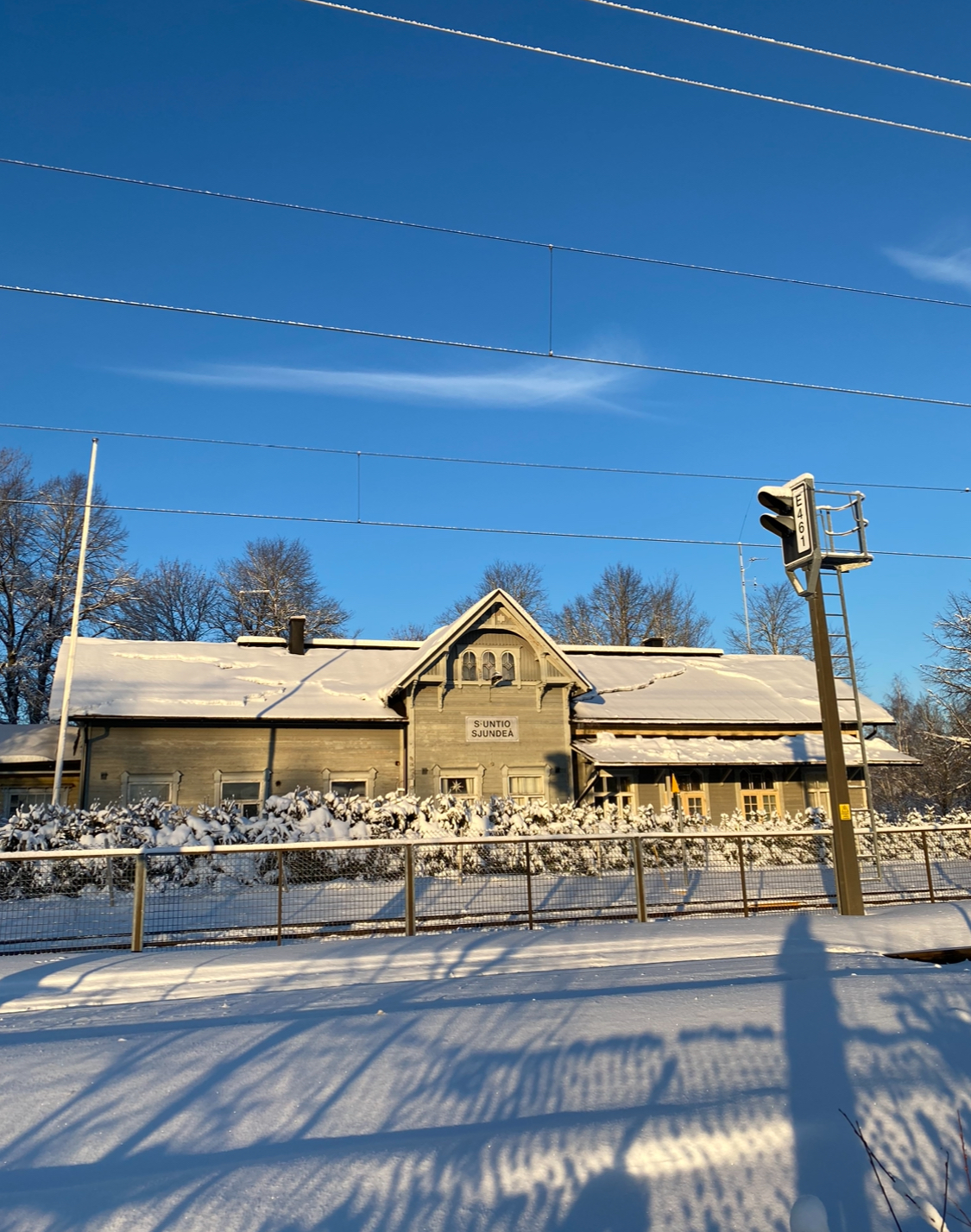
- Siuntio Railway Station in January 2024.

General information
- Location: Ratapihantie, 02580; Siuntion asemanseutu, Siuntio; Finland
- Coordinates: 60°08′27″N 24°13′21″E
- System: Helsinki commuter rail station
- Owner: Finnish Transport Infrastructure Agency
- Line: Helsinki–Turku
- Platforms: 2 side platforms
- Tracks: 2
- Train operators: VR on behalf of HSL

Construction
- Structure type: ground station
- Parking: 50
- Cycle facilities: 10 parking spaces

Other information
- Station code: Sti
- Fare zone: D
- Classification: Operating point

History
- Opened: 1899

Passengers
- 2019: 99,122

Services
Preceding station	Helsinki commuter rail	Following station
Kirkkonummi towards Helsinki	Y	Terminus
Preceding station	VR commuter rail	Following station
Kirkkonummi towards Helsinki	H Limited service	Ingå towards Hanko
Location

Siuntio railway station (Finnish: Siuntion rautatieasema, Swedish: Sjundeå järnvägsstation) is a railway station in the municipality of Siuntio, Finland, between the stations of Kirkkonummi and Ingå.

== History ==
The Sjundeå station was opened for traffic on 1 September 1903, and its station building, designed by Bruno Granholm, was finished in the same year. The station had its Finnish name officialized in June 1925.

The station was on the area of the territory of the Soviet Porkkala Naval Base, established as a result of the Moscow Armistice in 1944. As Porkkala was returned to Finnish control in 1956, Siuntio was re-established first as a halt on 1 May 1956; it was upgraded to a staffed laiturivaihde — a halt with a railyard with at least one switch — just one month later after the renovation of the station building was completed.

== Services ==
Siuntio is served by line Y on the Helsinki commuter rail network, for which it is one of the termini along with Helsinki. Some individual U and L trains also serve Siuntio. In addition, the H train runs between Hanko and Helsinki three times a week. The station is part of HSL fare zone D. The station has 55 centimetres (22 in) high platforms for accessible entry to low-floor trains, and park and ride services are provided on the south side of the railway in a car park on Ratapihantie, with capacity for approximately 50 cars and 10 bikes.

== Departure tracks ==
Siuntio railway station has two platform tracks.

- Track 1 is only used by the H train, both to Hanko and Helsinki.
- Track 2 is used by Y and L trains to Helsinki.

== See also ==
- Railway lines in Finland
