= SGY =

SGY, Sgy or sgy may refer to:

- Sanglechi language (ISO 639-3: sgy), an Iranian language spoken in villages in the Zebak District of Afghanistan
- Skagway Airport (IATA and FAA LID: SGY), a state-owned public-use airport in the city of Skagway, Alaska, United States
- Skogby railway station (Station code: Sgy), a railway station in Raseborg, Finland
