= Santala =

Santala may refer to:

- Jukka Santala (born 1985), Finnish football striker
- Tommi Santala (born 1979), Finnish ice hockey player
- Santala railway station in Hanko, Finland
