= Ingå railway station =

Railway station in Ingå, Finland

Ingå Inkoo
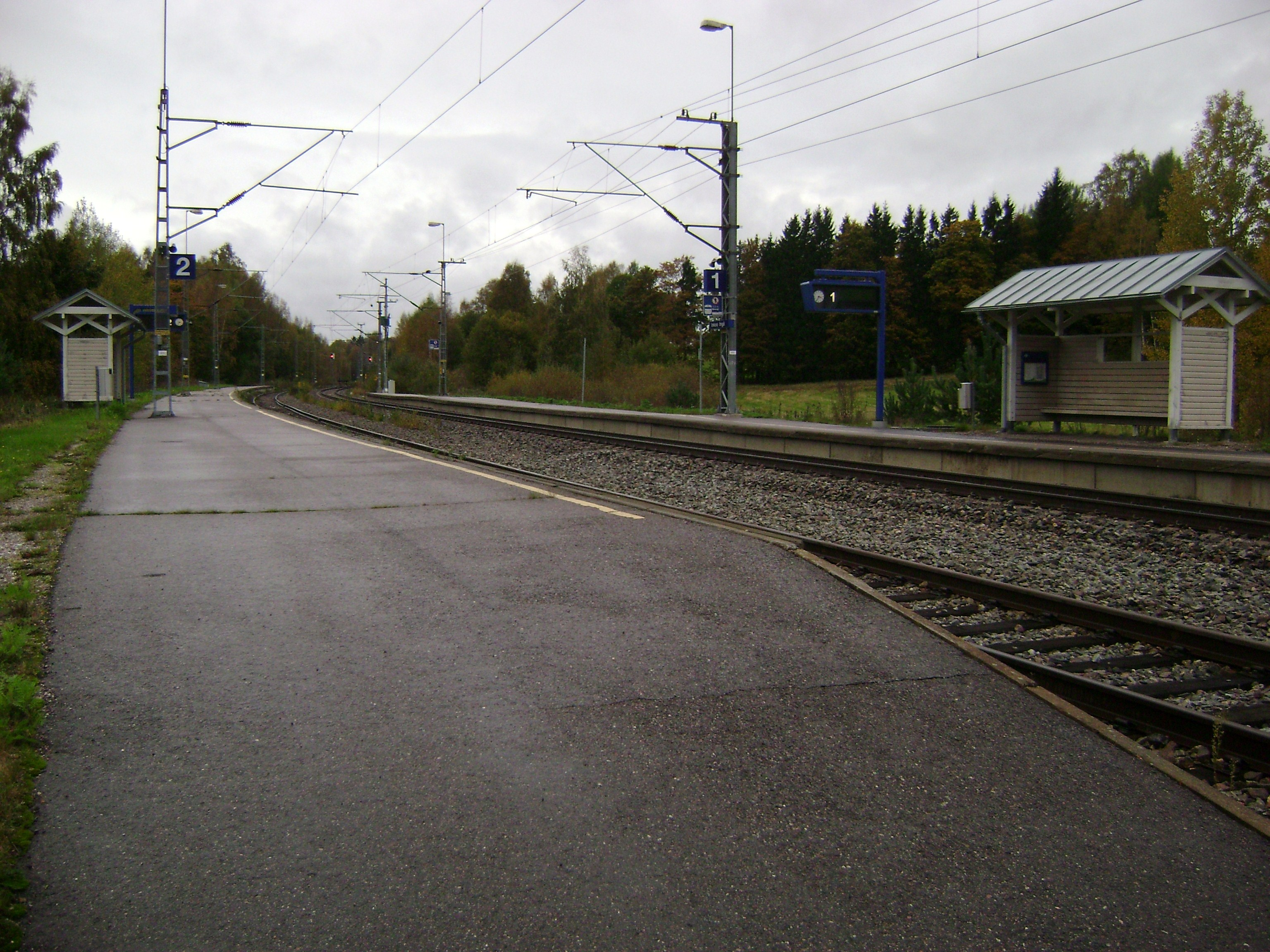
- Shelters are provided on the platforms

General information
- Coordinates: 60°03′41″N 023°56′19″E
- System: VR station
- Owner: Finnish Transport Agency
- Platforms: 2
- Tracks: 2

Construction
- Accessible: Yes

Other information
- Station code: IKO

History
- Opened: 1 September 1903
- Electrified: 1993

Key dates
- 1903: Opened
- 1991: Freight traffic ended
- 2016: Passenger service (Y train) ended
- 2024: Passenger service (H train) restarted

Services
Preceding station	VR commuter rail	Following station
Siuntio towards Helsinki	H Limited service	Karis towards Hanko

Discontinued services
Preceding station	Helsinki commuter rail	Following station
Siuntio towards Helsinki	Y	Karis Terminus
Location

Ingå railway station (Swedish: Ingå järnvägsstation, Finnish: Inkoon rautatieasema) is a railway station in the municipality of Ingå, Finland, between the stations of Siuntio and Karis. It is located 19.3 kilometres (12.0 mi) west of the Siuntio station and 16 kilometres (9.9 mi) east of the Karis station. The station was designed by architect Bruno Granholm.

Due to very low number passenger numbers, the station was closed on 27 March 2016. The station was re-opened for passenger traffic on 3 April 2024. The station is served by a limited H commuter train service between Helsinki and Hanko, operating three times a week.

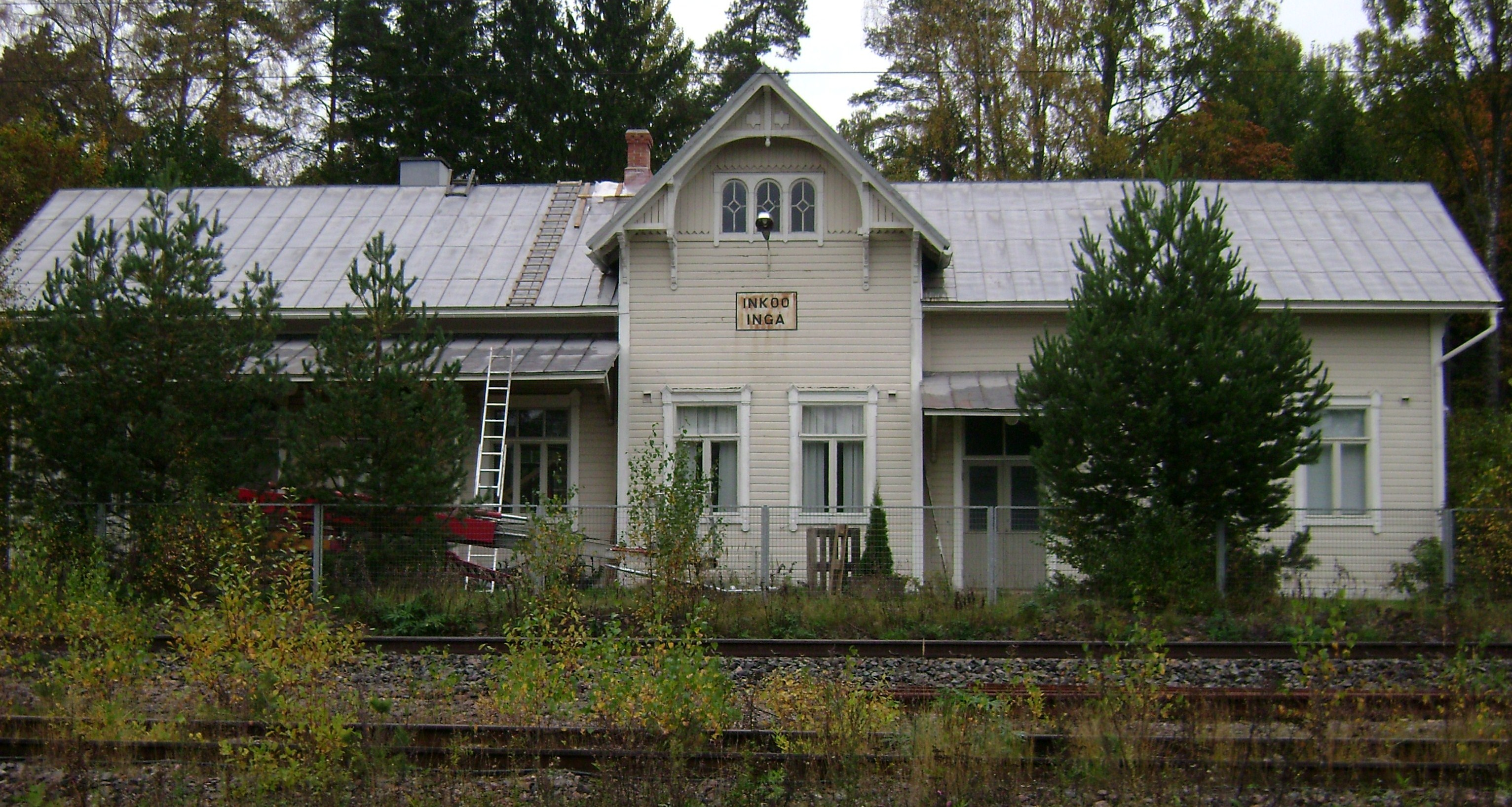
Old station building

== See also ==
- Railway lines in Finland
