= Lappohja =

Lappohja Lappohja – Lappvik
- Village
- Location in Finland
- Coordinates: 59°54′10″N 23°14′30″E
- Country: Finland
- Region: Uusimaa
- Municipality: Hanko

Area
  - Total: 1.99 km^{2} (0.77 sq mi)

Population (2016)
  - Total: 475
- Time zone: UTC+2 (EET)
  - Summer (DST): UTC+3 (EEST)

Lappohja (Swedish: Lappvik) is a village located in the municipality of Hanko. It has a population of about 475 (2016).

The Lappohja railway station is located along the Karis–Hanko railway.
