= Himachal Kranti Party =

Himachal Kranti Party (Himalayan Revolution Party), a political party in the Indian state of Himachal Pradesh. HKP was formed after the 1998 state assembly elections, when two Himachal Vikas Congress members of the assembly, Mansa Ram and Prakash Chaudhary, split to form HKP. HKP merged with Bharatiya Janata Party in 1999.

A party with the same name contested the 1993 state assembly elections.
