= Karis railway station =

Railway station in Uusimaa, Finland

Karis Karjaa
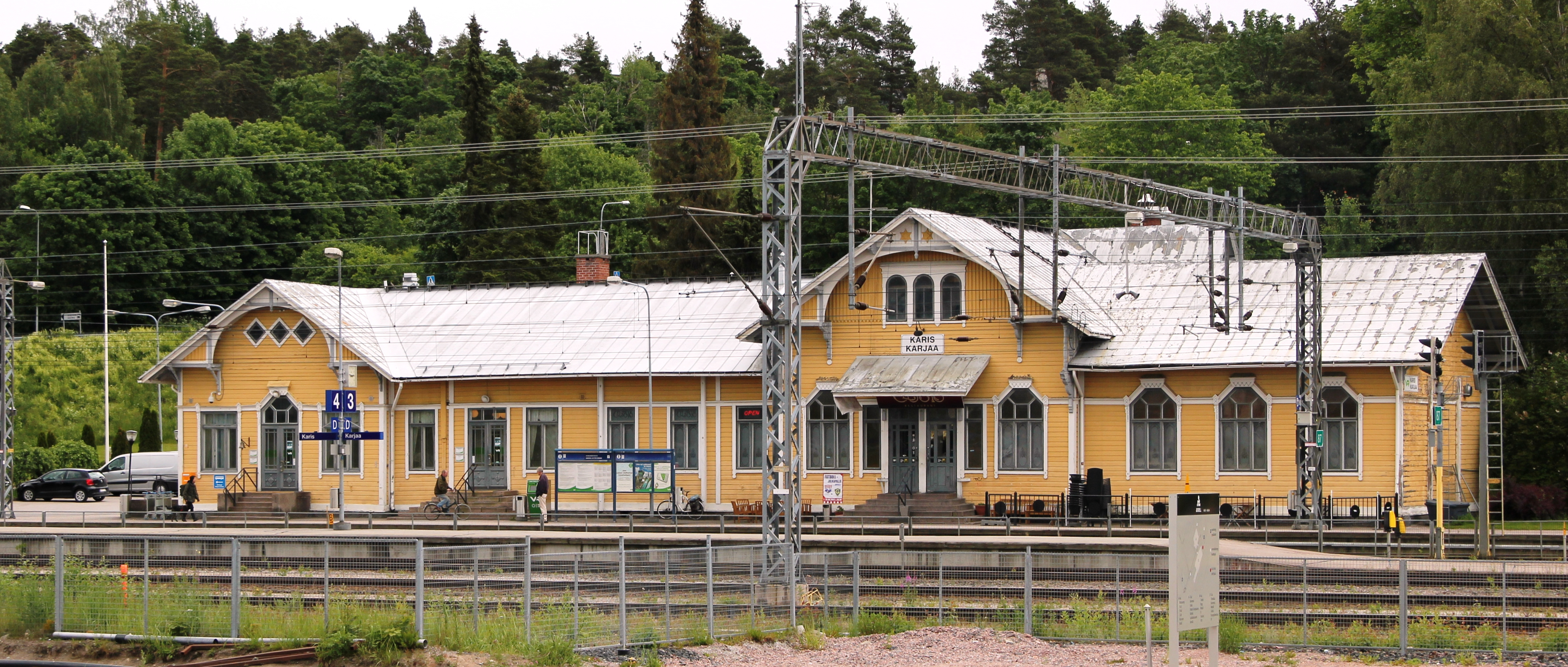

General information
- Location: Alingsåsgatan 37, 10300; Karis, Raseborg; Finland
- Coordinates: 60°04′07″N 23°39′41″E
- System: VR station
- Owner: Finnish Transport Agency
- Lines: Helsinki–Turku railway; Hanko–Hyvinkää railway
- Platforms: 3

Construction
- Structure type: ground station
- Accessible: 2

Services
Preceding station	VR Group	Following station
Kirkkonummi towards Helsinki	Helsinki–Turku	Salo towards Turku Harbour
Preceding station	VR commuter rail	Following station
Terminus	H	Dragsvik towards Hanko
Ingå towards Helsinki	H	Dragsvik towards Hanko

Discontinued services
Preceding station	Helsinki commuter rail	Following station
Ingå towards Helsinki	Y	Terminus
Location

The Karis railway station (Swedish: Karis järnvägsstation, Finnish: Karjaan rautatieasema) is a railway station in the town of Raseborg in the Uusimaa region, Finland. The station is located along the track between Helsinki and Turku, about 87 km west from Helsinki Central railway station and serves as a connection point between three different tracks: the main track between Helsinki and Turku, a branch track to the city of Hanko, and a former privately owned track between Karis and Hyvinkää, currently largely disused.

Nearly all long-distance trains between Helsinki and Turku stop at the Karis railway station. The station is also the northern terminus of Karis-Hanko commuter trains and used to be the westernmost terminus of Helsinki commuter rail (Y line) in 2002–2016, although the station was served by one Y line commuter train service to Helsinki at 5.44 in the morning (HL 8570) and an L line service from Helsinki arriving at 0.39 in the morning (HL 8525) until the municipality stopped purchasing them from HSL in June 2021, resulting in their withdrawal. The station also serves cargo traffic.

== History ==
The Karis railway station was founded to serve a privately owned track between Hanko and Hyvinkää, and taken into use in 1873. After a few years, the privately owned track had only made a loss, and the station was transferred over to the Finnish state.

The station became a crossing point in 1899, when the track between Karis and Turku was opened. The track between Karis and Pasila was opened in 1903.

== Departure tracks ==
There are four platform tracks at the Karis railway station used by the passenger trains.

- Track 1 is the departure track for Karis–Hanko H commuter trains.
- Track 2 is used by eastbound long-distance services towards Helsinki.
- Track 3 is used by westbound long-distance services towards Turku.
- Track 4 is used by one H train service to Hanko on Wednesday, Friday and Sunday.

== See also ==
- Railway lines in Finland
