= Hanko railway station =

Railway station in Hanko, Finland

Hanko Hangö
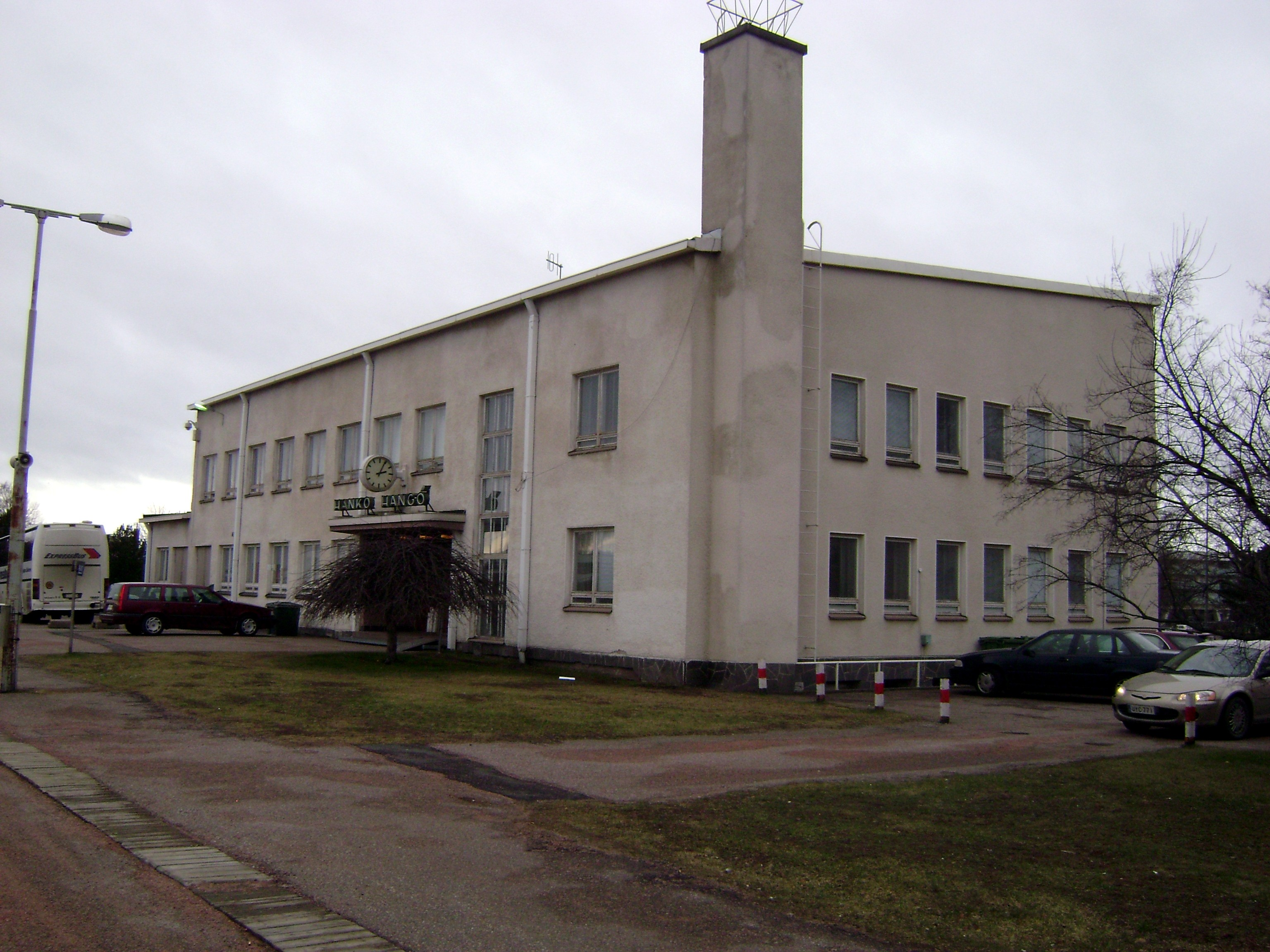

General information
- Other names: Hankoniemi (until 1925)
- Location: Asematori, 10900 Hanko
- System: VR station
- Owner: Finnish Transport Agency
- Platforms: 1

Construction
- Architect: Jarl Ungern
- Architectural style: Functionalism

History
- Opened: 1873

Services
Preceding station	VR commuter rail	Following station
Hanko Northern towards Karis or Helsinki	H	Terminus
Location

Hanko railway station (abbrev. Hnk, Finnish: Hangon rautatieasema, Swedish: Hangö järnvägsstation) is a railway station in the port town of Hanko, Finland along the Hanko–Hyvinkää railway. The station is located approximately 50 kilometres (30 mi) away from Karis railway station and is the terminus for the line. The Hanko railway station is the southernmost railway station in Finland.

The current station building represents the postfunctionalism of the 1950s. The building was completed in 1952 and it was designed by architect Jarl Ungern.

The Finnish Heritage Agency has classified Hanko railway station as a nationally significant built cultural environment.

== History ==
Hanko railway station was opened as the terminus of Hanko–Hyvinkää railway line opened in 1873, originally named Hankoniemi. A port was established in the location already the previous year and in 1874, the town of Hanko was founded. The original wooden station building, designed by architect Per Erik Svante Degenauer, was completed the same year as the railway line was opened. The Hanko–Hyvinkää line was originally a private railway, but was acquired by the State Railways of Finland already in 1875.

After being acquired by the State Railways, Hanko soon developed into a significant port town. A year-round steamship connection to Stockholm began in 1876 and in the next decade there were year-round ship connection also to Copenhagen, Lübeck, and Hull, England. Immigrants to America also travelled via Hanko, making the Port of Hanko the most significant departure port for Finnish immigrants. A hotel for immigrants was established in Hanko in 1902. The sandbeaches and sunny weathers also brought in more travellers to Hanko and a spa was established there in 1879.

The Hanko Peninsula was leased to the Soviet Union in 1940–1941 and passenger traffic to the town ceased during the period. The original station building and the warehouse were destroyed in December 1941, as Finland reclaimed the peninsula. Passenger traffic to Hanko was re-started in February 1942. The current functionalist style station building designed by Jarl Ungern was built in 1949–1952. A new freight station was completed in 1949 and was similar to the freight station in Rovaniemi. A train ferry port was completed in 1975 and served train ferry traffic until 1998, when train ferry traffic was moved to Turku. The ticket sales office at the station was closed in 2008.

The station building was purchased by Oy Chyde Invest Ab in 2021, which plans to use the building for accommodation, meetings and exhibitions as well as to open a restaurant there.
