= Hanko–Hyvinkää railway =

Railway in southern Finland

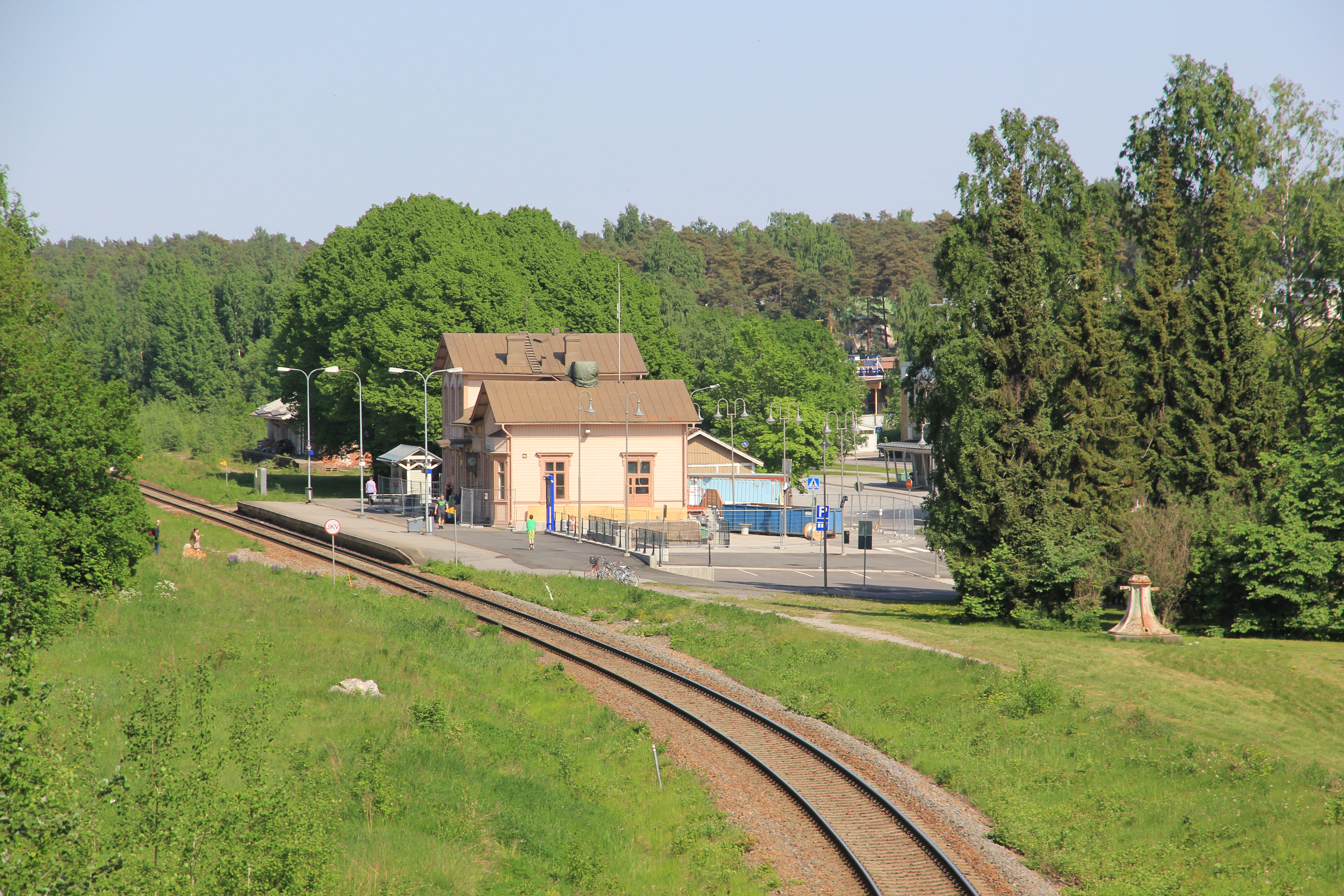
- Ekenäs railway station in 2013, before the line was electrified

Overview
- Locale: Finland
- Dates of operation: 1872–

Technical
- Track gauge: 1,524 mm (5 ft); Russian gauge
- Length: 149 kilometres (93 mi)

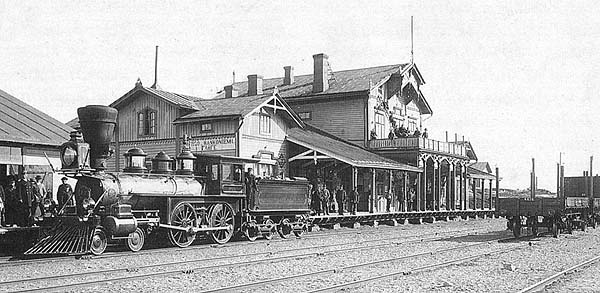
The station building in Hanko in 1893

The Hanko–Hyvinkää railway (Swedish: Hangö–Hyvinge järnväg) is a 149 km (93 mi) railway line in southern Finland. When originally built, it was Finland's first privately funded railway.

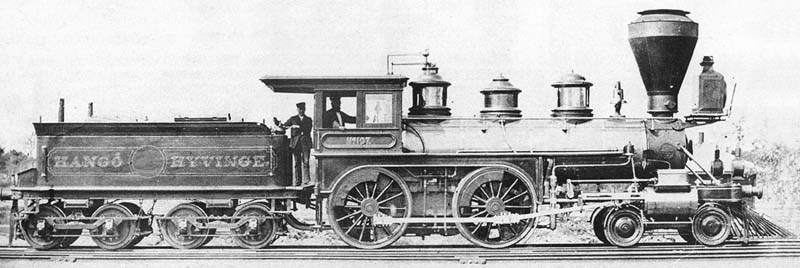
The Baldwin locomotive type used on the Hanko–Hyvinkää Railroad

== History ==
Hanko is the southernmost town in Finland. Hanko has a seaport which, thanks to its location, can be used for the longest possible time during the sometimes very severe, and freezing, Finnish winters. Because all the other Finnish seaports might be frozen solid during the winter, there was an anticipation for a large amount freight transit traffic. As such, a decision was made to privately fund the 149 kilometres (93 mi) railway from Hanko to the Finnish State Railways' Helsinki–Hämeenlinna line, with the connection at Hyvinkää.

Work on the new railway began in 1872 with the inaugural run being on October 8, 1873. Owing to insufficient funds, the private company soon got into financial trouble. Facing almost certain liquidation, the railroad company was sold to the Finnish State Railways in 1875. Today, the Finnish Railway Museum is based at the site of the original roundhouse and Hyvinkää railway station buildings in the town of Hyvinkää.

As the first private railway company in Finland, the railroad company obtained nine "American style" Baldwin 4-4-0 steam locomotives, in addition to four engines of European manufacture.

The line was electrified between 2021 and 2024.

== Current services ==
The Finnish state railway company VR Group currently operates passenger services between Hanko and Karis, with connections to long-distance services from Karis to Helsinki Central Station. However, the section between Karis and Hyvinkää is freight-only.

== See also ==
- History of rail transport in Finland
- Finnish Railway Museum
- List of Finnish locomotives
