= Einari Merikallio =

Finnish ornithologist

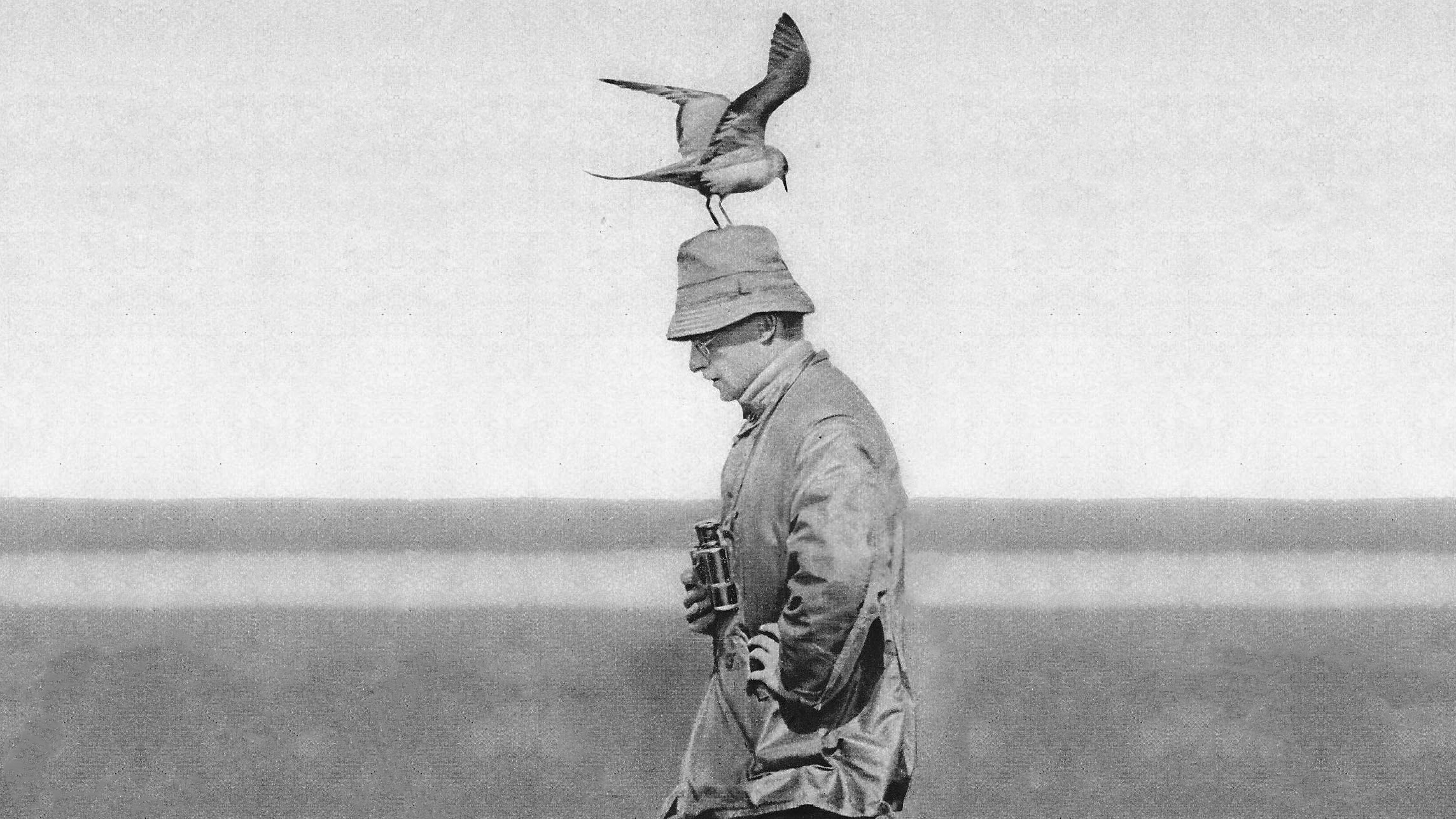

Einari Fredrik Merikallio or Einari Fredrik Hellman until 1906 (February 29, 1888 – January 8, 1961) was a Finnish ornithologist and teacher. He pioneered the quantitative estimation of bird populations in Finland carrying out on foot 2537 km of line transects.

== Life and work ==
Merikallio was born in Oulu to Edla Erika Åhlberg and Alski Hellman who was a granary manager. After studies at the Finnish Lyceum he went to the University of Helsinki, receiving an MSc in 1912. He studied the birds of the Bay of Bothnia. He then taught biology at Riihimäki, Helsinki and later at Kerava where he became a headmaster in 1925. He also took an interest in gymnastics and had been chosen to represent Finland in the London olympics of 1908 but studies prevented him from participating. He also sang in a choir and maintained Finnish dog breeds. He became a co-editor of the journal Ornis Fennica in 1924. He photographed birds and began to study breeding sea birds across the region, starting first to estimate bird populations at Krunnit. He dropped subjective terms like "abundant", "fairly abundant" for actual numerical estimates. He used the line transect from 1916. Making use of a 40 m wide transects he extended his work and began to cover the whole of Finland from 1941 to 1956. His results were part of his 1946 PhD thesis.
