= Oulu =

City in North Ostrobothnia, Finland

Oulu Uleåborg (Swedish)
- City
- Oulun kaupunki Uleåborgs stad City of Oulu
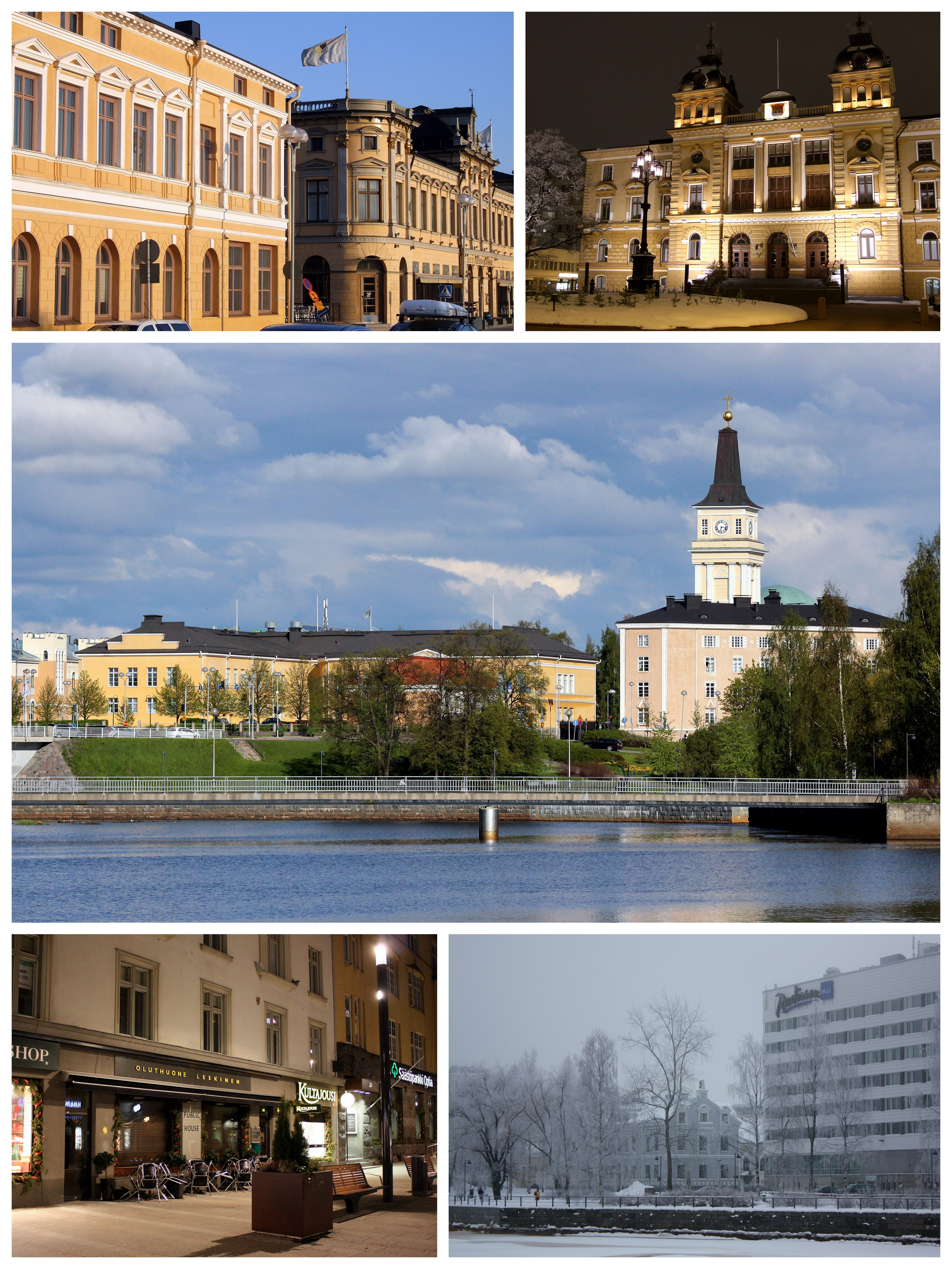
- From top, left to right: Rantakatu in downtown Oulu; Oulu City Hall; Lyseo Upper Secondary School and the Oulu Cathedral; Shops along Kirkkokatu; Radisson Blu Hotel along Ojakatu

- Flag Coat of arms
- Nicknames: Capital of Northern Finland; Capital of Northern Scandinavia
- Location of Oulu in Finland
- Interactive map of Oulu
- Coordinates: 65°00′51″N 25°28′19″E
- Country: Finland
- Region: North Ostrobothnia
- Sub-region: Oulu sub-region
- Charter: April 8, 1605; 421 years ago

Government
  - City manager: Ari Alatossava

Area (2018-01-01)
  - City: 3,817.52 km^{2} (1,473.95 sq mi)
  - Land: 2,972.44 km^{2} (1,147.67 sq mi)
  - Water: 103.2 km^{2} (39.8 sq mi)
  - Urban: 187.1 km^{2} (72.2 sq mi)
  - Rank: 17th largest in Finland

Population (2025-12-31)
  - City: 217,469
  - Rank: 5th largest in Finland
  - Density: 73.16/km^{2} (189.5/sq mi)
  - Urban: 208 939
  - Urban density: 915.8/km^{2} (2,372/sq mi)
  - Metro: 265 454
- Demonym: oululainen (Finnish)

Population by native language
  - Finnish: 92.8% (official)
  - Swedish: 0.2%
  - Sami: 0.1%
  - Others: 6.9%

Population by age
  - 0 to 14: 17.4%
  - 15 to 64: 66%
  - 65 or older: 16.6%
- Time zone: UTC+02:00 (EET)
  - Summer (DST): UTC+03:00 (EEST)
- Website: www.ouka.fi

Oulu (/ˈoʊluː/ OH-loo, Finnish: [ˈou̯lu]; Swedish: Uleåborg [ʉːlɛɔˈbɔrj]) is a major port city in Finland and the regional capital of North Ostrobothnia. It is located on the north-western coast of the country, at the mouth of the River Oulu. The population of Oulu is approximately 217,000, while the sub-region has a population of approximately 265,000. It is the 5th most populous municipality in Finland, and the fourth most populous urban area in the country. Oulu is also the most populous city in Northern Finland.

Oulu's neighbouring municipalities are: Hailuoto, Ii, Kempele, Liminka, Lumijoki, Muhos, Pudasjärvi, Tyrnävä and Utajärvi. Oulu is the third northernmost city in the world with a population of over 100,000, after Murmansk and Norilsk in Russia.

Due to its large population and geopolitical, economic and cultural-historical position, Oulu has been called the "capital of Northern Finland". Oulu is also considered one of Europe's "living labs", where residents experiment with new technologies (such as NFC tags and ubi-screens) on a community-wide scale. Although only in the top 2% of universities, the University of Oulu is regionally renowned in the field of information technology. Oulu has also been very successful in recent city image surveys; in a study published by the Finnish Economic Survey in 2008, Oulu received the best image rating among large cities in the country, including ratings from respondents in all provinces. In the 2023 T-Media survey, Oulu was tied with Kuopio as the second most attractive city in Finland, while Tampere was ranked first. In 2025, Oulu had the cleanest air quality among all European cities according to European Environment Agency (EEA).

Once known for wood tar and salmon, Oulu has become a major high-tech centre, particularly in IT and wellness technology. In 2024, Oulu placed third in the European Commission’s Capital of Innovation Awards (iCapital) in the Rising Innovative Cities category. Other important industries include wood processing, chemicals, pharmaceuticals, paper and steel.

Oulu has been selected as the European Capital of Culture for 2026 together with Trenčín, Slovakia.

== Etymology ==
The city is named after the river Oulujoki, which originates in the lake Oulujärvi. There have been a number of other theories for the origin of the name Oulu. One possible source is a word in the Sami language meaning 'flood water', but there are other suggestions. At minimum, the structure of the word requires that, if originally given by speakers of a Uralic language, the name must be a derivative. In all likelihood, it also predates Finnish settlement and is thus a loanword from one of the now-extinct Saami languages once spoken in the area.

The most probable theory is that the name derives from the Finnish dialectal word oulu, meaning "floodwater", which is related to e.g. Southern Sami åulo, meaning "melted snow", åulot meaning "thaw" (of unknown ultimate origin). Two other word families have also been speculated to be related. The first is seen in the Northern Savo dialectal word uula and its Sami counterpart oalli, both meaning "river channel". The second is the Uralic root reconstructed as *uwa, meaning "river bed" (reflected in modern Finnish vuo "flow", and its derivatives, such as vuolas "heavy-flowing"). To either of these roots, some Sami variety would have to be assumed having added further derivational suffixes.

== History ==
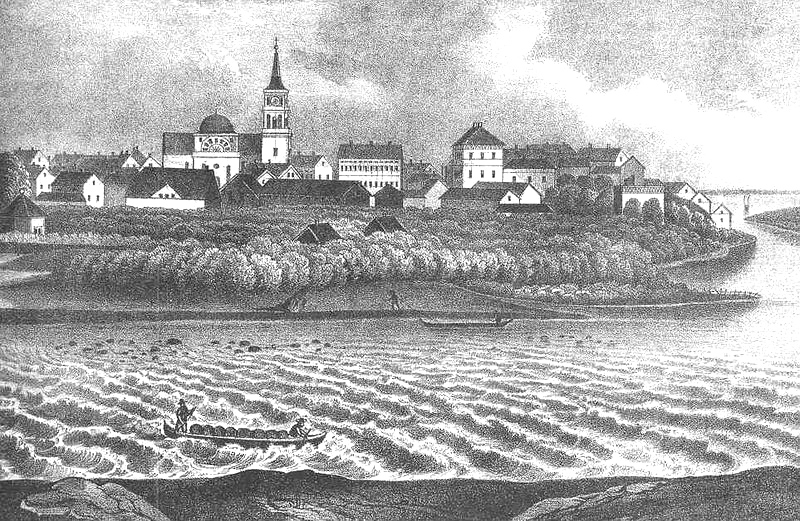
Drawing of central Oulu from the 19th century

Oulu is situated by the Gulf of Bothnia, at the mouth of river Oulujoki, which was an official trading centre.

Following the Treaty of Nöteborg in 1323, the status of Oulu was disputed in its ownership, as both the Novgorod Republic and the Kingdom of Sweden held much influence. In 1345, the Swedish annexed territory up to the Kemi River for the Diocese of Turku. In 1375, the Novgorodians built a defensive castle which was later captured by the Swedish forces in 1377.

The 1400s were characterized by Russian raids in the region, during these raids captured people would be killed and/or taken back to the region of Russia. In 1531, the city was granted permission to act as a trading post. In 1590, the Oulu Castle was built by the Swedes and in 1595, the Treaty of Teusina firmly established Sweden's control over Oulu.

The city was founded on 8 April 1605 by King Charles IX of Sweden, and granted city privileges in 1610. In 1765, Oulu received township rights granting them to trade outside of Sweden. Oulu was the capital of the Province of Oulu from 1776 to 2009.

In 1822, a major fire destroyed much of the city, especially the city centre as most of the city was made from wood. The architect Carl Ludvig Engel, chiefly known for the neoclassical (empire style) buildings around Helsinki Senate Square, was enlisted to provide the plan for its rebuilding. With minor changes, this plan remains the basis for the layout of Oulu's town center. The Oulu Cathedral was built in 1832 to his designs, with the spire being finished in 1844. During the Åland War, part of the Crimean War, Oulu's harbour was raided by the British fleet, who destroyed ships and burned tar houses, leading to international criticism.

The city was the site of the Battle of Oulu on 3 February 1918 between the Whites and the Reds during the Finnish Civil War.

== Geography ==
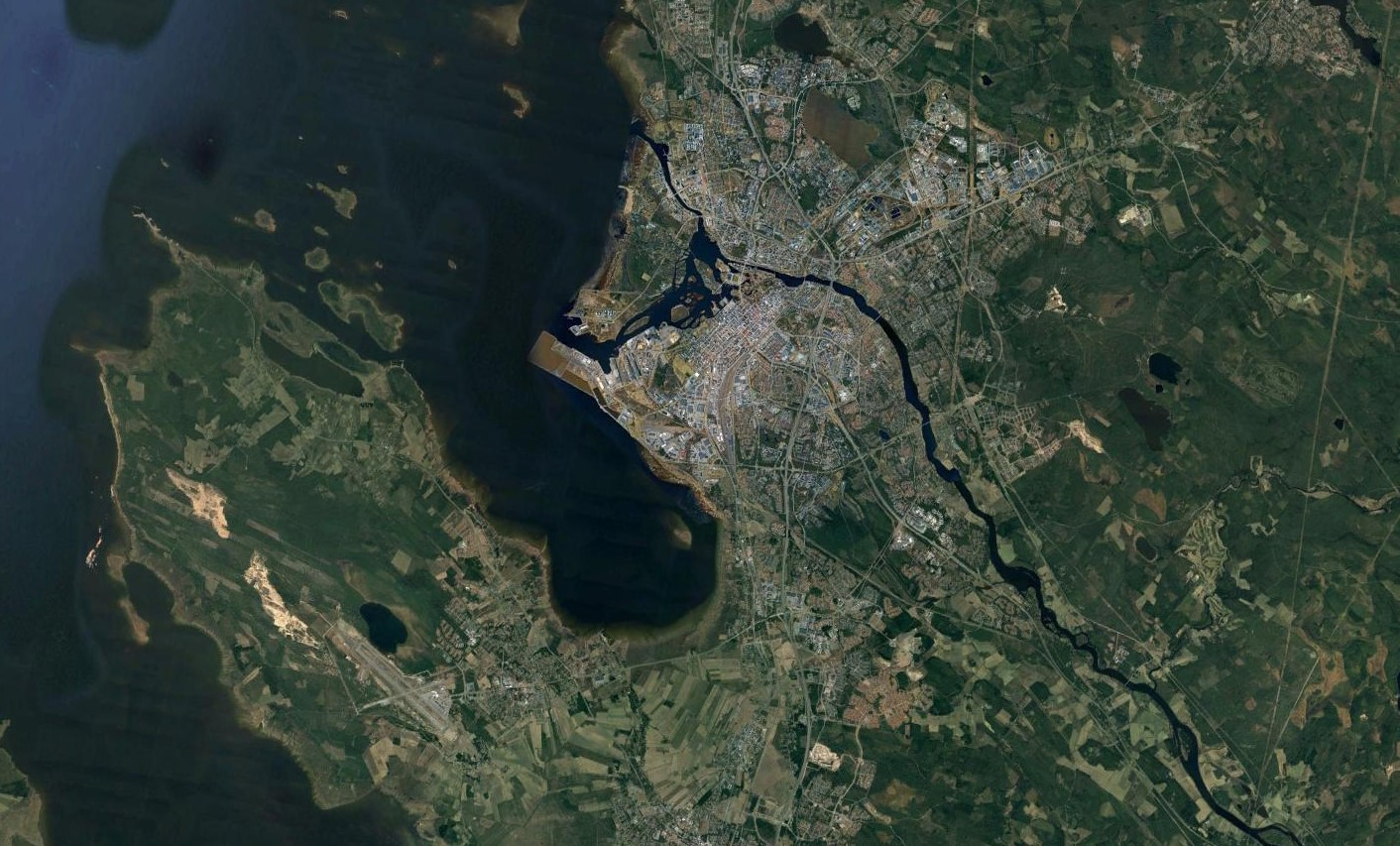
Satellite image of the Oulu region.

Oulu is located in northern Finland, a considerable distance from the other major cities in the country. It is located 607 kilometres (377 mi) north of the capital city Helsinki. Mainland Finland's northernmost and southernmost points are roughly equidistant from Oulu.

Oulu's coast sits at the Bothnian Bay (Perämeri in Finnish) and the Swedish mainland is about 180 km directly west across the Bothnian Bay. From the center of Oulu in the direction of Oulunsalo, there is Kempeleenlahti, a smaller but wide, meadow-belted bay, and part of it has been listed as a nature conservation area. The nearby island Hailuoto is just off the coast, 53 kilometres (33 mi) away in the Bothnian Bay. Along the coast to the southwest, about 75 kilometres (47 mi) of Oulu is Raahe (Brahestad), known for its historic wooden town, and, further to the southwest, about 130 kilometres (81 mi) of Oulu is Kalajoki, known for its popular sandy beaches.

=== Subdivisions ===
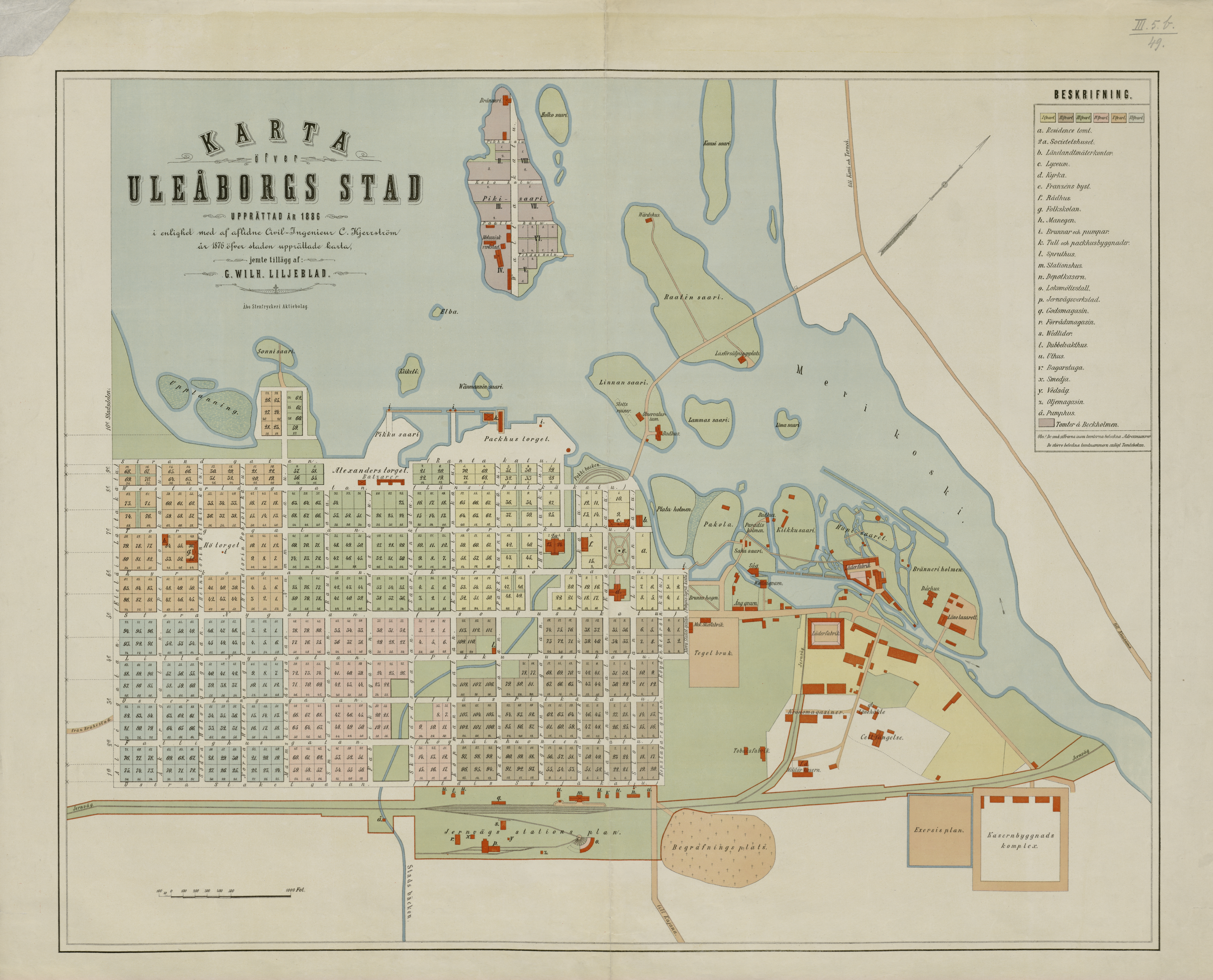
The map of Oulu from 1886.

Oulu is divided into 106 city districts. The largest of these are Haukipudas, Oulunsalo, Kaakkuri, Ritaharju, Tuira, and Kello.

The municipality of Ylikiiminki was merged with the city of Oulu on 1 January 2009. Oulu and the municipalities of Haukipudas, Kiiminki, Oulunsalo, and Yli-Ii were merged on 1 January 2013.

=== Climate ===
Oulu has a subarctic climate (Köppen: Dfc, Trewartha Eolo), bordering a humid continental climate (Köppen: Dfb, Trewartha Dclo). It is the largest Finnish city entirely in this climatic zone as well as one of the largest such in the world. The typical features are cold and snowy winters with short and mild summers. Average annual temperature is 3.3 °C (37.9 °F). The average annual precipitation is 477 mm (18.78 in) falling 105 days per year, mostly in late summer and fall. The warmest temperature ever recorded in Oulu was 33.3 °C (91.9 °F) in July 1957, while the coldest temperature on record was −41.5 °C (−42.7 °F) in February 1966.

Due to Oulu's far northern location, and its frequent overcast skies, it only sees on average 15 minutes of sunshine per day in December. During the winter solstice days only last 3 hours and 34 minutes with the sun rising 1.9 degrees over the horizon. On the other hand, during the summer solstice days last 22 hours and 3 minutes, with the sun dipping 1 degree below the horizon. This gives Oulu white nights during the summer.

Climate data for Oulu, 1991–2020 normals, records 1921–present
Month	Jan	Feb	Mar	Apr	May	Jun	Jul	Aug	Sep	Oct	Nov	Dec	Year
Record high °C (°F)	9.3 (48.7)	7.8 (46.0)	11.5 (52.7)	23.9 (75.0)	29.9 (85.8)	32.3 (90.1)	33.3 (91.9)	30.5 (86.9)	25.4 (77.7)	21.1 (70.0)	11.2 (52.2)	8.2 (46.8)	33.3 (91.9)
Mean maximum °C (°F)	3.3 (37.9)	3.3 (37.9)	6.2 (43.2)	14.9 (58.8)	22.4 (72.3)	25.9 (78.6)	27.8 (82.0)	26.0 (78.8)	20.2 (68.4)	12.5 (54.5)	6.7 (44.1)	4.3 (39.7)	29.0 (84.2)
Mean daily maximum °C (°F)	−4.8 (23.4)	−4.7 (23.5)	−0.4 (31.3)	5.8 (42.4)	12.6 (54.7)	17.9 (64.2)	21.1 (70.0)	18.9 (66.0)	13.2 (55.8)	5.8 (42.4)	0.5 (32.9)	−2.7 (27.1)	6.9 (44.5)
Daily mean °C (°F)	−8.2 (17.2)	−8.4 (16.9)	−4.4 (24.1)	1.6 (34.9)	8.0 (46.4)	13.7 (56.7)	16.7 (62.1)	14.6 (58.3)	9.6 (49.3)	3.3 (37.9)	−1.6 (29.1)	−5.3 (22.5)	3.3 (38.0)
Mean daily minimum °C (°F)	−11.9 (10.6)	−12.1 (10.2)	−8.3 (17.1)	−2.5 (27.5)	3.4 (38.1)	9.3 (48.7)	12.4 (54.3)	10.6 (51.1)	6.0 (42.8)	0.6 (33.1)	−4.2 (24.4)	−8.8 (16.2)	−0.5 (31.2)
Mean minimum °C (°F)	−26.2 (−15.2)	−26.0 (−14.8)	−20.4 (−4.7)	−11.1 (12.0)	−3.0 (26.6)	3.0 (37.4)	7.3 (45.1)	3.8 (38.8)	−1.9 (28.6)	−9.6 (14.7)	−16.1 (3.0)	−22.7 (−8.9)	−29.0 (−20.2)
Record low °C (°F)	−37.5 (−35.5)	−41.5 (−42.7)	−32 (−26)	−21.4 (−6.5)	−9.1 (15.6)	−6.1 (21.0)	3.6 (38.5)	−1.5 (29.3)	−8.0 (17.6)	−20.6 (−5.1)	−33 (−27)	−37.2 (−35.0)	−41.5 (−42.7)
Average precipitation mm (inches)	32 (1.3)	29 (1.1)	26 (1.0)	23 (0.9)	40 (1.6)	51 (2.0)	80 (3.1)	62 (2.4)	49 (1.9)	51 (2.0)	43 (1.7)	39 (1.5)	525 (20.5)
Average snowfall cm (inches)	33 (13)	46 (18)	43 (17)	7 (2.8)	—	—	—	—	—	—	4 (1.6)	17 (6.7)	150 (59)
Average precipitation days	9	8	7	6	8	8	10	10	8	10	10	10	104
Average relative humidity (%) (daily average)	87	86	82	73	67	66	71	76	82	86	90	89	80
Mean monthly sunshine hours	24	69	137	208	273	296	283	212	133	69	28	8	1,740
Average ultraviolet index	0	0	1	2	3	4	4	3	2	1	0	0	2
Source 1: FMI
Source 2: FMI (record highs and lows 1921–1961) FMI (record highs and lows 1961–present) Source 3: weather2travel.com (average monthly UV index)

== City centre ==
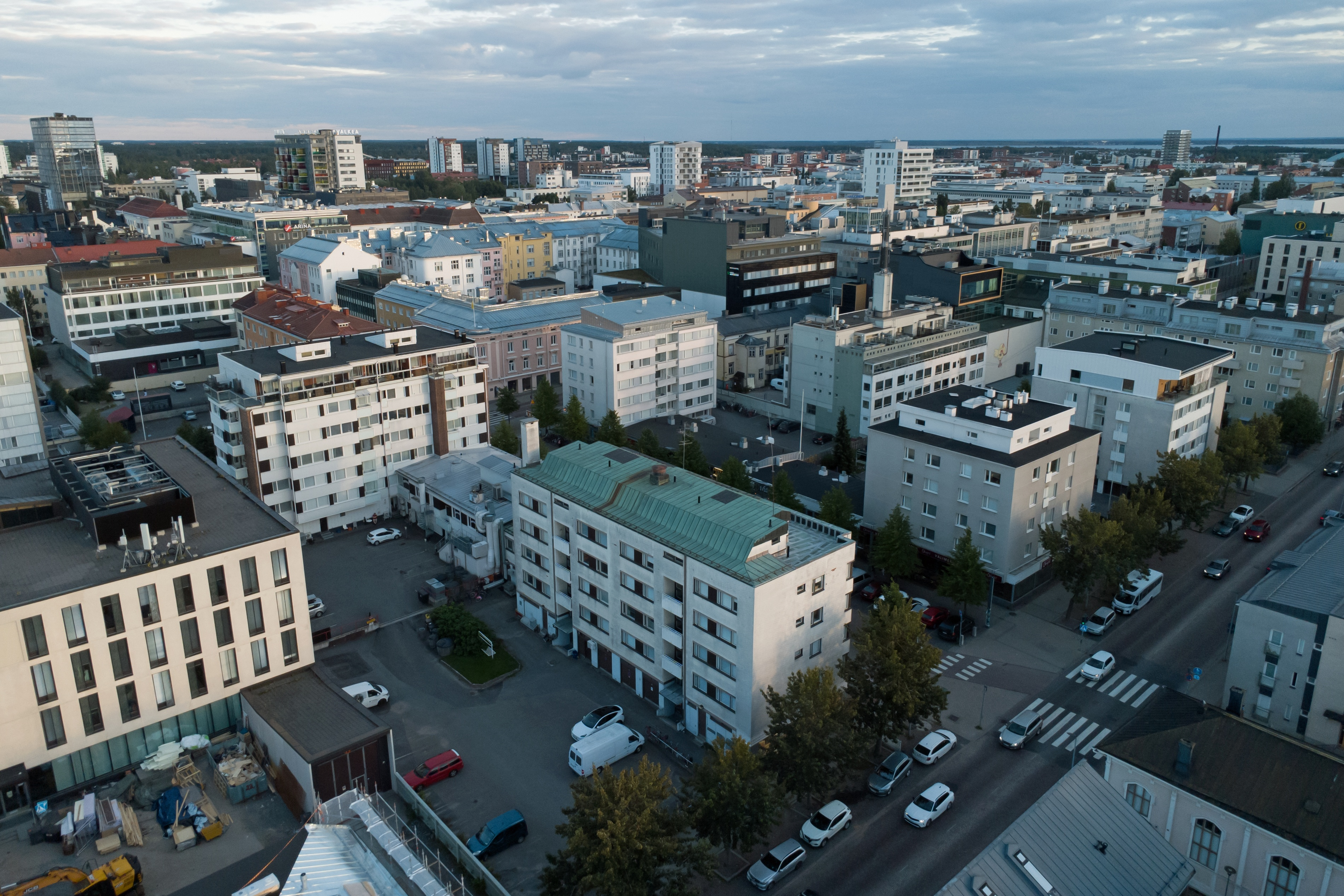
A view of Oulu city centre

The core city centre of Oulu comprises approximately 14 city blocks, bounded by the City Hall to the north, the Plaanaoja stream to the east, Albertinkatu to the southwest, and Aleksanterinkatu to the northwest. During the 21st century, the city centre has undergone densification, and the pedestrian zone Rotuaari has been extended southwards along Kirkkokatu. A major project aimed at improving the quality of the urban environment was the renovation of Mannerheim Park in 2019.

Another central green area is Otto Karhi Park, which is crossed by the Plaanaoja stream running through the city centre. The park borders Hallituskatu, a major street that continues the commercial core of the city towards the district of Raksila and the railway station.

Historically, the city centre of Oulu was characterised by relatively low-rise buildings. From the 2010s onwards, several high-rise residential towers have been constructed in the area. In 2016, the Shopping centre Valkea was completed in the core of the city centre. In addition to approximately 60 retail units, the complex includes a Sokos department store and 66 residential apartments.

At the end of 2024, around 23,800 people lived in the central major district of Oulu, representing 11% of the city’s population.

=== Ongoing development projects ===
The most significant current planning area is Raksila, located adjacent to the city centre, where a new transport and service hub is planned. The project includes a new bus terminal, commercial and office space, a hotel, and residential buildings. The Raksila area is also planned to include a multipurpose arena intended for sports and entertainment events, as well as a new hypermarket replacing the existing cluster of three grocery stores in the area.

Behind the main library, on Vänmanninsaari island, an 18-storey hotel tower is planned. The Oulu City Council approved the construction on 18 March 2024 and it is scheduled to begin in autumn 2026. The hotel is intended to address what has been considered an insufficient supply of hotel accommodation in the city. The plot has been reserved for a tower block since 1965, when the original plan for island was completed.

== Demographics ==
Historical population
Year	Pop.	±% p.a.
1815	3,543	—
1850	5,761	+1.40%
1870	7,955	+1.63%
1890	12,665	+2.35%
1910	19,802	+2.26%
1920	21,332	+0.75%
1930	24,186	+1.26%
1939	28,670	+1.91%
1950	58,149	+6.64%
1960	80,540	+3.31%
1970	102,357	+2.43%
1980	121,809	+1.76%
1990	136,029	+1.11%
2000	160,851	+1.69%
2010	185,419	+1.43%
2020	207,327	+1.12%
Source: Tilastollinen päätoimisto, Doria, Statistics Finland

The city of Oulu has 217,469 inhabitants, making it the 5th most populous municipality in Finland. The Oulu region has a population of 265,454, making it the fourth largest region in Finland after Helsinki, Tampere and Turku. Oulu is home to 4% of Finland's population. 7% of the population has a foreign background, which is lower than in the major Finnish cities of Helsinki, Espoo, Tampere, Vantaa or Turku.

=== Languages ===
Population by
mother tongue (2025)
1. Finnish (92.8%)
2. Russian (0.60%)
3. Arabic (0.50%)
4. English (0.50%)
5. Chinese (0.40%)
6. Persian (0.30%)
7. Bengali (0.30%)
8. Other (4.60%)

Oulu is the second largest monolingual Finnish-speaking municipality in Finland after Tampere. As of 2024, the majority of the population, 201,917 persons (92.8%), spoke Finnish as their first language. In addition, the number of Swedish speakers was 470 persons (0.2%) of the population. Foreign languages were spoken by 6.9% of the population. As English and Swedish are compulsory school subjects, functional bilingualism or trilingualism acquired through language studies is not uncommon.

At least 100 different languages are spoken in Oulu. The most common foreign languages are Russian (0.6%), Arabic (0.5%), English (0.5%), Chinese (0.4%) and Persian (0.3%).

=== Immigration ===
Population by country of birth (2025)
Country of birth	Population	%
Finland	201,623	92.7
Sweden	1,911	0.9
Soviet Union	1,115	0.5
China	819	0.4
India	668	0.3
Bangladesh	552	0.3
Pakistan	551	0.3
Iraq	529	0.2
Vietnam	524	0.2
Sri Lanka	515	0.2
Other	8,139	3.7

As of 2024, 14,159 people with a foreign background lived in Oulu, or 7% of the population. (Note: Statistics Finland classifies a person as having a "foreign background" if both parents or the only known parent were born abroad.) There are 15,008 residents who were born abroad, which or 7% of the population. The number of foreign citizens in Oulu is 10,198. Most foreign-born citizens come from the former Soviet Union, Sweden, China, India, Iraq, Iran and Vietnam.

The relative share of immigrants in Oulu's population is below the national average. Nevertheless, the city's new residents are increasingly of foreign origin. This will increase the proportion of foreign residents in the coming years.

=== Religion ===
In 2023, the Evangelical Lutheran Church was the largest religious group with 67.2% of the population of Oulu. Other religious groups accounted for 1.9% of the population. 30.9% of the population had no religious affiliation.

Oulu, as well as other parts of North Ostrobothnia, is well known as a strong support area of the Conservative Laestadianism revival movement. A Laestadian background has been estimated to be common in construction sector management.

== Economy ==
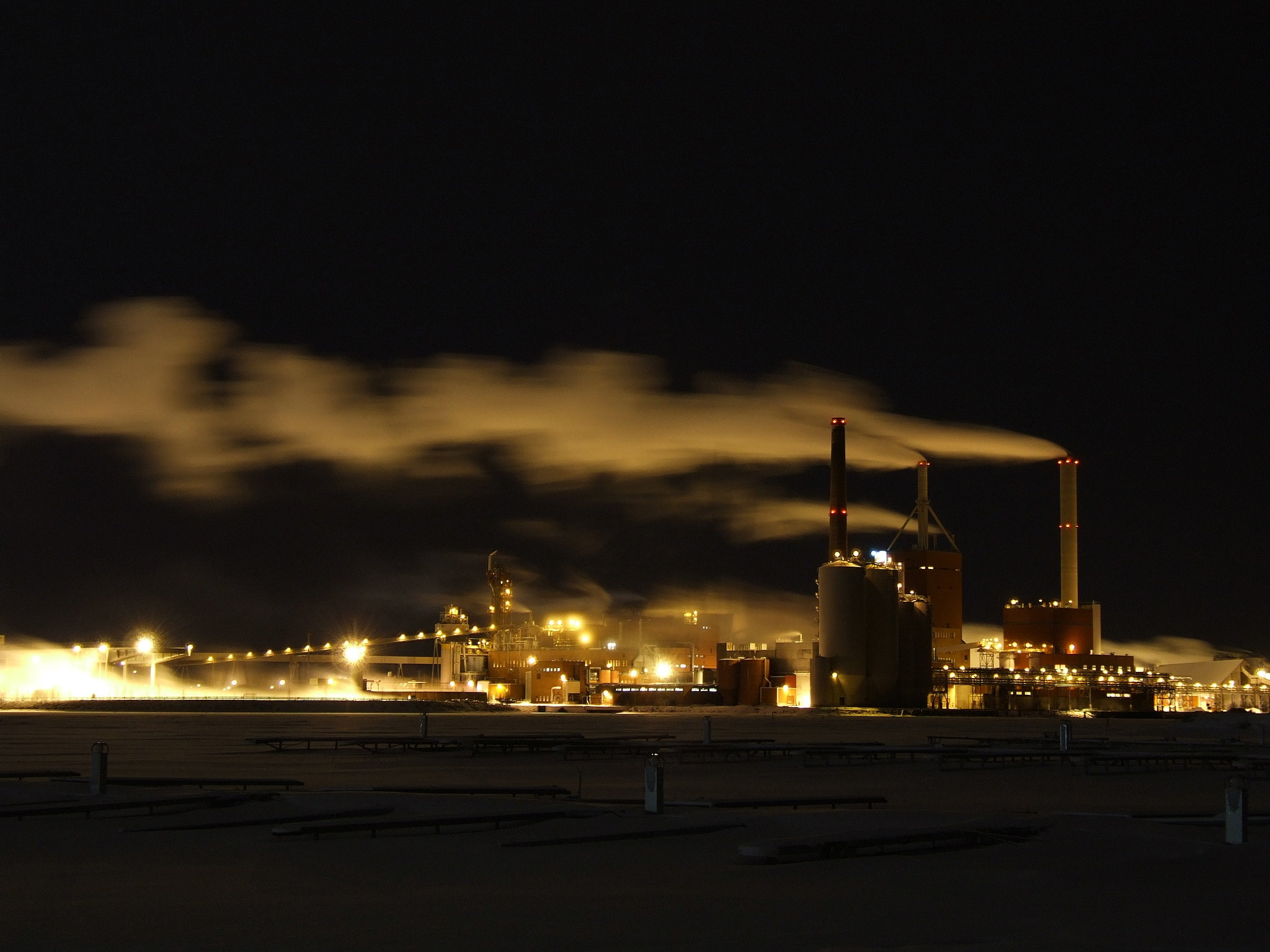
Stora Enso has an important paper manufacturing plant in Oulu.

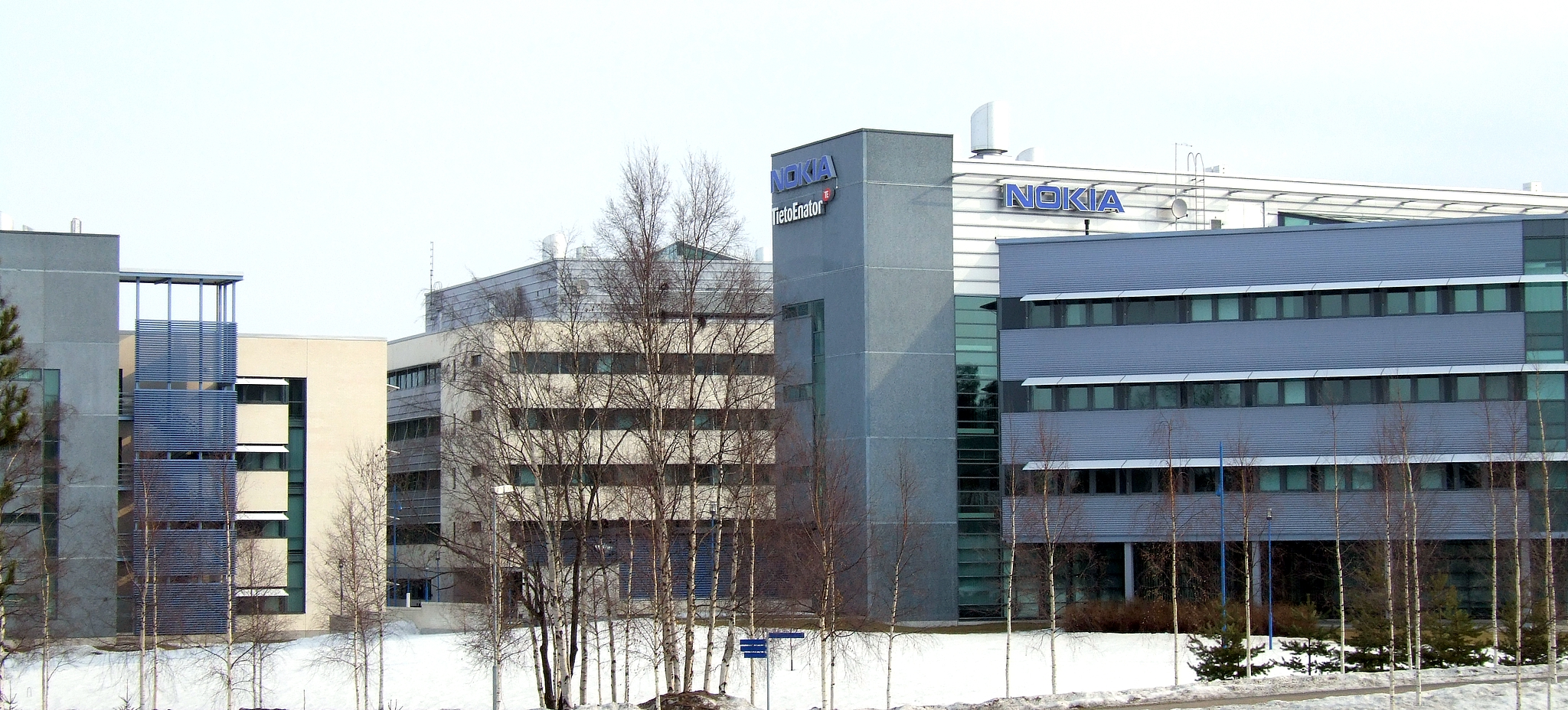
Former Nokia premises in Peltola.

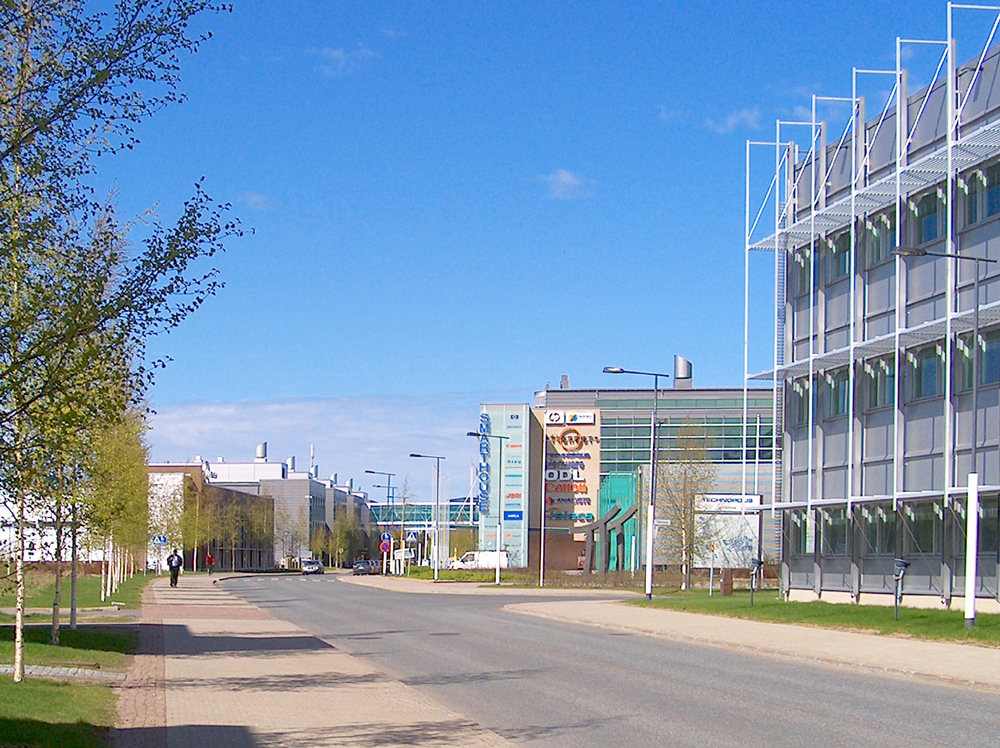
Technopolis Linnanmaa is home to nearly 200 corporations.

As of 31 December 2008, the active working population was employed as follows:

Industries	Working population
Services	43,049
Industry	11,111
Commerce	10,848
Construction	5,449
Transport	3,698
Farming, forestry and mining	582
Unknown	431
Unemployment rate	13.8%
Total	75,158

In 2011, the most important employers were:

Employer	No. of employees
City of Oulu	9,709
Northern Ostrobothnia Hospital District	6,144
University of Oulu	3,045
Nokia Networks	2,100
Nokia Group	2,000
The Oulu Region Joint Authority for Vocational Training	1,955
Kesko Group	1,426
Cooperative Arina Group (S Group)	1,107
Stora Enso Group	1,155
Itella Corporation	780
ISS Palvelut Oy	730
ODL Group	653

== Culture ==
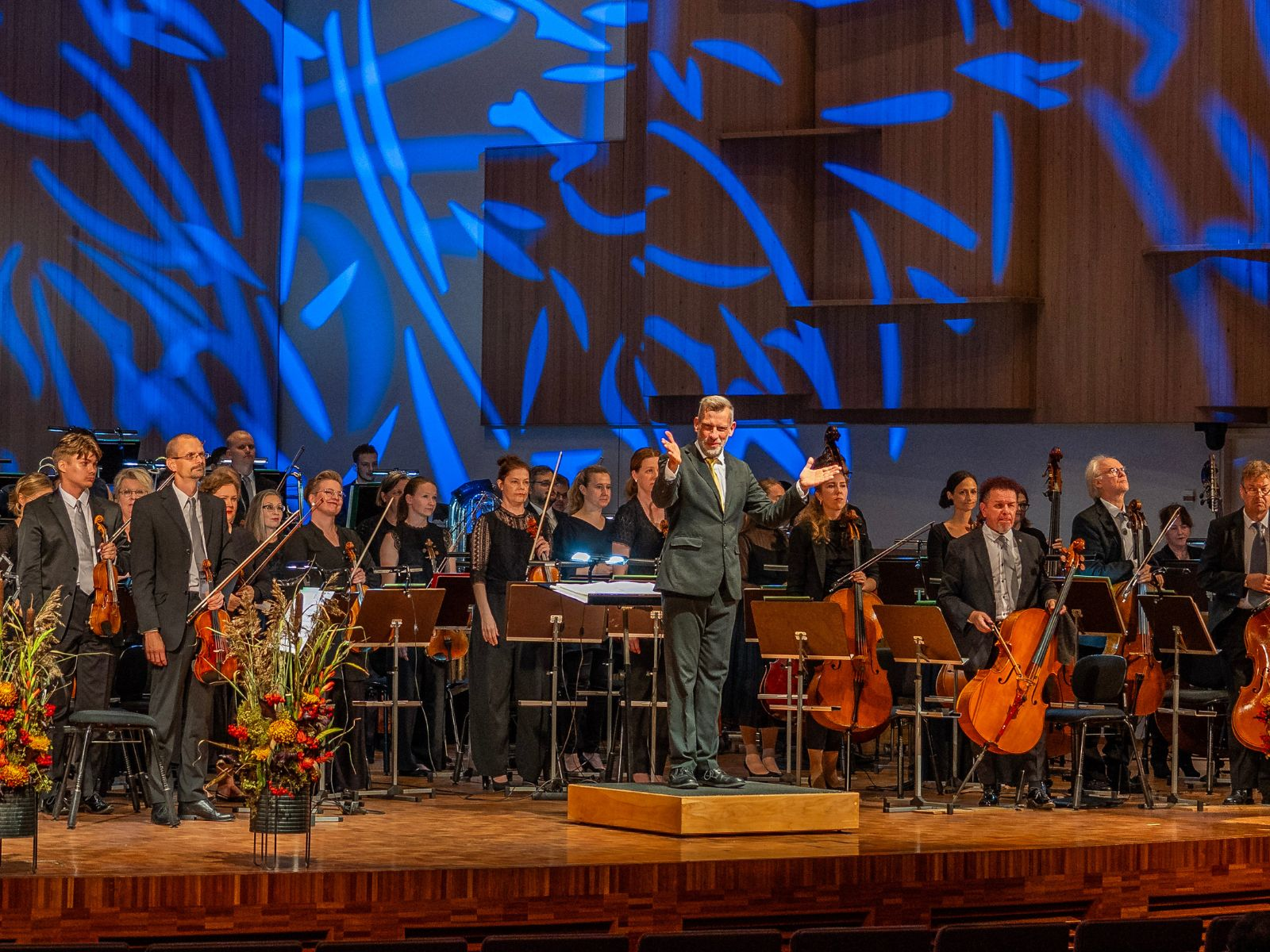
Oulu Symphony Orchestra and chief conductor Rumon Gamba

Oulu has a diverse and active cultural scene, combining local traditions with contemporary and international influences. The city is known for its strong emphasis on music, festivals, and community-based cultural activities, and it has developed a reputation as one of the cultural centres of northern Finland.

One of Oulu's most internationally recognised cultural events is the Air Guitar World Championships, held annually in August since 1996. The event attracts participants and audiences from around the world and has become a symbol of the city's creative and unconventional cultural identity. Other notable cultural exports include the avant-garde performance group Mieskuoro Huutajat (Screaming Men) and the metal band Sentenced. The crime drama television series All the Sins (Kaikki synnit), filmed in the Oulu region between 2018 and 2021, has also contributed to the city's cultural visibility.

Music plays a central role in Oulu's cultural life. The city hosts numerous concerts and festivals throughout the year, covering genres such as rock, classical music, and jazz. Major annual events include the Oulu Music Video Festival in August, as well as the popular rock festival Qstock in July, one of the largest music festivals in Finland. The Oulu Music Festival takes place during the winter months, while the Oulunsalo Music Festival is held in summer. Additional recurring events include The Irish Festival of Oulu in October and the International Children's Film Festival in November.

The Madetoja Hall (Madetojan sali), completed in 1983, is home to the EU's northernmost professional symphony orchestra, Oulu Sinfonia. The hall is named after the composer Leevi Madetoja.

Oulu also offers a range of museums and cultural institutions. These include the Northern Ostrobothnia Museum, which presents regional history and culture; the Oulu Museum of Art (OMA), focusing on contemporary art; the science centre Tietomaa, one of the first science centres in Finland; and the Turkansaari Open-Air Museum, which showcases traditional rural life in the region.

Public art is a visible part of the cityscape. Notable works include a statue of the poet sculpture of Frans Michael Franzén and the well-known Toripolliisi (The Bobby at the Market Place), which has become an iconic symbol of Oulu.

=== Communication ===
Kaleva, an independent newspaper founded in 1899, is published in Oulu. In 2013 Kaleva had a circulation of 69,540 copies and was the sixth largest Finnish newspaper by circulation.

=== Food ===
In the 1980s, rössypottu, salmon soup and sweet cheese (juhannusjuusto) were named Oulu's traditional parish dishes.

== Sights ==
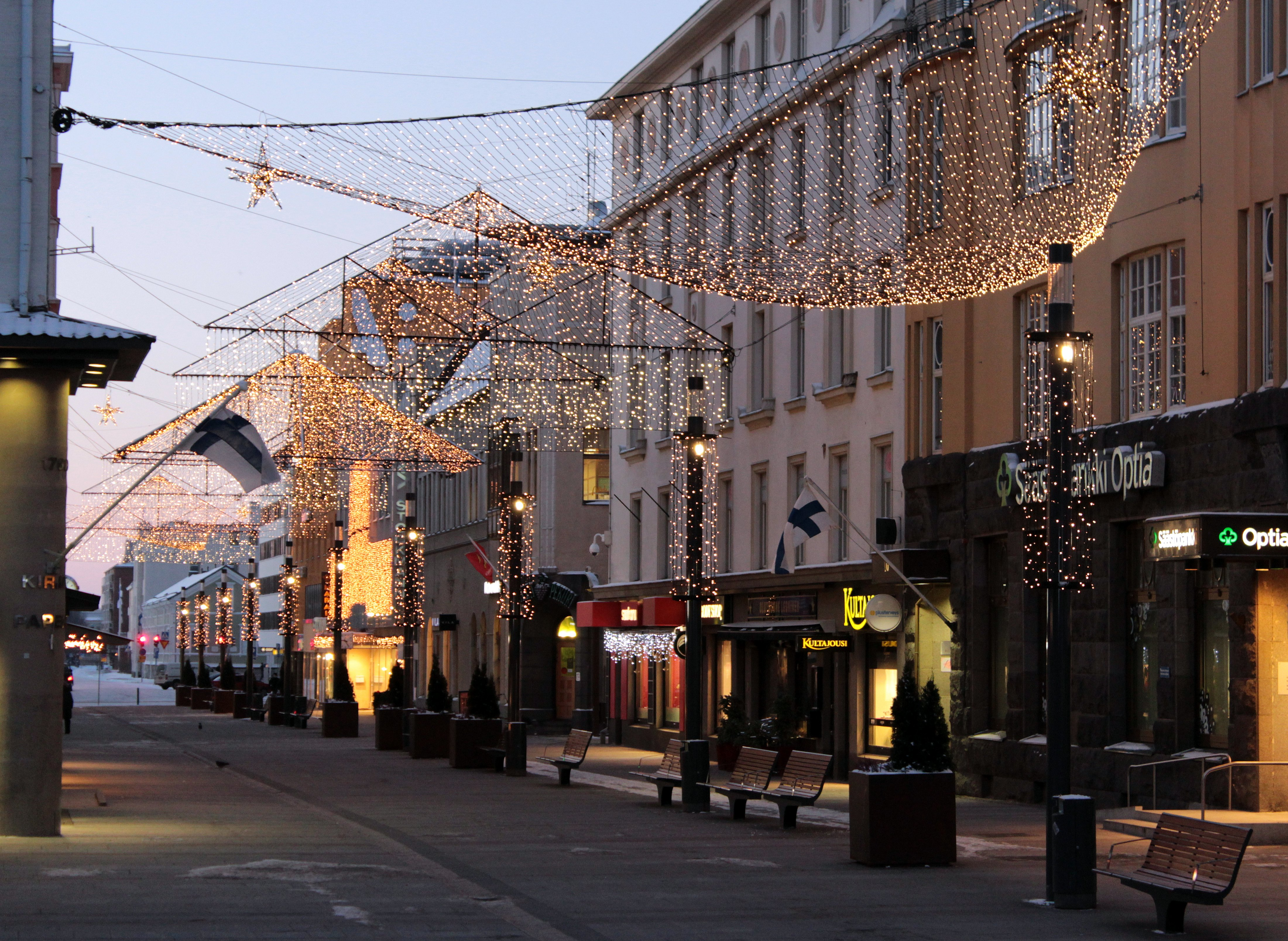
Rotuaari pedestrian zone

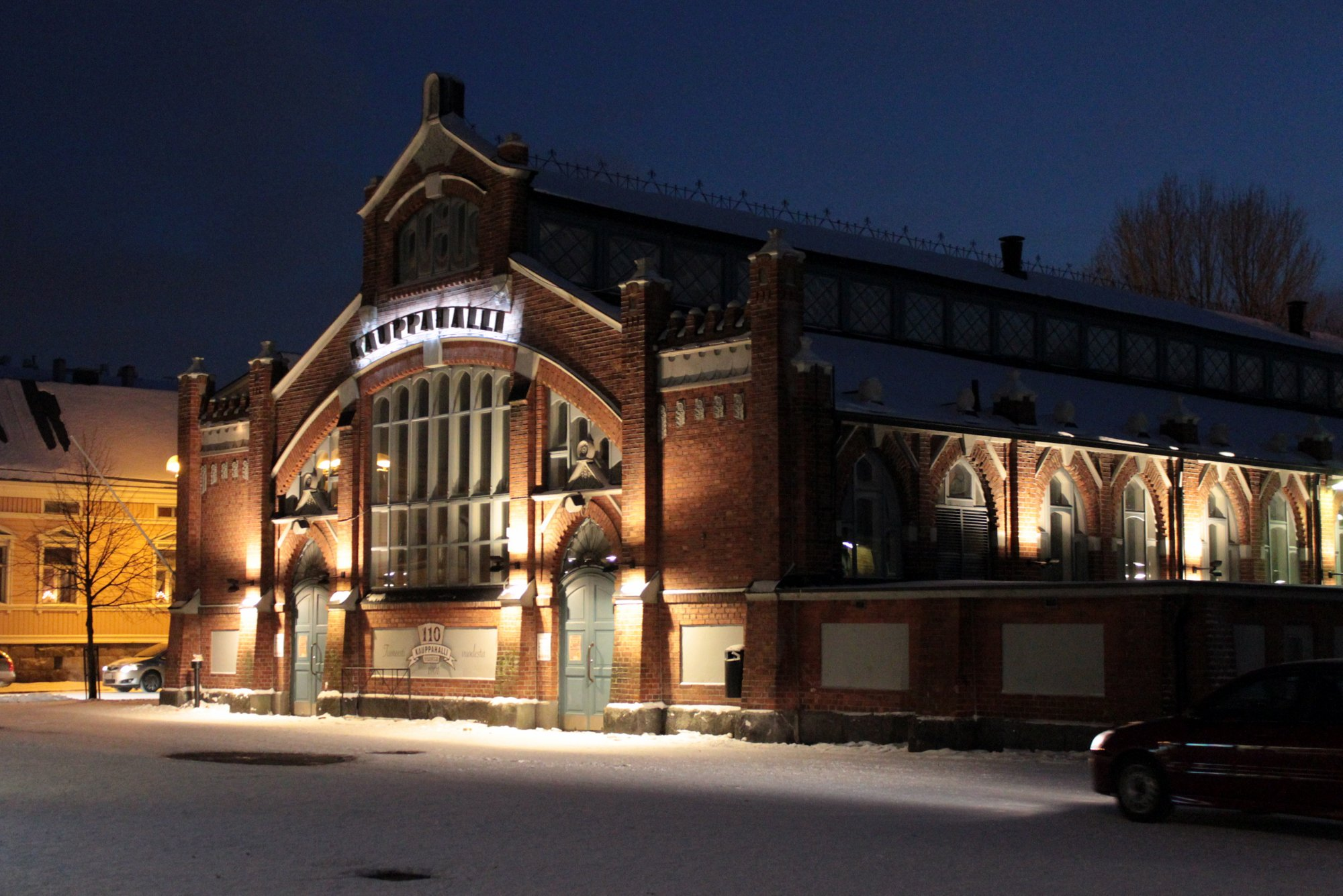
Oulu Market Hall

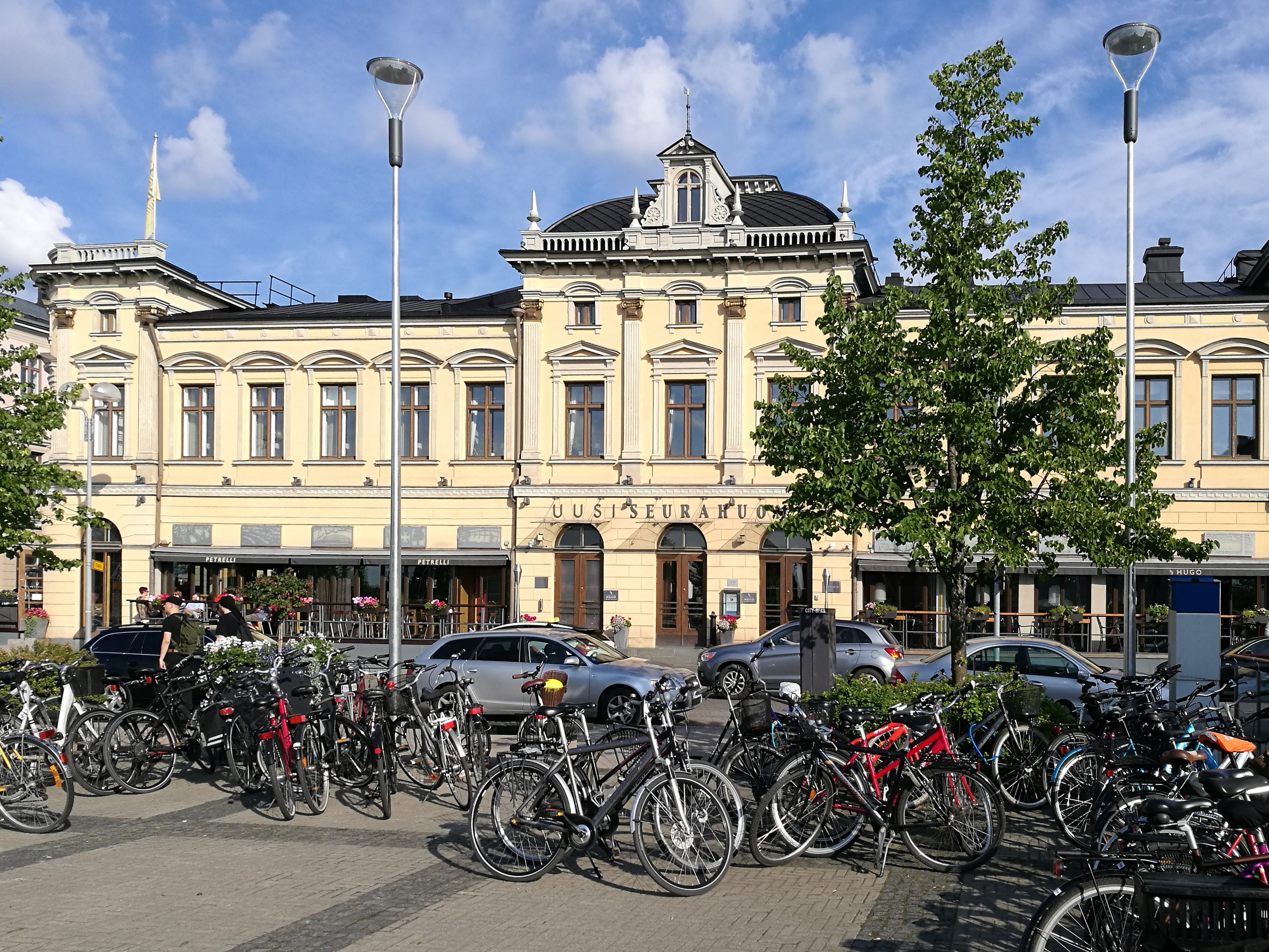
Uusi Seurahuone restaurant on the Ahtisaari Square

- Tietomaa, a science center with over 150 exhibits
- The Rapids Center, the area in the estuary of the Oulu river consisting of small islands connected with bridges and fountains in the middle of the river, and including a housing area of building blocks planned by Alvar Aalto
- The Market Square with the City Library, the City Theatre, the Toripolliisi statue and old salt and tar storehouses
- Hupisaaret Islands, a large park area located in the estuary of the Oulu river
- The F. M. Franzen memorial
- The Koitelinkoski rapids
- The Northern Ostrobothnia museum
- The Pateniemi Sawmill Museum
- The Vehicle Museum
- The University of Oulu Botanical Gardens (situated in Linnanmaa)
- The Arctic Gallery
- Turkansaari (historical open-air museum)
- Sand beach in Nallikari recreation and tourism area
- Mannerheim Park
- Old observatory in Linnansaari, built in 1875 on top of the ruins of the Castle of Oulu
- Oulu Museum of Art

=== Churches ===
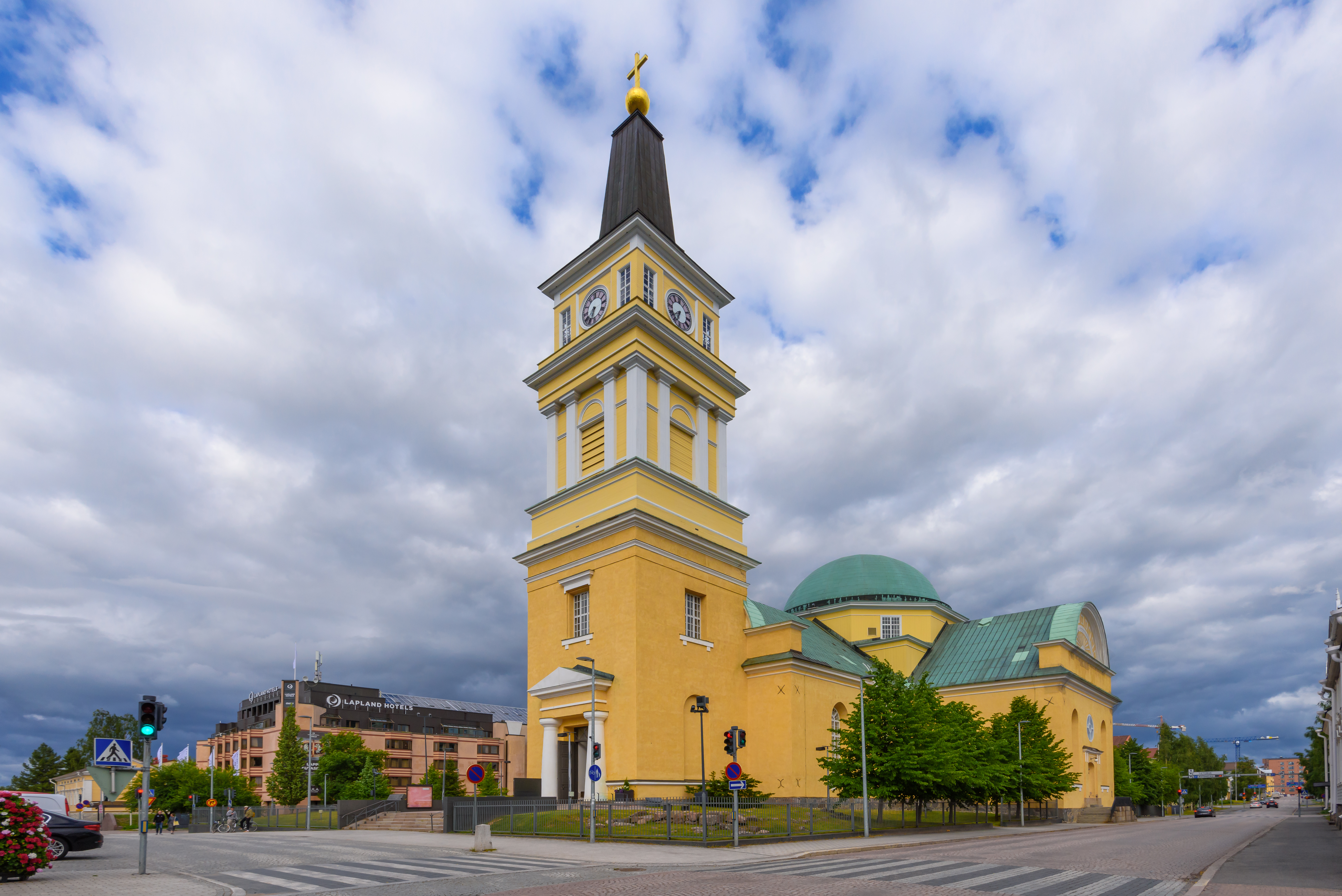
Oulu Cathedral

- Cathedral
- Haukipudas Church
- Holy Family of Nazareth Church
- Holy Trinity Cathedral of Oulu
- Kiiminki Church
- Oulujoki Church
- Oulunsalo Church
- St. Luke's Chapel
- Tuira Church
- Ylikiiminki Church

=== Other points of interest ===
- Qstock music festival
- Oulu Music Video Festival
- Air Guitar World Championships
- Jalometalli Metal Music Festival
- The Irish Festival of Oulu
- Laitakari beacon tower
- Madetoja Hall, housing the Oulu Music Centre, the residence of the Oulu Symphony Orchestra
- Oulu Hall (a large indoor sports facility consisting of a low dome, which looks somewhat like a landed flying saucer)
- Terwa Marathon & Run, event in late May (since 1989)
- The Terva-skiing event in early March (since 1889)
- The Winter Swimming World Championship

== Transport ==
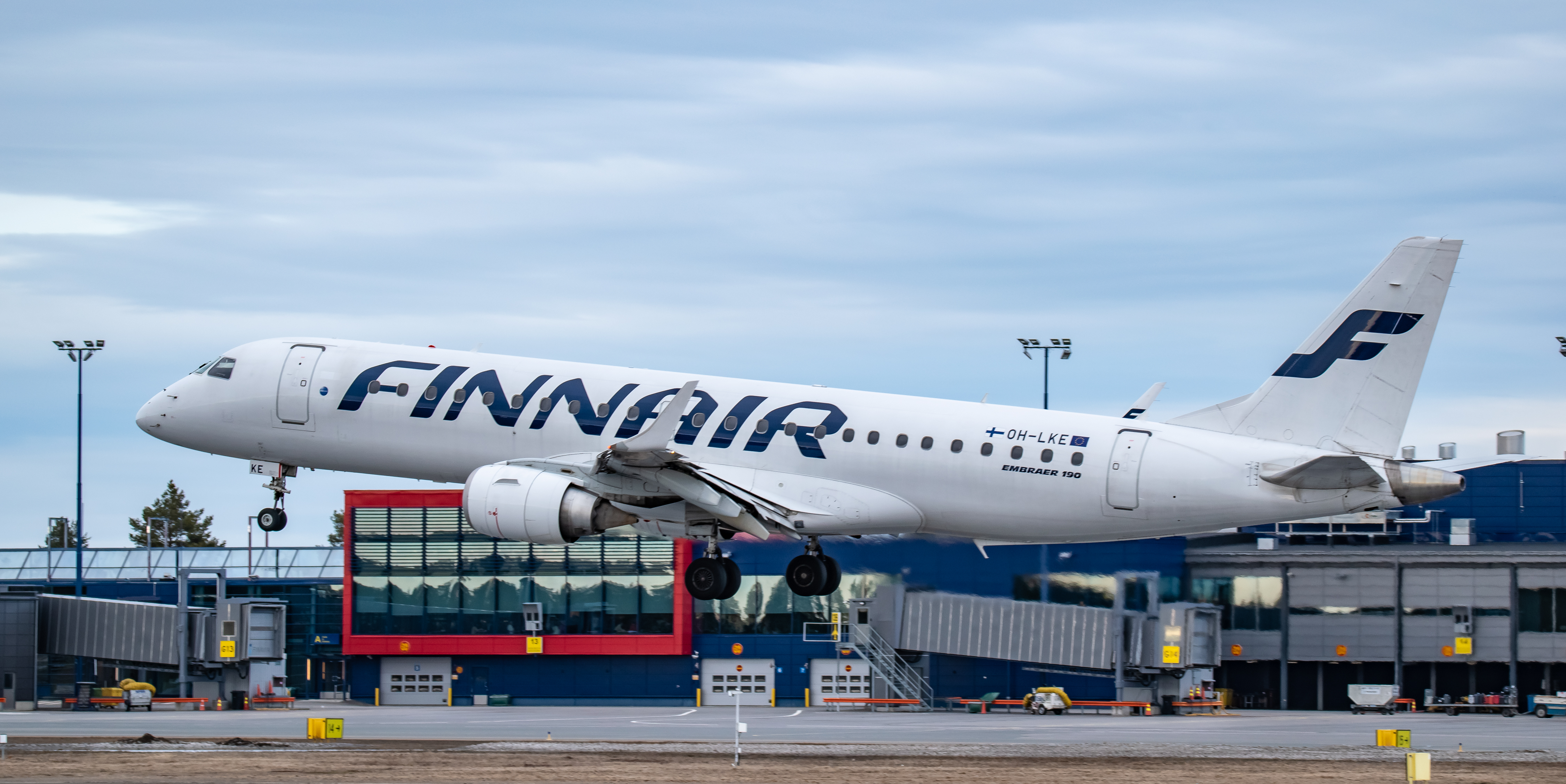
Finnair is one of the main operators of the Oulu airport with regular flights to Helsinki.

=== Intercity ===
Oulu is served by Oulu Airport, the third largest airport in Finland by passenger volume. It is located 15 kilometres (9 mi) south-west of the city centre.

The Port of Oulu is one of the busiest harbours on the Bothnian Bay. It includes four separate harbour areas: Vihreäsaari oil and bulk docks, Nuottasaari docks and Oritkari docks. There is also a ferry service in Oulu, which is mostly used between Oulunsalo and the Hailuoto Island. An 8.4-kilometer causeway, including two 750-meter-long bridges, is being built between the mainland and the island. The work is scheduled for completion in 2026.

The shortest travel time from Oulu railway station to Helsinki Central railway station is 5 h 34 min, operated by VR. Other destinations include Kolari, Rovaniemi, Seinäjoki and Tampere.

The most important road in Oulu is Highway 4 (E8/E75) that runs from Helsinki to Utsjoki via Lahti, Jyväskylä, Oulu, Kemi and Rovaniemi. Other highways running to and from Oulu are Highway 20 to Kuusamo and Highway 22 to Kajaani.

=== Within the city ===
Oulu is notable for its transportation network dedicated to non-motor vehicular traffic, including pedestrians and bicycles (termed "light" traffic in Finland). In 2022, the city contained more than 950 kilometres (590 mi) of pathways and more than 300 underpasses and bridges devoted exclusively to pedestrian and bicycle traffic. The network is used year-round. The ratio of walking and cycling traffic pathways to residents is the highest in Finland and the cycling mode share is 20 percent.

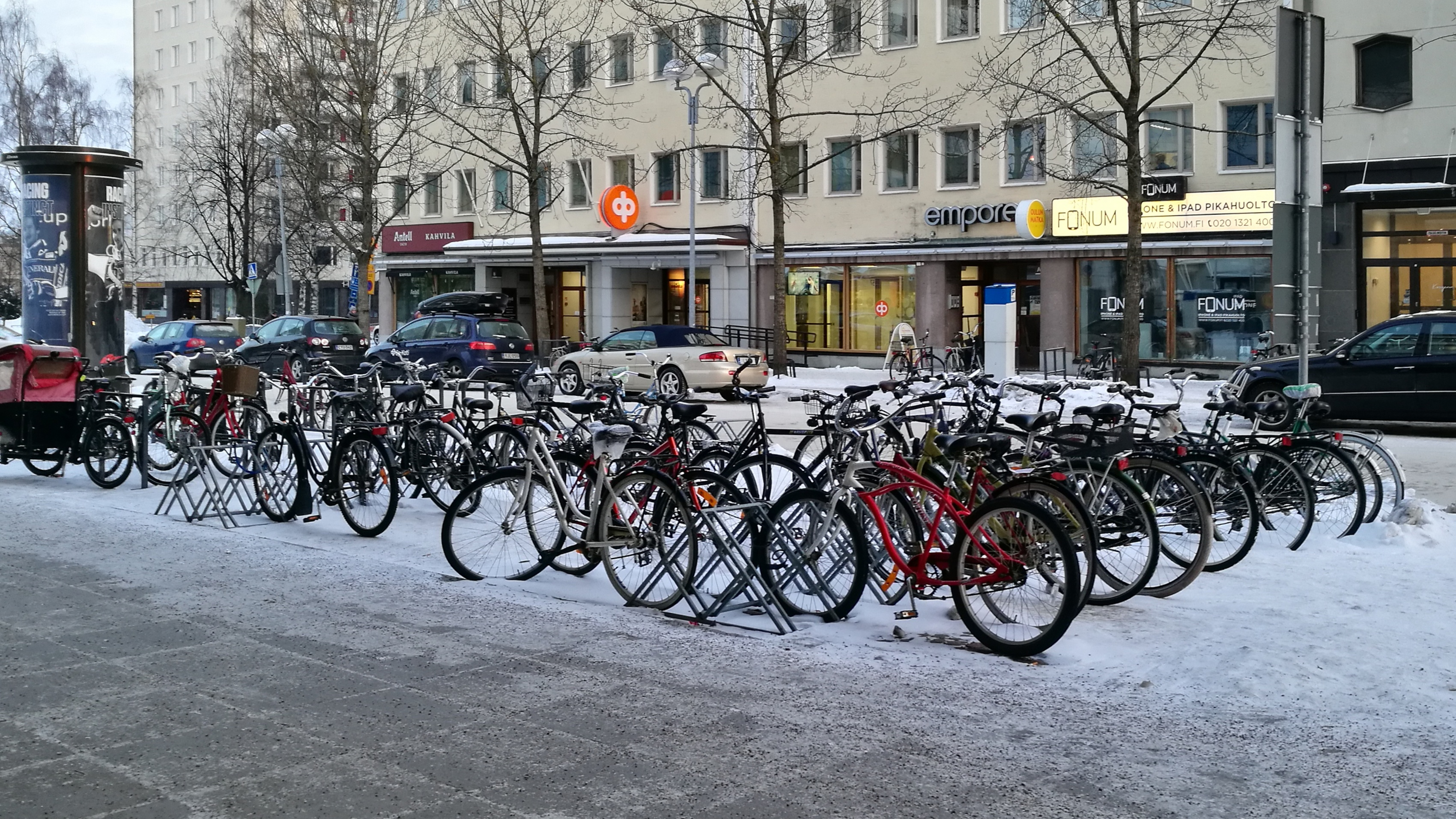
Parked bicycles on Kirkkokatu Street in January

Even in winter, bicycle commuting remains strong in Oulu, in spite of the cold, dark, and snow. About 12% of winter trips are by bicycle, and about half of trips to school or university are. The city has a robust system for keeping bike paths maintained and clear of snow, and bike paths and lanes are plowed before roadways to encourage such human-scale winter transit in the city where 12% already do so. The Winter Cycling Federation was founded in Oulu in 2013, and the first Winter Cycling Congress was held there.

In 2015, a large underground parking facility, Kivisydän (Stone Heart), opened in the city center directly beneath main shopping streets. The network of parallel roads for cars and pedestrians was drilled in the rock at the depth of 30 meters (98 ft). The parking facility includes two ramps, 900 visitor parking lots (expandable to 1500), six access points to the ground served by 19 elevators (expandable to nine and 25), a service facility for commercial delivery vehicles, and ubi-screens that guide the driver to the selected ground access point and help locate the parked car by its license number.

== Solar power ==
In 2015, the Kaleva Media printing plant in Oulu became the most powerful photovoltaic solar plant in Finland, with 1,604 solar photovoltaic (PV) units on its roof. Although the city of Oulu, located near the Arctic Circle, has only two hours of weak sunlight in December, the photovoltaic cells work almost around the clock in the summer. The cold climate means the PV panels can get up to a 25% boost per hour, as they don't overheat.

Because the sun is quite low in the sky at this latitude, vertical PV installations are popular on the sides of buildings. These solar walls also capture light reflected from snow.

Snow is not necessarily cleared from rooftop solar installations.

The local utility, Oulun Energia, is owned by the city of Oulu. The energy mix it receives from the Nordic-wide grid includes wood pellets, waste incineration, bioenergy, hydro-electric, geothermal, wind, nuclear, peat, natural gas and coal.

== Sports ==
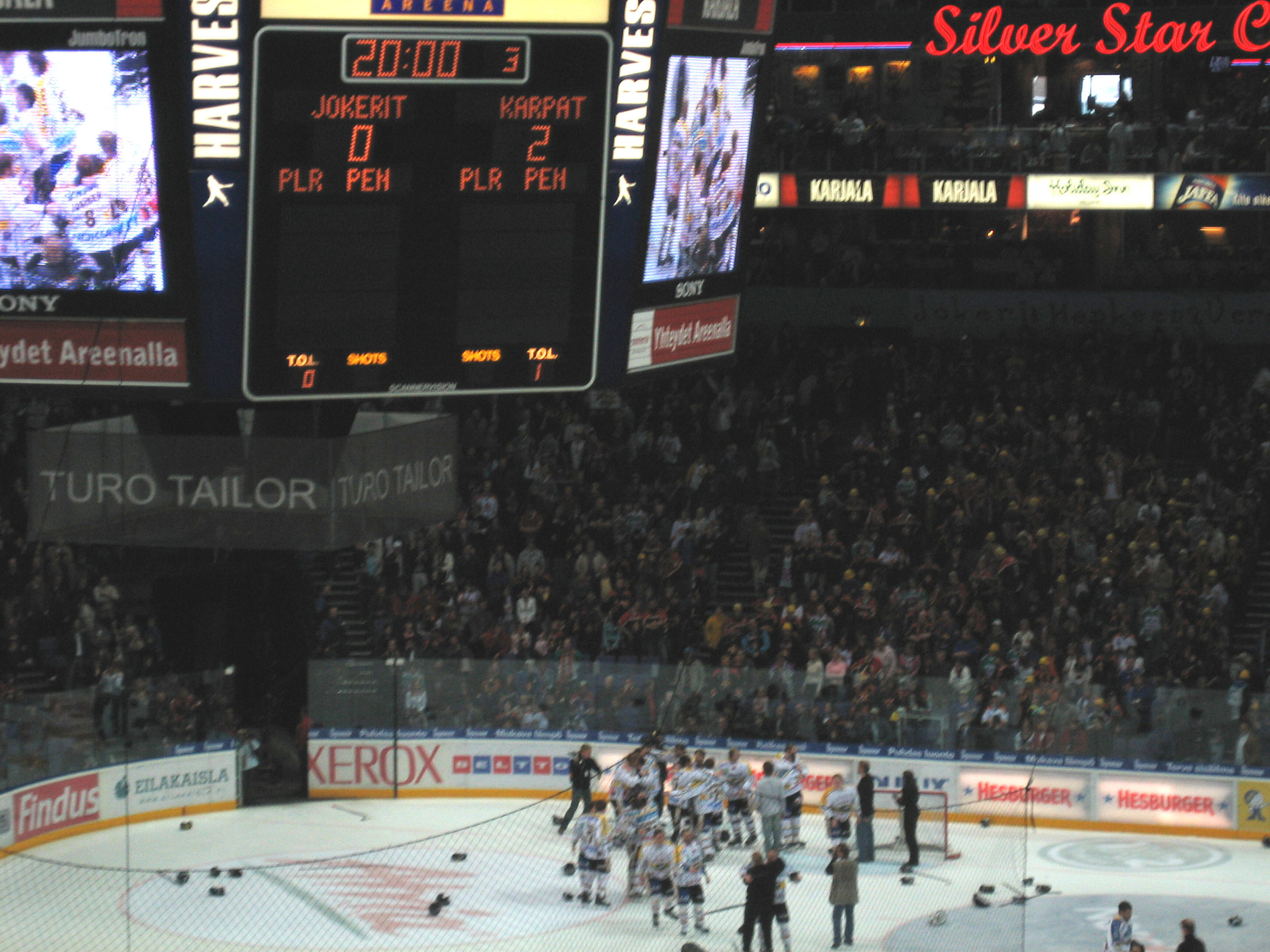
Kärpät wins the Finnish championship in 2005 after beating Jokerit.

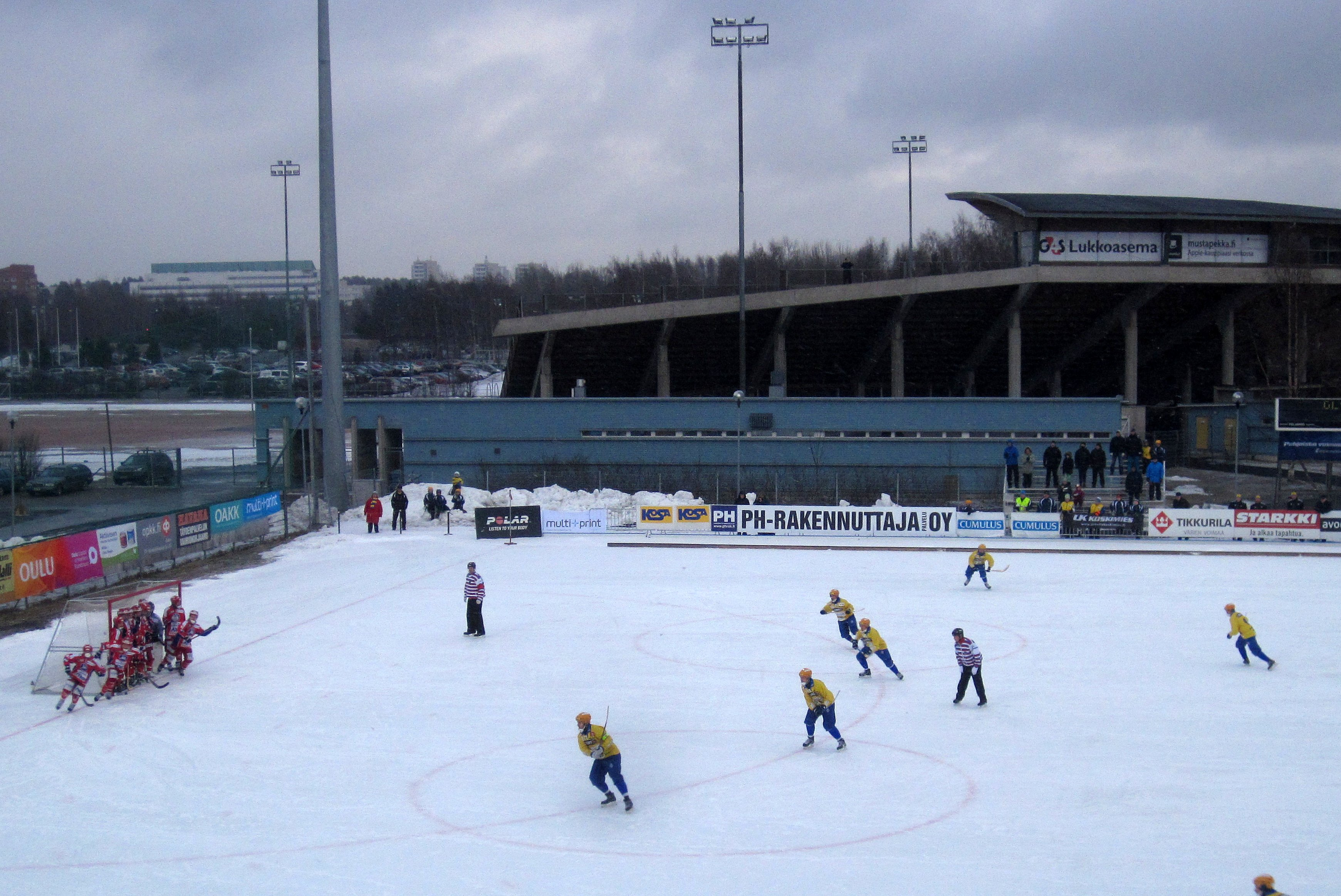
Oulun Luistinseura beat Jyväskylän Seudun Palloseura in the 2014 Finland men's national bandy championship final at the Raksila Artificial Ice Rink Pakkalan kenttä.

Ice hockey is the most popular spectator sport in Oulu. The local club Kärpät has won the SM-liiga championship title eight times (1981, 2004, 2005, 2007, 2008, 2014, 2015 and 2018). It has also twice been the runner-up in the IIHF European Champions Cup, in 2005 and in 2006.

In football AC Oulu plays in Veikkausliiga, the premier division of Finnish football. So far only OPS has claimed the Finnish football championship twice by winning Mestaruussarja in 1979 and in 1980. Other notable football clubs include OLS, OTP and JS Hercules.

Oulu has one well-known bandy club, OLS, which plays in Bandyliiga and has become Finnish champions 14 times, most recently in 2014. The other bandy club, OPS, with its 7 championships and a bronze medal as late as in 2009, announced it would be closing down after the 2009–10 season. In 2001 the city was the main venue for the Bandy World Championship.

Oulu is also home to several other sports clubs such as Oulu Northern Lights (American football), Oulun NMKY (Basketball), Oulun Lippo (Pesäpallo), Oulun Pyrintö (Track and field), SK Pohjantähti (Orienteering), OYUS (Rugby union), Oulu Irish Elks (Gaelic football) and ETTA (Volleyball).

Oulun Tervahiihto is an annual ski marathon event held since 1889.

Terwa Run & Marathon is an annual running event held since 1989 in late May.

Pokkinen Park in Oulu hosts the northern-most Parkrun every Saturday at 9:30.

A former motorcycle speedway track known as the Iinat Motor Sports Center was located north of the Pirttilammentie and east of the Iinatintie (64°57′31″N 25°34′23″E). The Center opened in 1979 and hosted many events, including the Finnish Final, as part of the qualifying round of the Speedway World Championship in 1983.

== Education ==
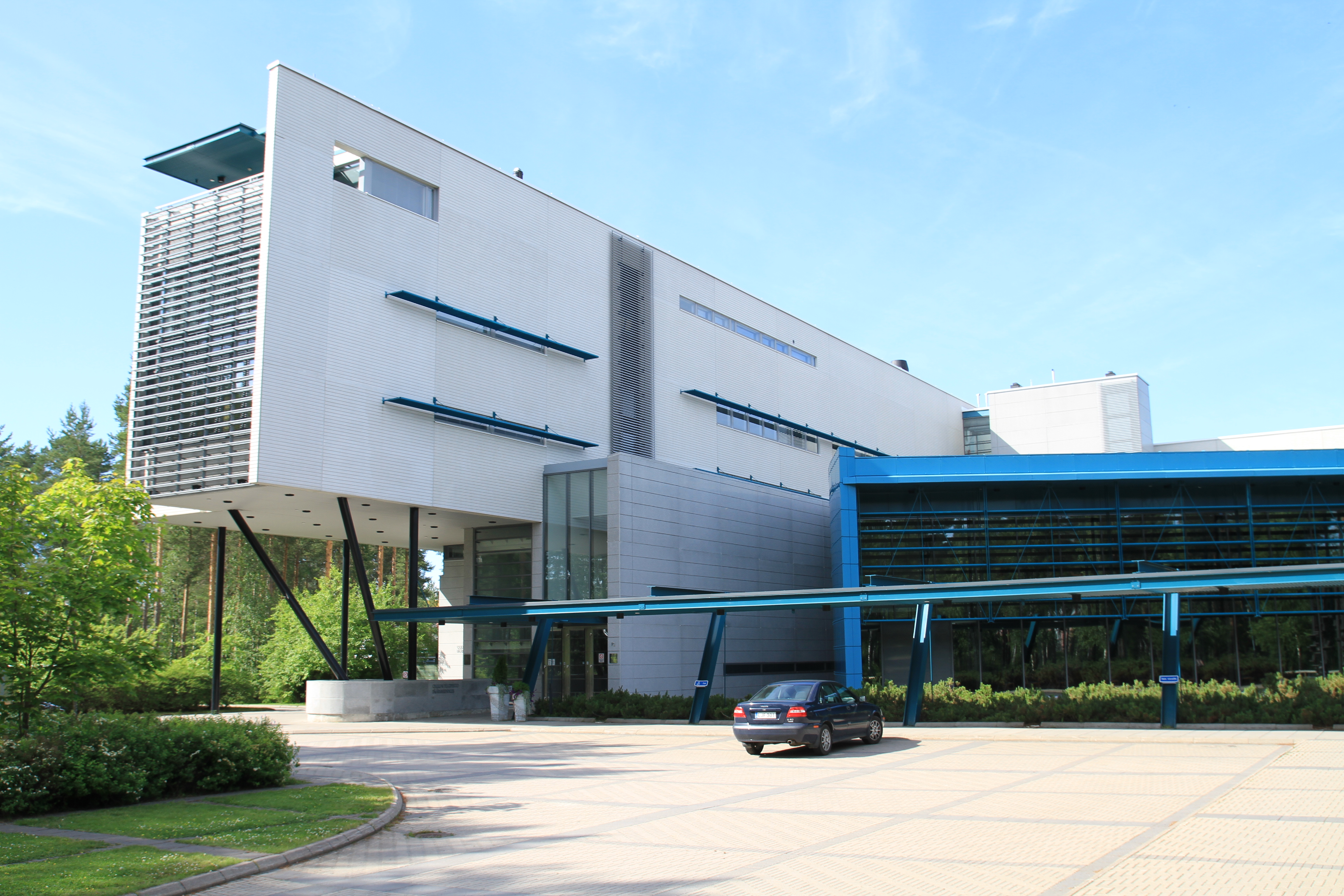
University of Oulu main building.

The University of Oulu and Oulu University of Applied Sciences have their main campuses located in Oulu.

Oulu is home to the most northerly architecture school in the world. The school is best known for its strong regionalistic ideas for developing architecture. This movement is named "the Oulu school" ("Oulun koulu") of architecture.

Oulu Vocational College has over 13,000 students. It houses several different study subjects in different units which are spread over Oulu and neighbouring municipalities. Oulu Vocational College School of Business Studies is one of the few vocational schools which has game programming in its curriculum.

Oulu International School is one of nine schools in Finland offering basic education in English. There is also a Swedish-speaking private school (Swedish Svenska Privatskolan i Uleåborg) for students up until high school. The school is the northernmost Swedish-speaking school in Finland.

== Notable people ==
- Saara Aalto, singer, The X Factor UK finalist
- Eero Aho, actor
- Outi Alanko-Kahiluoto, politician
- Marcus Amand, Finnish-French racing driver
- Peter von Bagh, film historian and director
- Blind Channel, a post-hardcore band, Finland's Eurovision representatives 2021
- Vladislav Delay, electronic musician
- Eeva Riitta Fingerroos, Paralympic swimmer
- Frans Michael Franzén, poet
- Lars Gallenius, 17th century painter
- Heidi Hautala, politician
- Matti Hautamäki, ski jumper
- Aaro Hellaakoski, poet
- John von Julin, pharmacist, factory owner and vuorineuvos
- Yrjö Kallinen, politician
- Jorma Kontio, harness driver
- Pekka Korpi, harness driver
- V.A. Koskenniemi, poet
- Ville Laihiala, musician and former frontman of the discontinued local metal band Sentenced
- Vilho Lampi, painter
- Miki Liukkonen, writer, poet and musician
- Taavetti Lukkarinen, former foreman of Kemi Oy; man who was convicted to death and hanged of treason
- Fanni Luukkonen, the leader of Lotta Svärd
- Leevi Madetoja, composer
- Einari Merikallio, ornithologist, educator and academic journal editor
- Impaled Nazarene, nuclear metal band
- Iivo Niskanen, Olympic champion cross-country skier
- Kerttu Niskanen, cross-country skier
- Jaakko Ohtonen, actor
- Patrik Pasma, racing driver
- Leena Peltonen-Palotie, geneticist
- Michael Maria Penttilä, serial killer
- Susanna Pöykiö, figure skater
- Ville Ranta, comic artist
- Mika Ronkainen, filmmaker
- Keke Rosberg, 1982 Formula One world champion
- Kauko Röyhkä, author and rock musician
- Martti Suosalo, singer and actor
- Pertti Sveholm, actor
- Mikael Toppelius, church painter
- Risto Tuorila, actor
- Juha Väätäinen, athlete
- Sara Wacklin, teacher and writer
- Gustaf Wilson, Finnish-American pioneer and businessman
- Three former presidents of the country Kaarlo Juho Ståhlberg, Kyösti Kallio and Martti Ahtisaari, also a Nobel Peace Prize laureate
- Ice Hockey players: Kari Jalonen, Mikael Granlund, Markus Granlund, Joni Pitkänen, Reijo Ruotsalainen, Mika Pyörälä, Lasse Kukkonen, Markus Nutivaara and Sebastian Aho
- Football/soccer players: Rasmus Karjalainen, Otso Liimatta, Aki Lahtinen, Antti Niemi, Markus Heikkinen, Janne Hietanen, Mika Nurmela and Seppo Pyykkö
- Qiyu Zhou, chess player, commentator, and streamer

== International relations ==
=== Twin towns and sister cities ===
Oulu is twinned with:

- Alta Municipality, Norway (since 1948)
- Arkhangelsk, Russia (since 1993)
- Astana, Kazakhstan (since 2013)
- Boden, Sweden (since 1948)
- Bursa, Turkey (since 1978)
- Halle, Germany (since 1968)
- Leverkusen, Germany (since 1968)
- Odesa, Ukraine (since 1957)
- Siófok, Hungary (since 1978)
- Hangzhou, China (since 2010)

Oulu also maintains relationships with cities twinned to former municipalities merged with Oulu in 2013:

- Matera, Italy (twinned with Oulunsalo since 2010)
- Szigetszentmiklós, Hungary (twinned with Haukipudas since 1992)
- Kronstadt, Russia (twinned with Haukipudas, Kiiminki, and Yli-Ii since 1991)

=== Partnership and twinning cities ===
In addition Oulu has eight 'Partnership & Twinning cities':

- Glasgow, UK
- Ilembula, Tanzania
- Karlsruhe, Germany
- Luleå, Sweden
- Matagalpa, Nicaragua
- Sendai, Japan (since 2005)
- Umeå, Sweden
- Vienne, France

=== International municipal projects ===
The educational department was a part of the Lifelong Learning Programme 2007–2013 in Finland.

=== Crime ===
Oulu was the site of the 2018 Oulu child sexual exploitation scandal. Prime Minister Juha Sipilä declared that "Sex crimes against children are inhumane acts of incomprehensible evil."

== Gallery ==
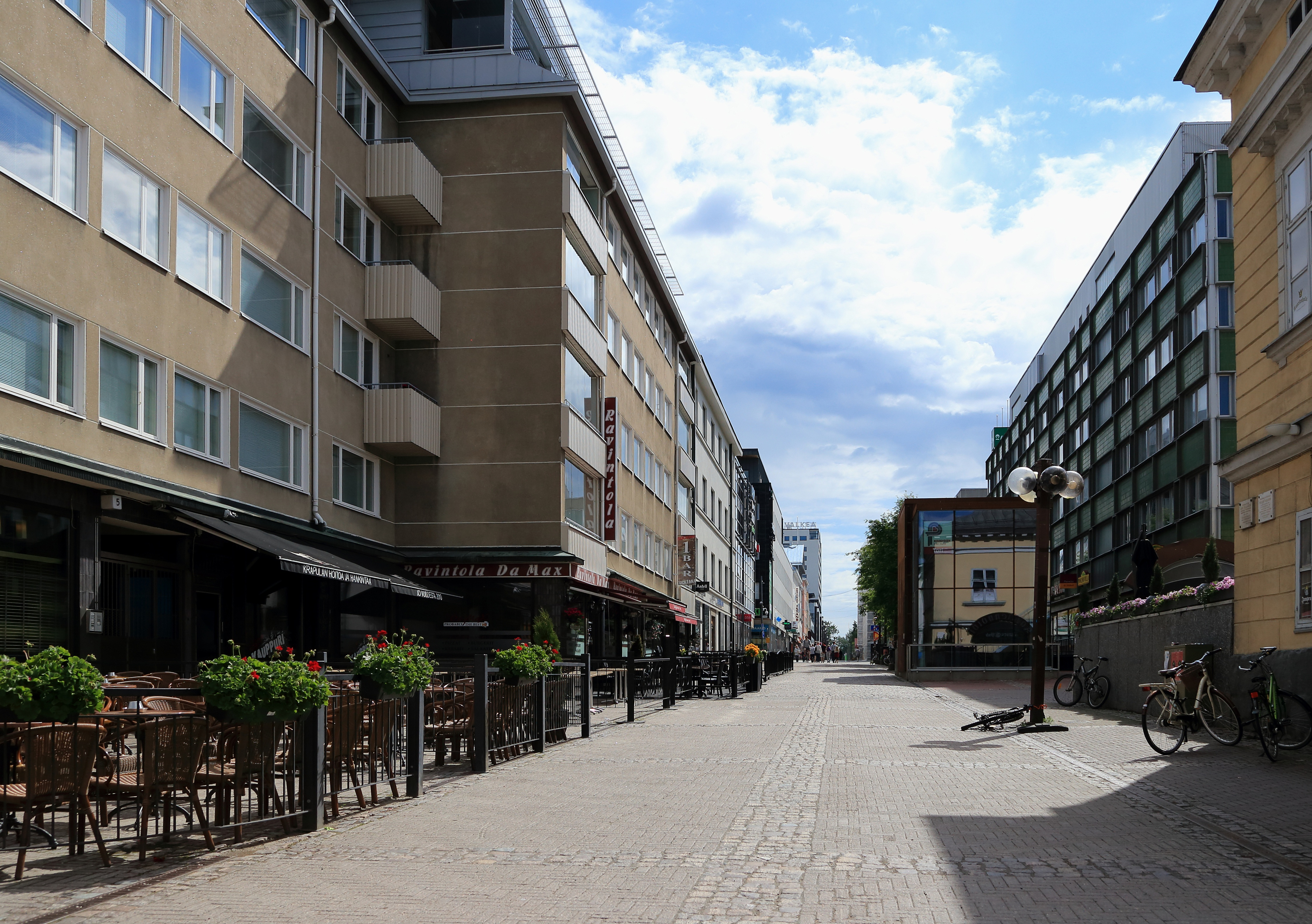
Kauppurienkatu in city center

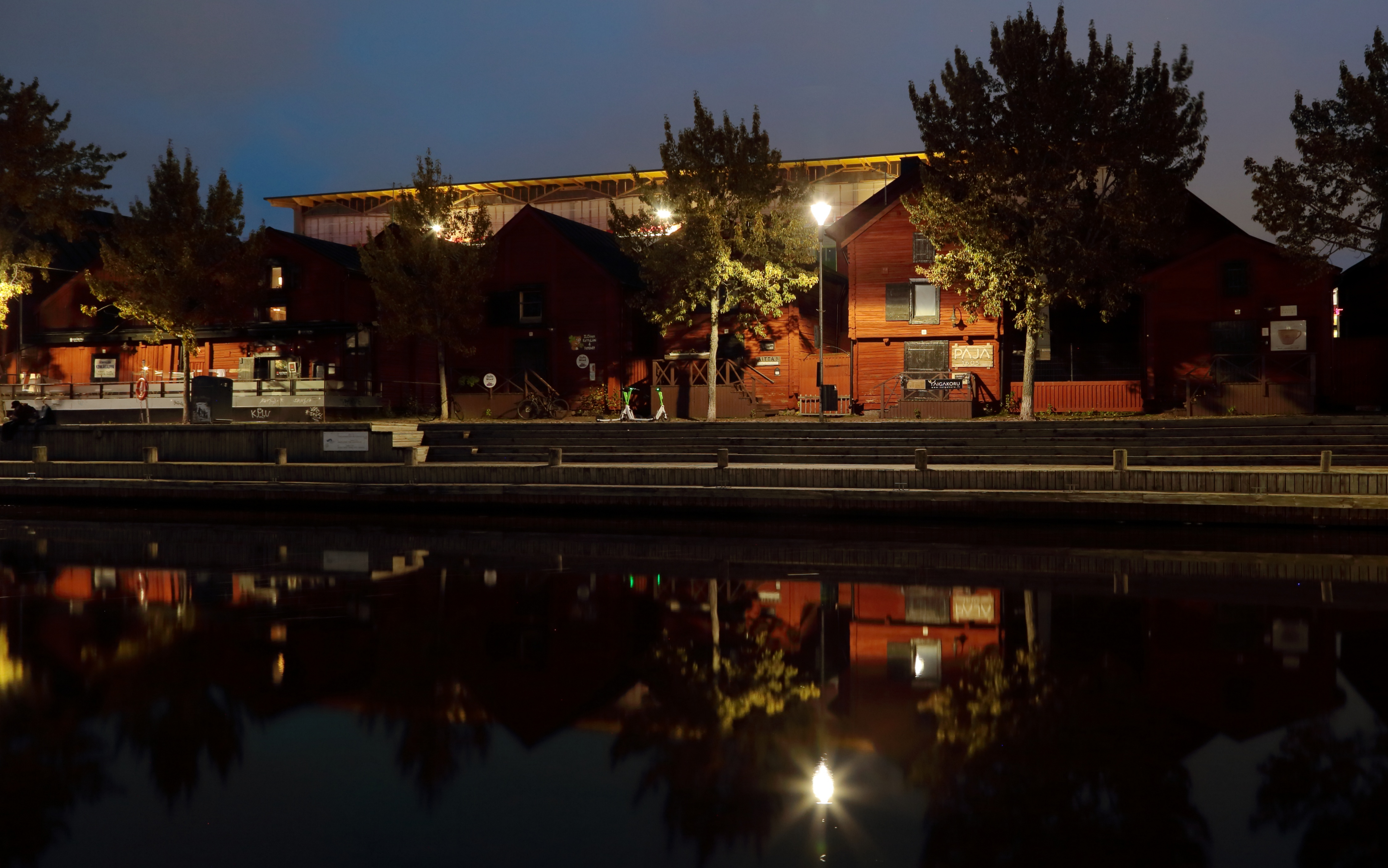
Warehouses in marketplace

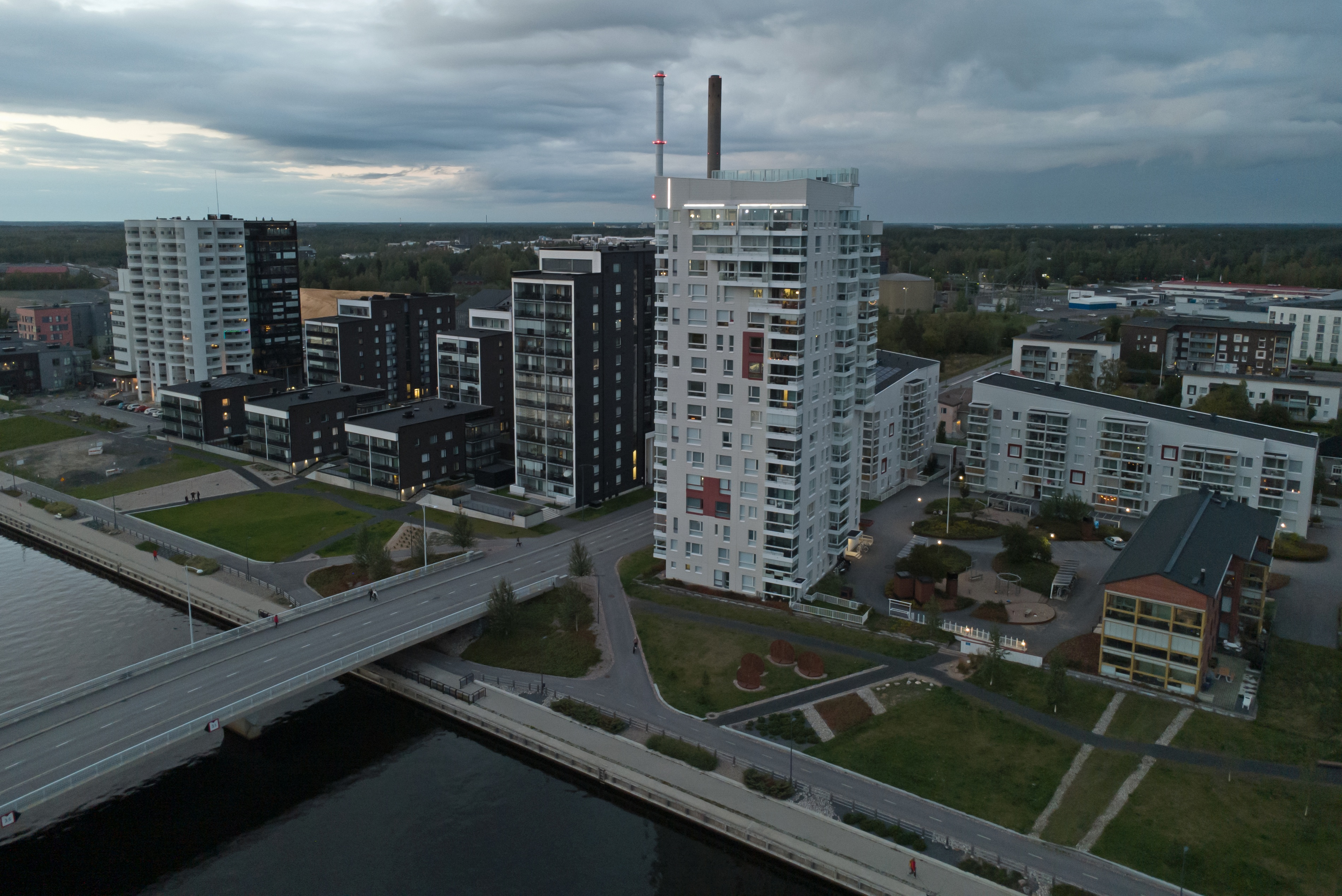
Residential area in Toppila

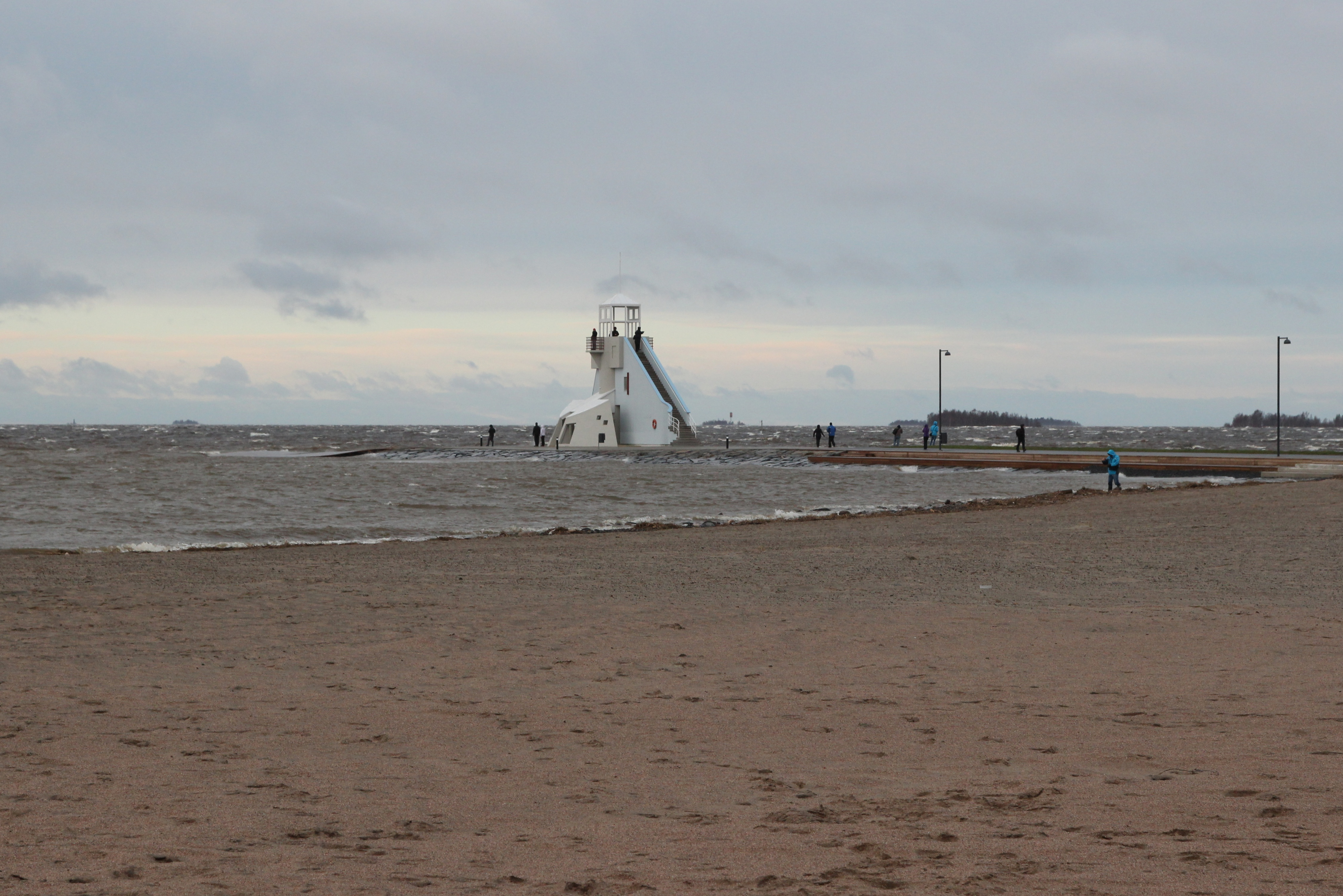
Nallikari beach

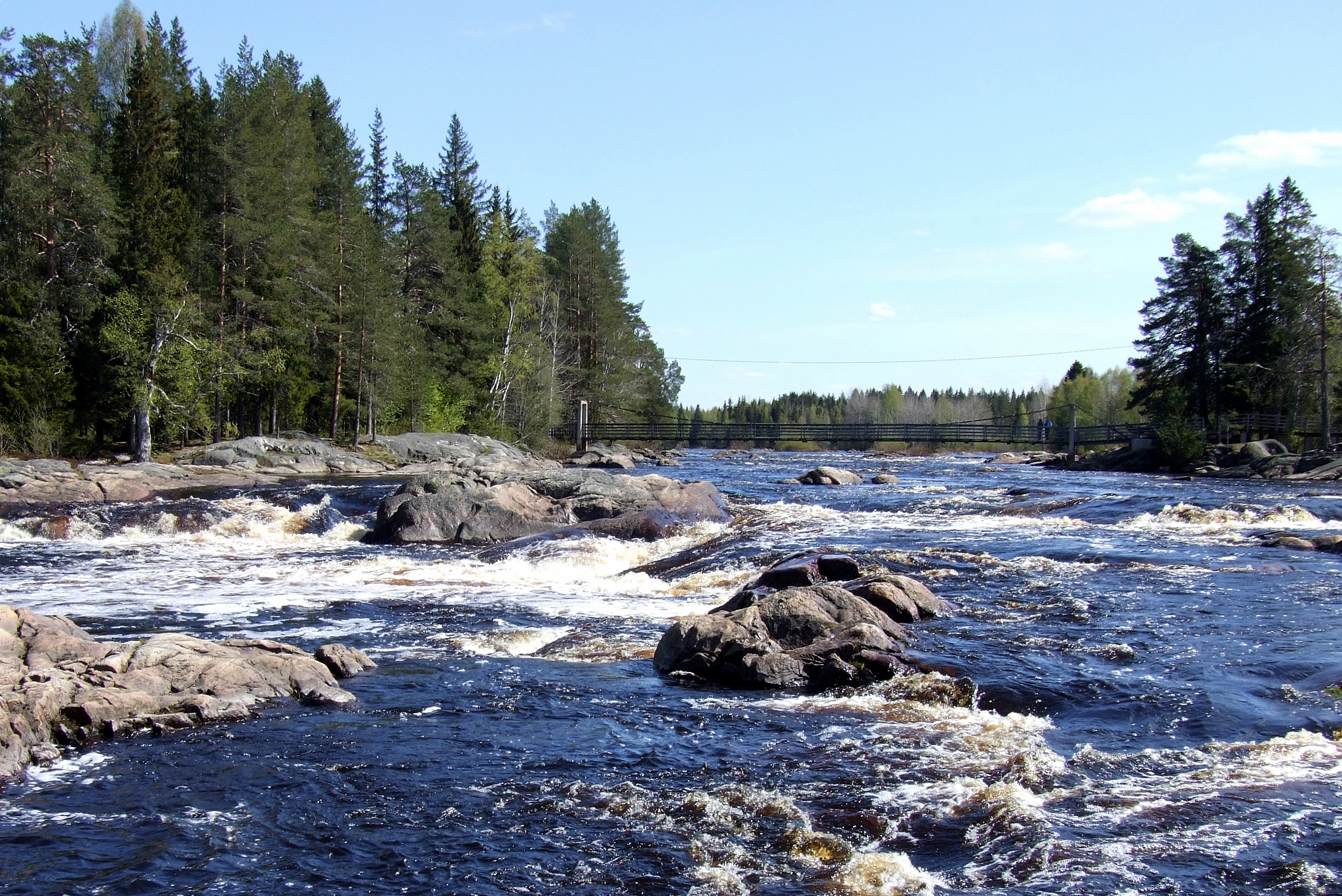
Koiteli rapids in Kiiminki

== See also ==
- Laanila Highschool
- Toppila Power Station – Power plant in Oulu, Finland
- Oulu Aircraft Hijacking – 1978 aircraft hijacking
- Lake Oulujärvi – Lake of Northern Ostrobothnia and Kainuu, Finland
