= Oulunsalo Church =

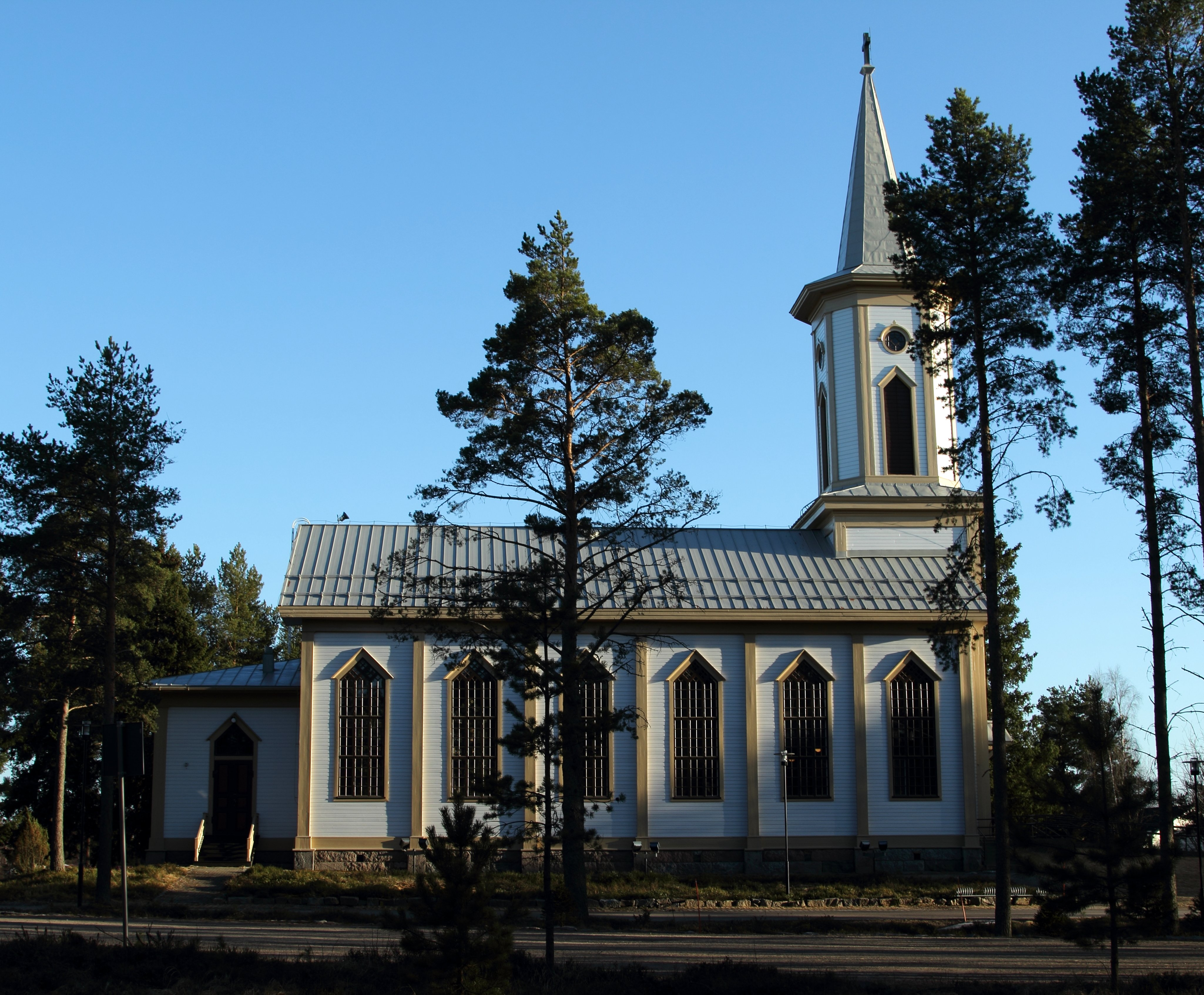
- Oulunsalo Church
- 64°56′09″N 025°25′14″E
- Location: Oulu
- Country: Finland
- Denomination: Lutheran
- Website: http://www.oulunseurakunnat.fi/oulunsalonkirkko

History
- Status: Church

Architecture
- Functional status: Active
- Architect: Julius Basilier
- Completed: 1891

Specifications
- Capacity: 500

Administration
- Diocese: Diocese of Oulu
- Parish: Oulunsalo parish

The Oulunsalo Church is an evangelical Lutheran church in the Finnish city of Oulu. It was part of the town of Oulunsalo until 2013 when that town was merged into Oulu.

The wooden church building has been designed in Gothic Revival style by architect Julius Basilier. It was built between 1888 and 1891. The former Oulunsalo church was destroyed in a fire caused by lightning in the summer 1882.
