= SK Pohjantähti =

Finnish orienteering club

SK Pohjantähti is a Finnish orienteering club in Oulu.

It won bronze in the Venla relay in 2016 with Heini Wennman, Marttiina Joensuu, Sofia Haajanen and Marika Teini.

Marika Teini, Anna Haataja and Sofia Haajanen were chosen in 2018 to represent Finland in the European and World Championships. Four of the nine best women in the Finnish Championships in middle distance in 2018 were from SK Pohjantähti, which made the club one of the favorites that year in the Venla relay. Although it was one of the two leading teams at the start of the last leg, it ended on place 12.

Pasi Ikonen is another runner that has competed for SK Pohjantähti.
