= Turkansaari =

Open-air museum in Oulu, Finland

Turkansaari Open-Air Museum
- Turkansaaren ulkomuseo
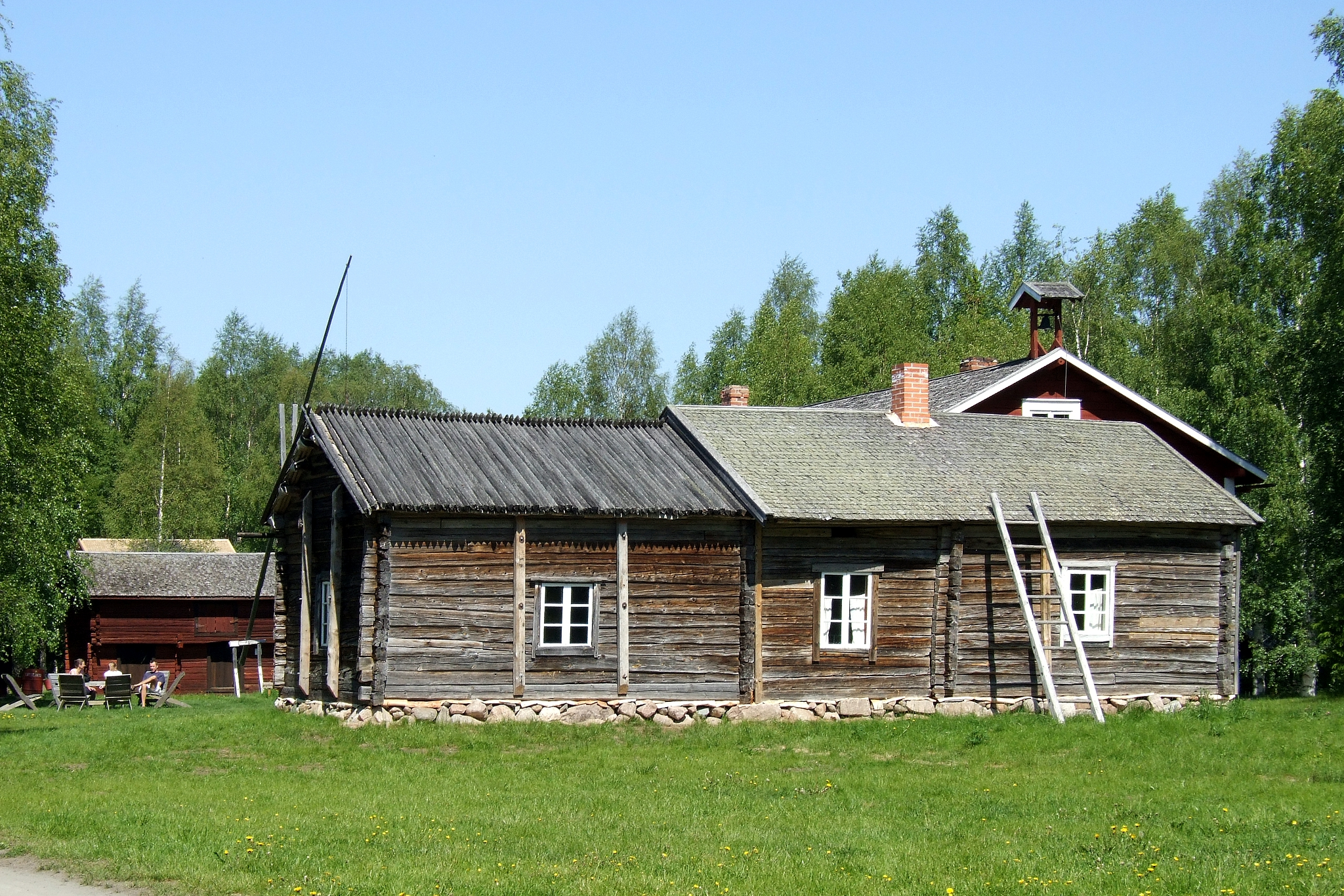
- Established: 1922
- Location: Madekoski, Oulu, Finland Turkansaarentie 165, 90310 Oulu
- Coordinates: 64.948°N 25.706°E
- Type: Open-air museum
- Website: Official website

Turkansaari is an island in the Oulujoki river with an open-air museum in the Madekoski district in Oulu, Finland. The museum is run by the Northern Ostrobothnia museum.

Turkansaari island was a marketplace for Russian traders in the Oulujoki river. The open-air museum started out when the old church, from the year 1694, was restored on the island in 1922.

Every summer there is a demonstration of burning tar in a pit to produce tar in the traditional way.
