= Market Square, Oulu =

Market square in Oulu, Finland

Coordinates: 65°0′50″N 25°27′48″E

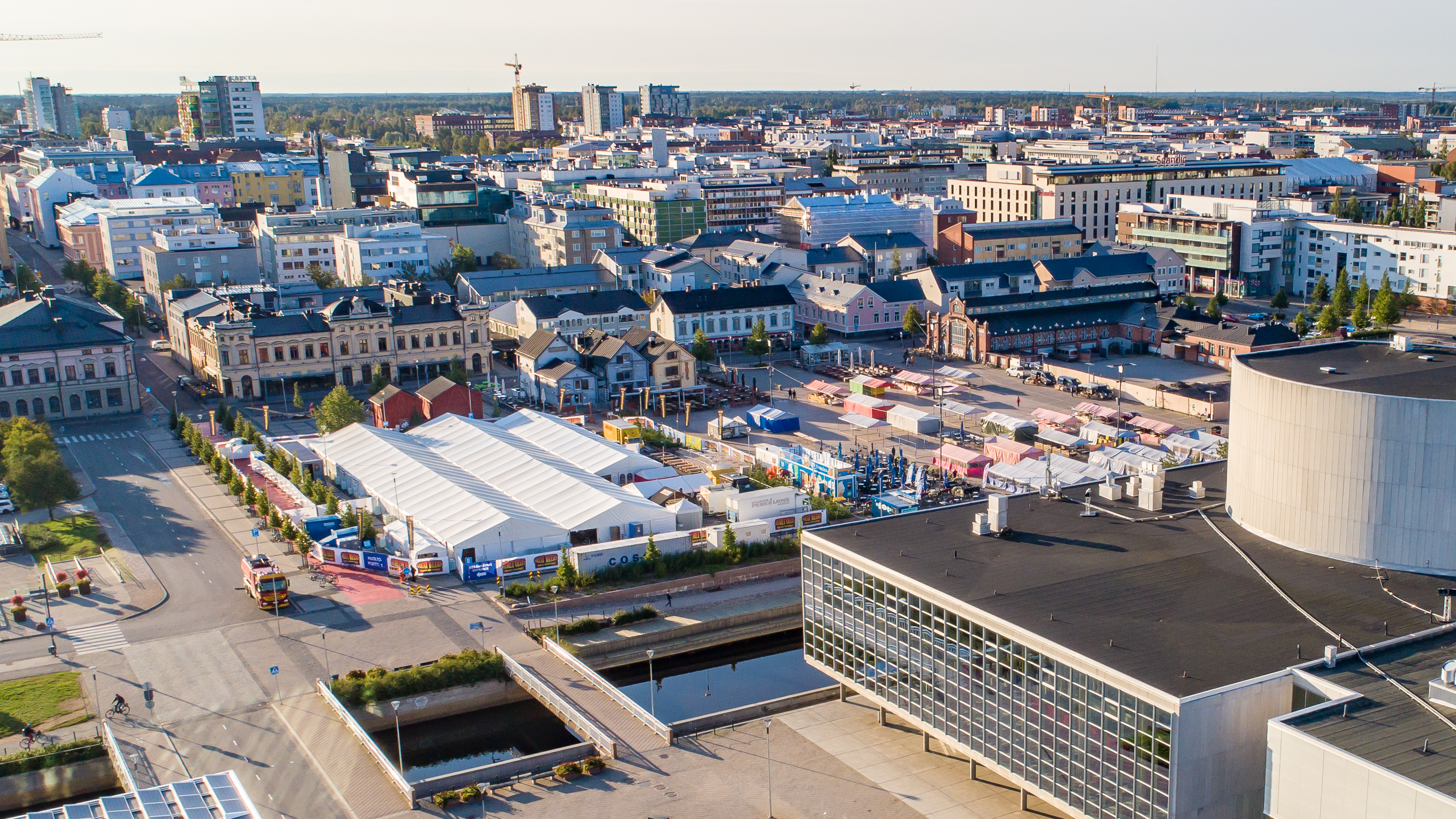
Oulu Market square.

The Oulu Market Square is the main market square of the city of Oulu, Finland.

The market square is located in the city centre, in the Pokkinen district, on the waterfront of the Oulujoki river. The Rotuaari pedestrian zone starts from the square behind the Toripolliisi statue.

In addition to the traditional market stalls, old barns painted in red color and restored as bars and restaurants are bordering the square nowadays. The historical Oulu market hall was opened on the square in 1901 mainly to get selling of meat out of the open square.

== Gallery ==
The historical Oulu market hall.	The square is filled with many cafes and restaurants	Grill/Cafe/Ice cream kiosk at the Oulu Market Square

Market square pier during summer 2007.	Cafe terrace with the Oulu theatre in the background.	An old schooner in front of the squares iconic red barn buildings.
