= Rotuaari =

Pedestrian zone in Oulu, Finland

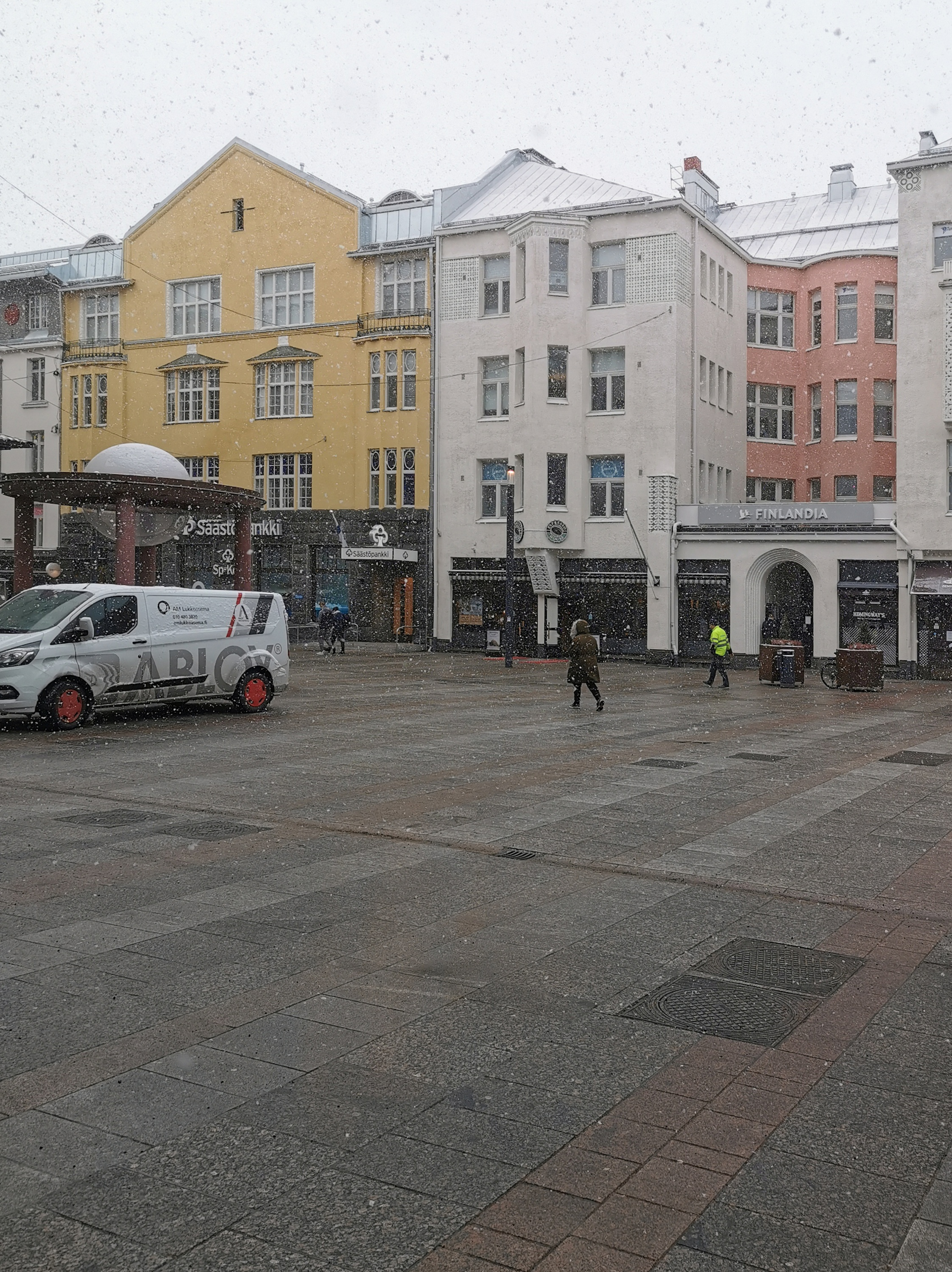
- Oulu Central Square, the main square on Rotuaari

- Location within Finland
- Part of: Kirkkokatu
- Maintained by: Oulun Liikekeskus ry
- Length: 210 m (690 ft)
- Width: 15 m (49 ft)
- Location: Pokkinen, Oulu, Finland
- Postal code: 90100
- Nearest metro station: Rotuaari P
- Coordinates: 65.01182°N 25.47018°E
- Southwest end: Saaristonkatu
- Major junctions: Kauppurienkatu
- Northeast end: Pakkahuoneenkatu

Construction
- Inauguration: 1987; 39 years ago

Other
- Known for: Oulu Central Square (Finnish: Oulun Keskusaukio)
- Status: Pedestrianised
- Website: www.ouka.fi/oulu/tapahtumat/rotuaari

The Rotuaari is a pedestrian zone in the Pokkinen district in Oulu, Finland. The area, together with the Oulu Market Square, is being managed by the Oulu City Centre Shopkeeper Association (Finnish: Oulun Liikekeskus ry).

The pedestrian zone was established in Summer 1987. The name of the zone was derived from the French word trottoir. At first part of Kirkkokatu Street was converted to pedestrian use only. Later the zone was enlarged to Kauppurienkatu Street between Isokatu Street and the Market Square. The main square of the zone is the Oulu Central Square (Finnish: Oulun Keskusaukio), where most of the festivals and other events of Rotuaari are held. In 2012, a heating system was placed under the whole length of the pedestrian part of Kirkkokatu (including the Central Square), so that it will be free of ice and snow during the winter months.
