= Raksila Artificial Ice Rink Pakkalan kenttä =

Bandy stadium in Finland

Raksila Artificial Ice Rink
- Raksilan tekojääkenttä Pakkalan kenttä
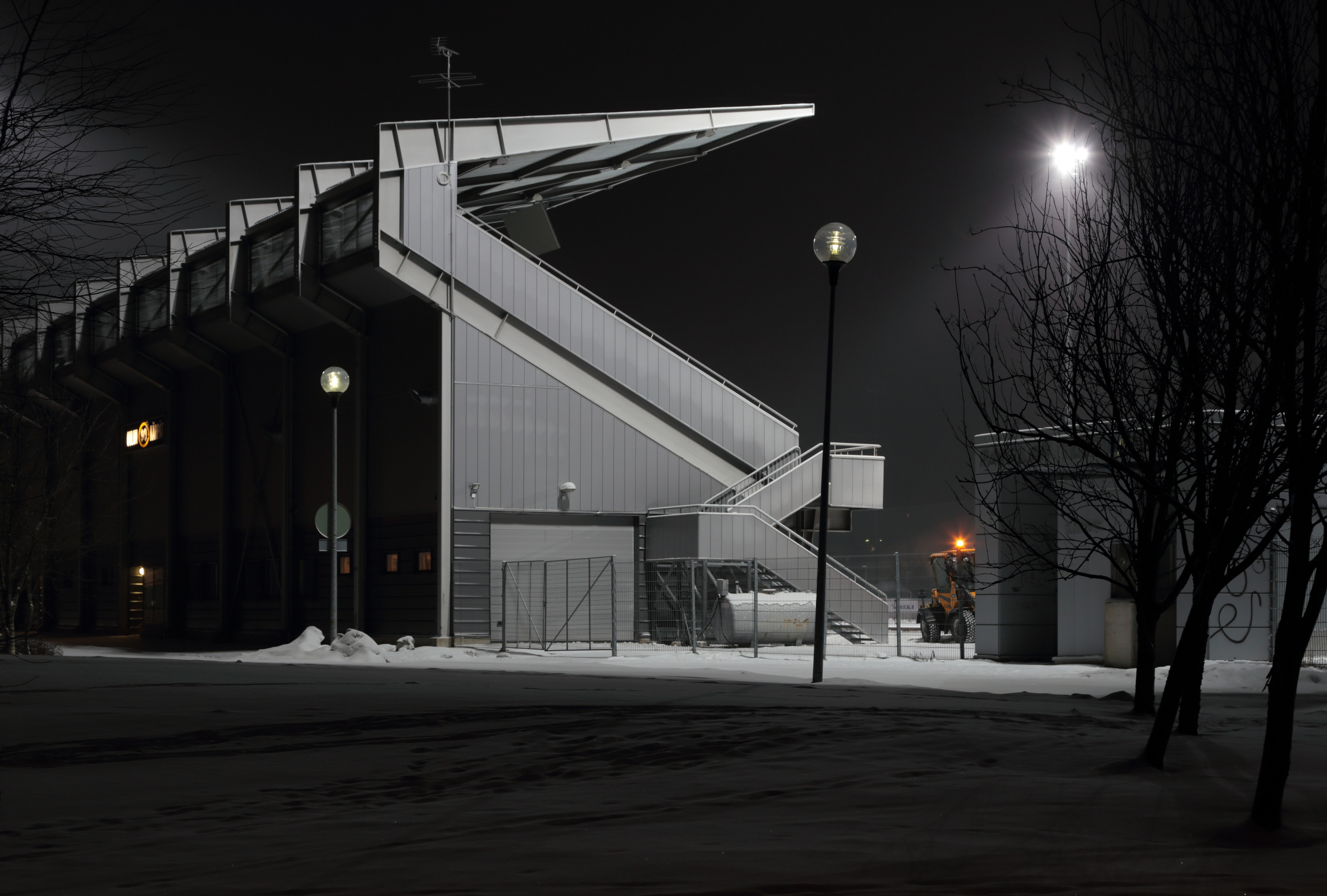
- The arena seen from the outside on a day in January 2016.
- Interactive map of Raksila Artificial Ice Rink
- Location: Oulu, Finland
- Owner: City of Oulu
- Capacity: 1,200 under roof

Tenants
- Oulun Luistinseura; IFK Uleåborg; Lennex BK

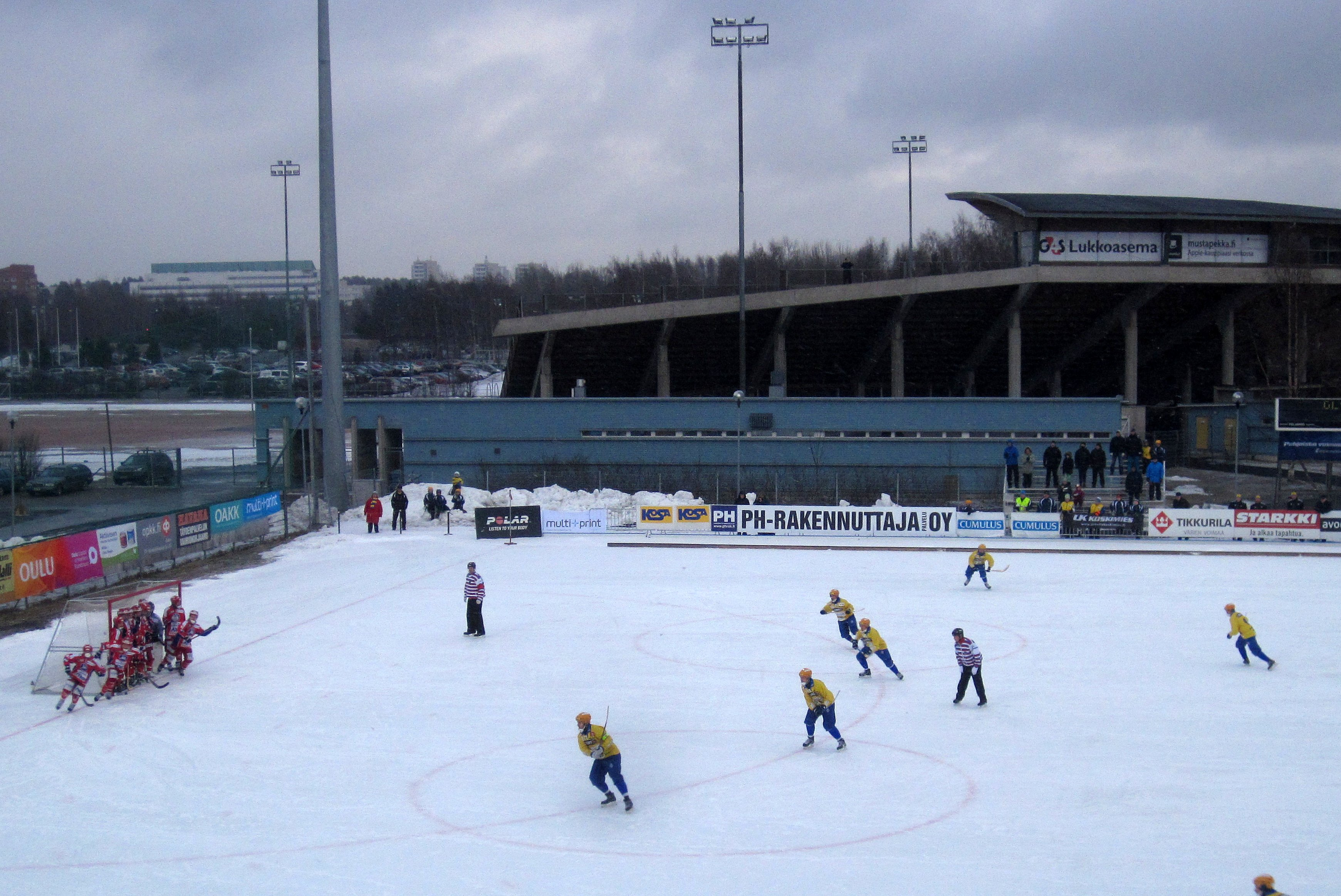
The Finnish national bandy championship final in 2014, played at the Raksila Artificial Ice Rink Pakkalan kenttä arena in Oulu. OLS shoots a corner stroke.

Raksila Artificial Ice Rink Pakkalan kenttä, also called Raksilan tekojääkenttä or just Pakkala, is a bandy field in the district of Raksila in Oulu, Finland. It also serves as a speed skating arena and in the summer it is used for basketball and roller skating.

The arena is home field for the local bandy clubs including Oulun Luistinseura (OLS).

Preceded by Trud Stadium; Arkhangelsk, Russia	Bandy World Championship; Final Venue; 2001	Succeeded by Trud Stadium; Arkhangelsk, Russia
