= OYUS Rugby =

- Full name: Oulun Yliopiston Urheiluseura Rugby
- Nickname(s): Oulu Rugby Club
- Founded: 2002
- Location: Oulu, Finland
Team kit

OYUS Rugby (Oulun Yliopiston Urheiluseura, Oulu University Sports Club) is a Finnish rugby club in Oulu, founded in 2002. In 2020 the club discontinued and changed its name to Oulu Rugby Club. Oulu Rugby men 15's played in the 1st division in 2020 and 2021 and in 2022 they will also play 7's. Oulu started a women's team in 2021, but did not have enough players to make a full team. But for the 2022 season Oulu women will have their own team and play 7's and 15's in Division 1. Oulu is also trying to encourage youth to start playing rugby.
