= Toripolliisi =

Sculpture in Oulu, Finland

Coordinates: 65°00′48″N 25°27′53″E

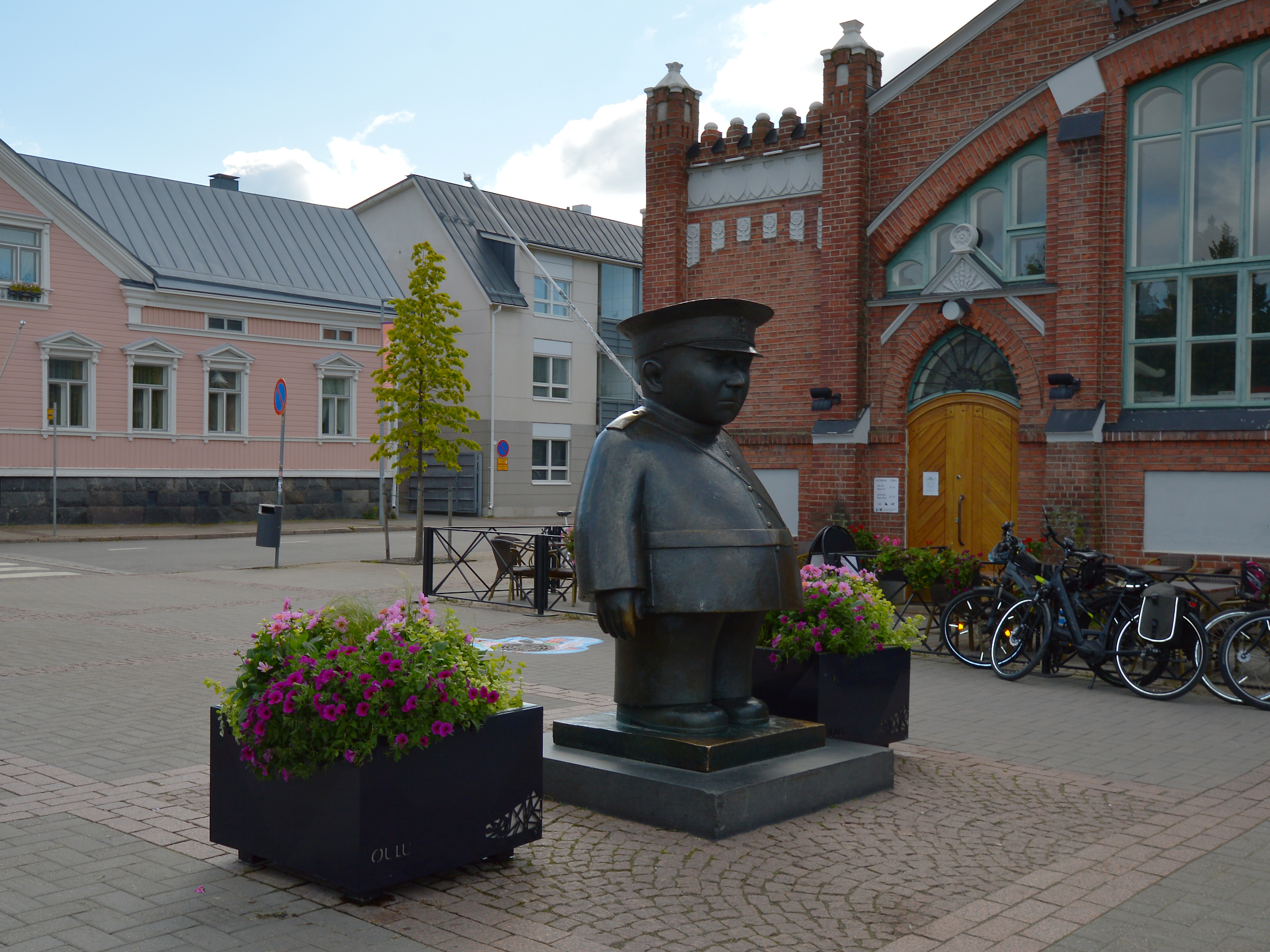

Toripolliisi (The Bobby at the Market Place in English) is a bronze sculpture located at the market square in Oulu, Finland. It was made by sculptor Kaarlo Mikkonen in 1987. The sculpture measures 220×150×112 centimetres (86.6×59×44 inches), and it was named in honour of the bobbies that once patrolled the market place. The sculpture was funded with the help of a public fund raising started in 1985, and it was revealed in September 1987.
