= Ornis Fennica =

- Discipline: Ornithology
- Language: English
- Edited by: Céline Arzel, Elina Mäntylä, Mia Rönkä

Publication details
- History: 1924–present
- Publisher: BirdLife Finland (Finland)
- Frequency: Quarterly
- Open access: Yes
- Impact factor: 1.2 (2024)

Standard abbreviations
- ISO 4: Ornis Fenn.

Indexing
- ISSN: 0030-5685

Links
- Journal homepage

Ornis Fennica is a peer-reviewed open access scholarly journal publishing research articles on the ecology, behaviour, biogeography and conservation of birds. It is a journal published by BirdLife Finland. The current editor-in-chief's are Céline Arzel, Elina Mäntylä and Mia Rönkä.

== Abstracting and indexing ==
The journal is abstracted and indexed in:

- Biological Abstracts
- BIOSIS Previews
- Essential Science Indicators
- Science Citation Index Expanded
- Scopus
- Zoological Record
