= Juhannusjuusto =

Finnish cheese dish

- Alternative names: Makiajuusto
- Type: Dessert
- Place of origin: Ostrobothnia
- Main ingredients: Full-fat milk, rennet

Juhannusjuusto or makiajuusto (lit. Midsummer cheese or sweet cheese) is an Ostrobothnian dish which is also called red whey and cheese soup. Like the name suggests it is eaten during Midsummer and more widely in the summer season.

The sweet cheese floating in the red whey is eaten as a dessert, usually cold. Sugar can be added according to one's taste. Full-fat milk and rennet are used as ingredients. The cheese takes multiple hours to prepare, thus being mainly served only on special occasions.
