= Pieksämäki railway station =

Railway station in Pieksämäki, Finland

Pieksämäki
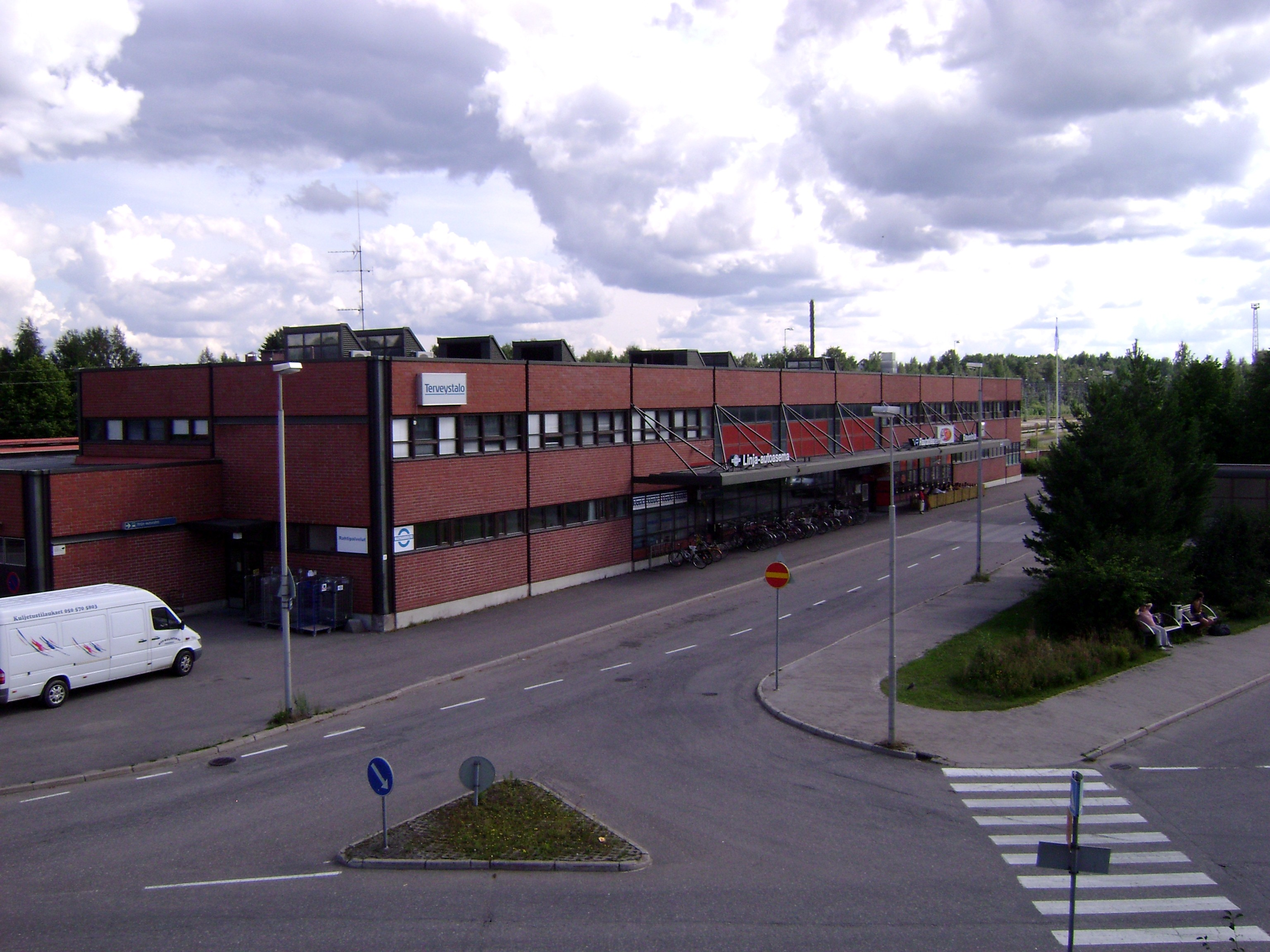
- Pieksämäki railway station

General information
- Location: Asemakatu 2, 76100; Pieksämäki; Finland
- Coordinates: 62°18′05″N 027°10′00″E
- System: VR station
- Owner: Finnish Transport Infrastructure Agency
- Lines: Kouvola–Iisalmi railway Jyväskylä–Pieksämäki railway Pieksämäki–Joensuu railway
- Platforms: 4

Construction
- Structure type: ground station
- Parking: yes
- Cycle facilities: yes

History
- Opened: 1 October 1889
- Rebuilt: 1981

Services
| Preceding station | VR Group | Following station |
|---|---|---|
| Mikkeli towards Kouvola | Kouvola–Iisalmi | Suonenjoki towards Iisalmi |
| Hankasalmi towards Jyväskylä | Jyväskylä–Pieksämäki | Terminus |
| Terminus | Pieksämäki–Joensuu | Varkaus towards Joensuu |
Location

The Pieksämäki railway station is located in the town of Pieksämäki, Finland. The station has been in use since the track to Savonia was built in 1889.

== History ==
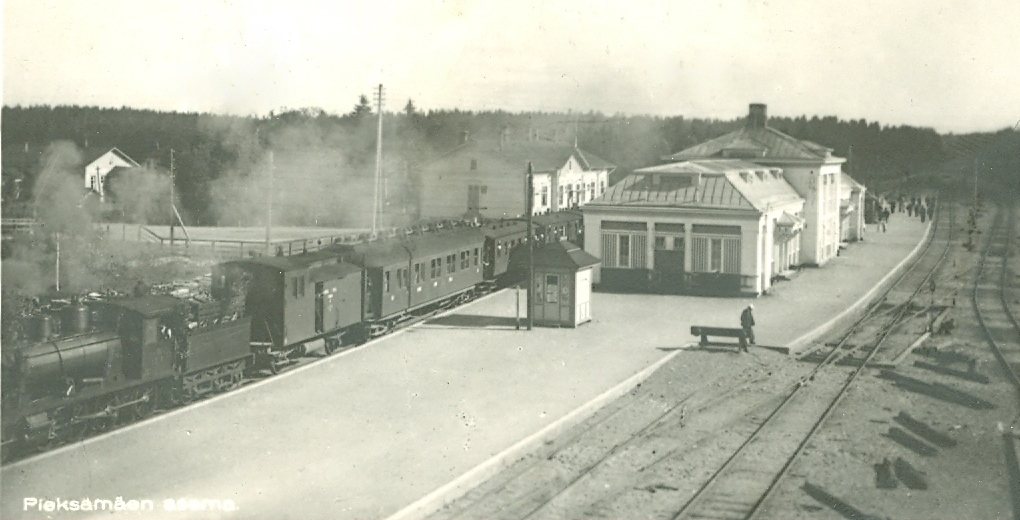
The original station building and restaurant in a 1925 postcard.

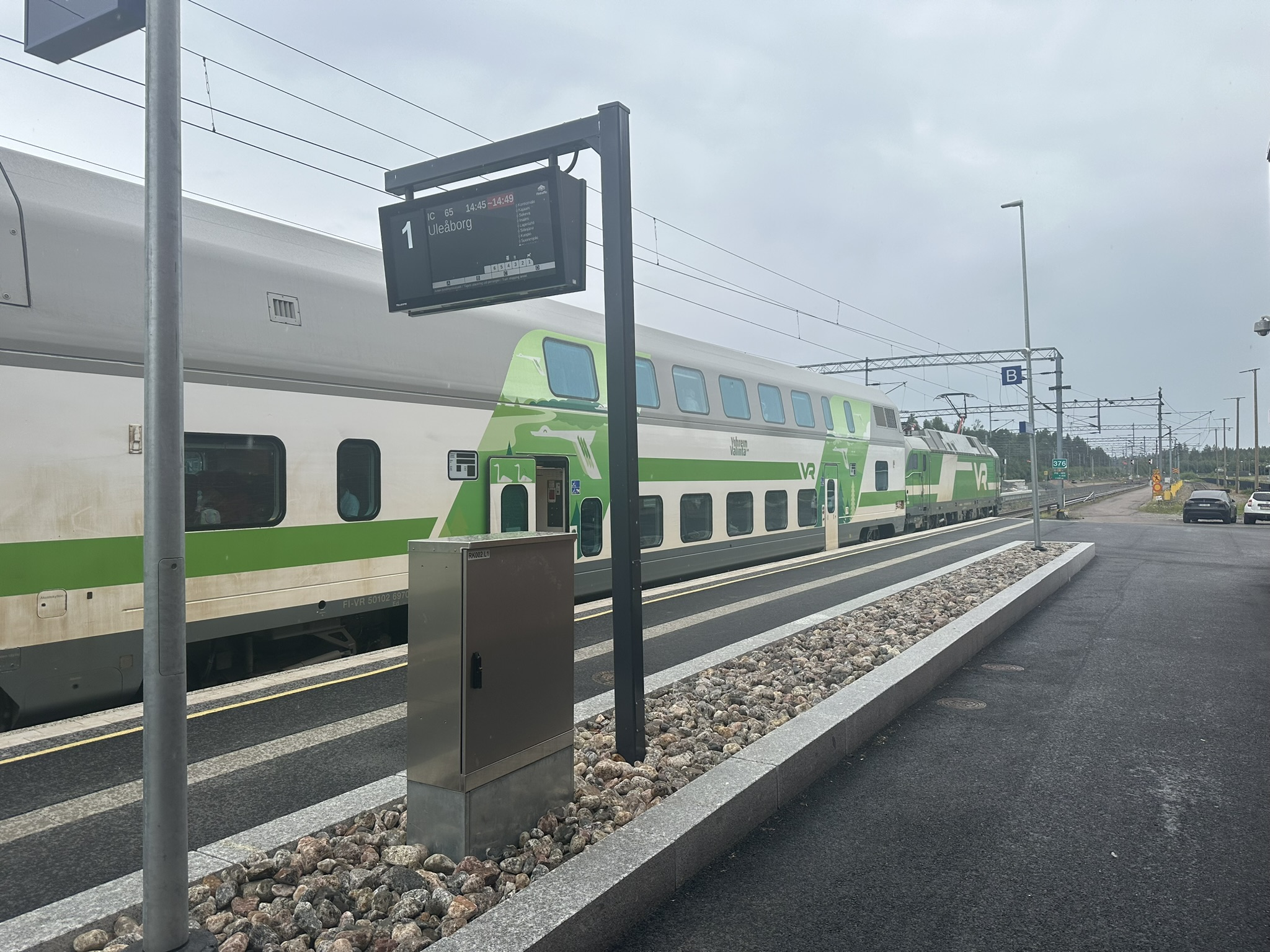
InterCity train hauled by an Sr3 electric locomotive stopped at the station.

In the 1880s, the village of Pieksämäki was located west of the current site of the town at Tienristi, currently known as Yläristi, and so the people of the municipality would have wanted the track to go west of Pieksänjärvi. However, because of cost reasons, in 1885 the government decided to build the track east of the lake, bringing the station a couple of kilometres east of the village, in the middle of an uninhabited swamp. The first station building was very modest. The stations were divided into five classes in order of importance, with class 1 being the most important; originally, Pieksämäki was of class 4 station. The village of Haapakoski located near Pieksämäki also received its own station, of class 5. Originally, cargo traffic was more important, and there was only passenger traffic to Mikkeli and Kuopio. Nevertheless, people started moving near the station, attracted by the railroad.

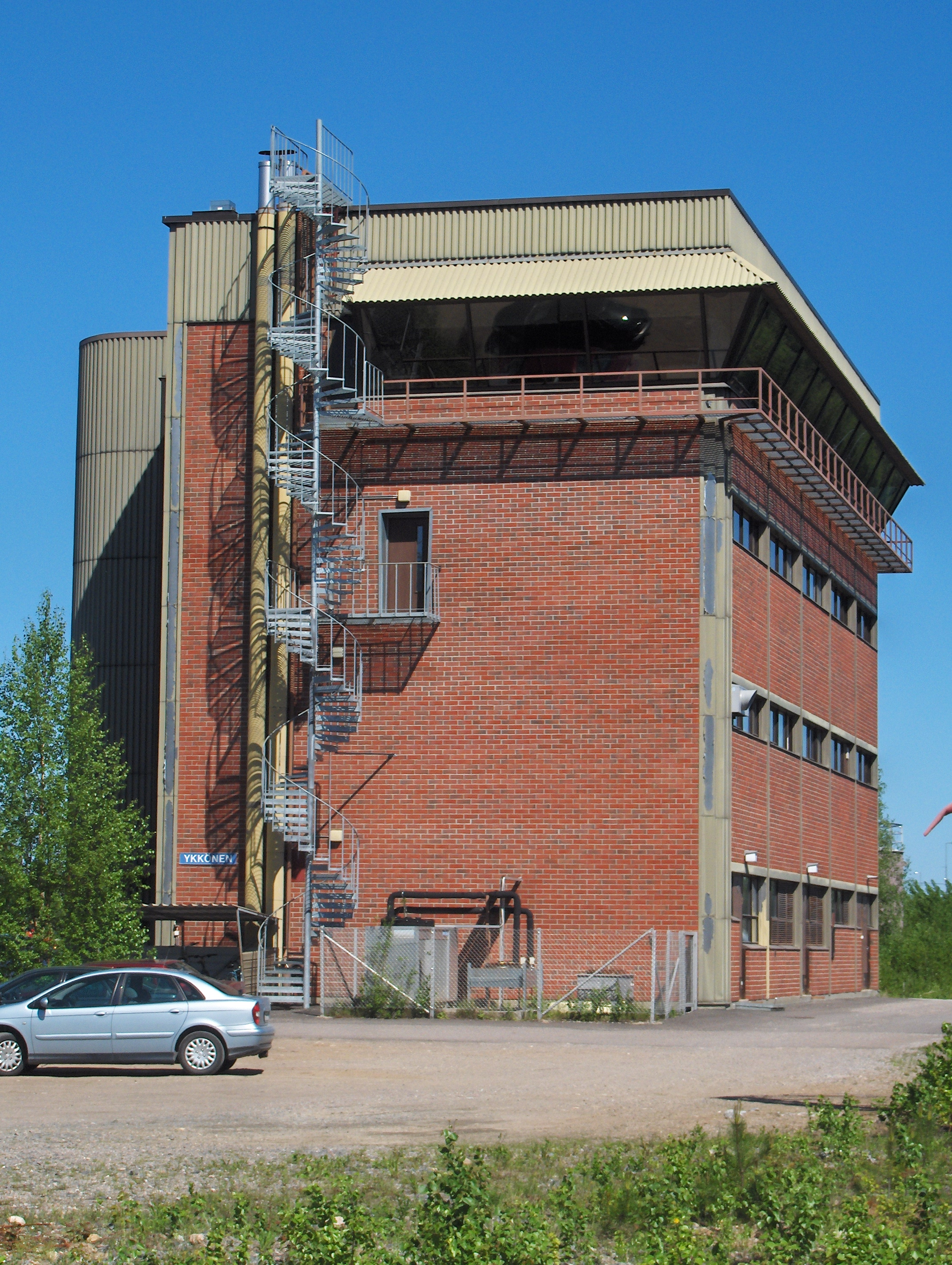
The Pieksämäki traffic control center.

The representatives of the Pieksämäki area, most importantly Aapeli Häyrinen, were strong supporters of the Savonia railway, and were also present in the discussion of a perpendicular track in the early 20th century. The track would combine the parallel tracks of Ostrobothnia, Savonia and Karelia, but there was controversy about the actual layout. When Savonlinna received a railway connection from the east in 1908, the situation was clarified, and the track between Savonlinna and Pieksämäki was built in 1914. At the same time, a side track from Huutokoski to Varkaus was built, and the Pieksämäki station became more important, of class 3. Already at this time, there was an agreement on the best western layout for the perpendicular track (the Pieksämäki station had faced competition from a track between Suonenjoki and Suolahti), and so the track was extended from Pieksämäki towards Jyväskylä, being completed by the time of Finland's independence and the Finnish Civil War in 1918. Having thus become a crossing point in the Finnish railway network, the Pieksämäki station was promoted to class 2.

Completing the perpendicular track meant a rise of importance for the Pieksämäki station, and it soon got its own restaurant. The proximity of the railroad had also resulted in another habitation centre near the station, and in the 1920s, it outgrew the old Tienristi, thus becoming the centre of the area. The separate Pieksämäki village became a market town called Pieksämä in 1930, but the Finnish Railway Institute did not rename the station. Later, the city council changed its mind, and Pieksämä was renamed back to Pieksämäki in 1948. During World War II, the important crossing point station was the target of many bombings, and the station restaurant also burned down. Nevertheless, traffic increased both during and after the war. This was partly because of a track between Varkaus and Joensuu, built in 1940.

Pieksämäki became a central place for the VR Group, receiving a repair shop and a depot. The trackyard is one of the largest in Finland, over 6 kilometres long, with almost 100 kilometres of track.

The current central traffic station at Pieksämäki was completed in 1981. Pieksämäki is the terminus for many passenger trains, and all trains passing it also stop at the station. It is nowadays a control station, because traffic control in the nearby railway traffic points are handled remotely from Pieksämäki.

== Services ==
Pieksämäki railway station is served by all long-distance trains that travel via the Savonia railway from Helsinki to Kuopio, Kajaani and Oulu. There are also long-distance train connections to Helsinki via Jyväskylä and Tampere as well as some railbus services to Joensuu.

There is also bus traffic from the station.

== Departure tracks ==
Pieksämäki railway station has four platform tracks numbered 1, 3, 4 and 6.

- Track 1 is used by the first two morning services via Kouvola to Helsinki as well as by some northbound trains towards Kuopio.
- Track 3 is used by train services via Jyväskylä and Tampere to Helsinki as well as one train to Kuopio.
- Track 4 is used by the majority of the train services travelling via the Savonia railway into both directions (towards Kouvola and towards Kuopio), as well as by one evening train towards Tampere and one railbus service to Joensuu.
- Track 6 is used by railbus services to Joensuu.

== In popular culture ==
The Pieksämäki station is a prominent element of the Juice Leskinen song "Bluesia Pieksämäen asemalla". The song is written from the perspective of a lone musician arriving to the station from Mikkeli, who then begins playing an improvised blues with accompaniment from an imaginary band to pass the time while waiting for his next train.
