= Hillosensalmi railway station =

Railway station in Kouvola, Finland

Hillosensalmi
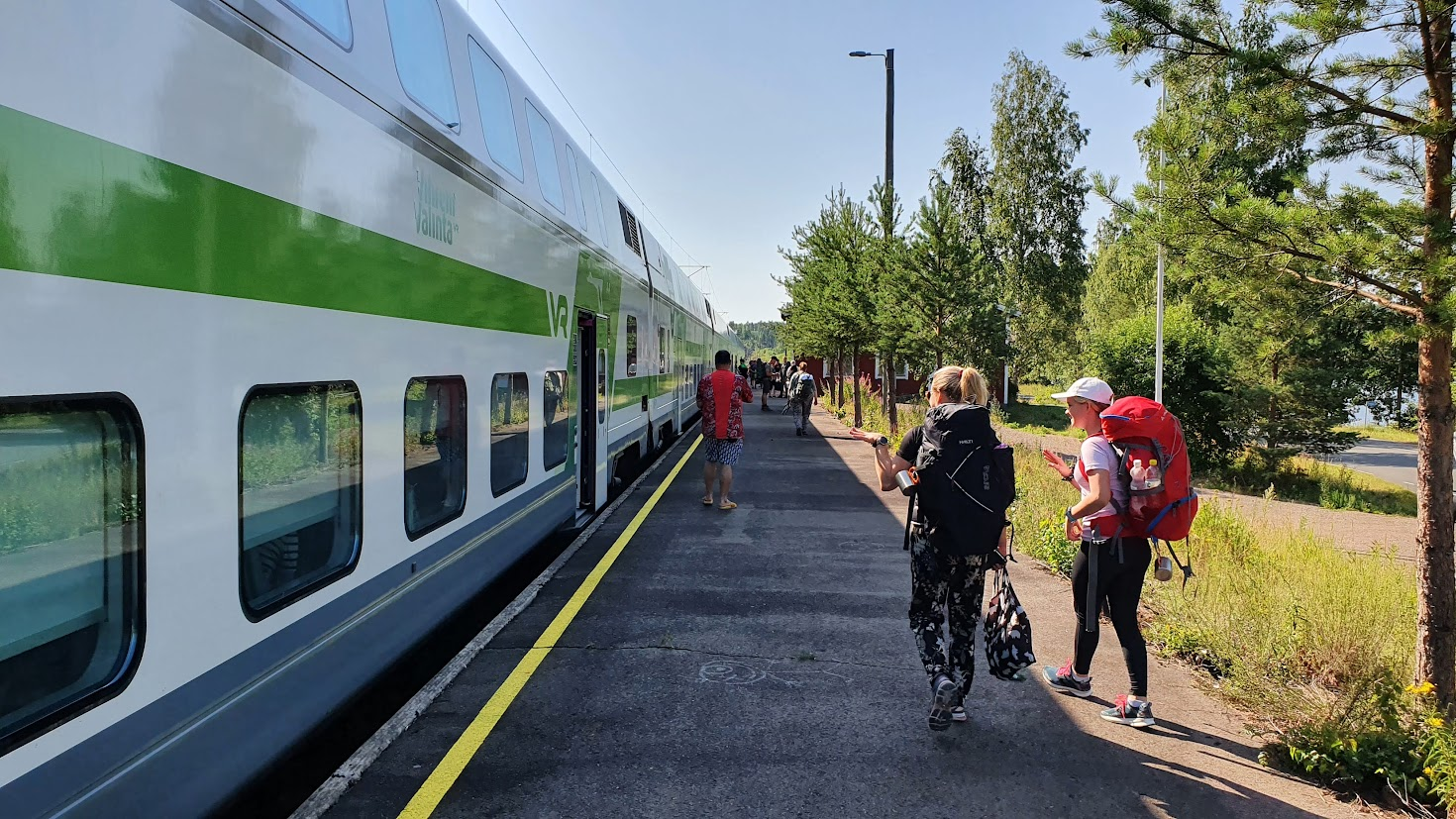
- IC 63 stopped at Hillosensalmi in 2022

General information
- Location: Kouvola; Finland
- Coordinates: 61.2°N 26.79°E
- System: VR station
- Owner: Finnish Transport Infrastructure Agency
- Operator: VR Group
- Line: Kouvola–Iisalmi

Other information
- Station code: Hls
Location

The Hillosensalmi railway station (Finnish: Hillosensalmen rautatieasema) is located in Hillosensalmi, Kouvola, Finland, near Repovesi National Park. It is on the Savonia railway line, and its neighboring stations are Mäntyharju in the north and Kouvola in the south.

Since 2022 two daily VR InterCity trains, one in each direction, have stopped at the station during the summer months. Regular regional train service was abolished in June 2002.
