= Mäntyharju railway station =

Railway station in Mäntyharju, Finland

Mäntyharju
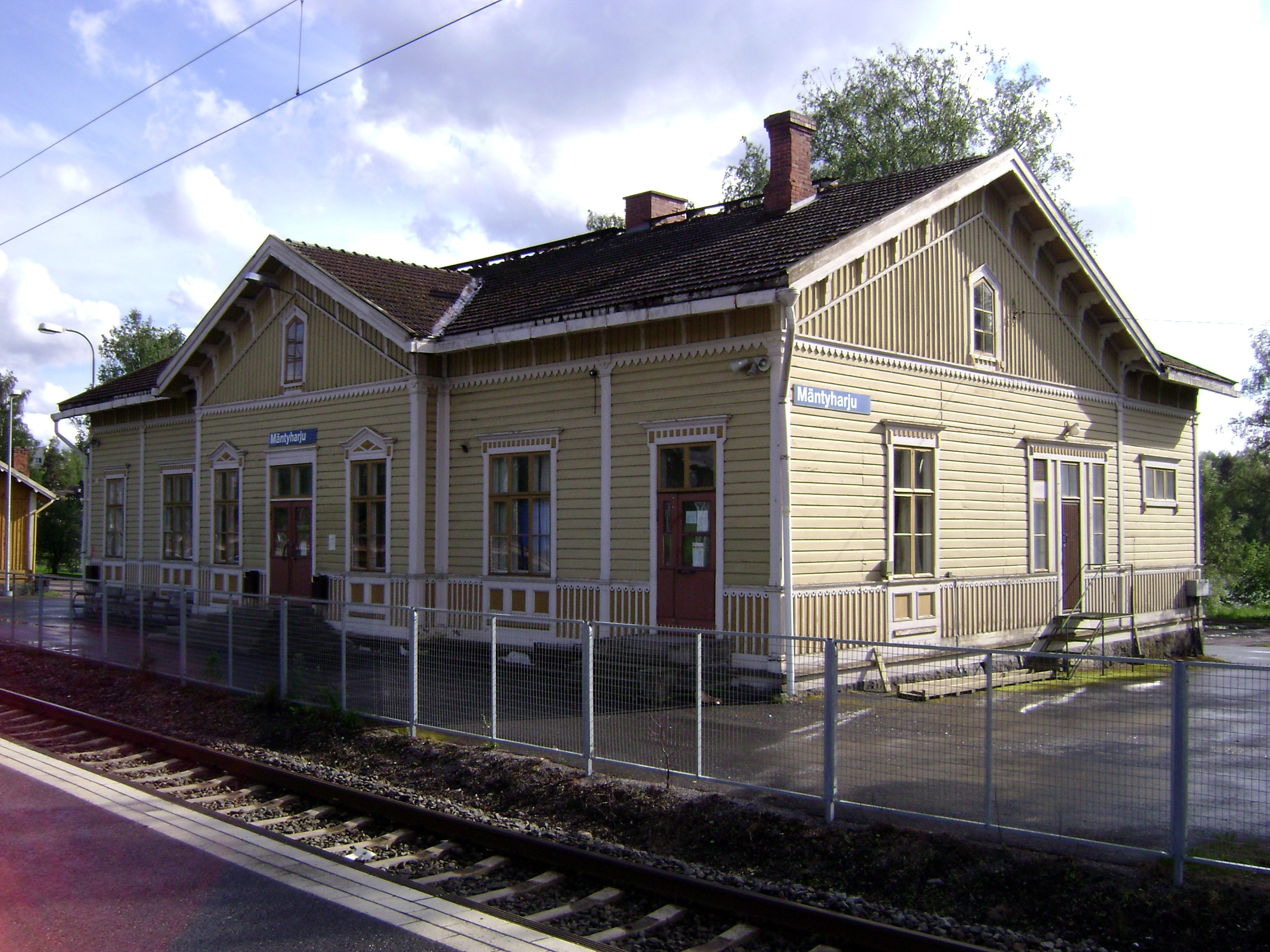

General information
- Location: Asematie 10, 52700; Mäntyharju; Finland
- Coordinates: 61°25′17″N 026°52′53″E
- System: VR station
- Owner: Finnish Transport Infrastructure Agency
- Operator: VR Group
- Line: Kouvola–Iisalmi
- Platforms: 1 island platform
- Tracks: 2 (with platforms)

Construction
- Structure type: At-grade

Other information
- Station code: Mr
- Classification: Operating point

History
- Opened: 1 October 1889

Passengers
- 2008: 66,000

Services
Preceding station	VR Group	Following station
Kouvola Terminus	Kouvola–Iisalmi	Mikkeli towards Iisalmi
Location
- Location within South Savo Location within Finland

The Mäntyharju railway station (Finnish: Mäntyharjun rautatieasema, Swedish: Mäntyharju järnvägsstation) is located in the municipality and central urban area of Mäntyharju, Finland. It is located along the Kouvola–Iisalmi railway, and its neighboring stations are Kouvola in the south and Mikkeli in the north.

The Finnish Heritage Agency has declared the Mäntyharju station area a protected culture site of national importance.

== Services and departure tracks ==
Mäntyharju is served by long-distance services (InterCity and Pendolino) that pass through the Kouvola-Iisalmi line.

Mäntyharju railway station has two platform tracks and the passenger trains that stop at the station mainly use track 2. When two passenger trains meet at the station, southbound trains to Helsinki use track 1 and northbound trains towards Kuopio use track 2.
