= Lapinlahti railway station =

Railway station in Lapinlahti, Finland

Coordinates: 63°21′39″N 27°23′39″E

Lapinlahti
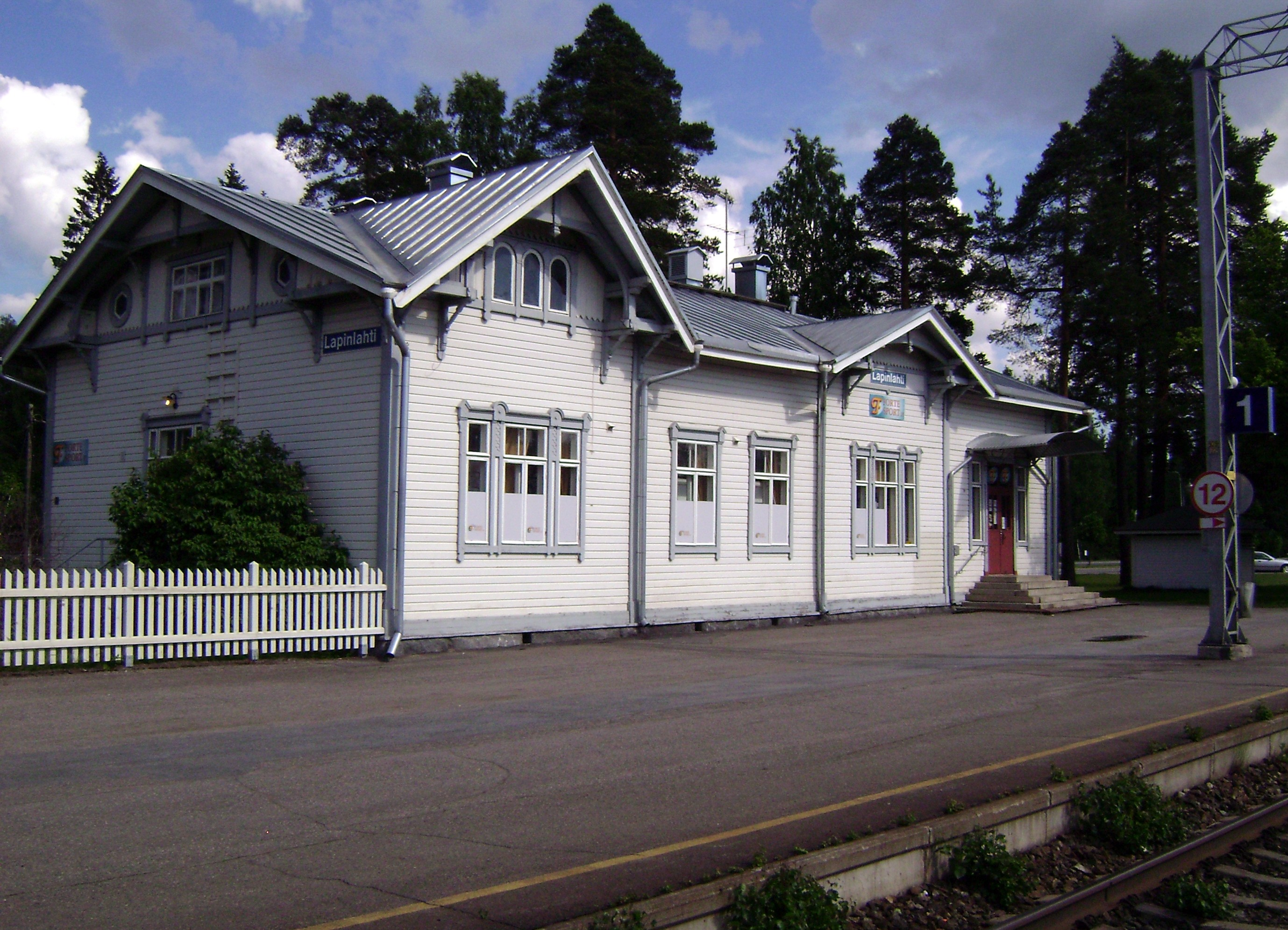

General information
- Location: Asematie 24, 73100 Lapinlahti
- System: VR station
- Owner: Finnish Transport Agency
- Platforms: 2

Construction
- Structure type: Ground station

History
- Opened: 1902
Location

Lapinlahti railway station (Finnish: Lapinlahden rautatieasema) is located in the municipality of Lapinlahti in the Northern Savonia region of Finland. Opened in 1902, the station is located on the Savonia railway.

The Finnish Heritage Agency has classified Lapinlahti railway station as a nationally significant built cultural environment.

== History ==
Lapinlahti railway station was opened on July 1, 1902, as the railway between Kuopio and Iisalmi was completed. The station building designed by Bruno Granholm was completed in the same year and was expanded in 1927.

Lapinlahti railway station was a significant location in Rautatie, the first novel by Finnish author Juhani Aho published in 1884, despite the fact that the book predates the actual real-life railway station by years.

== Services ==
Lapinlahti is served by all of the long-distance train services that travel via the Savonia railway from Helsinki to Kajaani and Oulu.

== Departure tracks ==
Lapinlahti railway station has two platform tracks. The majority of the train that stop at the station use track 1. Currently the only exception to this occurs on the afternoon after 1 PM, when two passenger trains meet at the station: InterCity IC 63 to Oulu via Kajaani on track 1 and InterCity IC 68 to Helsinki on track 2.
