= Mikkeli railway station =

Railway station in Mikkeli, Finland

Mikkeli S:t Michel
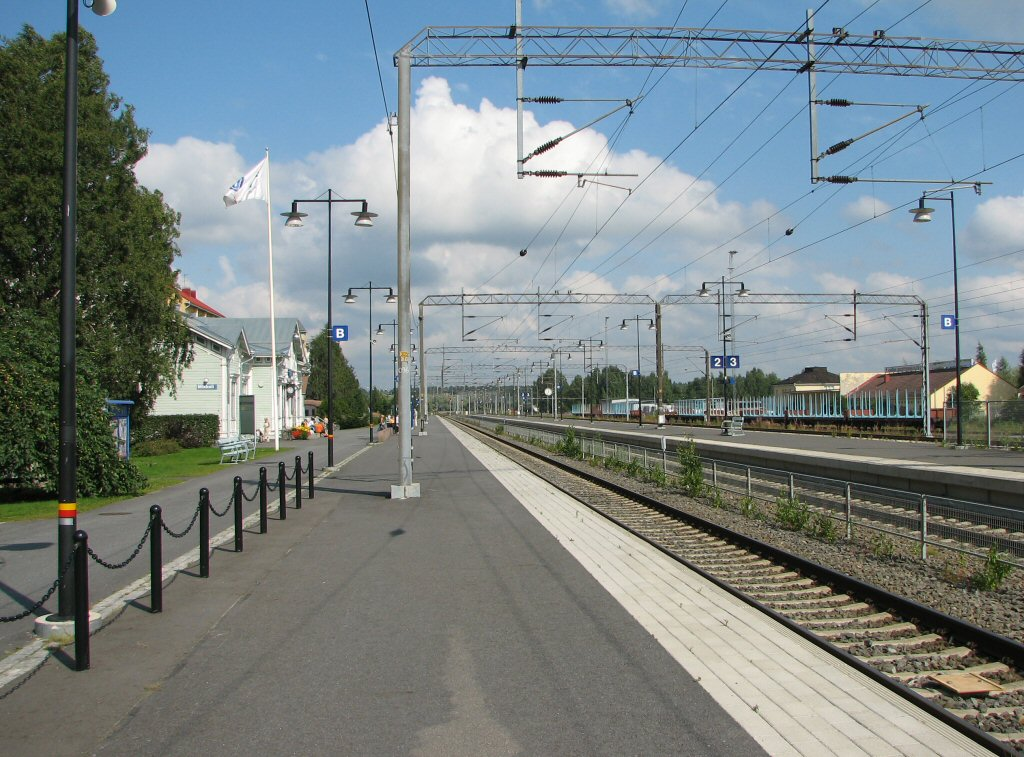

General information
- Location: Mannerheimintie, 50100; Savilahti, Mikkeli; Finland
- Coordinates: 61°41′17″N 027°16′39″E
- System: VR station
- Owner: Finnish Transport Infrastructure Agency
- Operator: VR Group
- Line: Kouvola–Iisalmi
- Platforms: 1 side platform 1 island platform

Other information
- Station code: Mi
- Classification: Operating point

History
- Opened: 1 October 1889

Passengers
- 2008: 286,000

Services
Preceding station	VR Group	Following station
Mäntyharju towards Kouvola	Kouvola–Iisalmi	Pieksämäki towards Iisalmi
Location

The Mikkeli railway station (Finnish: Mikkelin rautatieasema, Swedish: S:t Michels järnvägsstation) is located in the city and central urban area of Mikkeli, Finland. It is located along the Kouvola–Iisalmi railway, and its neighboring stations are Mäntyharju in the south and Pieksämäki in the north.

The Finnish Heritage Agency has proclaimed the Mikkeli station a nationally significant built cultural environment.

== History ==
Even before the construction of the Savo railway, the city of Mikkeli played a significant role in the plans for railways in the Grand Duchy of Finland: for example, in 1872, a plan for a line that would connect Vaasa to Saint Petersburg via Jyväskylä and Simola was drafted. In the next decade, the plans for the Savo railway started to take form, in which Mikkeli would have housed a junction station for a south-north line through eastern Finland. The southern terminus was to be Taavetti, and in Mikkeli, the line would split in two branches: one towards Jyväskylä in the west, and another towards Kuopio further north. In the end, the Savo line toward Kuopio was built starting from Kouvola with Mikkeli becoming just an intermediate station, as the Jyväskylä branch was set to begin from Pieksämäki instead.

In the planning stages of the Savo railway as it is known today, the line was originally planned to cut through western Mikkeli, but in 1886, it was decided to have it run through the eastern side instead. This made it possible to connect the railway to the Mikkeli harbour on lake Saimaa, as well as to allow the city center to expand more naturally in the future. Work on the railway began in 1887, and the line was opened for traffic on 1 October 1889, all the way from Kouvola to Kuopio.

== Architecture ==
The blueprints for the Mikkeli station building were accepted by the Finnish Senate on 16 March 1888, and like the rest of the stations on the Savo railway, were based on those of the stock stations on the Vaasa and Oulu lines. It was completed in 1889, and was expanded in 1902 and again in 1925. Its appearance has changed significantly over the years; for example, the open porch facing the railway was closed up, and the ornamental details on the roof were removed.

The south side of the rail yard houses a roundhouse that at its largest had capacity for ten locomotives. To the west of the station building is a railway workers' residential building, completed in 1922, as well as a temporary station from the wartime era.

== Services ==
Mikkeli is served by all InterCity and Pendolino trains that use the Kouvola–Iisalmi line as part of their route. The station has a VR ticket machine, as well as accessible 55 centimetres (22 in) high platforms. The station building is open on all days of the week.

Mikkeli railway station has three platform tracks. Passenger trains that stop at the station mainly use track 1. In the evening, before 7 PM two passenger trains meet at the station: InterCity service IC 70 to Helsinki which stops at track 1 and Pendolino service S 69 to Kajaani which stops at track 2.
