= Mäntyharjun asemanseutu =

Mäntyharju Station Area Finnish: Mäntyharjun asemanseutu
- Village
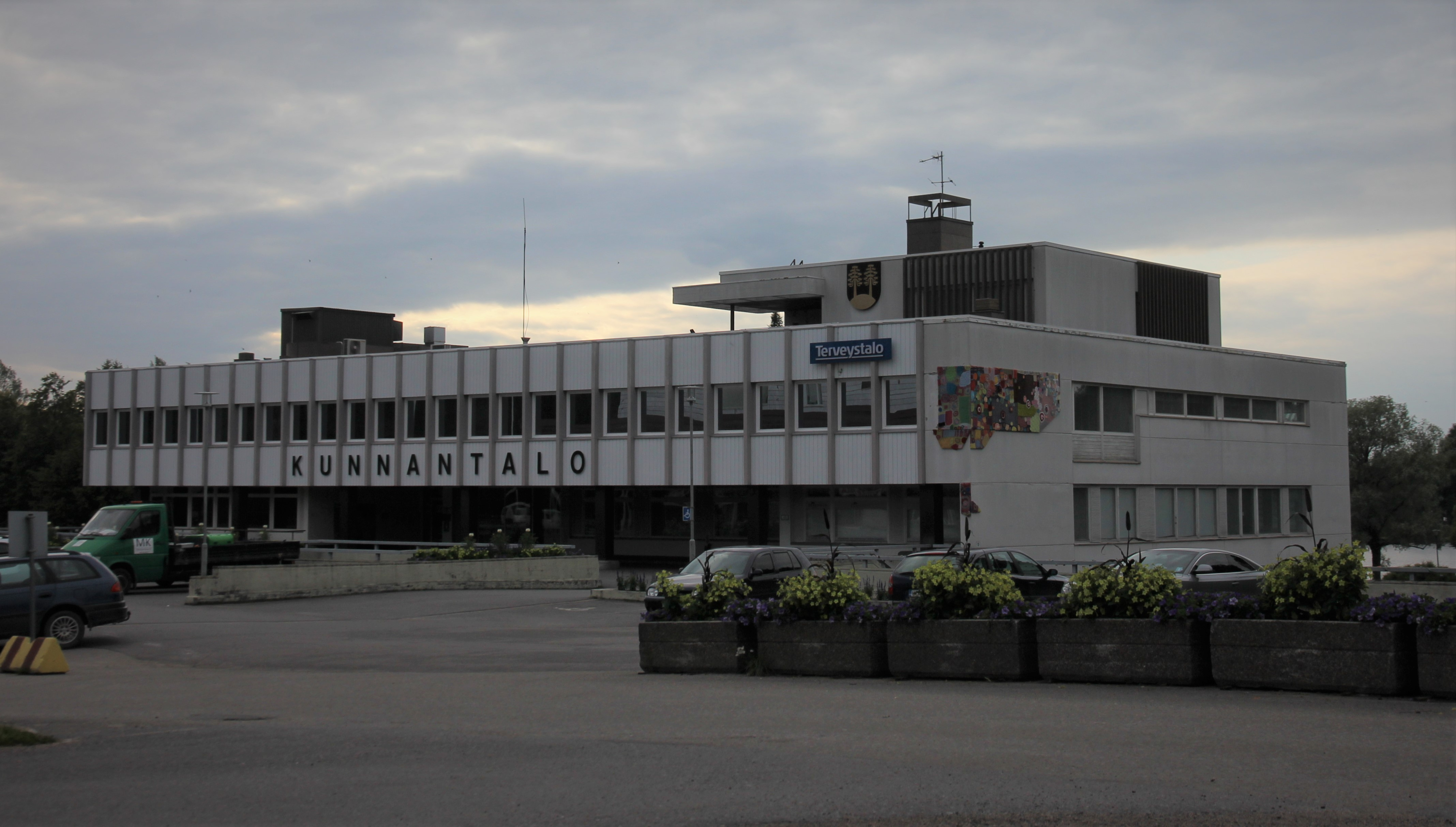
- Mäntyharju town hall

- Location in Finland
- Coordinates: 61°25′06″N 26°52′31″E
- Country: Finland
- Region: South Savo
- Municipality: Mäntyharju

Area
  - Total: 10.32 km^{2} (3.98 sq mi)

Population (31 December 2019)
  - Total: 3,629
  - Density: 351.6/km^{2} (911/sq mi)
- Time zone: UTC+2 (EET)
  - Summer (DST): UTC+3 (EEST)
- Postal code: 52700

Mäntyharjun asemanseutu (lit. Mäntyharju station area) is a village and administrative center of the Mäntyharju municipality in South Savo, Finland. At the end of 2019, the village had 3,629 inhabitants. It is located along the Savonia railway, and as its name suggests, the village has developed in the immediate vicinity of the Mäntyharju railway station. Lake Pyhävesi is located near the village.

In addition to the railway station, many of the municipality's most important services are located in the village, such as a high school and a comprehensive school, a library, a health center, a pharmacy, a sports field, a couple of grocery stores (S-market and K-Supermarket) and a few restaurants. There is also a rural hotel called Villa-Aurora in the village.
