= Maljalahti =

City district in Kuopio, Finland

Coordinates: 62°53′47″N 27°41′07″E

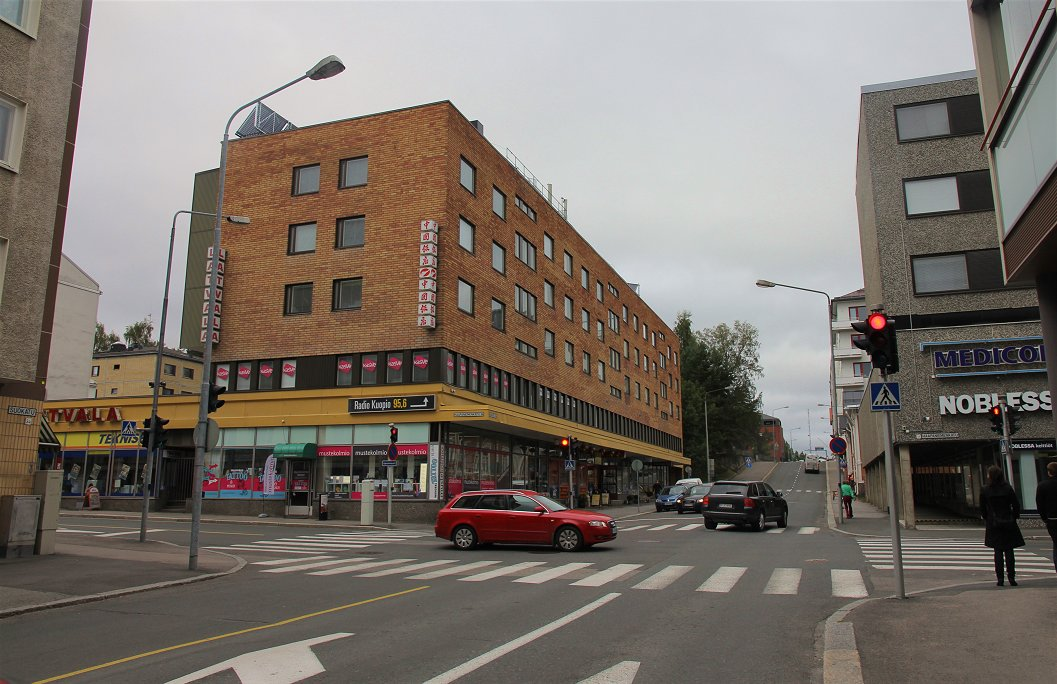
Maljalahti at the intersection of the Suokatu and Haapaniemenkatu streets

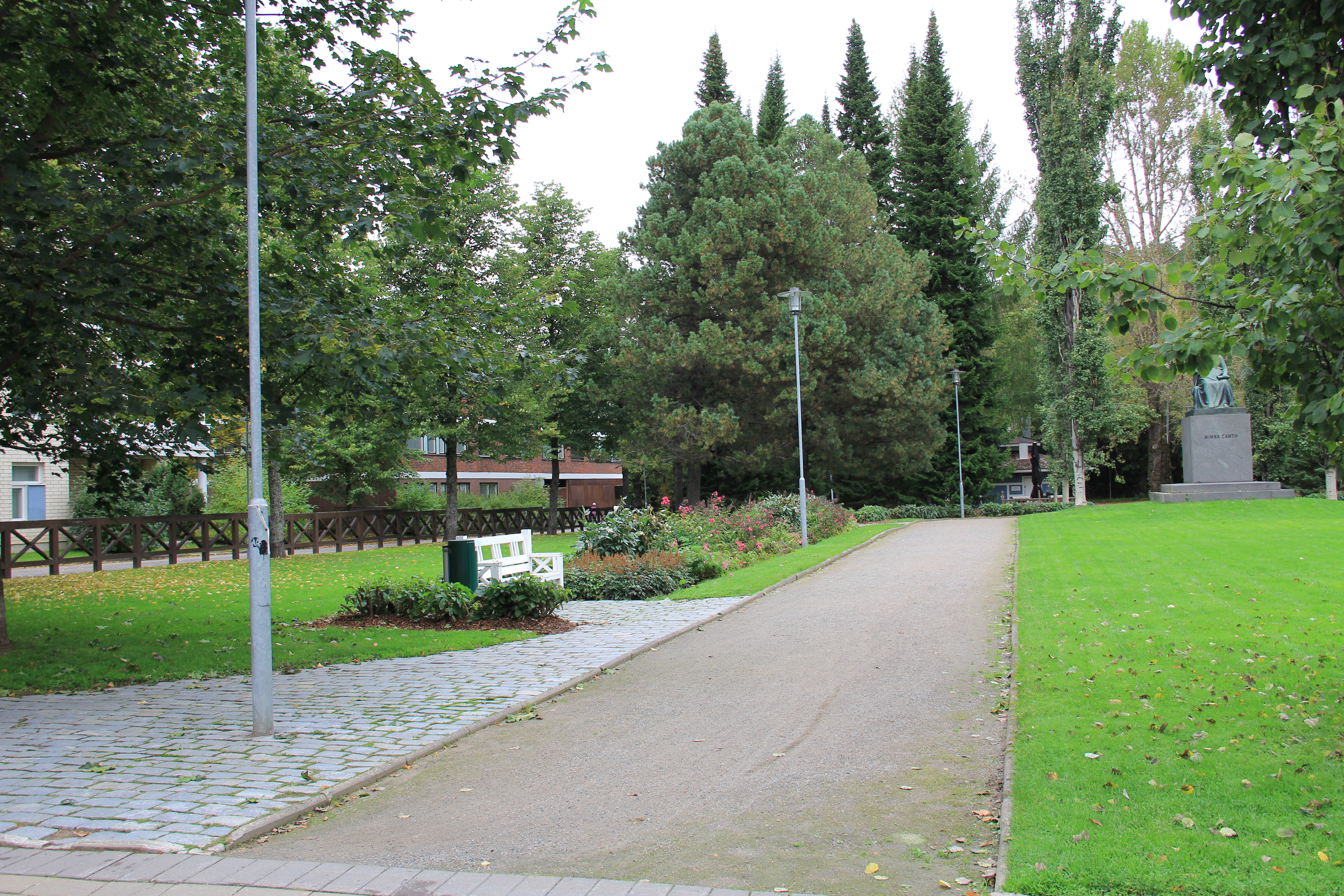
Minna Canth Park in Maljalahti

Maljalahti (Finnish pronunciation: [ˈmɑljɑˌlɑhti]; literally translated "crater bay") is a district in the central part of the city of Kuopio, Finland. The northern boundary of the district is the Savonia railway (with the exception that the Kuopio bus station north of the line belongs to the area), the Hatsalankatu street in the west, Suokatu in the south and Lake Kallavesi in the east. Neighboring parts of Maljalahti are Puijo and Linnanpelto in the north, Itkonniemi in the east, Vahtivuori and Multimäki in the south and Hatsala in the west.

The Kuopio Railway Station, the Kuopio Prison and the Hapelähteenpuisto park, among others, are located in the Maljalahti district. Before the winter, there was an ice rink in the park. There is also a park in the Maljalahti district named after the author Minna Canth.

Construction of a new residential area has begun near Maljalahti, just outside the grid area. New houses will be built next to the Savonia railway and in the area where there used to be a winter storage area for boats.
