= Antti Jaatinen =

Finnish ice hockey player

- Born: 24 September 1987 (age 37); Mäntyharju, Finland
- Height: 6 ft 1 in (185 cm)
- Weight: 201 lb (91 kg; 14 st 5 lb)
- Position: Defence
- Shoots: Left
- Liiga team Former teams: Jukurit; JYP Jyväskylä; Tappara; Lahti Pelicans; Lukko
- Playing career: 2008–present

Antti Jaatinen (born 24 September 1987) is a Finnish professional ice hockey defenceman currently playing for Jukurit of the Finnish Liiga.

During the 2011–12 season, Jaatinen played in JYP with his namesake, forward Antti-P Jaatinen.
