= Hankasalmi railway station =

Railway station in Hankasalmi, Finland

Hankasalmi
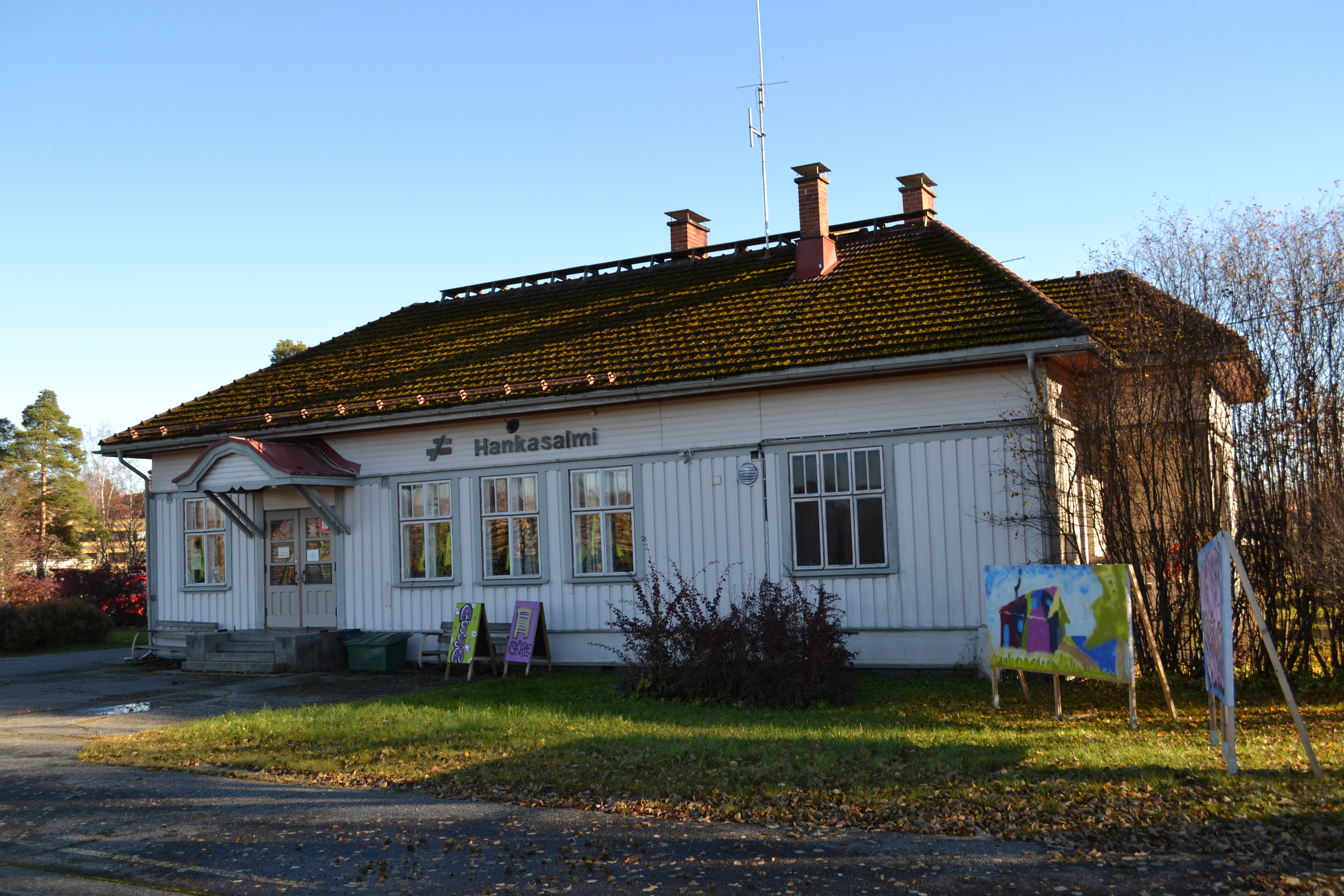

General information
- Location: Ratakatu 7, 41500; Hankasalmen asemanseutu, Hankasalmi; Finland
- Coordinates: 62°18′09.5″N 026°28′42.0″E
- System: VR station
- Owner: Finnish Transport Infrastructure Agency
- Operator: VR Group
- Line: Jyväskylä–Pieksämäki

Construction
- Architect: Thure Hellström
- Architectural style: Jugendstil

Other information
- Station code: Hks
- Classification: Operating point

History
- Opened: 1 June 1918

Services
| Preceding station | VR Group | Following station |
|---|---|---|
| Jyväskylä Terminus | Jyväskylä–Pieksämäki | Pieksämäki Terminus |
Location

The Hankasalmi railway station (Finnish: Hankasalmen rautatieasema, Swedish: Hankasalmi järnvägsstation) is located in the village and urban area of Hankasalmen asemanseutu in the municipality of Hankasalmi, Finland. It is located along the Jyväskylä–Pieksämäki railway, and its neighboring stations are Jyväskylä in the west and Pieksämäki in the east.

The Finnish Heritage Agency has proclaimed the Hankasalmi station a nationally significant built cultural environment.

== History ==
The Jyväskylä–Pieksämäki railway cuts through the municipality of Hankasalmi about 10 kilometres (6.2 mi) away from its parish village, and hence the station lies far away on the intersection between the railway and the road connecting Hankasalmi to Kangasniemi. However, the location was seen as advantageous in that lake Kuuhankavesi lies just 0.6 kilometres (0.37 mi) away from the station, greating a crossing between the railway and waterborne transport.

Work on the Jyväskylä–Pieksämäki railway began in 1913 and it was opened for traffic on 1 June 1918, making Hankasalmi one of its original stations.

== Architecture ==
The Hankasalmi station was built according to stock blueprints for class V stations on the Jyväskylä–Pieksämäki line, being designed by Thure Hellström. The mansard roof is a distinctive feature of the design that was also used for the Kallislahti station on the Huutokoski–Savonlinna railway. The station building has been well preserved, as have the other buildings on its premises, which include a warehouse as well as two residential buildings.

== Services and departure tracks ==
Hankasalmi is served by all InterCity and Pendolino trains that use the Jyväskylä–Pieksämäki line as part of their route. The station does not have a VR service point nor a ticket vending machine, and has low, inaccessible 26.5 centimetres (10.4 in) high platforms. All passenger trains that stop at the station use track 2.

A siding connects the station's rail yard to the Versowood Hankasalmi sawmill. Starting from the 2010s, the frequency of timber shipments to the sawmill by rail has decreased, though as of 2019, the connection is known to be maintained and used on an irregular basis.
