= RIISA – Orthodox Church Museum of Finland =

Museum in Kuopio, Finland

- Riisa – Suomen ortodoksinen kirkkomuseo
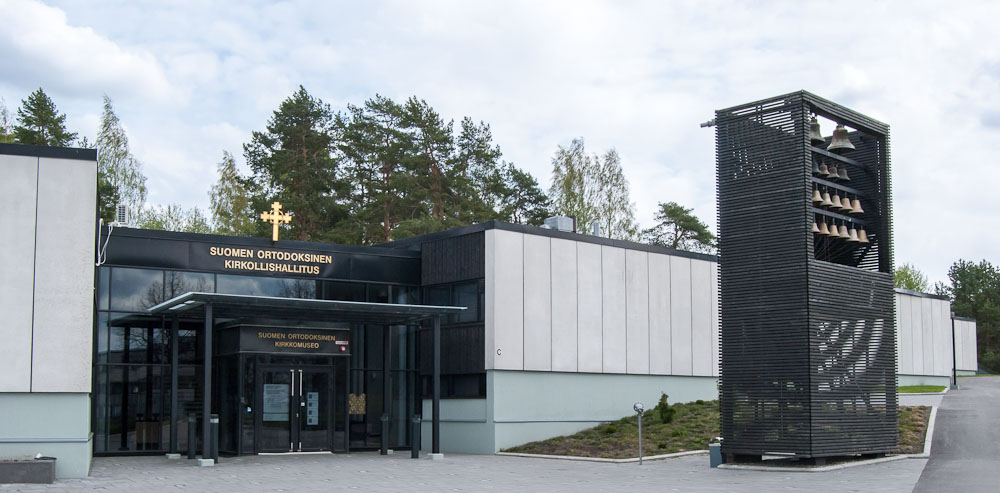
- Building 2012 (before refurbishment)
- Established: 1957
- Location: Hatsala, Kuopio, Finland
- Coordinates: 62°53′56″N 027°39′59″E
- Website: www.ortodoksinenkirkkomuseo.fi/en/

RIISA – Orthodox Church Museum of Finland (Finnish: Riisa – Suomen ortodoksinen kirkkomuseo) is a museum located in the city of Kuopio, which specializes in the research, preservation and archiving of the visual and tangible cultural heritage of the Finnish Orthodox Church.

== History ==
The museum was founded in 1957 though its origins can be dated to the Collection of Ancient Objects founded in 1911 which was located in the Valamo Monastery. The current museum was founded following the evacuation of Karelian Orthodox parishes and the monasteries of Valamo, Konevsky and Pechenga during the Second World War, after which these regions were annexed by the Soviet Union. The majority of the museum's collections are made up of artifacts that were evacuated during this period.

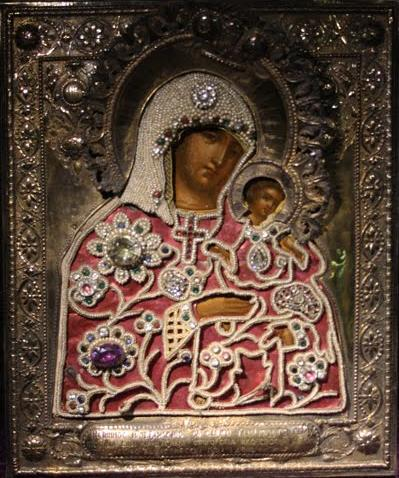
Konevsky Mother of God, 18th century.

The evacuated artifacts form one of the most significant collections of Orthodox icons, ecclesiastical items and liturgical textiles in the Western world. Most of the artifacts date from the 18th and 19th centuries, with the oldest pieces dated to the 12th century. Some of the highlights from the collection include gifts from the Russian imperial family, a wooden ladle and pectoral cross that belonged to Saint Arseny of Konevsky and a pair of Georgian-Byzantine gilded enamel miniatures from the 12th century. Another notable part of the museum's collection is made up of printed and handwritten rare books. The museum also manages a large collection of photographs, blueprints and maps.

RIISA is located in a building designed by architect Dag Englund which was constructed in 1969. Before its current location, parts of the collection were exhibited in the cellar of a clergy house in Kuopio.

The first layout of the museum in 1969 was underlining the survival after Second world war and the parishes of the areas annexed to Soviet Union. In 2015, the space was opened refurbished with new basic exhibition, covering the entire arch from Byzantium to modern-day orthodoxes in Finland.

Themes of the new displays include a chapel in Karelia, tradition of icon painting, Collection of Ancient Objects from Valamo, orthodox sacraments, calendar year of the church and resurrection.

== Works cited ==
- (2008) From Chaos to a Collection: The Orthodox Church Museum of Finland, born out of the war and the evacuation ISBN 978-951-9396-25-5
