= Varkaus railway station =

Railway station in Varkaus, Finland

Varkaus
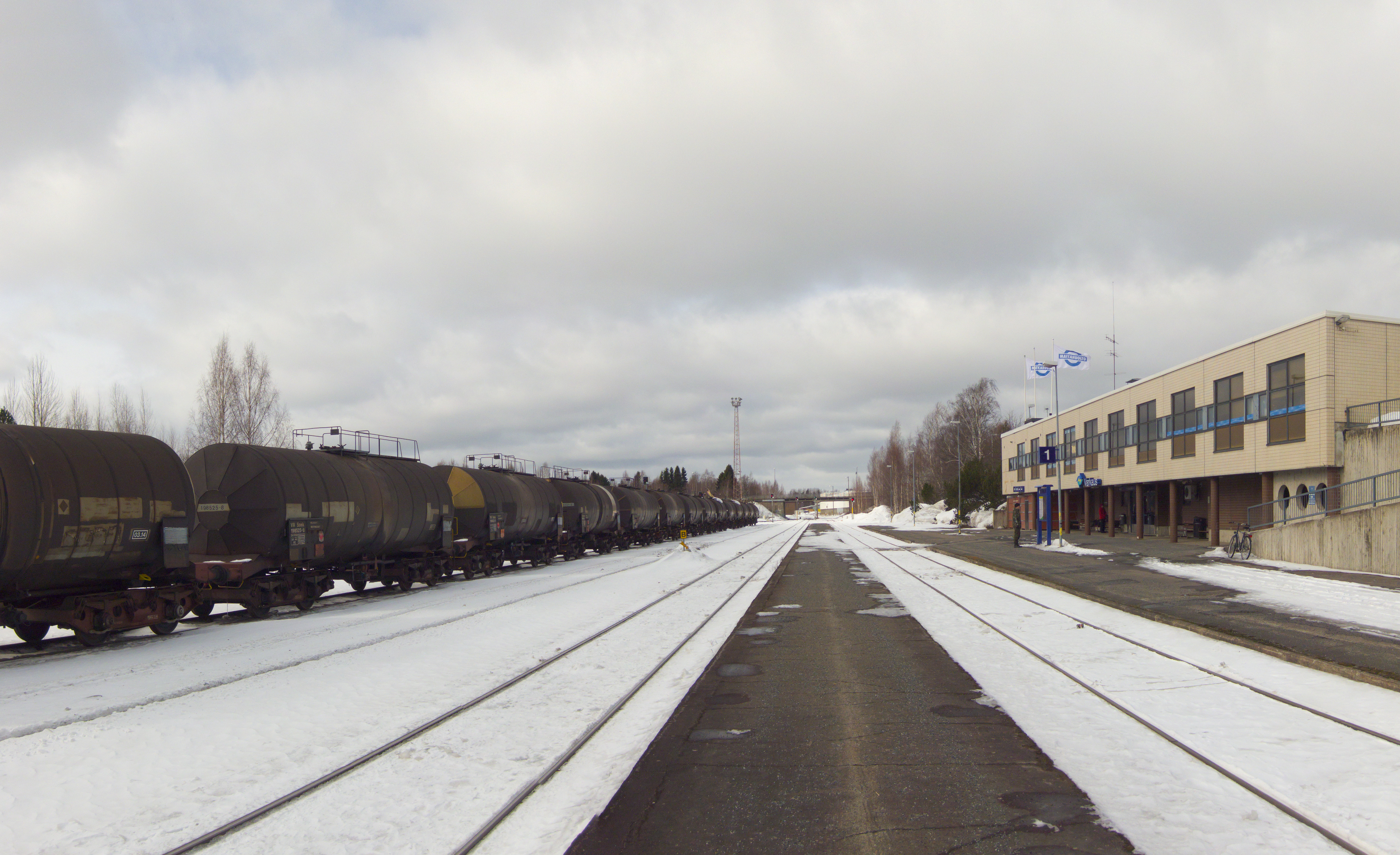
- VR class Soek tank wagons at Varkaus station.

General information
- Location: Relanderinkatu 18, 78200; Varkaus; Finland
- Coordinates: 62.312353°N 27.874353°E
- System: VR station
- Owner: Finnish Transport Infrastructure Agency
- Line: Pieksämäki–Joensuu railway
- Platforms: 2

Construction
- Structure type: ground station
- Parking: yes
- Cycle facilities: yes

Other information
- Station code: Var
- Classification: Operating point

History
- Opened: 1914
- Rebuilt: 1970s

Passengers
- 2008: 43,000

Services
Preceding station	VR Group	Following station
Pieksämäki Terminus	Pieksämäki–Joensuu	Heinävesi towards Joensuu
Location

The Varkaus railway station (abbrev. Var) is located in the town of Varkaus, Finland, in the region of North Savo. The distance from the Helsinki Central railway station is 424.7 kilometres, via the Pieksämäki and Kouvola stations. By rail, the distance to Pieksämäki is 49 kilometres (30 mi) and to Joensuu 133 kilometres (83 mi).

The track from Huutokoski to Varkaus was built in 1914. It was then extended to Vihtari in 1939 and to Viinijärvi in 1940.

In addition to the Varkaus railway yard, the station contains links to the Kommila and Akonniemi trackyards.

== Services and departure tracks ==
Varkaus is served by all railbus services that run between Pieksämäki and Joensuu and the station also has cargo traffic. The station has two platform tracks and all trains that stop at the station currently use track 2.
