= Hatsala =

City district in Kuopio, Finland

Coordinates: 62°53′38.5″N 27°40′00.0″E

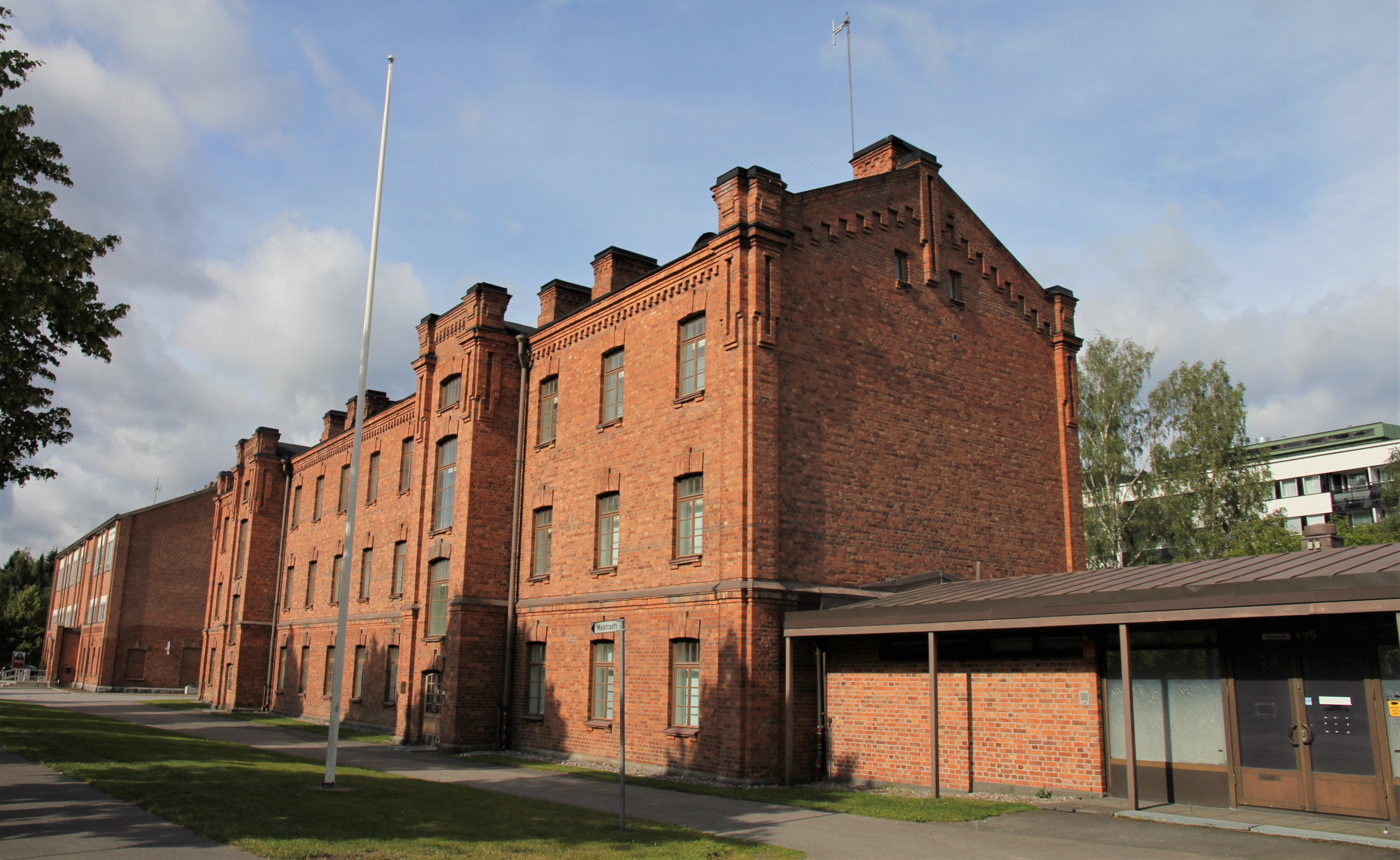
Kuopio's old barrack building

Hatsala is a district located west of the center of Kuopio, Finland. The eastern boundary of the area is Puistokatu, the southern boundary is Minna Canthin katu and the northern is the Kuopio motorway. The western border first runs along Sairaalakatu and Niiralankatu. From the intersection of Suokatu, the border first runs north, then turns west and passes through the Savonia railway line to the motorway. The border leaves Mustinlammi on the Niirala side and on the Hatsala side of the swimming hall and Kuopio Hall.

Hatsala is home to the Board Office, Kuopio Court House and Police Station, Kuopio Ice Hall (also known as Olvi Arena), Kuntolaakso Swimming Hall, the Orthodox Church Museum of Finland, Kuopio Sports Hall, the Classical High Schools of Hatsala and Kuopio, the Kuopio barracks area (nationally significant built cultural environment site) and the Kuopio Veteran Museum, the Dance Theatre Minimi and the Kuopio Community College currently operating in a larger, brick barracks building.
