= Pyhävesi =

Lake in Finland

- Location within Finland
- Coordinates: 61.42984°N 26.7741°E
- Catchment area: Kymijoki
- Basin countries: Finland
- Surface area: 15.732 km^{2} (6.074 sq mi)
- Average depth: 7.1 m (23 ft)
- Max. depth: 26.82 m (88.0 ft)
- Water volume: 0.112 km^{3} (91,000 acre⋅ft)
- Shore length^{1}: 85.23 km (52.96 mi)
- Surface elevation: 81.5 m (267 ft)
- Frozen: December–April
- Islands: Huuhtsaari
- Settlements: Mäntyharju
- ^{1} Shore length is not a well-defined measure.

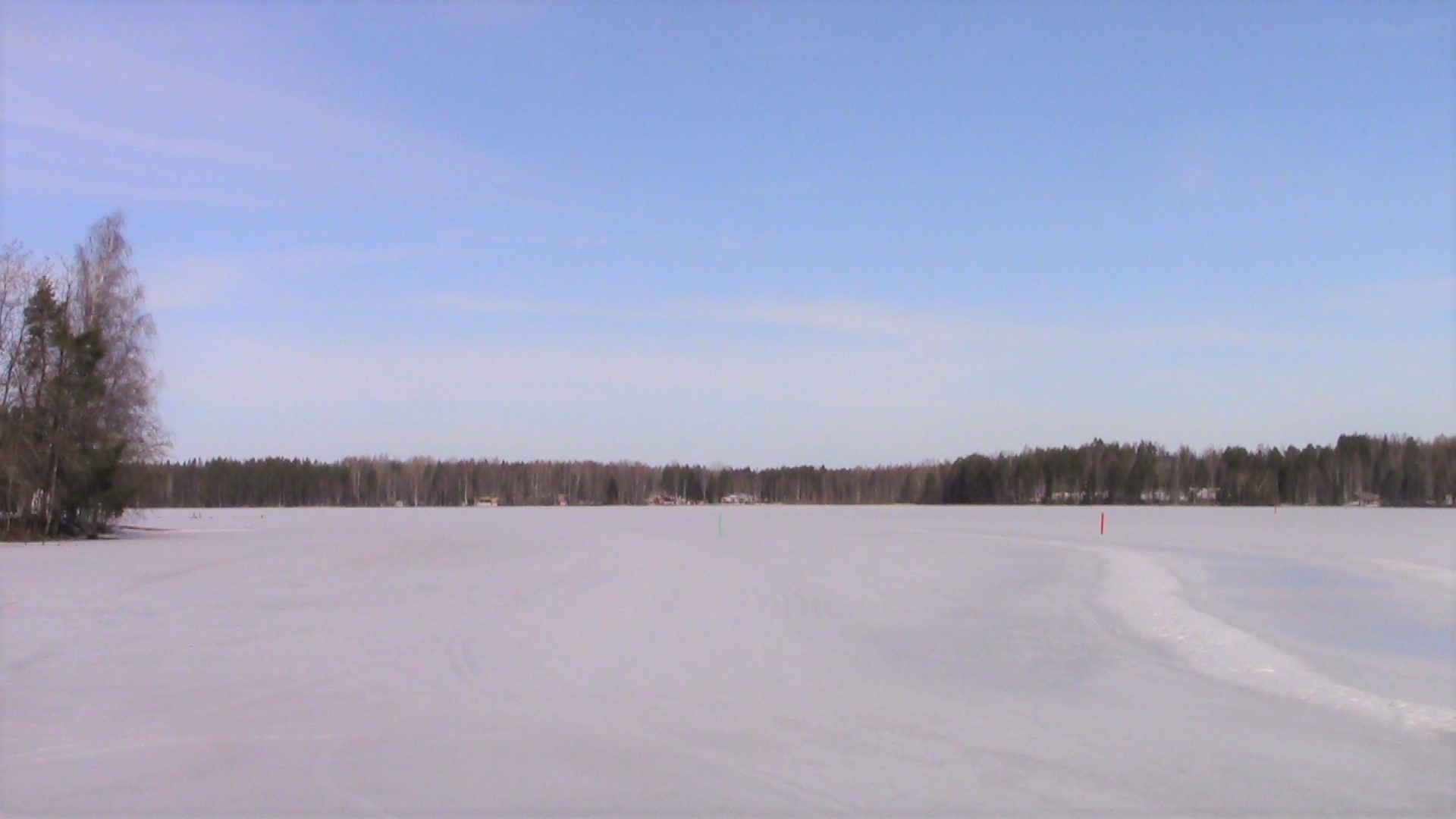
Frozen Lake Pyhävesi

Pyhävesi is a medium-sized lake located in the southeast of Finland. The nearest town is Mäntyharju to the south. It belongs to Kymijoki main catchment area and to region Kymenlaakso.

== See also ==
- List of lakes in Finland
