= Ylivieska railway station =

Railway station in Ylivieska, Finland

Ylivieska
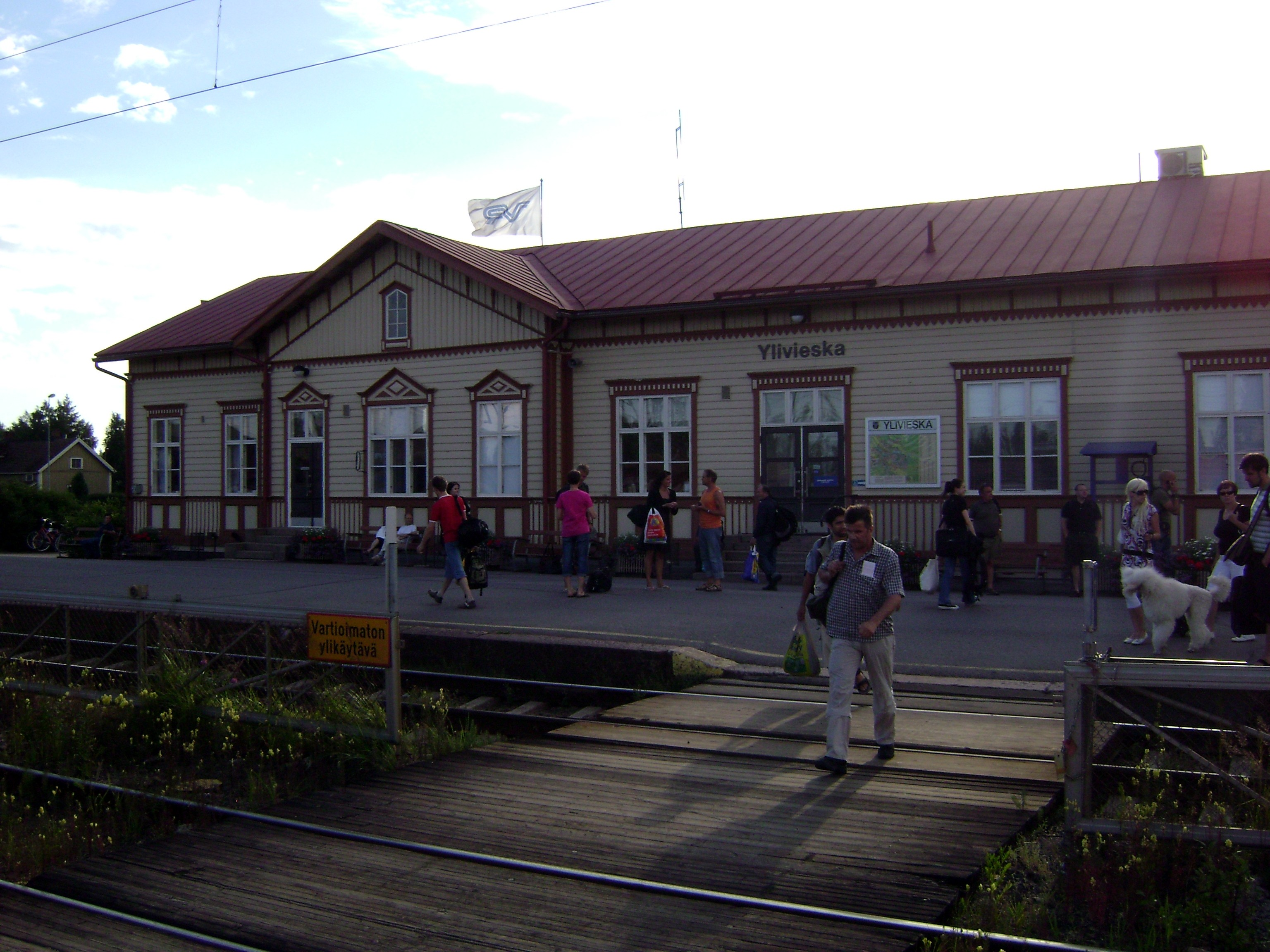

General information
- Location: Asemakatu 11, 84100 Ylivieska
- Coordinates: 64°04′19″N 024°32′24″E
- System: VR station
- Owner: Finnish Transport Agency
- Platforms: 3

Construction
- Structure type: ground station

History
- Opened: 1886

Passengers
- 200,000
Location

Ylivieska railway station is located in the town of Ylivieska in Northern Ostrobothnia, Finland. The station building was completed in 1886. The station is served by all of the passenger trains that run between Helsinki and Oulu as well as by the Ylivieska–Iisalmi regional trains.

== Departure tracks ==
- Track 1 is used by the majority of the passenger trains both towards Helsinki and Oulu.
- Track 2 is used by a few trains bound to Oulu.
- Track 3 is the departure track of the regional trains to Iisalmi.
