= Kuopio Ice Hall =

Ice hockey arena in Kuopio, Finland

Kuopion Jäähalli
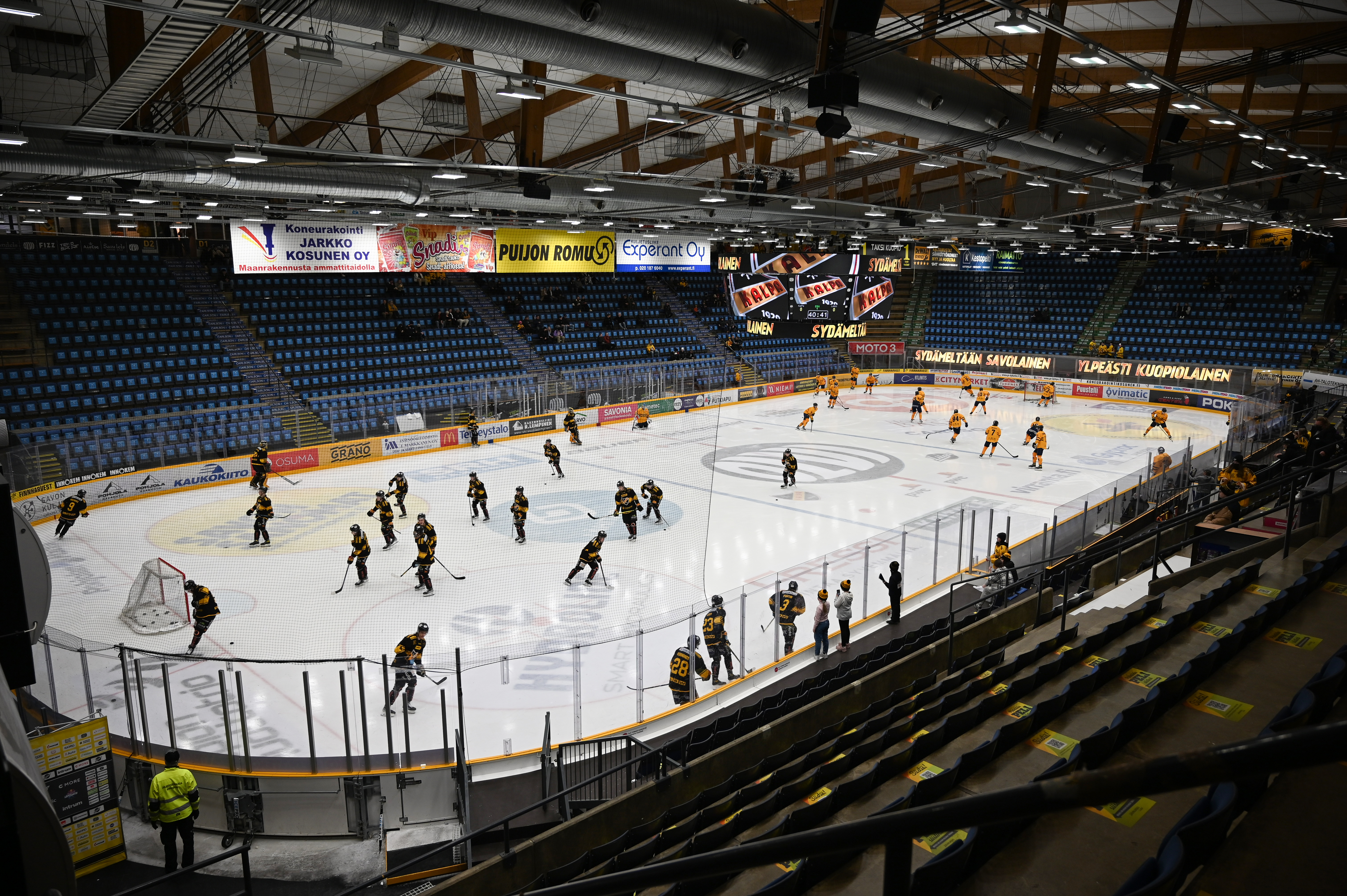
- Interactive map of Kuopion Jäähalli
- Address: Hannes Kolehmaisen katu 4; 70110 Kuopio; Finland
- Coordinates: 62°53′43″N 27°39′58″E
- Operator: KalPa; KalPa Naiset
- Capacity: 5300

Construction
- Opened: 1979

Kuopio Ice Hall (Finnish: Kuopion jäähalli, unofficially Niiralan Monttu) or Olvi Arena, is the ice hockey arena located in the Hatsala district of Kuopio, Finland which is also the home arena of Liiga team KalPa. The arena is built in 1979.

The ice hall can hold a maximum number of 5,300 spectators in the stands.

== See also ==
- List of indoor arenas in Finland
- List of indoor arenas in Nordic countries
