= Hankasalmi =

- Municipality
- Hankasalmen kunta Hankasalmi kommun
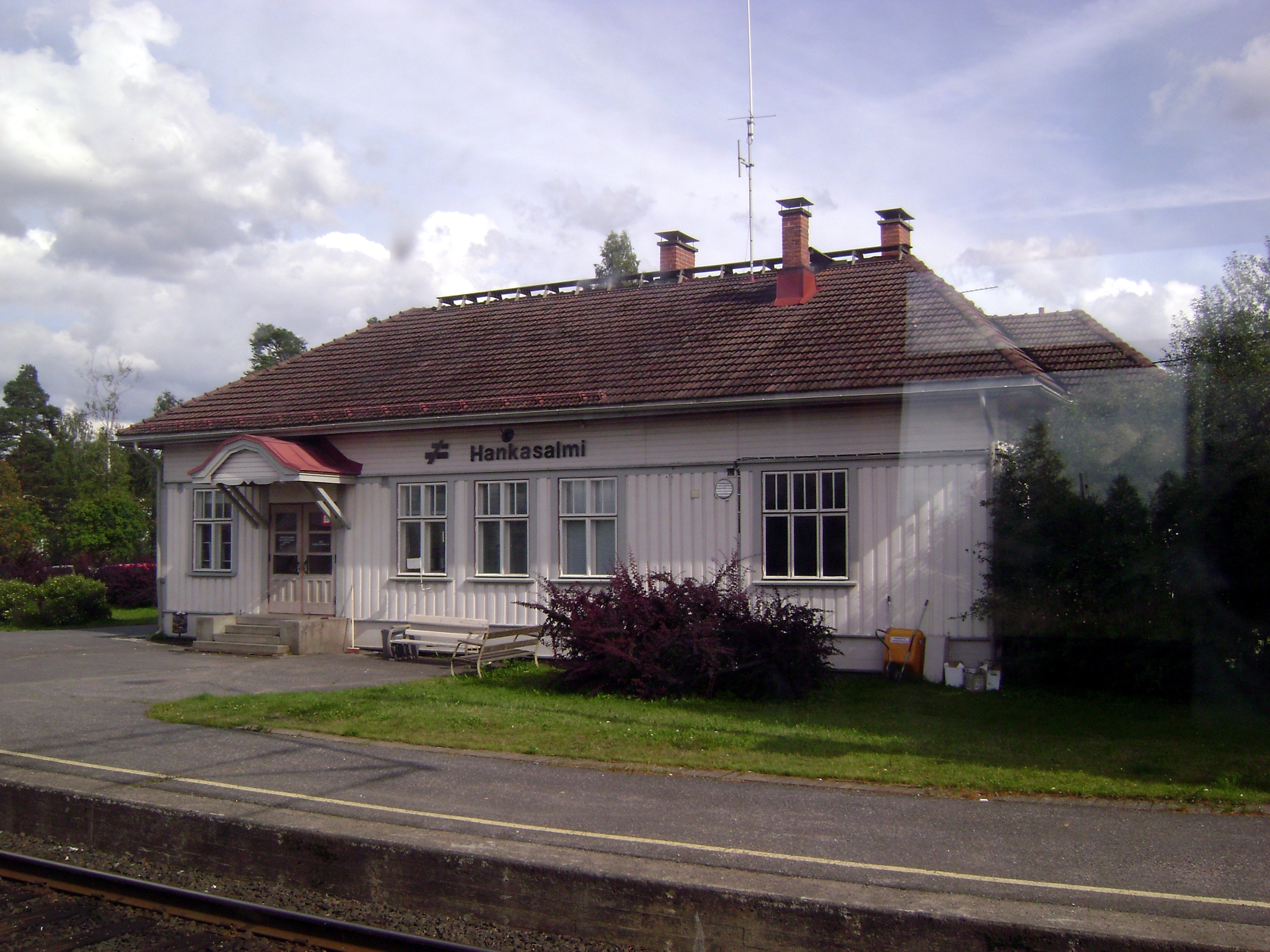
- Hankasalmi railway station

- Coat of arms

- Location of Hankasalmi in Finland
- Interactive map of Hankasalmi
- Coordinates: 62°23′N 026°26′E
- Country: Finland
- Region: Central Finland
- Sub-region: Jyväskylä
- Charter: 1872

Government
  - Municipal manager: Matti Mäkinen

Area (2018-01-01)
  - Total: 687.75 km^{2} (265.54 sq mi)
  - Land: 571.7 km^{2} (220.7 sq mi)
  - Water: 115.89 km^{2} (44.75 sq mi)
  - Rank: 149th largest in Finland

Population (2025-12-31)
  - Total: 4,436
  - Rank: 181st largest in Finland
  - Density: 7.76/km^{2} (20.1/sq mi)

Population by native language
  - Finnish: 97.1% (official)
  - Swedish: 0.2%
  - Others: 2.6%

Population by age
  - 0 to 14: 14.5%
  - 15 to 64: 53.4%
  - 65 or older: 32.1%
- Time zone: UTC+02:00 (EET)
  - Summer (DST): UTC+03:00 (EEST)
- Website: hankasalmi.fi

Hankasalmi is a municipality of Finland, located in the Central Finland region. The municipality has a population of 4,436 (31 December 2025) and covers an area of 687.75 square kilometres (265.54 sq mi) of which 115.89 km^{2} (44.75 sq mi) is water. The population density is 7.76 inhabitants per square kilometre (20.1/sq mi).

The municipality is unilingually Finnish.

Hankasalmi is a rural municipality in the Jyväskylä region. It provides housing, employment, and leisure opportunities for residents and visitors. The municipality has public services and is connected by highway and rail. Hankasalmi has several elementary schools, a high school, and a high school where you can take part in high-level navigation training.

== Geography ==
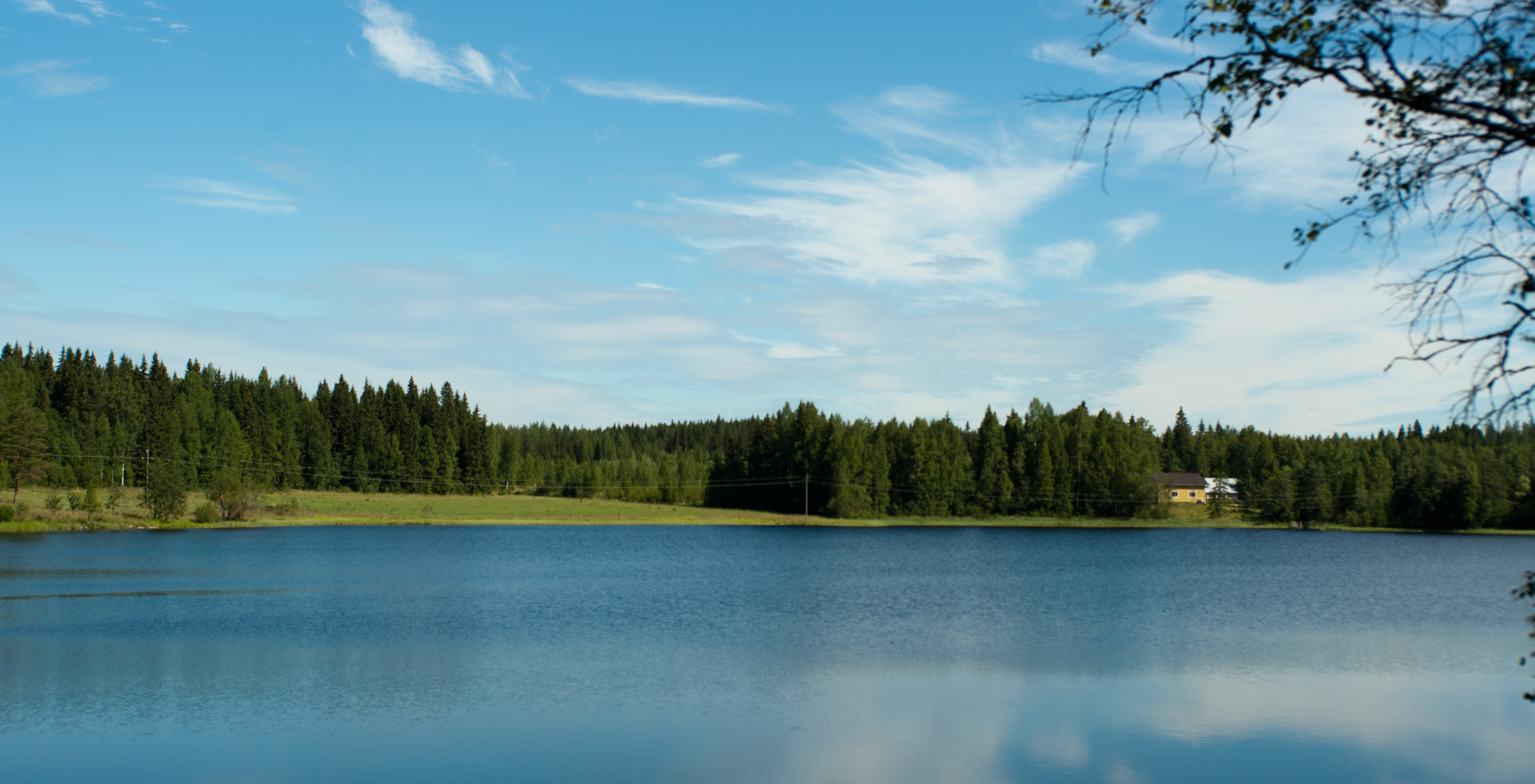
Lake Säkinlampi

Neighbouring municipalities are Kangasniemi, Konnevesi, Laukaa, Pieksämäki, Rautalampi and Toivakka.

There are all together 97 lakes in Hankasalmi. The biggest lakes are Kynsivesi-Leivonvesi, Armisvesi and Kuuhankavesi.

=== Villages ===
- Halttula
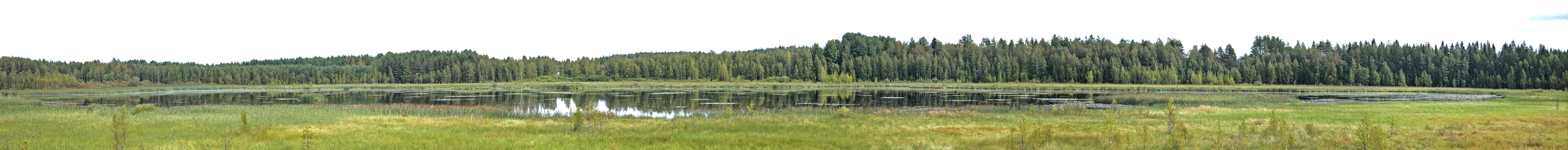
A view from a birdwatching tower towards pond Keskinen in Hankasalmi.

== History ==
The name Hankasalmi was first mentioned in 1552 when it was a wilderness owned by the Tavastians of Hauho. The settlement has existed at least since 1559. In 1561, it was transferred to the new Rautalampi parish, which was largely settled by Savonians.

Hankasalmi became an independent parish in 1802, but administratively it remained a part of Rautalampi until 1872, when the modern Hankasalmi municipality was formed. Parts of it were also taken from Pieksämäki, Kangasniemi and Laukaa.

== Notable individuals ==
- Antero Halonen, boxer
- Matti A. Karjalainen, professor at the Helsinki University of Technology
- Niina Mäkinen, ice hockey player
- Onni Pellinen, Olympic wrestler
- Vilho Ylönen, cross-country skier and rifle shooter

== Twin towns and sister cities ==
Hankasalmi is twinned with:

- Häädemeeste, Estonia
- Karmøy, Norway
- Mjölby, Sweden
