= Savo Railway Museum =

- Savon Radan Museo
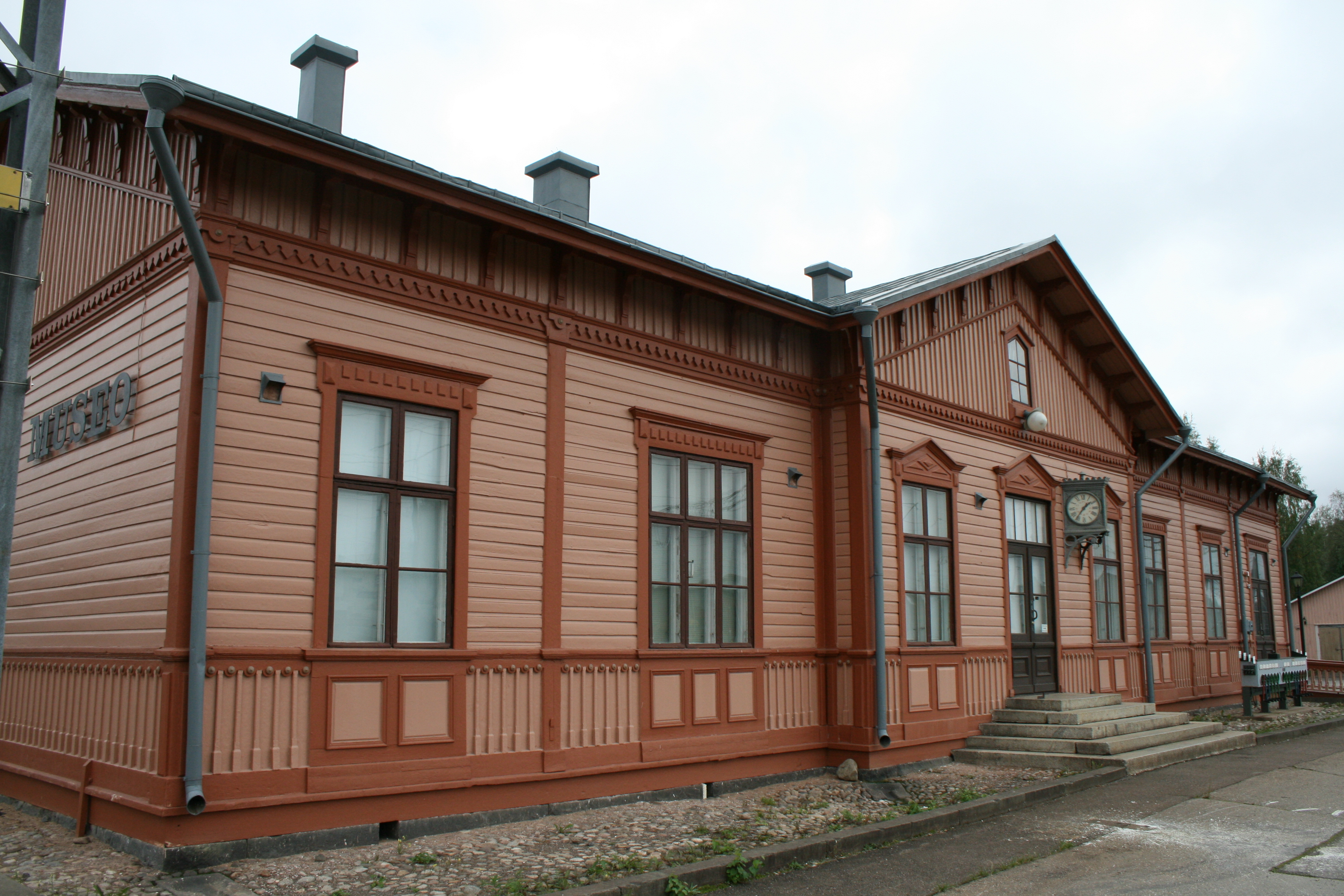
- Established: 1989
- Location: Pieksämäki, Finland
- Coordinates: 62°18′04″N 027°10′05″E
- Type: railway museum
- Website: www.savonradanmuseo.fi

Savo Railway Museum (Finnish: Savon Radan Museo) is a museum located in Pieksämäki, Finland. It presents the history of rail transport, with a focus on Savo Railway and the Pieksämäki region. It is located in a former station building from 1889, and the museum opened to the public in 1989.
