= Rautatie =

1884 novel by Juhani Aho

Rautatie (Finnish for "railroad") is the first novel by the Finnish writer Juhani Aho, published in 1884. Its style has been called national miniature realism. The novel is about the quiet life of a couple living in the middle of the woods and their attempts at imagining what a railroad is based on what they have heard. Rautatie is one of the classics of Finnish literature, and has had more than twenty editions by the start of the 21st century. It has been called Aho's first "artistic full hit". In 2007, WSOY published a perfect copy of the 1892 colour edition illustrated by Eero Järnefelt. A TV film by the same name was made based on the novel in 1973. The novel has also been adapted to numerous plays.

The central elements in Rautatie are the imaginations of small-time agrarians and the differences between poor, far-away places and richer places, and the social gap between the "lords" and the "common people". One important element is over-use of alcoholic beverages, which is a common theme in Finnish literature as the start of decadent events.

== Background ==
Rautatie was written in spring and summer 1884 and published in December in the same year. Aho had become familiar with the "common people" in his home village of Vieremä in Iisalmi from 1876. Starting from his matriculation in 1880 he had frequently travelled by train between his home and Helsinki. People living in far-away places attached fantasy to the railroad in their minds. The railroad was a subject of political controversy during the diets in the 1880s, which Aho closely followed as a journalist.

Aho's closest friends included the Järnefelt family, whose critic significantly influenced the artistic form of Rautatie. Especially Kasper Järnefelt was involved in fixing the miniature novel page by page. Minna Canth praised Rautatie as a masterpiece already when it was first published. She got to read the script in August 1884.

== Notes ==
There have been hundreds of thousands of copies of Rautatie printed in its original Finnish. An English translation by Owen Witesman was published in 2013 as The Railroad. It has also been translated to Swedish (Järnvägen), Estonian (Raudtee), German (Die Eisenbahn) and to four other languages. The Finnish edition has also been published as Rautatie eli Kertomus ukosta ja akasta, jotka eivät olleet sitä ennen nähneet ("The railroad, that is a tale of a man and a woman, who had not seen it ever before"). Rautatie has also been published as a free audiobook.

The Kuopio-Iisalmi part of the Savonia railroad was opened in 1902, and the Lapinlahti railway station was also opened at the time. When Aho was writing his first novel, the railroad part was still being planned.

== Sources ==
- Laitinen, Kai: Suomen kirjallisuuden historia, Otava, ISBN 951-1-06187-9
- Kodin suuret klassikot, Juhani Aho part I, Weilin+Göös, 1989, ISBN 951-35-4816-3
- Archive.org/rautatie
- Yle.fi
