= Repovesi National Park =

National park in Finland

- IUCN category II (national park)
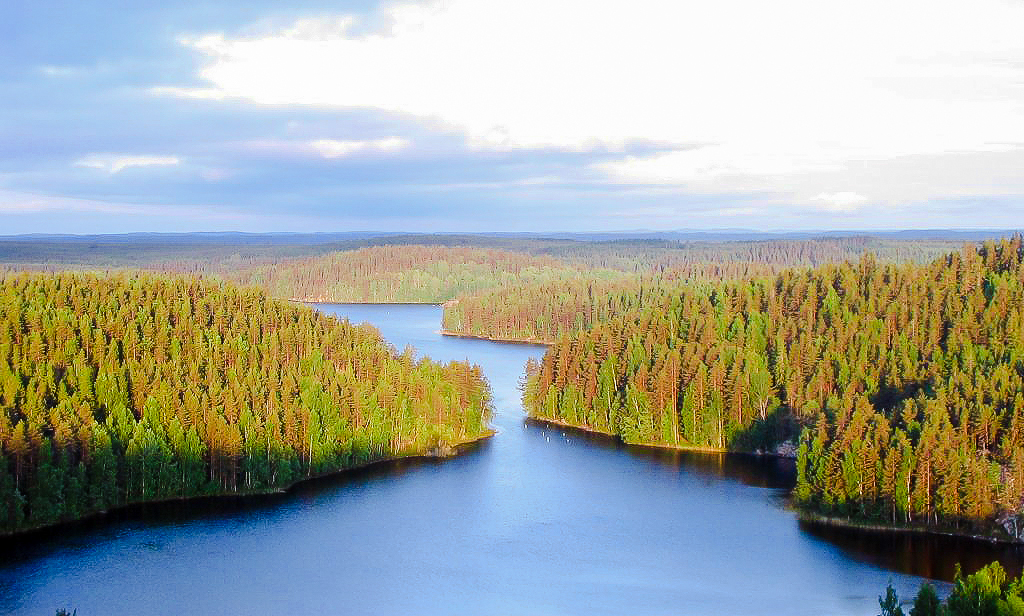
- A summer night at Repovesi

- Location within Finland
- Location: Finland
- Coordinates: 61°11′N 026°53′E
- Area: 15 km^{2} (5.8 sq mi)
- Established: 2003
- Visitors: 100,900 (in 2024)
- Governing body: Metsähallitus
- Website: www.outdoors.fi/repovesinp

Repovesi National Park (Finnish: Repoveden kansallispuisto) is situated in the municipalities of Kouvola and Mäntyharju, only a few hours north-east of the more populous Helsinki area of southern Finland. Formerly a site for intensive commercial forestry, the Repovesi area successfully transformed into a pristine national park. Pine and birch trees dominate the park. Repovesi abounds with wildlife including bear, deer and various birds. The River Koukunjoki flows through the park. Other streams and lakes are also situated within the parks boundaries.

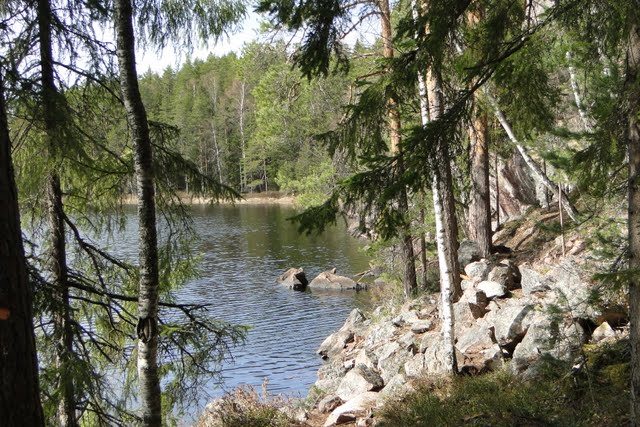
Repovesi National Park

Attractions include the Olhavanvuori hill, popular among climbers, and the Kultareitti water taxi route. Also located in the park are the Kuutinlahti bay with its restored timber rafting channels, the Lapinsalmi suspension bridge, and many observation towers.

The common fauna of the park includes the red-throated diver, the northern lynx, the moose, Black woodpecker, many owls and several galliformes.

== Lapinsalmi suspension bridge ==
Lapinsalmi bridge

A key attraction and access point to the trails in the park is the Lapinsalmi suspension bridge, which remains closed as of June 2025 due to ongoing safety and structural concerns. Originally rebuilt in 2019 after a collapse of the earlier bridge, it quickly became a popular and iconic entrance point to the park. Since early 2024, however, the bridge has been closed pending repairs that include the installation of wind bracing cables and reinforcement of its structure following updated safety reviews. Alternative access across the Lapinsalmi strait is provided via the Ketunlossi hand-operated ferry, which accommodates up to eight people at a time during the summer months, though visitors may experience congestion during busy periods.

== See also ==
- List of national parks of Finland
- Protected areas of Finland
