= Haapakoski =

Haapakoski is a Finnish surname. Notable people with the surname include:

- Aarne Haapakoski (1904–1961), Finnish pulp writer
- Antti Haapakoski (born 1971), Finnish hurdler
- Mikko Haapakoski (born 1967), Finnish ice hockey defender
- Niko Haapakoski (born 1996), Finnish volleyball player
- Paula Haapakoski (born 1977), Finnish orienteering competitor
- Tapani Haapakoski (born 1953), Finnish Olympic pole vaulter
