= Pieksänjärvi =

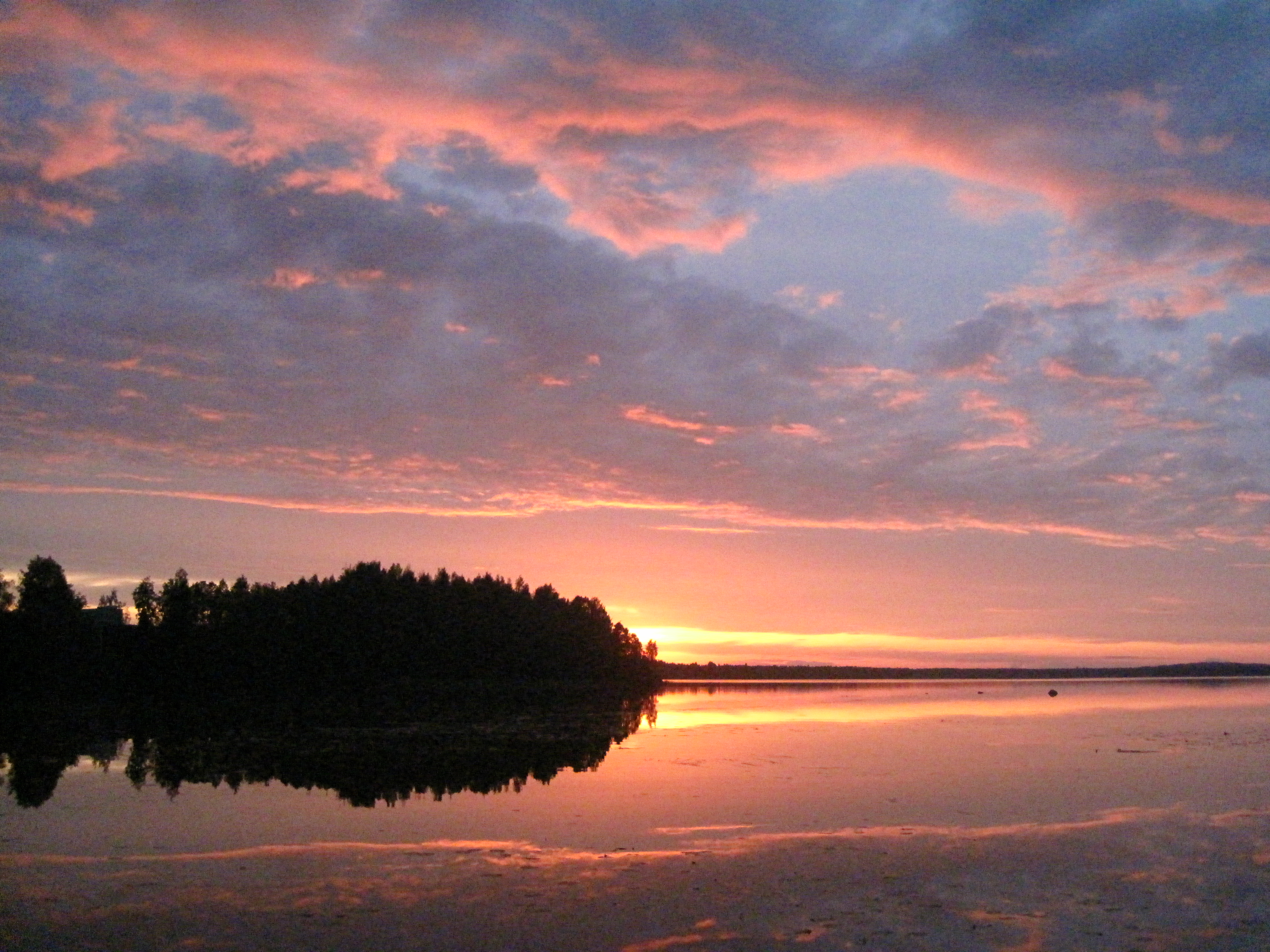

- Location within Finland
- Location: Pieksämäki
- Coordinates: 62°21′N 027°09′E
- Type: Lake
- Primary inflows: Haapajoki
- Catchment area: Kymijoki
- Basin countries: Finland
- Surface area: 20.984 km^{2} (8.102 sq mi)
- Average depth: 2.07 m (6 ft 9 in)
- Max. depth: 14 m (46 ft)
- Water volume: 0.0434 km^{3} (35,200 acre⋅ft)
- Shore length^{1}: 64.43 km (40.03 mi)
- Surface elevation: 118.9 m (390 ft)
- Frozen: December–April
- Islands: Salonsaari, Lastensaari, Tuomarsaari, Pajuluoto, Kirkkosaari
- Settlements: Pieksämäki
- ^{1} Shore length is not a well-defined measure.

Pieksänjärvi is a medium-sized lake in Pieksämäki, Southern Savonia region in eastern Finland. It is situated in the Kymijoki main catchment area. It is located in the town of Pieksämäki.

== See also ==
- List of lakes in Finland
