= Antti-P Jaatinen =

Finnish ice hockey player

- Born: 24 July 1986 (age 39) Mikkeli, Finland
- Height: 6 ft 2 in (188 cm)
- Weight: 194 lb (88 kg; 13 st 12 lb)
- Position: Left wing
- Shot: Left
- Played for: JYP Jyväskylä; Lahti Pelicans; Ilves Tampere; Ässät Pori; Boxers de Bordeaux
- Playing career: 2005–2018

Antti-P Jaatinen (born 24 July 1986) is a Finnish former professional ice hockey forward who played in the Finnish Liiga.

== Playing career ==
Jaatinen made his SM-liiga debut playing with JYP Jyväskylä during the 2011–12 SM-liiga season.

Jaatinen concluded his 13-year professional career, after playing one season abroad with Boxers de Bordeaux of the French Ligue Magnus in the 2017–18 season.

== Career statistics ==
			Regular season					Playoffs
Season	Team	League	GP	G	A	Pts	PIM	GP	G	A	Pts	PIM
2001–02	Tappara U16	U16 SM-sarja	13	4	6	10	20	2	1	0	1	2
2002–03	Tappara U18	U18 SM-sarja	28	6	8	14	12	—	—	—	—	—
2003–04	Tappara U18	U18 SM-sarja	10	5	9	14	12	—	—	—	—	—
2003–04	Tappara U20	U20 SM-liiga	32	9	5	14	30	12	2	4	6	8
2004–05	Tappara U20	U20 SM-liiga	37	11	11	22	22	4	0	0	0	4
2005–06	Jokipojat U20	U20 I-divisioona Q	1	0	0	0	22	—	—	—	—	—
2005–06	Jokipojat	Mestis	41	9	3	12	48	4	0	0	0	0
2005–06	Suomi U20	Mestis	4	1	0	1	0	—	—	—	—	—
2006–07	Hokki	Mestis	38	19	11	30	30	12	1	3	4	8
2007–08	Vaasan Sport	Mestis	43	13	19	32	34	5	3	1	4	16
2008–09	Vaasan Sport	Mestis	44	9	14	23	60	10	0	0	0	12
2009–10	Hokki	Mestis	27	15	15	30	22	—	—	—	—	—
2010–11	Vaasan Sport	Mestis	13	8	2	10	8	12	4	5	9	0
2011–12	JYP Jyväskylä	SM-liiga	30	6	1	7	12	5	0	2	2	2
2011–12	JYP-Akatemia	Mestis	6	4	3	7	6	—	—	—	—	—
2012–13	JYP Jyväskylä	SM-liiga	53	13	12	25	30	11	2	1	3	6
2013–14	JYP Jyväskylä	Liiga	15	2	2	4	4	—	—	—	—	—
2013–14	JYP-Akatemia	Mestis	6	3	3	6	2	—	—	—	—	—
2014–15	JYP Jyväskylä	Liiga	15	2	2	4	2	—	—	—	—	—
2014–15	JYP-Akatemia	Mestis	7	1	2	3	6	—	—	—	—	—
2014–15	Lahti Pelicans	Liiga	19	7	3	10	2	—	—	—	—	—
2015–16	Lahti Pelicans	Liiga	8	0	0	0	4	—	—	—	—	—
2015–16	Peliitat Heinola	Mestis	1	0	0	0	0	—	—	—	—	—
2015–16	Ilves	Liiga	12	1	1	2	6	—	—	—	—	—
2016–17	Porin Ässät	Liiga	39	1	1	2	8	3	0	0	0	2
2017–18	Boxers de Bordeaux	Ligue Magnus	38	11	16	27	16	9	2	2	4	8
Liiga totals			191	32	22	54	68	19	2	3	5	10
Mestis totals			230	82	72	154	216	50	8	11	19	38
