= Kuuhankavesi =

Lake in Hankasalmi, Finland

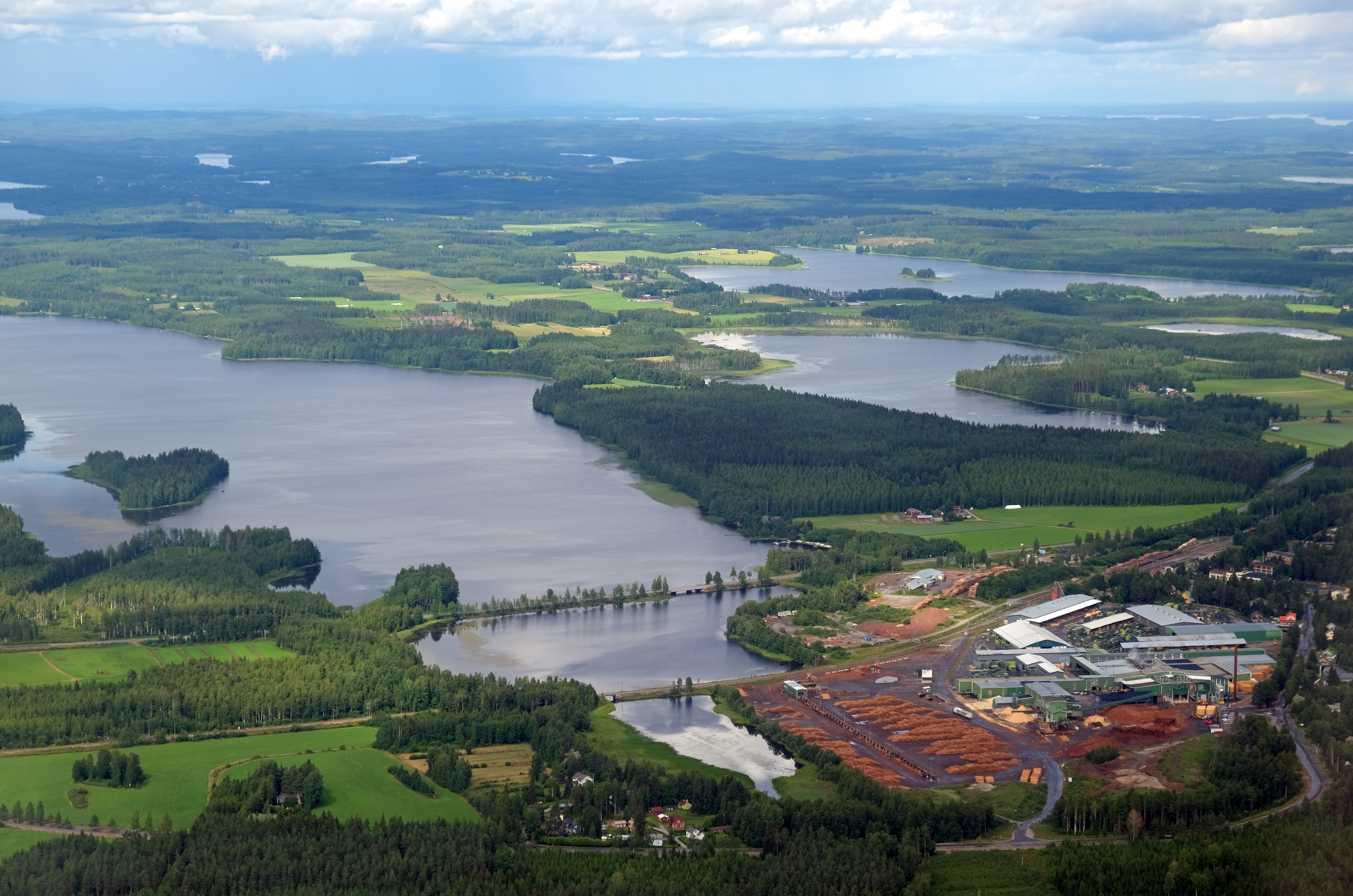

- Location within Finland
- Location: Hankasalmi
- Coordinates: 62°22′N 026°25′E
- Primary outflows: Venejoki
- Catchment area: Kymijoki
- Basin countries: Finland
- Surface area: 18.372 km^{2} (7.093 sq mi)
- Average depth: 5.36 m (17.6 ft)
- Max. depth: 24 m (79 ft)
- Water volume: 0.0984 km^{3} (79,800 acre⋅ft)
- Shore length^{1}: 49.84 km (30.97 mi)
- Surface elevation: 98.8 m (324 ft)
- Frozen: December–April
- Settlements: Hankasalmi
- References: Citizen's MapSite
- ^{1} Shore length is not a well-defined measure.

Kuuhankavesi is a medium-sized lake of Finland. It is located in Hankasalmi, Central Finland region. It belongs to the Kymijoki main catchment area.

== See also ==
- List of lakes in Finland
