= Iisalmi railway station =

Railway station in Iisalmi, Finland

Coordinates: 63°33′37″N 027°12′01″E

Iisalmi Idensalmi
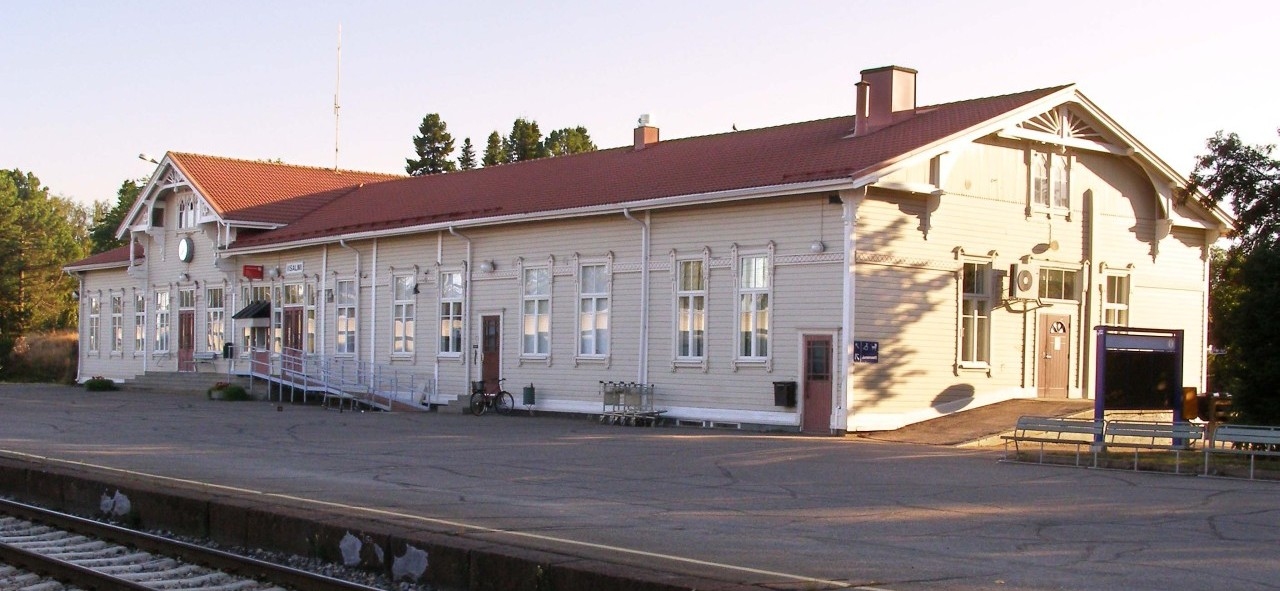

General information
- Location: Savonkatu 32, 74100 Iisalmi
- System: VR station
- Owner: Finnish Transport Agency
- Platforms: 3

Construction
- Structure type: Ground station
- Architect: Bruno Granholm

History
- Opened: 1902
Location

Iisalmi railway station (Finnish: Iisalmen rautatieasema, Swedish: Idensalmi järnvägsstation) is located in Iisalmi, Finland. The station is operated by VR.

The Finnish Heritage Agency has classified Iisalmi railway station as a nationally significant built cultural environment.

== History ==
Iisalmi railway station was opened on July 1, 1902 as the expansion of the Savonia railway from Kuopio to Iisalmi was opened. The wooden station building designed by architect Bruno Granholm was completed in 1902. The building was first expanded in 1904, as the rail connection to Kajaani was opened, and later in 1925 and 1930.

The rail connection from Iisalmi further north up to Kajaani was opened in 1904. A railway track from the railway station to the local harbour was opened in 1907. Iisalmi became a junction station in 1925 as the Iisalmi–Ylivieska railway line was opened.

In December 2006 the electrification of the railway between Iisalmi and Oulu was completed.

== Services ==
Iisalmi is served by all long-distance services that travel via the Savonia railway from Helsinki to Kajaani and Oulu as well as by regional train services to Ylivieska.

== Departure tracks ==
Iisalmi railway station has three platform tracks. Track 1 is currently unused by the passenger trains that stop at the station.

- Track 2 is the departure track of the regional trains to Ylivieska.
- Track 3 is used by the long-distance trains that travel via the Savonia railway into both directions (southwards to Kouvola and northwards to Kajaani).

Preceding station	VR Group	Following station
Lapinlahti towards Kouvola	Kouvola–Oulu	Sukeva direct towards Oulu
Terminus	Iisalmi–Ylivieska	Runni direct towards Ylivieska
