= Mäntyharju =

- Municipality
- Mäntyharjun kunta Mäntyharju kommun
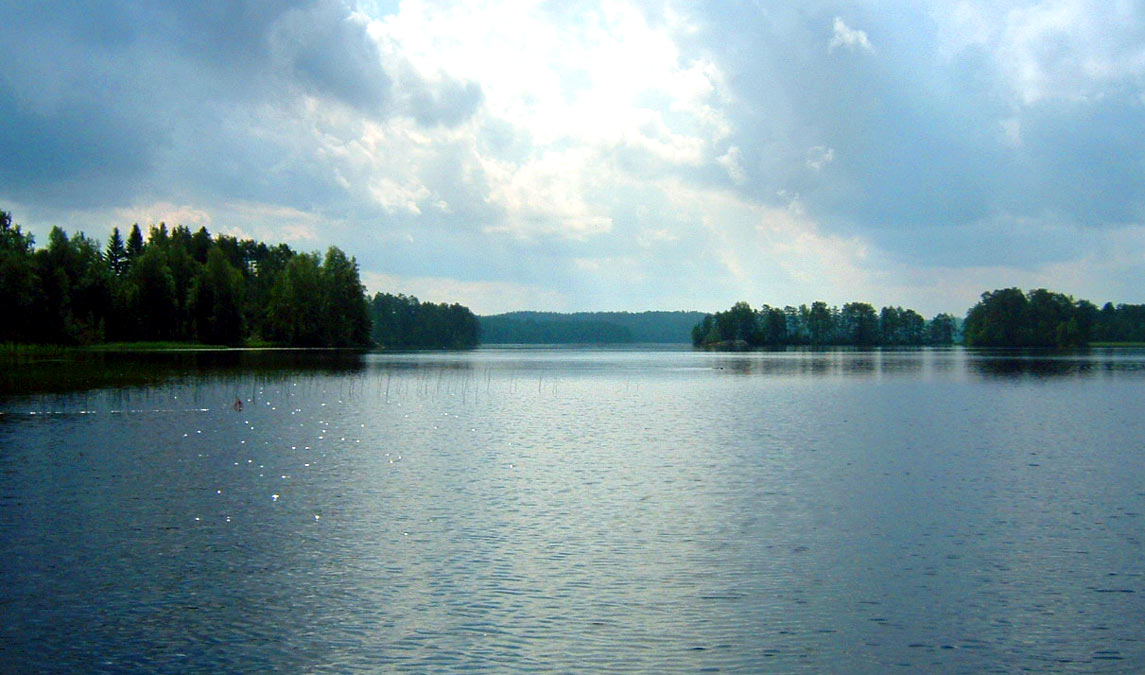
- Mäntyharju is located in the Finnish lake region

- Coat of arms

- Location of Mäntyharju in Finland
- Interactive map of Mäntyharju
- Coordinates: 61°25′N 026°53′E
- Country: Finland
- Region: South Savo
- Sub-region: Mikkeli
- Charter: 1595
- Seat: Mäntyharjun asemanseutu

Government
  - Municipal manager: Juho Järvenpää

Area (2018-01-01)
  - Total: 1,210.98 km^{2} (467.56 sq mi)
  - Land: 981.26 km^{2} (378.87 sq mi)
  - Water: 229.23 km^{2} (88.51 sq mi)
  - Rank: 79th largest in Finland

Population (2025-12-31)
  - Total: 7,034
  - Rank: 131st largest in Finland
  - Density: 7.17/km^{2} (18.6/sq mi)

Population by native language
  - Finnish: 94.1% (official)
  - Swedish: 0.3%
  - Others: 5.6%

Population by age
  - 0 to 14: 11.2%
  - 15 to 64: 51.3%
  - 65 or older: 37.5%
- Time zone: UTC+02:00 (EET)
  - Summer (DST): UTC+03:00 (EEST)
- Website: www.mantyharju.fi

Mäntyharju (Finnish: [ˈmæntyˌhɑrju], lit. 'Pine Ridge') is a municipality of Finland. It is located in the South Savo region, about 40 kilometres (25 mi) southwest of Mikkeli. The municipality has a population of 7,034 (31 December 2025) and covers an area of 1,210.98 square kilometres (467.56 sq mi) of which 229.23 km^{2} (88.51 sq mi) is water. The coastline is almost 1,520 kilometers (940 mi). The population density is 6.2 inhabitants per km².

Neighbouring municipalities: Heinola, Hirvensalmi, Kouvola, Mikkeli, Pertunmaa and Savitaipale. The municipality is unilingually Finnish.

The summer houses or cottages located in the countryside are part of the culture of Finland where most Finnish families spend their summer holidays. Mäntyharju is the municipality which has the fifth most summer houses in Finland. Some of the reasons for Mäntyharju's popularity involve its many pure lakes and a relatively short distance to the Finnish capital Helsinki of approximately 200 kilometres by car. The municipality also has a direct, high-speed train connection to the capital area. Because of the many summer houses, the population of Mäntyharju more than triples during the most popular summer holiday times. Art Centre Salmela in Mäntyharju hosts one of Finland's largest cultural events in July–August.

== Populated places ==
As of 2025, after the merger with the former town municipality of Pertunmaa, Mäntyharju consists of the following populated places:

- Mäntyharju sub-section proper:
  - villages (kylät): Ahvenisto, Enonlahti (Enolahti), Halmeniemi, Hietaniemi, Huopola, Hyyrylä, Jäniskylä, Karankamäki, Kinnilä (Kinni), Korpilahti, Kousanniemi, Kukonkorpi, Kyttälä, Lahnaniemi, Leppäniemi, Luhtanen, Lyytikkälä, Mynttilä, Niinimäki, Nurmaa, Ollikkala, Outila, Paasola, Partsinmaa, Pertunmaa, Poitinniemi, Pärnämäki, Saviniemi, Särkemäki, Tiilikkala, Toivola, Vanonen
  - urban municipal parts (kulmakunnat): Kirkonkylä, Koirakivi, Käävänkylä, Pyhäkoski, Turkinkylä, Valtola, Varpanen
- Pertunmaa sub-section:
  - villages (kylät): Pertunmaa, (Note: Designated as a church village (kirkonkylä).) Kuortti, Hartosenpää, Hölttä, Joutsjärvi, Karankamäki, Kirkonkylä, Koirakivi, Kuhajärvi, Kälkyttä, Lihavanpää, Mansikkamäki, Nipuli, Ruorasmäki, Ruuttila, Sydänmaa, Vastamäki

== History ==
The modern Mäntyharju municipality is on the border between the historical Tavastia, Savonia and Karelia regions. The parish of Mäntyharju was formed in 1595 out of Iitti, Sysmä, Pellosniemi (see Mikkeli, Mikkelin maalaiskunta) and Taipalsaari. Before that, there was already a chapel in the village of Kyttälä, at the time part of Iitti.

After the Treaty of Turku in 1743, western Mäntyharju remained Swedish while the eastern part, including the church, was ceded to Russia. The parts were reunited in 1821, when Old Finland was added to the Grand Duchy. Pertunmaa became a separate parish in May 20th of 1924 and a municipality in 1926, also including smaller parts of Hartola and Joutsa.

== Notable people ==
- Antti Häkkänen (b. 1985), former Minister of Justice of Finland 2017-2019
- Antti Jaatinen (b. 1987), ice hockey player
- Sami Savio - (b. 1975) Politician
- Edward Vesala (1945–1999), Finnish avant-garde jazz composer, bandleader and drummer.
- Kake Randelin (b. 1955), Finnish singer

== See also ==
- Mäntyharjun asemanseutu
- Pertunmaa
- Repovesi National Park
