= Kuopio railway station =

Railway station in Kuopio, Finland

Kuopio
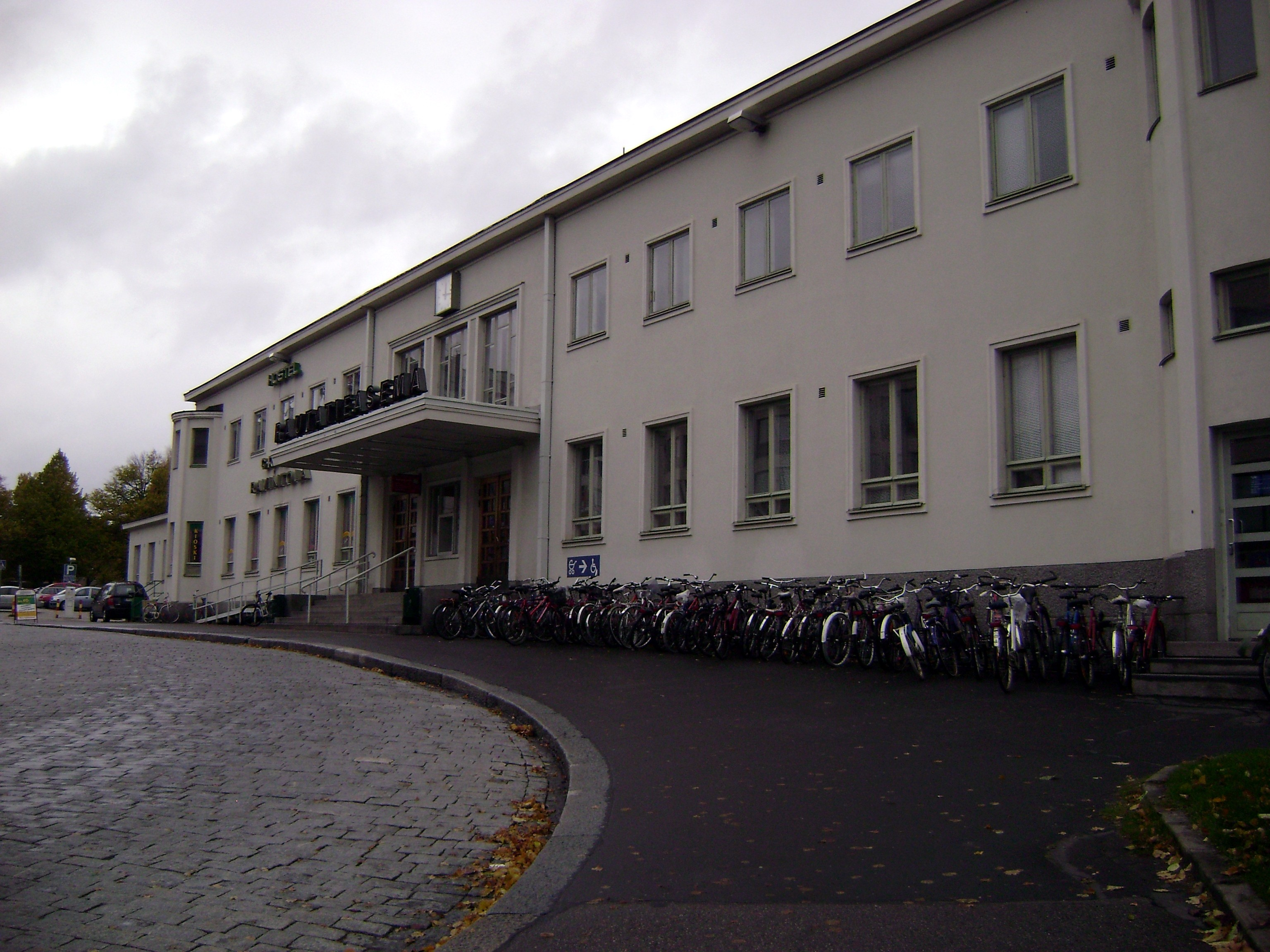

General information
- Location: Asemakatu; 70100 Kuopio
- Coordinates: 62.8970°N 27.6807°E
- System: VR station
- Owner: Finnish Transport Agency
- Platforms: 4
- Tracks: 2

Construction
- Structure type: Ground station

Other information
- Website: VR website

History
- Opened: 1889
- Rebuilt: 1934

Passengers
- 2018: 558,000
Location

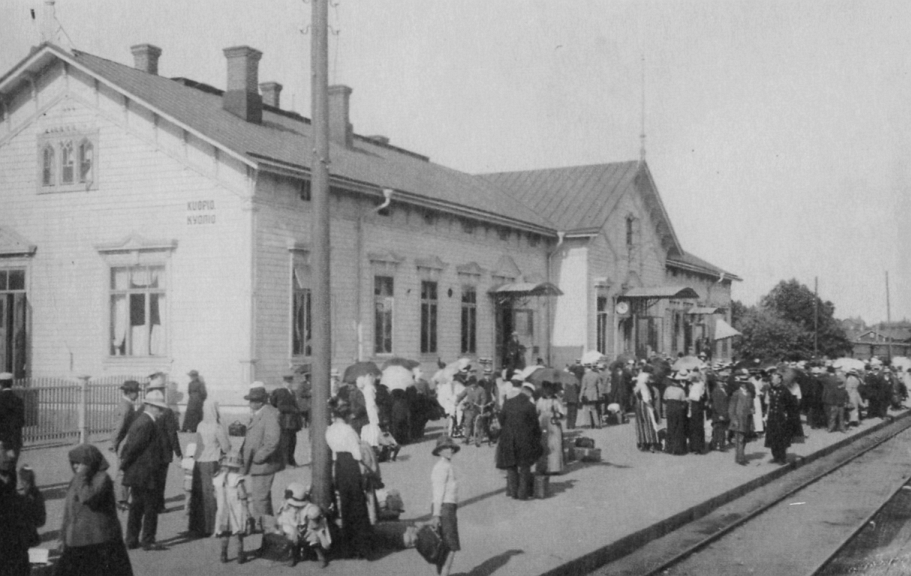
The original station in 1910

Kuopio railway station (Finnish: Kuopion rautatieasema, Swedish: Kuopio järnvägsstation) is located in the Maljalahti district of the city of Kuopio in the Northern Savonia region of Finland. The current concrete station building was completed in 1934, which replaced the original wooden station building situated 900 m (3,000 ft) to the east, which was constructed in 1889; the latter site is now a goods yard.

Asemakatu ("Station Street"), the street on which the station is situated today, was previously named Linnankatu ("Castle Street") in the early 1900s. The name Asemakatu itself was previously used for a stretch of road situated north of the rail bridge at Maaherrankatu ("Landlord Street"). The aforementioned original railway station was located at the eastern end of this Asemakatu; today, this stretch of road is named Pohjolankatu ("North Street").

== Departure tracks ==
Kuopio railway station has three platform tracks:

- Track 1 is used by the majority of passenger train services both towards Helsinki and Kajaani.
- Track 2 is used by one train service to Helsinki via Kouvola as well as by one train service to Tampere via Pieksämäki that runs only on Sundays.
- Track 3 is used by one train service to Helsinki via Pieksämäki and Tampere.
