= Savo railway =

Railway line in Finland

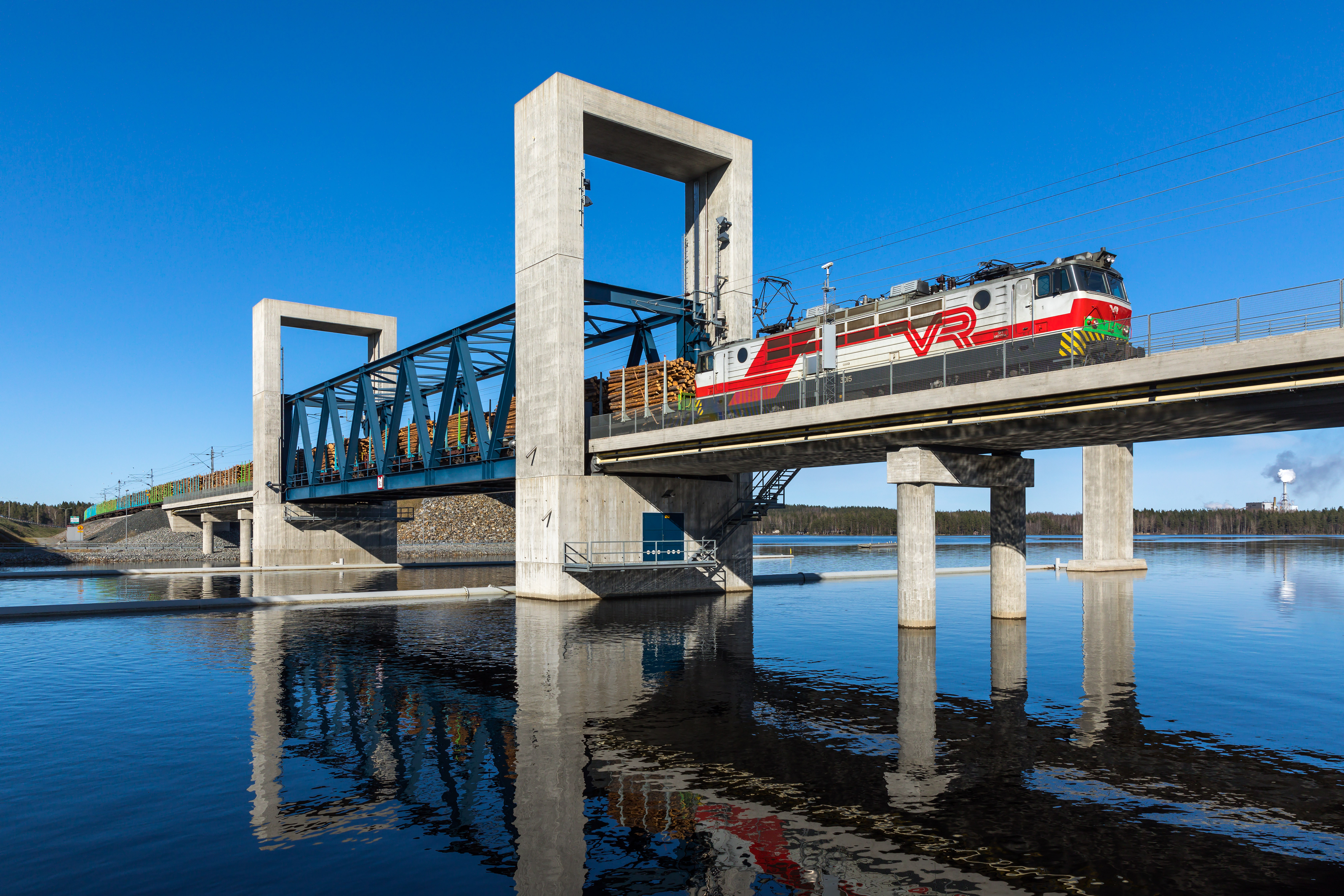
- A Sr1-pulled lumber train crossing the drawbridge north of Kuopio

Overview
- Status: Open
- Owner: Finnish government
- Locale: Kymenlaakso; South Savo; North Savo
- Termini: Kouvola; Iisalmi

Service
- Operator(s): VR Group

History
- Opened: 1 October 1889

Technical
- Line length: 357.8 km (222.3 mi)
- Number of tracks: 1
- Track gauge: 1,524 mm (5 ft)
- Electrification: 25 kV @ 50 Hz

The Savo railway (Finnish: Savon rata; Swedish: Savolaxbanan) is a five-foot-gauge (1,524 mm) railway in Finland. Beginning at Kouvola, it connects southern Finland with the eastern regions of South Savo and North Savo via the cities of Pieksämäki, Kuopio and Iisalmi.

== History ==
Plans to build a railway through Savo began in the 1870s. The alignment of the line was controversial and several different versions were proposed. Initially, the construction of a west–east line was proposed, but soon a south–north alignment was settled on. Various plans for the direction of the line included Taavetti–Mikkeli–Kangasniemi–Jyväskylä, Taavetti–Mikkeli–Varkaus–Kuopio and Kaipiainen–Mikkeli–Suonenjoki–Kuopio, among others. On 17 April 1885, the Diet of Finland decided to build the line via Kouvola, Mikkeli, Pieksämäki and Suonenjoki to Kuopio.

Construction of the line began in 1886; the size of the workforce peaked at 10,000 people. The section first completed was the one between the stations of Mikkeli and Kuopio in 1888, but the Senate did not give permission for traffic to begin. The entire railway was inaugurated on 1 October 1889. The line was effectively extended towards the southern coast the following year upon the completion of the Kouvola–Kotka railway.

In 1900, the Diet made the decision to extend the Savo line from Kuopio via Iisalmi to Kajaani. One of the largest construction projects was the bridge and embankment connection over river Kallavesi, the Kallansillat. Traffic to Iisalmi started on 1 July 1902 and traffic to Kajaani started on 16 October 1904.

In 1960, a 15-year overhaul of the Savo line began, including the straightening of various notable curves, which resulted in a straighter line and higher speeds. The railway was effectively rebuilt from the ground up at points. The most significant jobs were carried out between Kouvola and Mikkeli and Suonenjoki and Kuopio. The first major change was the straightening of the very first curve of the line in Kouvola, and major curve corrections were made at Vuohijärvi, Hillosensalmi, Suonenjoki station and Kurkimäki and Pitkälahti in Kuopio, among others. Many of the corrections involved construction of tunnels and excavation of bedrock.

== Services ==
VR Group operates long-distance services with InterCity and Pendolino type rolling stock on the Savo railway.

== See also ==
- Savo Railway Museum
