= Lapponia (train) =

Passenger train service operated by the Finnish State Railways in 1972–1994

The Lapponia was an express passenger train operated by the Finnish State Railways, the predecessor of the current national rail traffic operator VR Group. The Lapponia trains operated on a direct route from Oulu via Seinäjoki and Tampere to Helsinki. Southbound Lapponia trains departed from Oulu at 7:00am, arriving in Helsinki at approximately 2:00pm. The returning northbound train left Helsinki at 4:00pm, arriving in Oulu at 10:45pm.

The Lapponia express train service began in 1974 as a fast and direct connection between Oulu and the nation's capital. In the beginning the trains had a maximum allowed speed of 120 kilometers per hour (74.5 miles per hour), but it was increased to 140 km/h (87.0 mph) in sections where the electrification was completed.

The Lapponia trains ran under that name until 1994 when Finnish State Railways discontinued the use of train-specific naming. More or less the same time express passenger trains were superseded by intercity train service.

== Scheduled stops for Lapponia trains in 1987 ==
The northbound Lapponia train (numbered EP 57) running on Helsinki–Oulu route stopped in 1987 at following stations:

- Helsinki Central (the train originated at Ilmala yard)
- Tampere
- Seinäjoki
- Kauhava
- Bennäs (Pännäinen)
- Kokkola
- Kannus
- Ylivieska
- Oulainen
- Vihanti
- Oulu, where the trains terminated

The southbound Lapponia train (numbered EP 50) running on Oulu–Helsinki route stopped also at railway stations in Parkano and Hämeenlinna.
