= Jaatinen =

Origin
- Language: Finnish
- Region of origin: Finland

Jaatinen is a Finnish surname.

== Geographical distribution ==
As of 2014, 90.2% of all known bearers of the surname Jaatinen were residents of Finland, 2.8% of Australia, 2.0% of Sweden, 1.4% of Estonia and 1.2% of Canada.

In Finland, the frequency of the surname was higher than national average (1:2,099) in the following regions:

1. North Karelia (1:839)
2. Southern Savonia (1:947)
3. Central Finland (1:1,102)
4. South Karelia (1:1,249)
5. Päijänne Tavastia (1:1,681)
6. Tavastia Proper (1:1,759)
7. Uusimaa (1:1,867)
8. Southern Ostrobothnia (1:1,920)
9. Kymenlaakso (1:2,035)

== People ==
- Antti Jaatinen, ice hockey player
- Arno Jaatinen (1895–1946), military figure
- Jussi Jaatinen (1899–1968), playwright
- Margit Jaatinen, Miss Finland competitor in 1958
- Marjatta Jaatinen (1927–2003), architect
- Martti Jaatinen (1928–2008), architect
- Matti Jaatinen (1928–2005), Finnish politician
- Olli Jaatinen, bass player
- Pekka Jaatinen, writer
- Stig Jaatinen (1918–1999), professor of geography
- Timo Jaatinen, politician from Helsinki
- Toivo Jaatinen, sculptor, Saltus Award winner in 2002
