= Oulu–Kontiomäki railway =

Railway line in Finland

- Location of the railway line in Finland

Overview
- Owner: Finnish Transport Agency
- Locale: Finland
- Termini: Oulu; Kontiomäki
- Stations: 6

Service
- Operator(s): VR Group

History
- Opened: 1926–1930

Technical
- Line length: 166.1 km (103.2 mi)
- Track gauge: 1,524 mm (5 ft)
- Electrification: Overhead catenary, 2 × 25 kV
- Operating speed: 140 km/h (87 mph)

Oulu–Kontiomäki railway is a railway line in Finland. The line is owned and maintained by the Finnish Rail Administration. It connects the city of Oulu to Kontiomäki station, which is a junction of five railway lines in Paltamo municipality, approximately 26 kilometres (16 mi) north from the city of Kajaani. The line is single-tracked and electrified with a total length of 166.1 kilometres (103.2 mi). The traffic is controlled via centralized traffic control by the operator located in Oulu rail traffic control center at Oulu railway station.

Starting from Oulu, the line extends eastward, generally following the southern bank of Oulu River until it reaches Vaala station, where the line crosses over the river. From thereon, the line runs on the north side of Lake Oulujärvi, only reaching the lakeshore briefly in Paltamo and following the north shore before reaching Kontiomäki station.

The electrification was taken in commercial service on December 1, 2006, the power was turned on on October 1, 2006. First commercial electric-powered trains ran on November 1, 2006. The maximum allowed speed is 140 kilometres per hour (87 mph) in passenger service, and 100 kilometres per hour (62 mph) in freight service.

Centralized traffic control installation was completed and taken in service in 1998.

== Traffic ==
Traffic consists of a mixture of passenger and freight trains. Most of the traffic is freight traffic originating at Kontiomäki, Uimaharju (on Joensuu–Kontiomäki line) and Vartius. The only operator is the national rail operator VR. There are eight daily passenger trains (four in each direction).

The line is most noted for the presence of heavy taconite unit trains. These trains originate in Kostomuksha, Russia, and terminate in Kokkola, Finland, where the ore is transloaded in to bulk ships. Previously taconite train also ran to Rautaruukki steel mill in Raahe, but this traffic ceased early in 2007, when Rautaruukki decided to order the taconite from LKAB in Sweden. Other primary commodities carried on the line is timber and pulpwood.

== History ==
The line was built in five sections over the course of four years. First segment to be taken in service was a line from Vuokatti to Paltamo via Kontiomäki in 1926. After this eastern segment was built, a line east from Oulu to Muhos was taken in service in 1927, followed by Muhos to Utajärvi in 1928, and Utajärvi to Vaala in 1929. The last segment, joining Vaala with Paltamo was completed in 1930.

On May 23, 1995, an avoiding line was taken in service at Kontiomäki. This enabled the traffic between Vartius and Oulu to bypass the Kontiomäki station, without the need to perform run-around moves at Kontiomäki yard.

== Connections with other lines ==
Oulu–Kontiomäki line connects with the Seinäjoki–Oulu main line and Oulu–Tornio main line at Oulu. At Kontiomäki the line connects with two main lines: Iisalmi–Kontiomäki and Joensuu–Kontiomäki, as well as with freight-only branch lines Kontiomäki–Vartius and Kontiomäki–Ämmänsaari.
