= Oulu City Theatre =

Theatre in Oulu, Finland

- Oulun teatteri
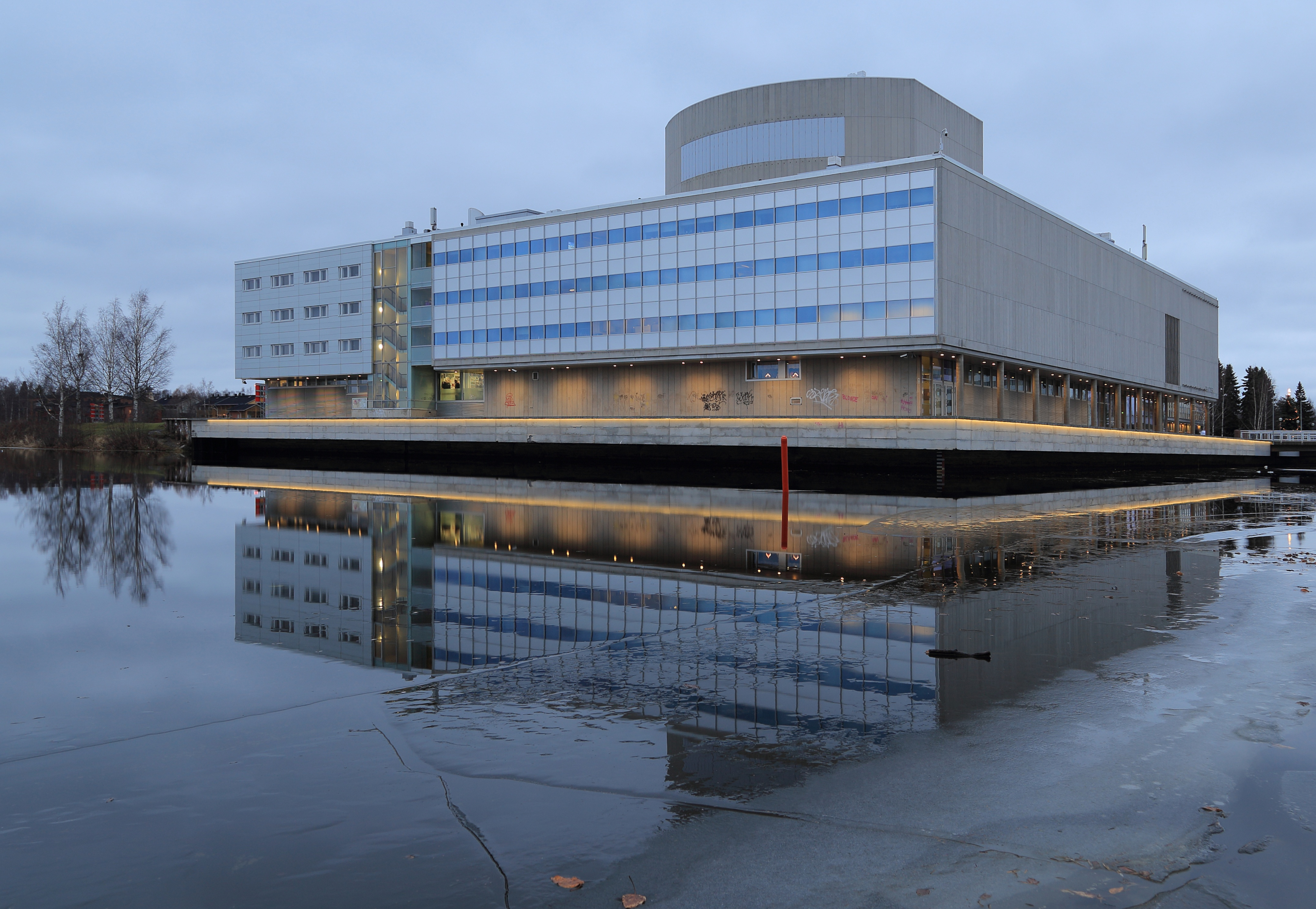
- Interactive map of Oulu City Theatre
- Address: Kaarlenväylä 2 Oulu; Finland
- Coordinates: 65°00′53″N 025°27′47″E
- Owner: City of Oulu
- Capacity: 527 (the main stage)
- Type: Regional theatre

Construction
- Opened: Theatre building completed in 1972, the theatre established in 1931
- Renovated: 2004, Sampo Valjus
- Architects: Marjatta Jaatinen and Martti Jaatinen

Website
- Oulu City Theatre

Oulu City Theatre (Finnish: Oulun teatteri) is a municipal theatre in Oulu, Finland. The current theatre building is located in the Vänmanninsaari island close to the market square in the city centre.

The theatre was established in 1931 as Oulun Näyttämö (literally Oulu Stage), name was changed to Oulun teatteri (Oulu Theatre) in 1951. The theatre became municipally owned in 1965 and its name was changed to Oulu City Theatre. At the time the theatre performed in the Oulu City Hall. The first specifically designed theatre hall, the current theatre, was opened in 1972. The building was designed by architects Marjatta Jaatinen and Matti Jaatinen.

The theatre was renovated and extended in 2002–2004. After the renovation there are four stages in the theatre with the main stage having 527 seats.
