= Kajaani railway station =

Railway station in Kajaani, Finland

Coordinates: 64°13′12″N 27°44′19″E

Kajaani Kajana
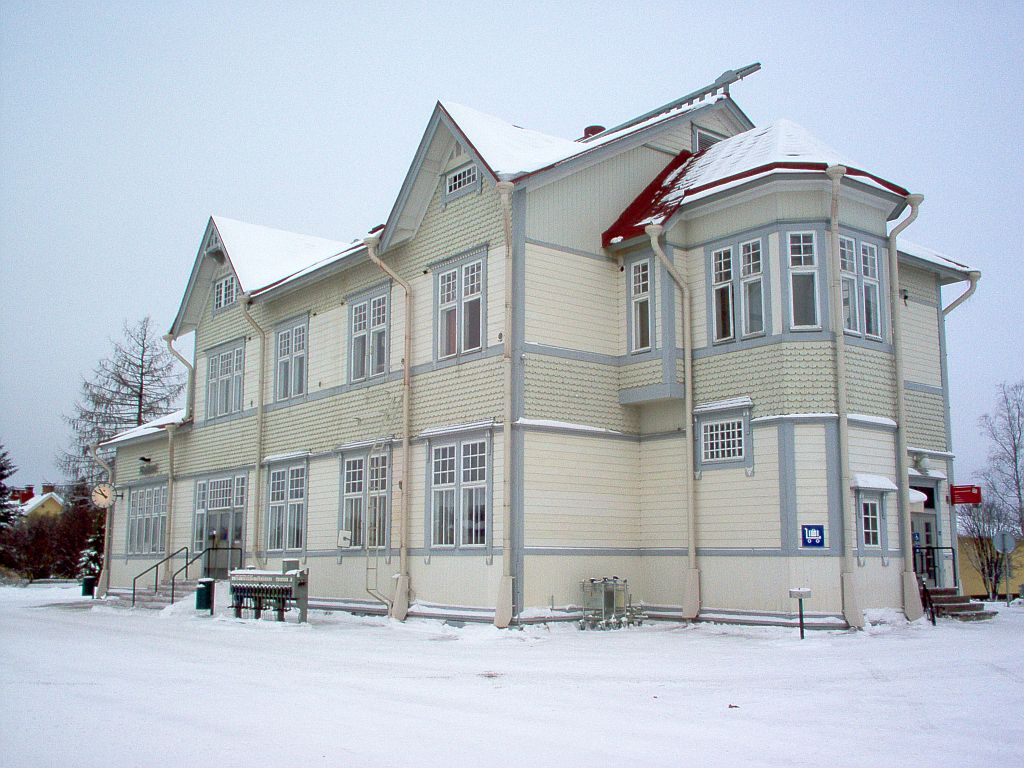

General information
- Location: 87100 Kajaani
- System: VR station
- Owner: Finnish Transport Agency
- Platforms: 2

Construction
- Structure type: ground station

History
- Opened: 1905

Passengers
- 2016: 180,900
Location

The Kajaani railway station was built from 1904 to 1905, when the railway from Iisalmi to Kajaani was completed as an extension to the Savonia railway. The station building was designed by Gustaf Nyström. This Jugend-style building has been called the most beautiful station building in Finland.

== Services ==
Kajaani is served by train services that travel via the Savonia railway up to Kajaani. Some of them terminate at Kajaani, while some continue via Kontiomäki to Oulu.

The station has a ticket vending machine and a ticket sales office. The waiting room is open during train service hours.

== Departure tracks ==
Kajaani railway station has two platform tracks. Passenger trains that stop at/depart from the station mainly use track 1 (with the exception of train services 62 (InterCity/Pendolino) and IC 67, which use track 2). When two trains meet at the station southbound trains towards Kuopio use track 1 and northbound trains to Oulu use track 2.

== Trackyard ==
The Kajaani station trackyard underwent a large amount of upgrade and repair work in 2005, when the railway from Iisalmi to Kontiomäki was electrified. Also the manual switchboard on the Kajaani station trackyard was dismantled. Nowadays the traffic is handled remotely from Iisalmi railway station.

The trackyard has two tracks for passenger transport and five tracks for cargo transport. The trackyard has a track connection to the Lamminniemi paper factory and towards Petäisenniska.

Preceding station	VR Group	Following station
Sukeva towards Kouvola	Kouvola–Oulu	Kontiomäki towards Oulu
