= Muhos railway station =

Railway station in Finland

Coordinates: 64.805625°N 25.992408°E

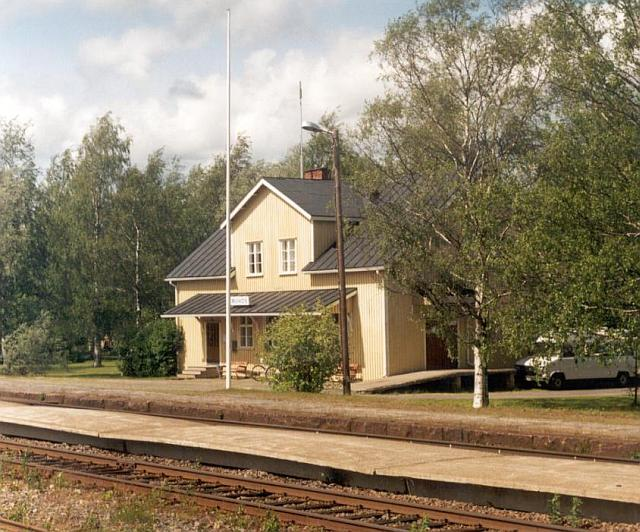
Muhos railway station

Muhos railway station is a railway station in the municipality of Muhos in the Northern Ostrobothnia region in Finland on the Oulu–Kontiomäki railway line. It is the second station east from Oulu railway station and the first passenger service station east from Oulu. The station was opened in 1927, and it was a staffed station until in 1998 when centralized traffic control was installed.

== Passenger and freight service ==
Passenger trains are operated by the national railway operator VR Group. There are eight daily passenger trains stopping at Muhos, four westbound and four eastbound.

As of 2007 there is no freight service available in Muhos.

== Railyard and departure tracks ==
The railyard at Muhos consists of east–west main track (number 1), with 1,054-metre (3,458 ft) and 644-metre (2,113 ft) passing loops on the south side of main track. There is also a fourth track, a 348-metre (1,142 ft) spur track alongside a loading platform. This fourth track is the southernmost track and only accessible from the east end.

All passenger trains that stop at the station use track 1.

Preceding station	VR Group	Following station
Utajärvi towards Kouvola	Kouvola–Oulu	Oulu Terminus
