= Jakobstad-Pedersöre railway station =

Railway station in Pedersöre, Finland

Jakobstad-Pedersöre Pietarsaari-Pedersöre
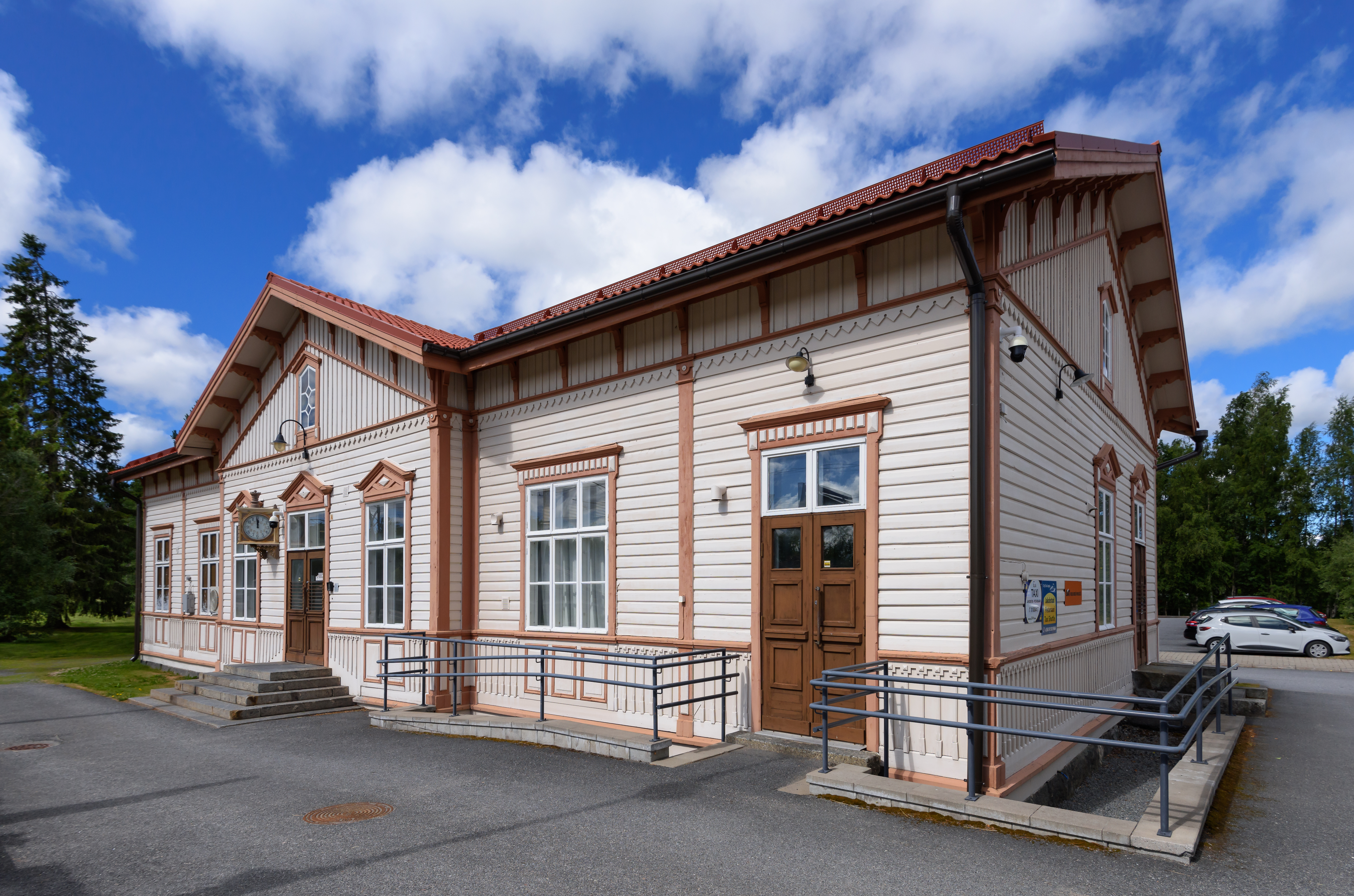

General information
- Location: Stationsvägen 13, 68910; Bennäs, Pedersöre; Finland
- Coordinates: 63°35′44″N 22°47′25″E
- System: VR station
- Owner: Finnish Transport Infrastructure Agency
- Line: Seinäjoki–Oulu
- Platforms: 3

Construction
- Structure type: Ground station

Other information
- Station code: Pnä
- Classification: Operating point

History
- Opened: 1 November 1886
- Electrified: 1981
- Former names: Bennäs/Pännäinen (until 15 June 2020)

Passengers
- 2019: 100,000

Services
Preceding station	VR Group	Following station
Härmä towards Seinäjoki	Seinäjoki–Oulu	Kokkola towards Oulu
Kauhava towards Helsinki	Helsinki–Kolari (overnight service)	Kokkola towards Kolari
Former services
Preceding station	Finnish State Railways	Following station
Kauhava towards Helsinki	Lapponia	Kokkola towards Oulu
Location

Jakobstad-Pedersöre railway station (Swedish: Jakobstad-Pedersöre järnvägsstation, Finnish: Pietarsaari-Pedersören rautatieasema) is located in the village and urban area of Bennäs in the municipality of Pedersöre, Ostrobothnia, Finland. The station serves as the passenger station of the nearby city of Jakobstad. The station building was completed in 1885.

The Finnish Heritage Agency has proclaimed the station building a nationally significant built cultural environment.

== Name ==
Upon the station's opening in 1886, it was originally called Pedersö in both Swedish and Finnish. Exactly one year later, however, the name was changed to Bennäs (initially spelled in Finnish as Pännäis), as the old name may be translated into Finnish as Pietarsaari – the name of the city of Jakobstad, causing confusion. At some point, the Finnish spelling was changed to Pännäinen.

The station was again renamed Jakobstad-Pedersöre on 15 June 2020.

== History ==
Pedersö was one of the original stations of the Seinäjoki–Oulu railway, and its location was chosen based on its proximity to the Pedersöre Church, as well as the city of Jakobstad. The station was opened for traffic along with the rest of the Kokkola–Oulu section on 1 November 1886, and the next year, the building of a branch line from the station to the city was finished. The village of Bennäs grew from the railway's influence, and upon the parish village's annexation to Jakobstad in 1950, it became the new administrative center of the municipality.

In 2006, Bennäs was made an unstaffed station and its ticket sales services were abolished. The station was completely rebuilt in 2017: elevators were installed and the single low side platform was replaced with a new one, as well as an all-new island platform, both of which were built to the 55 centimetres (22 in) high standard for use with low-floor trains. The platforms were equipped with new shelters and benches.

In 2018–2019, a wye connecting the Jakobstad branch to the Seinäjoki–Oulu line on the south side of Bennäs was built. In the past, freight trains bound for Jakobstad from the south had to first travel north to Kokkola, where the orientation of the locomotive would be changed, and then back south towards Jakobstad via Bennäs. The wye cut the travel time for these trains by two hours and alleviated the capacity issues in the Kokkola railyard. The planning phase of the project cost approximately €7,000,000, and the construction approximately €5,070,000. The wye was opened for traffic on 25 February 2019.

== Architecture ==
The station building was constructed according to type 2 stock blueprints for class IV stations on the Ostrobothnian railway. It represents the style of Neo-Renaissance, and is presumed to have been designed by Knut Nylander, the Finnish State Railways architect at the time. The outer surface of the station is relatively plain and devoid of ornamental additions. Other than an extension built in 1928 and additional walls built in the indoor spaces, the building mostly remains in its original appearance from the 1880s. It was renovated in June–November 2015; outer surfaces were repainted and the roof was rebuilt.

The premises of the station also include a freight warehouse, guardhouses, barns, saunas and sheds, as well as several other buildings related to the living quarters.

== Services ==
Jakobstad-Pedersöre is served by most InterCity and Pendolino trains on the route Helsinki–Seinäjoki–Ylivieska–Oulu–Rovaniemi, as well as the nighttime express trains between Helsinki and Kolari. A connecting bus service is operated between the station and the Jakobstad bus station.
