= Oulu City Library =

Public library in Oulu, Finland

- Oulun kaupunginkirjasto
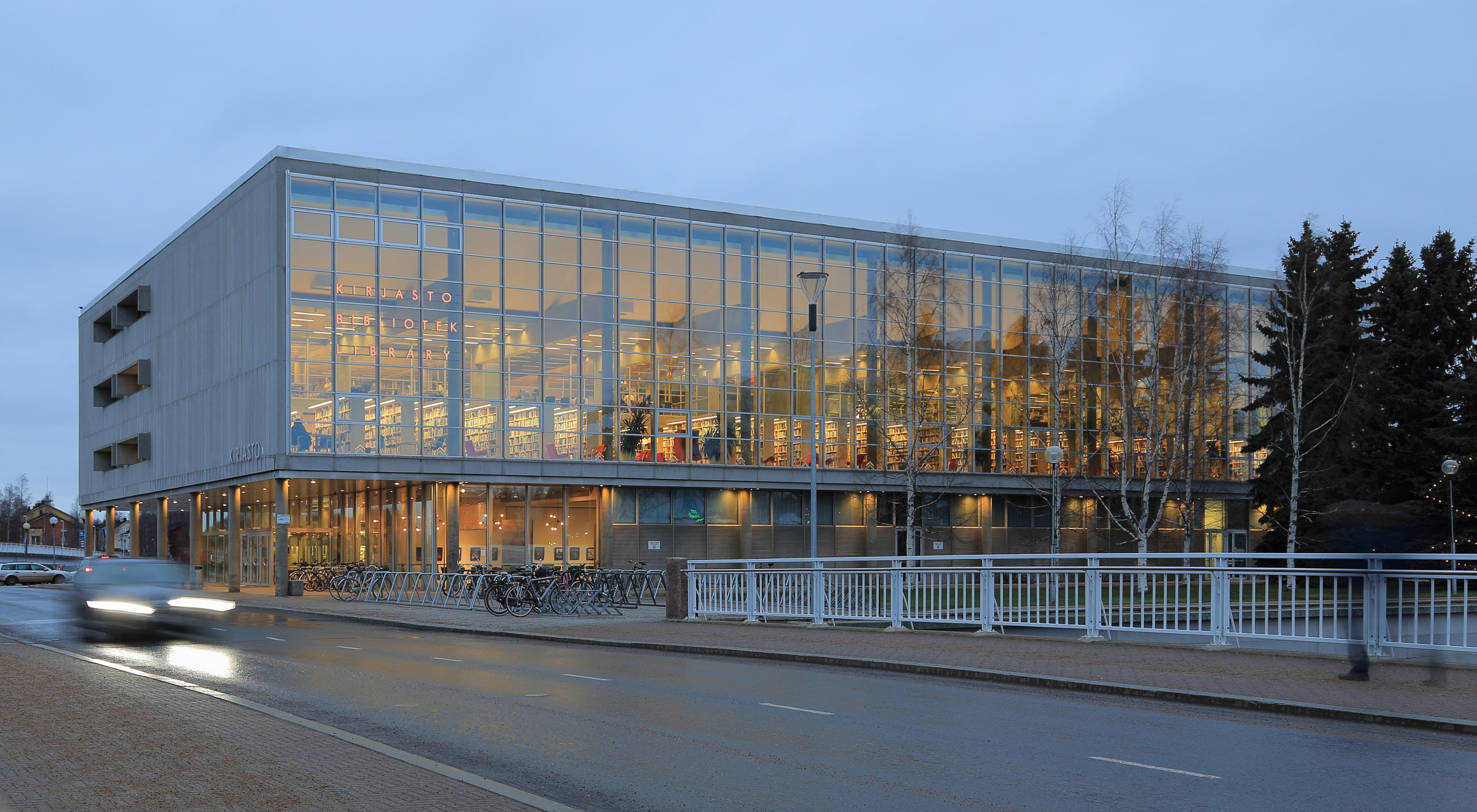
- Oulu City Main Library building
- 65°00′55″N 025°27′48″E
- Location: Oulu, Finland
- Type: Public library
- Established: 1877
- Branches: 24

Collection
- Size: 840,000

Access and use
- Circulation: 1,5M

Other information
- Budget: €8,000,000 ($11,000,000)
- Employees: 110
- Website: www.ouka.fi/oulu/library

Oulu City Library (Finnish: Oulun kaupunginkirjasto) is a municipal and regional library in Oulu, Finland. The main library building is located in the city centre near the market square. There are also 24 other library branches in the districts of Oulu and a patient library in Oulu University Hospital.

The main library was moved from Northern Ostrobothnia museum building to the present building designed by architects Marjatta Jaatinen and Martti Jaatinen in 1982.

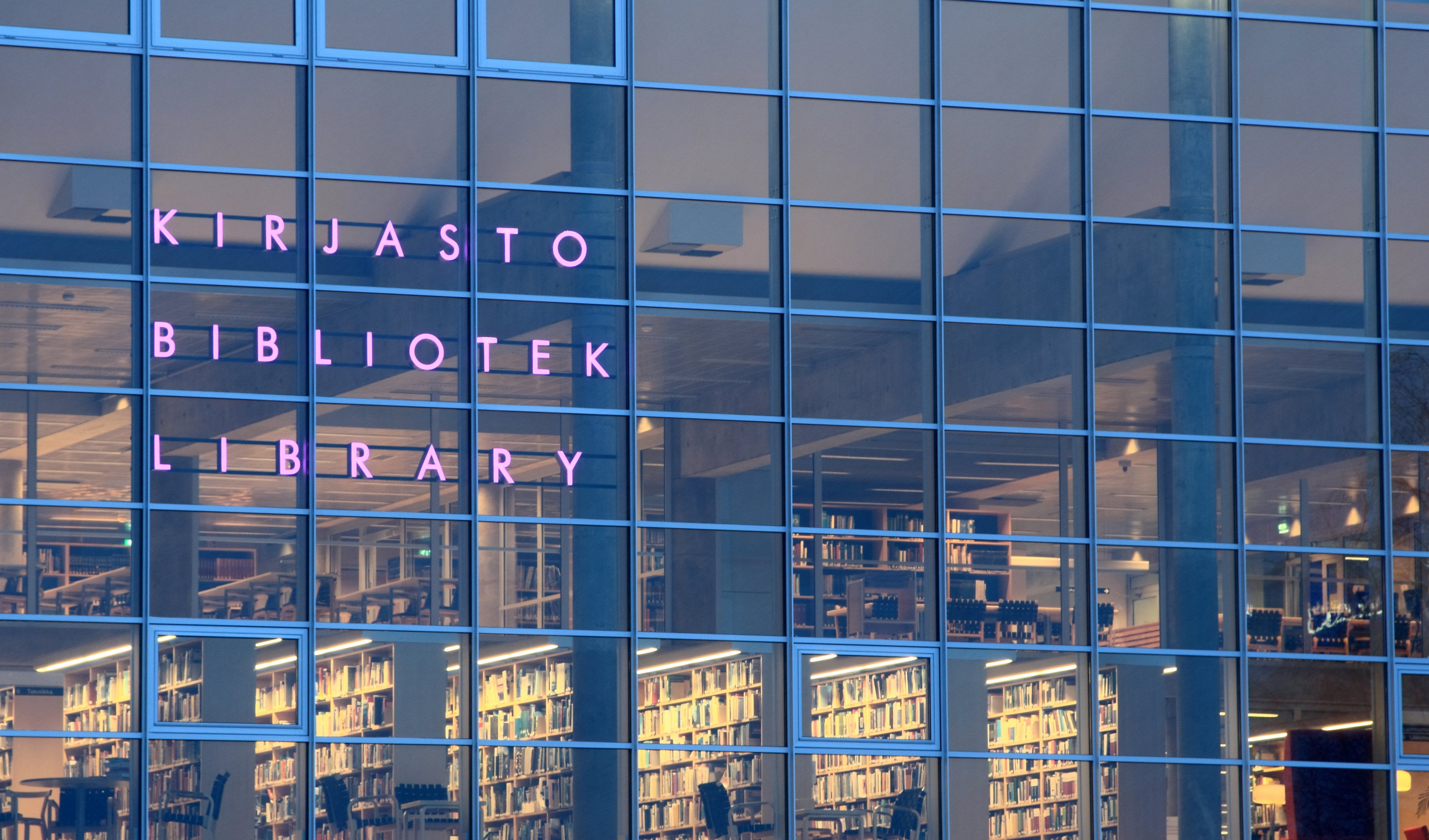

== See also ==
- List of libraries in Finland
