= Bennäs =

Village in Pedersöre, Finland

Coordinates: 63°36′N 022°47.5′E

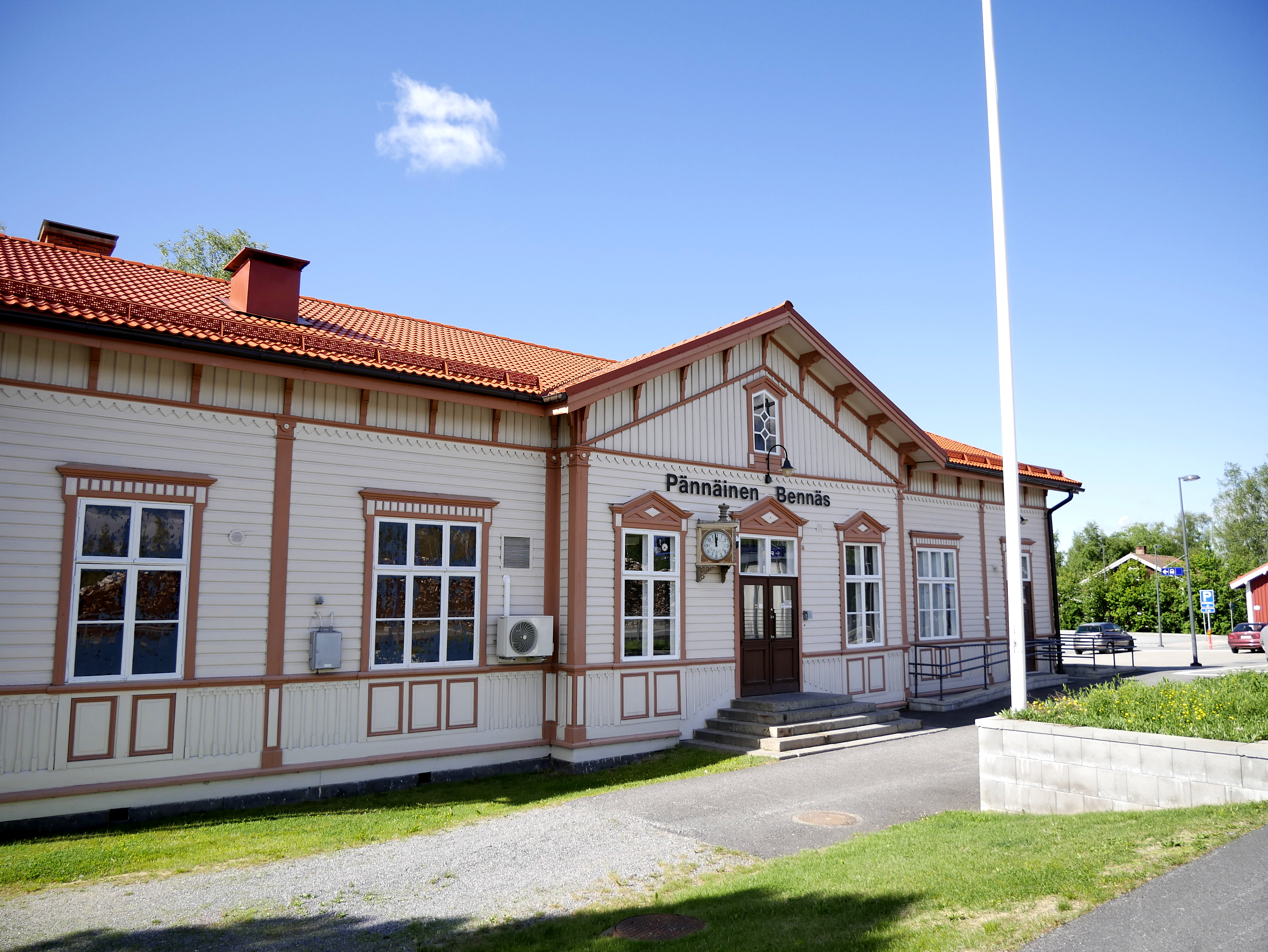
Jakobstad-Pedersöre railway station

Bennäs (Finnish: Pännäinen) is a village, urban area and railway station in the municipality of Pedersöre, Finland. It is the administrative center of the municipality, but the biggest urban area is Kållby. The railway station in Bennäs is called Jakobstad-Pedersöre railway station and operates among other things as the station of Jakobstad.
