= Oulu City Hall =

Municipal government building in Finland

- Oulun kaupungintalo
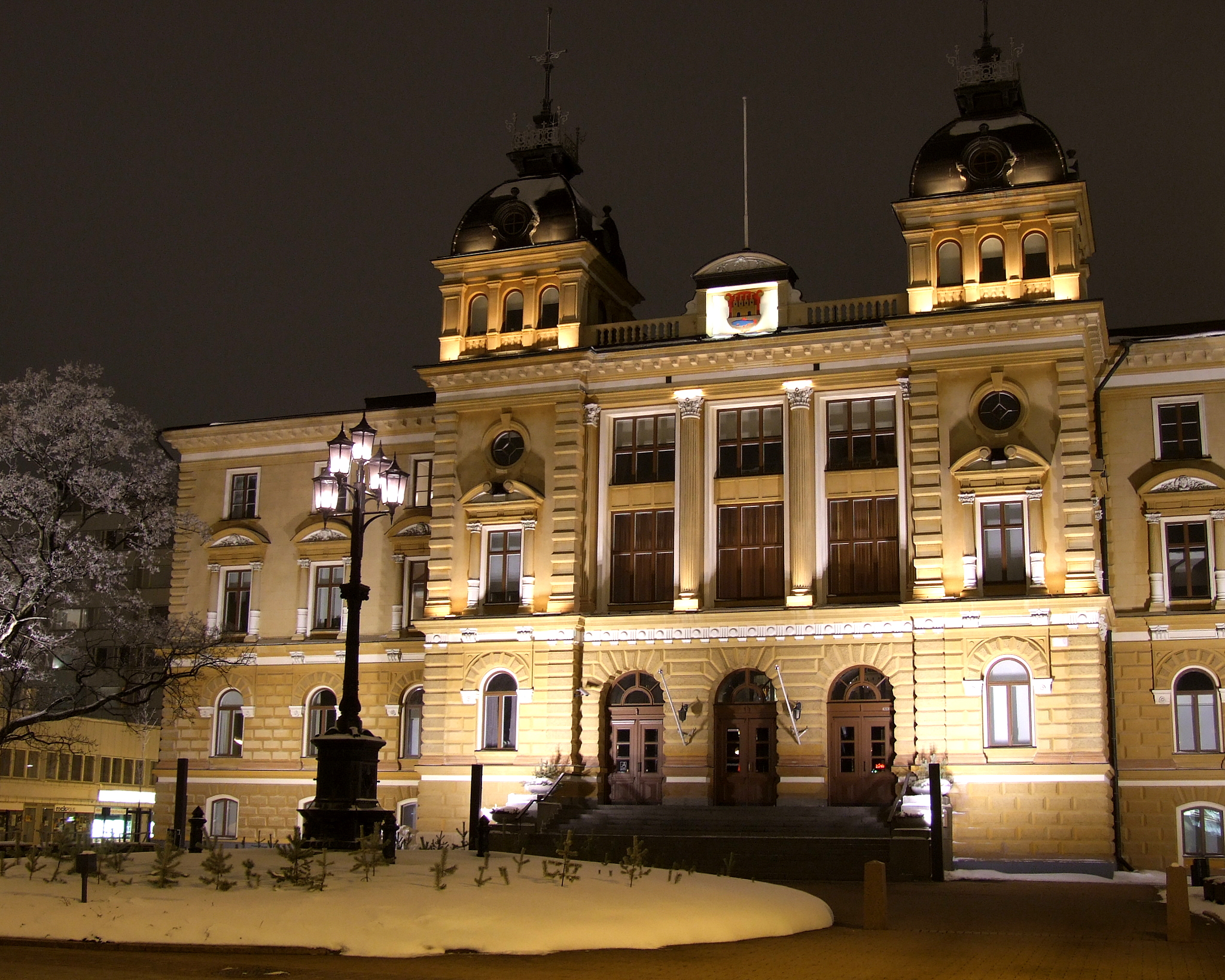
- Oulu City Hall by night
- Interactive map of the Oulu City Hall area
- Former names: Seurahuone

General information
- Architectural style: Neo-Renaissance
- Location: Pokkinen, Oulu, Kirkkokatu 2a
- Coordinates: 65°00′51″N 025°28′19″E
- Completed: 1886
- Renovated: 1920
- Owner: City of Oulu

Design and construction
- Architect: Johan Erik Stenberg

Renovating team
- Architect: Oiva Kallio

Oulu City Hall (Finnish: Oulun kaupungintalo) is the seat for the municipal government of the City of Oulu, Finland. It is located in the Pokkinen district of the central Oulu.

The neo-Renaissance style city hall was designed by a Swedish architect Johan Erik Stenberg as the restaurant and hotel Seurahuone in 1885. The third floor was added and other major changes made in 1920 according to plans of architect Oiva Kallio. Some of the changes were reversed during the renovation in 1978–1982, for example the doors were restored to their original location.

The city council has assembled in the city hall since 21 December 1920 and the municipal government since 7 January 1931. The Oulu City Theatre has also had its facilities in the city hall.
