= Vanhatulli =

Coordinates: 65.0085°N 25.4695°E

- District of Oulu
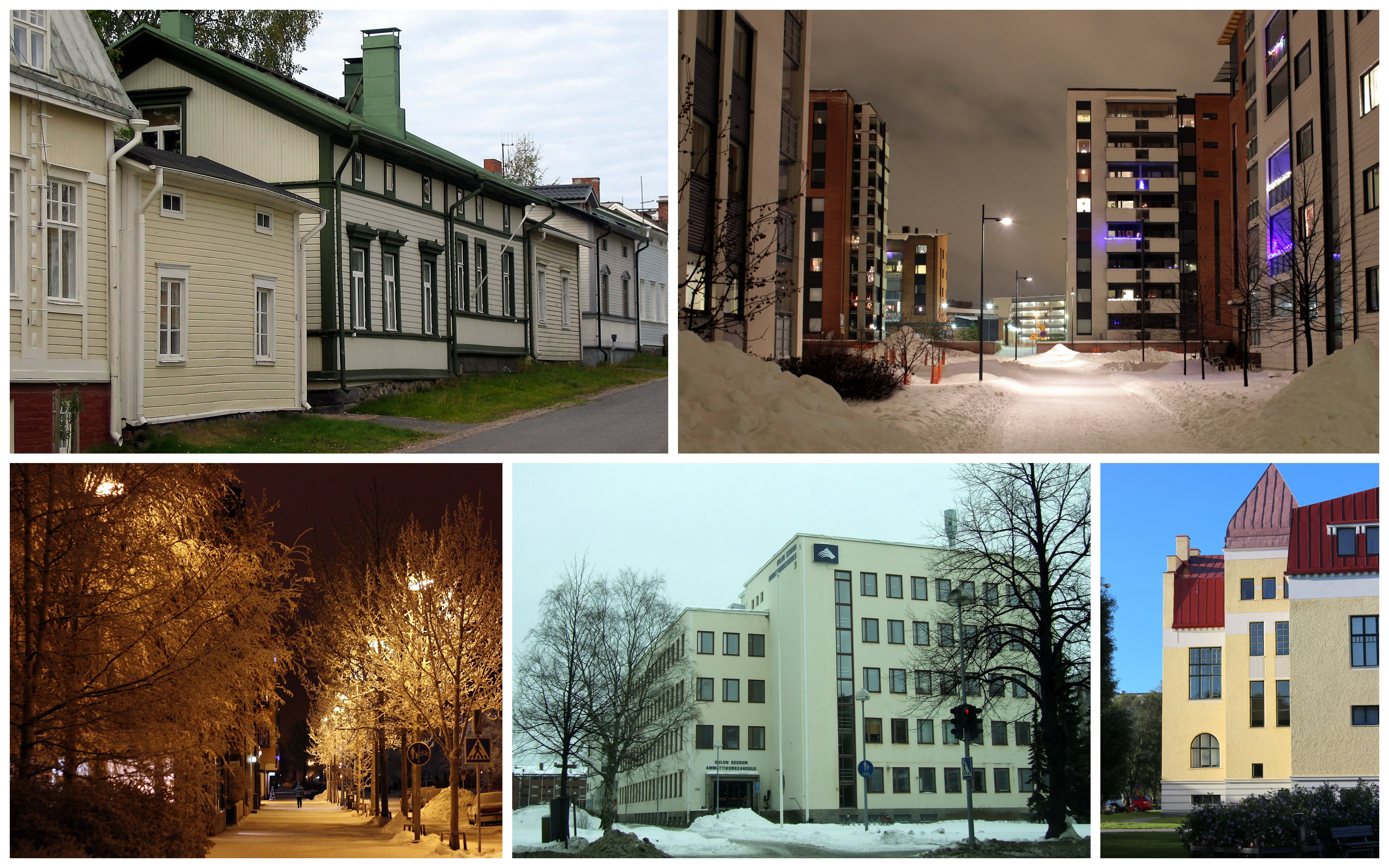
- Interactive map of Vanhatulli
- Country: Finland
- City: Oulu
- Areas of Oulu: City Centre

Population (2013)
  - Total: 4 157
- Postal code: 90100

Vanhatulli is a district of the city centre area of Oulu, Finland. Together with the districts of Pokkinen and Vaara, Vanhatulli forms the central business district of Oulu. It is bounded by the estuary of the Oulujoki river to the west, the Pokkinen and Vaara districts to the north, the Leveri and Hollihaka districts to the south and the railway to the east.

Besides commercial area, Vanhatulli also has got residential neighbourhoods like the historic Kuusiluoto neighbourhood by the river Oulujoki and the new urban neighbourhood of Etu-Lyötty along the railway. The Oulun Suomalaisen Yhteiskoulun Lukio upper secondary school is located in the Kuusiluoto neighbourhood. The Mannerheim Park is located in the centre of Vanhatulli.
