= Chydenia =

Chydenia Shopping Center
- Kauppakeskus Chydenia
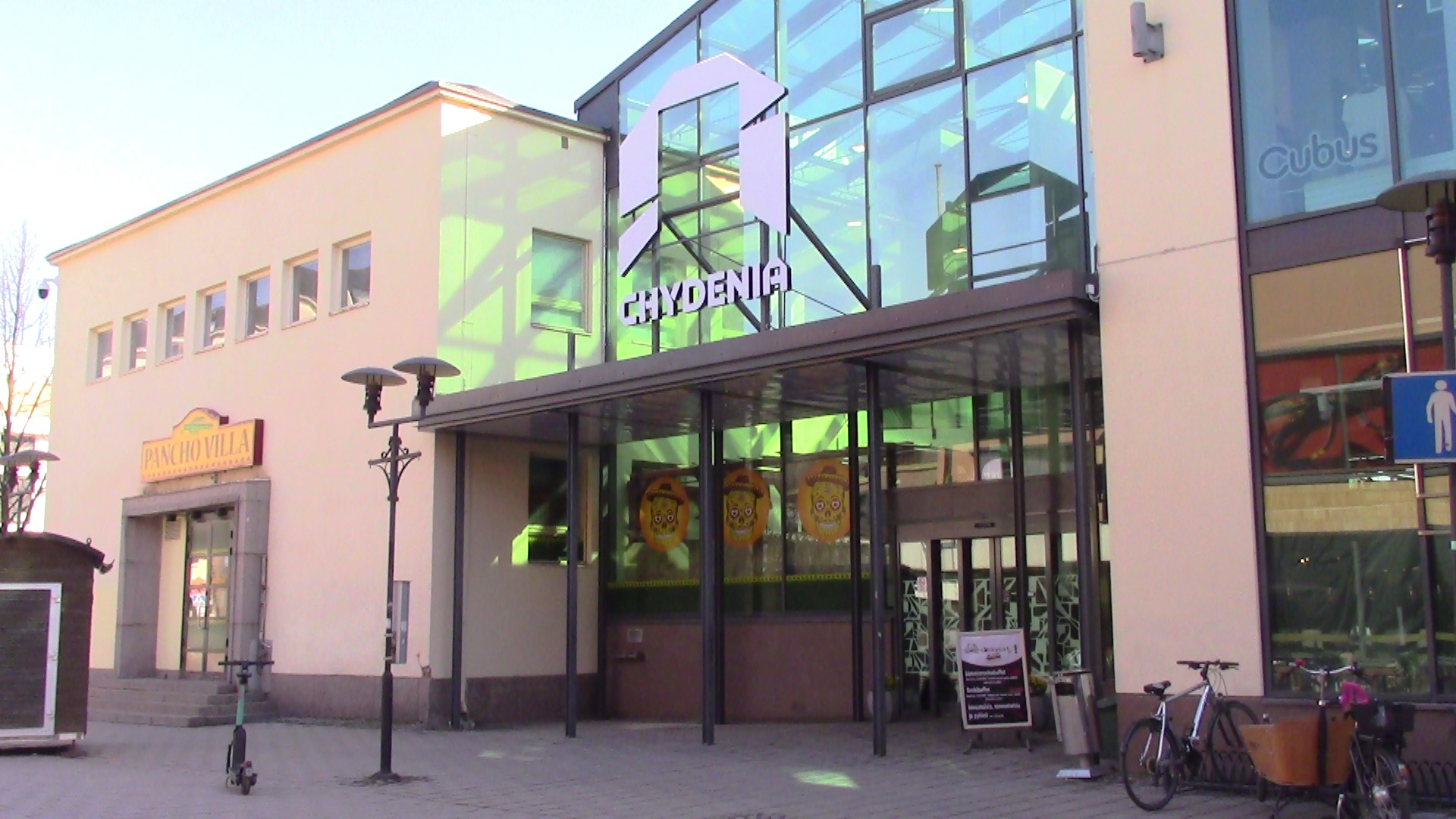
- The entrance of Chydenia
- Location: Kokkola, Finland
- Coordinates: 63°50′07.25″N 23°07′56.20″E
- Opened: 2006
- Owner: Agore Kiinteistöt; Aberdeen European Balanced Property Fund; Samla Capital
- Num. of stores: 45
- Parking: 274
- Website: www.chydenia.fi

The Chydenia Shopping Center Finnish: Kauppakeskus Chydenia) is a shopping mall located in the town center of Kokkola in Central Ostrobothnia, Finland. The first part of the center was completed in 2006, the third in 2009. The shopping center is located partly on the Tehtaankatu, Rantakatu and Rautatienkatu streets, about 100 meters north of Kokkola railway station. The name of the shopping center refers to Anders Chydenius (1729–1803), who mainly influenced in Kokkola.

The first part of Chydenia has three floors, the second part two and the third six, two of which are in business use. There are almost 300 parking spaces in the shopping center. Parking is free in parking lots when using the parking disc. About 2 million people visit Chydenia every year.

Several stores in Chydenia include Suomalainen Kirjakauppa, H&M, Dressmann, Specsavers, Subway, Hesburger and Espresso House.
