= Oulun Suomalaisen Yhteiskoulun Lukio =

Finnish Co-educational Lycée of Oulu
- Oulun Suomalaisen Yhteiskoulun Lukio
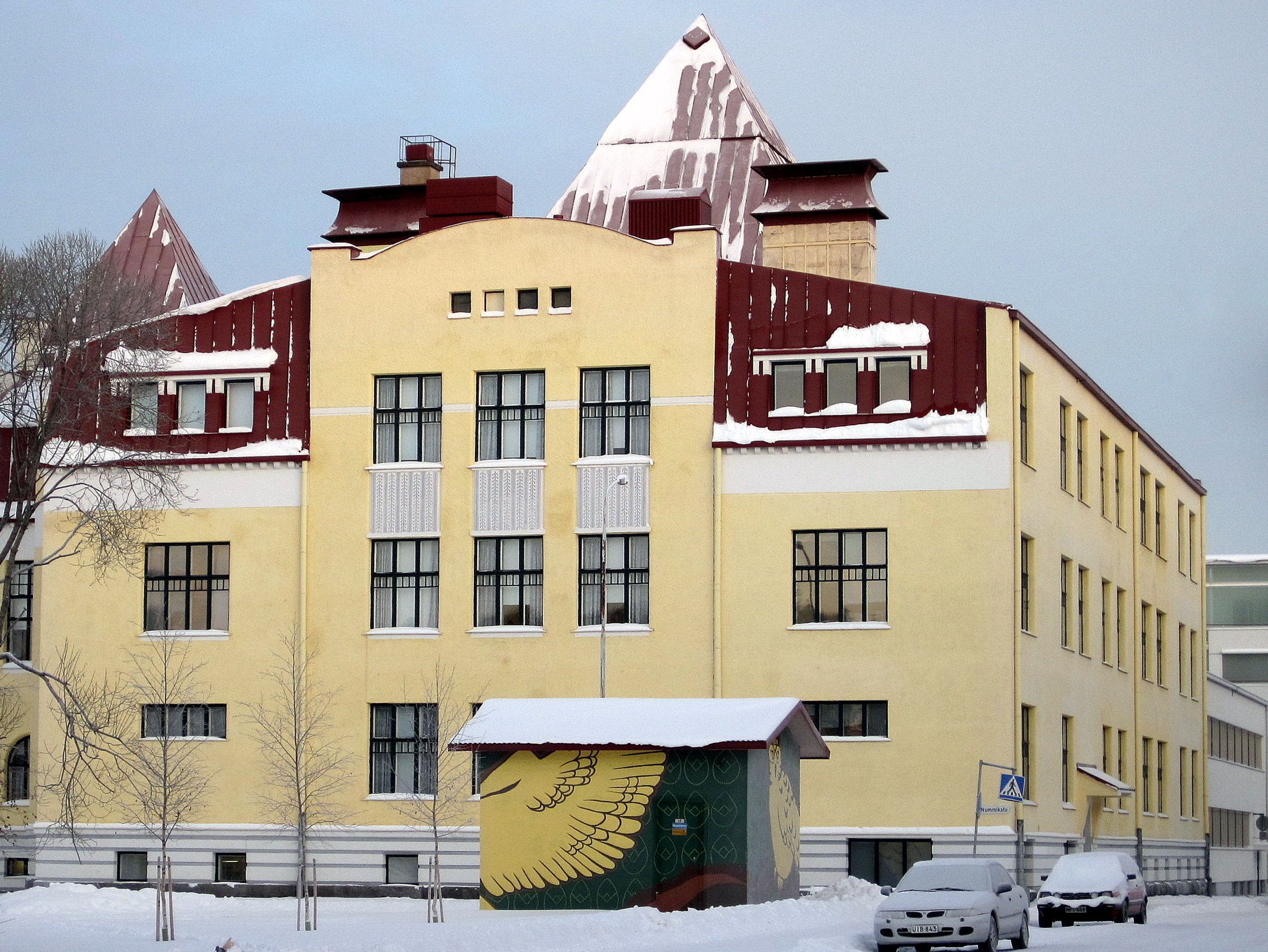

Location
- Maunonkatu 1 Oulu, 90100; Finland
- 65°00′37″N 025°27′36″E

Information
- School type: Public school (since 1920), Upper secondary school
- Opened: 1902
- Principal: Riitta-Mari Punkki-Heikkinen
- Teaching staff: ca. 40
- Publication: Pyramentti
- Website: www.osyk.fi

Oulun Suomalaisen Yhteiskoulun Lukio (abbr. OSYK, English: Finnish Co-educational Lycée of Oulu) is a Finnish-language upper secondary school in Oulu, Finland. The school is located in the Kuusiluoto neighbourhood in the Vanhatulli district in central Oulu.

There are about 40 teachers and about 620 students in OSYK. The school is arts and culture oriented, and it is part of the UNESCO Associated Schools Network.

== History ==
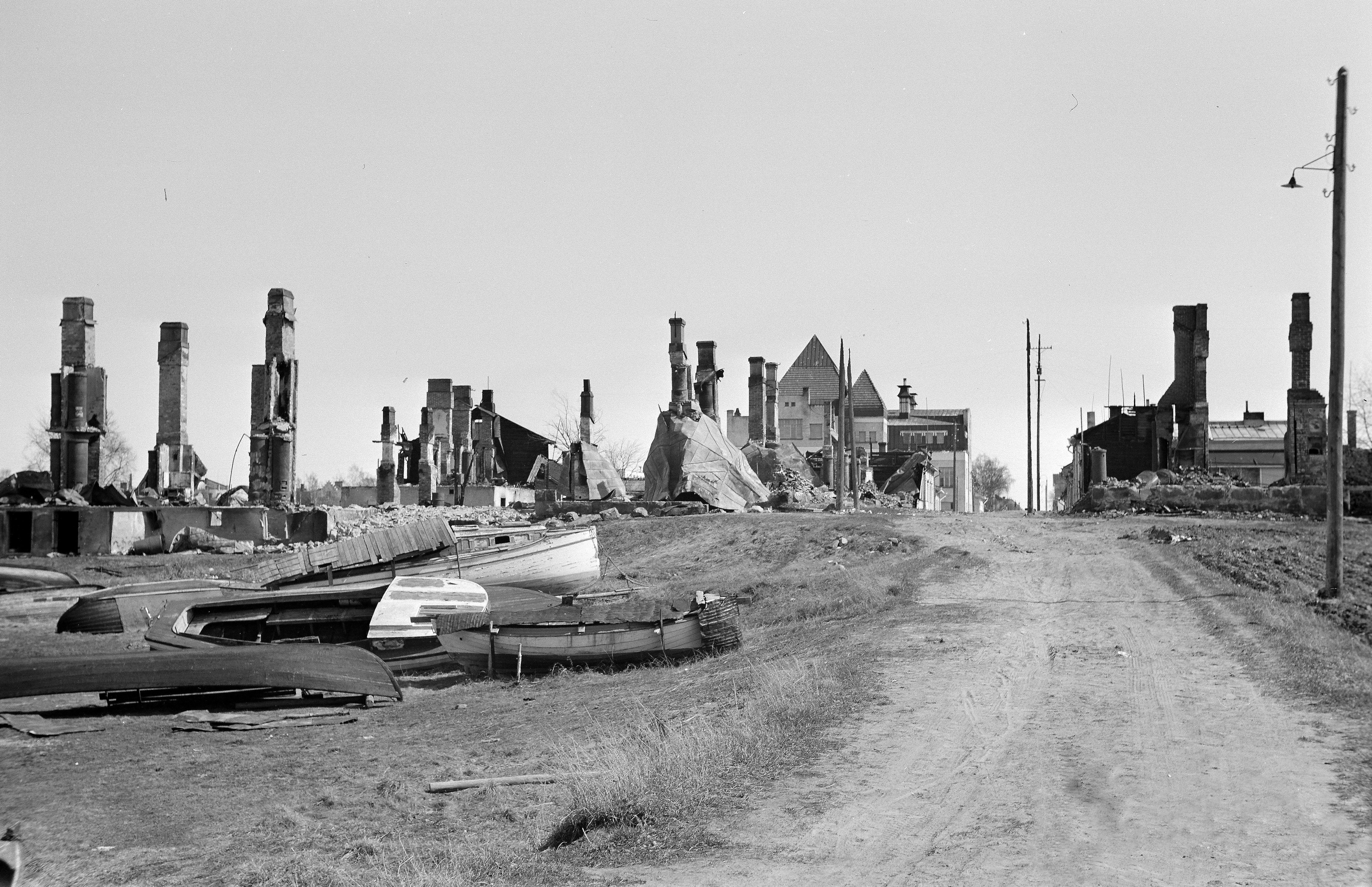
The school has survived the bombings in 1944.

Oulun Suomalainen Yhteiskoulu was established and opened in 1902 as a private Finnish-language lycée. It was the first co-educational upper secondary school in Oulu. At the time Finland was a Grand Duchy of the Russian Empire. The first principal of the school, Mauno Rosendal was an independence activist, who was sent to exile in 1903. He returned from exile in 1905. The first years the school operated in rented premises, the own school building was built in 1907–1908. The school was changed to a state-owned public school in 1920. During the World War II school work was disrupted at times. The military needed premises and the Soviet Union bombed the Kuusiluoto neighbourhood. In 1944 a bomb fell into the girls' gymnasium, but did not explode. In the 1974 national education reform Oulun Suomalainen Yhteiskoulu was turned over to the city government, and at the time it was renamed and divided into the Kuusiluoto secondary school (Kuusiluodon yläaste) and the Kuusiluoto upper secondary school (Kuusiluodon lukio). In 2004 Kuusiluodon lukio was made a central upper secondary school and the lower classes were merged into other schools. The original name of the school was restored in 2006.

== School building ==
The school building of the Oulun Suomalainen Yhteiskoulu was built in 1907-1908 in Art Nouveau style influenced by national romanticism. The four-storey stone building was designed by architect Victor Sucksdorff. The building has been extended in 1955 with an extension that was adapted to the original building and in 1960 with a modern extension. The last major restoration work was completed in the autumn of 2006.
