= Kylmälänkylä =

Village in Muhos, Finland

Coordinates: 64°35′N 26°16′E

Kylmälänkylä is one of the longest villages in Finland, spanning 25 kilometers. It belongs to the municipality of Muhos in the province of Oulun lääni. Kylmälänkylä has an active village association.

The roads in the area are in poor condition due to heavy lumber traffic eroding the roads. The main regional road has received a new pavement since that and is more comfortable to drive but the road has degraded since the fix.

The village has seen some families moving in and new residential houses built.

== Statistics ==
Population: 265 inhabitants, consists of 112 households
Demographics: 54% men, 46% women
Distance from Muhos: 34 kilometers, distance from Oulu: 75 kilometers (about an hour by car)

== Main attractions ==
- Local village grocery store Satumaa (Dreamland) and a mailbox for outgoing mail
- Village Association's kota near the store that can be rented as a venue to host events
