= Kontiomäki railway station =

Railway station in Paltamo, Finland

Coordinates: 64.3373°N 28.1163°E

Kontiomäki
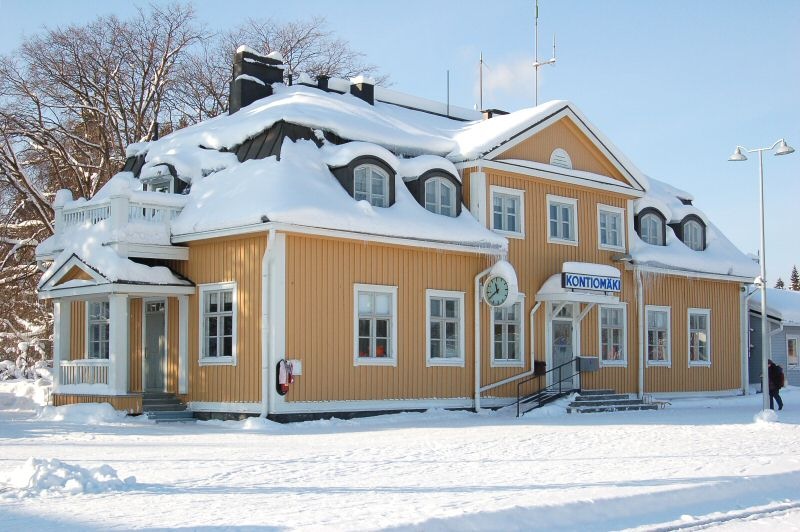
- The station building on winter 2006. The building was destroyed in a fire in 2020.

General information
- Location: Asematie 4, 88470 Kontiomäki
- System: VR station
- Owner: Finnish Transport Agency
- Platforms: 3
- Tracks: 13

Construction
- Structure type: Ground station
- Architect: Gunnar Aspelin; Jarl Ungern

Other information
- Status: Destroyed in the 2020 fire.

History
- Opened: 1923
Location

Kontiomäki railway station (Finnish: Kontiomäen rautatieasema) is located in the village of Kontiomäki in Paltamo, Finland. It is a junction station on the Iisalmi–Kontiomäki, Kontiomäki–Oulu, Joensuu–Kontiomäki, Kontiomäki–Vartius and Kontiomäki–Ämmänsaari railway lines and was opened in 1923.

The Finnish Heritage Agency has classified Kontiomäki railway station as a nationally significant built cultural environment.

== History ==
Kontiomäki railway station was one of the few railway stations in Finland originally planned as a junction station from the very beginning. In September 1918 the decision to begin the planning of a railway line from Nurmes to Oulu and from Kajaani to Mieslahti was made. Later in November the plans for the railway line from Kajaani to Mieslahti were completed and temporary traffic between Kajaani and Kontiomäki began in January 1923. The wooden station building designed by architects Gunnar Aspelin and Jarl Ungern and representing Nordic Classicism with a gambrel roof was completed in the same year. The railway line from Nurmes to Oulu was fully completed in 1929.

The construction of the Kontiomäki–Ämmänsaari railway line (previously known as the Taivalkoski-Ämmänsaari line) began in September 1934 and the railyard of Kontiomäki station was expanded at the same time. A railway line from Kontiomäki to Vartius and further to Kostomuksha, Russia was built in 1974–1976, solely for freight traffic.

Out of these railway lines, four of them have had regular passenger traffic from Kontiomäki railway station. Passenger traffic towards Taivalkoski via the Kontiomäki–Ämmänsaari line ceased in 1982, although there was a short-term experiment with seasonal "ski trains" under the title Winter Rail done in 1988–1990. Passenger traffic towards Nurmes ceased in 1993. The ticket sales office at Kontiomäki was closed in 2001 but the station remained staffed after that. In 1989–2002, the station was also served by motorail.

The station building from 1923 was destroyed in a fire on May 6, 2020.

== Services ==
Kontiomäki is served by all of the long-distance train services that travel between Kajaani and Oulu. The railway lines to Joensuu, Vartius and Ämmänsaari are only used by freight trains.

== Departure tracks ==
Kontiomäki railway station has three platform tracks. All passenger trains that stop at the station currently use track 1.
