= Kokkola railway station =

Railway station in Kokkola, Finland

Kokkola Karleby
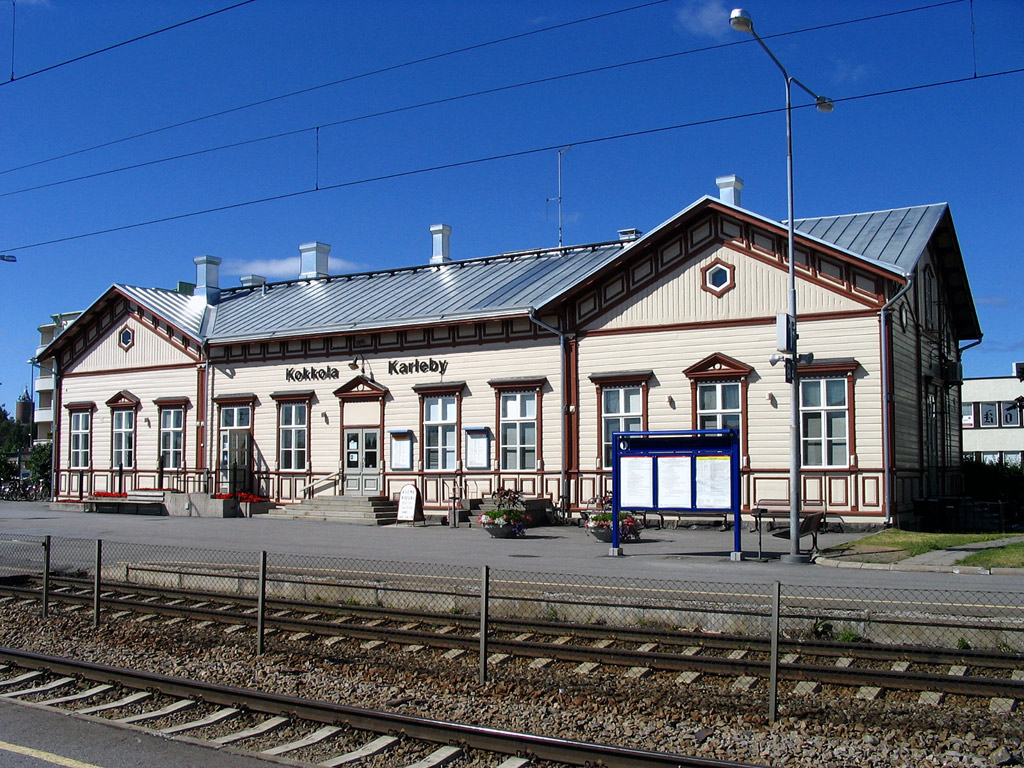

General information
- Location: Rautatienkatu 1, 67100 Kokkola
- Coordinates: 63°50′05″N 023°07′53″E
- System: VR station
- Owner: Finnish Transport Agency
- Platforms: 3

Construction
- Structure type: ground station

History
- Opened: 1885

Passengers
- 2005: 2,200 daily
Location

Kokkola railway station (Finnish: Kokkolan rautatieasema, Swedish: Karleby järnvägsstation) is located in the town of Kokkola, Central Ostrobothnia, Finland. The railway to Kokkola was completed in 1885 and further to Oulu in 1886. Seinäjoki railway station is located 133 kilometres (83 mi) away from Kokkola. The railway station building is a station built according to the type drawings of the so-called "railway stations of the Oulu railway", designed by Knut Nylander.

The Chydenia Shopping Center is located about 100 meters north of the railway station.

== Services ==
Kokkola is served by all passenger trains that run between Helsinki and Oulu.

== Departure tracks ==
Kokkola railway station as three platform tracks.

- Track 1 is used by all of the daytime passenger train services both towards Helsinki and Oulu.
- Track 2 is used by southbound night train services from Lapland to Helsinki.
- Track 3 is used by northbound night train services to Lapland (Kolari, Kemijärvi, Rovaniemi).

== Gallery ==
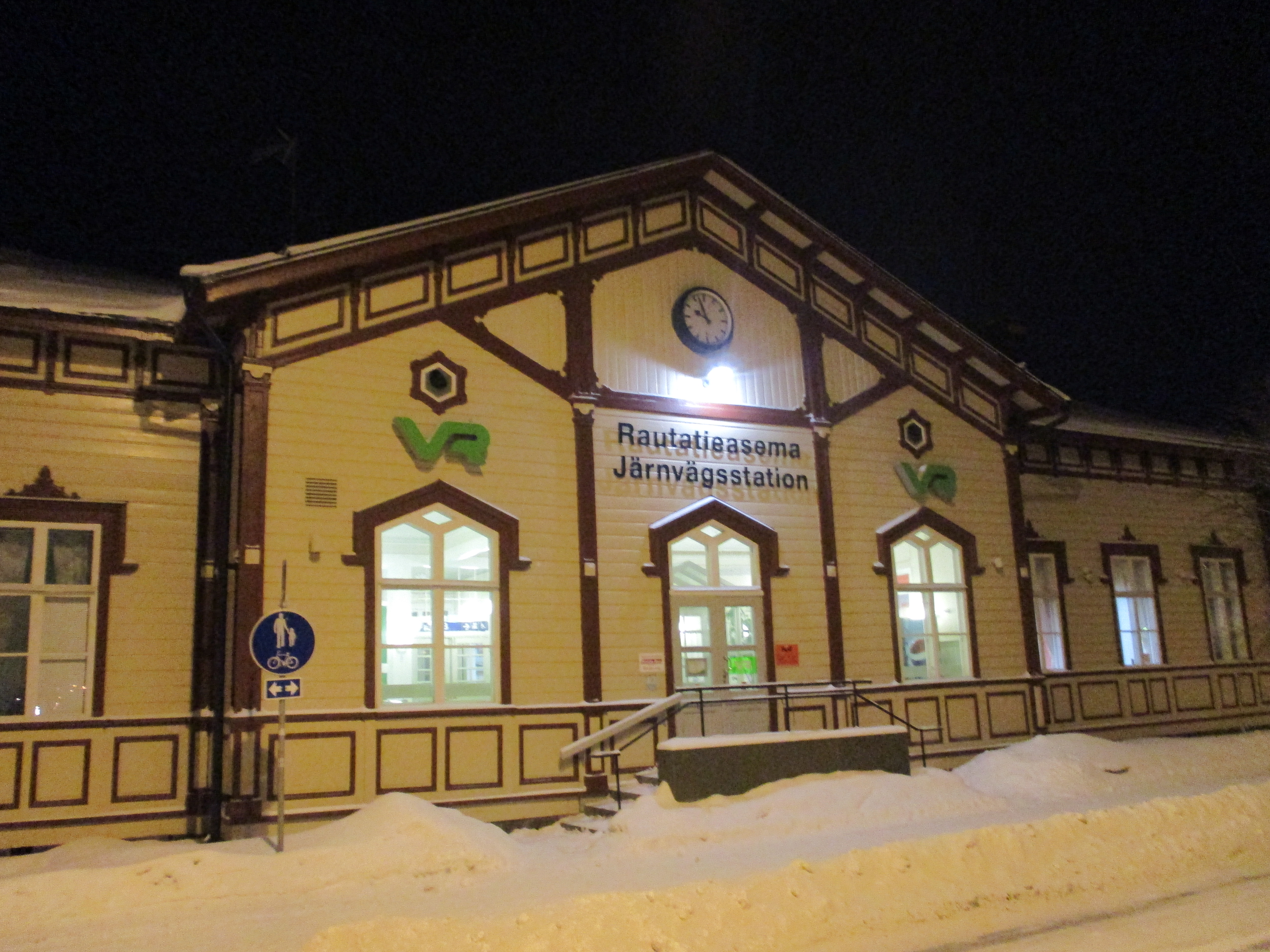
The entrance of the station building at night

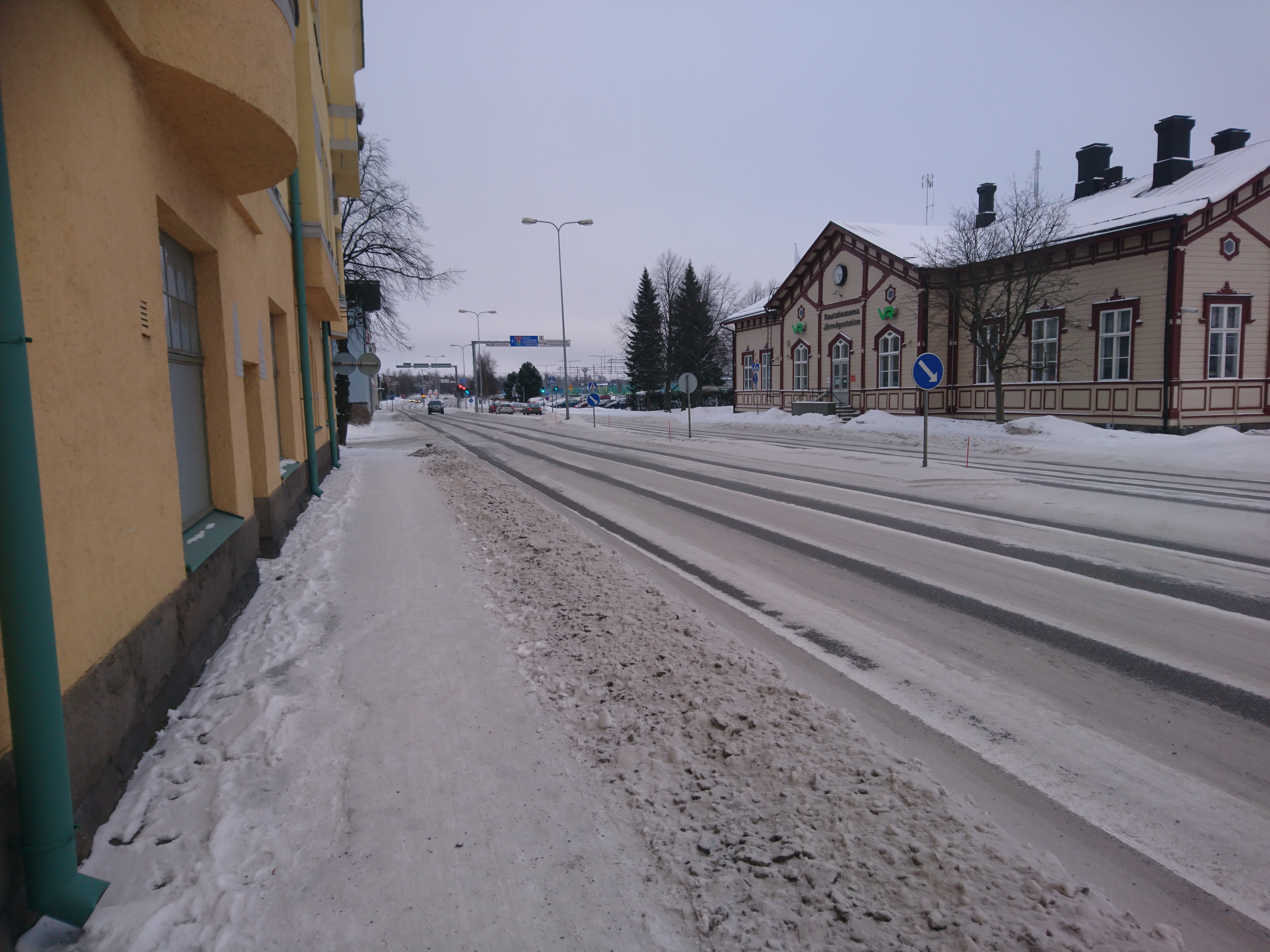
The Rautatienkatu street near the railway station

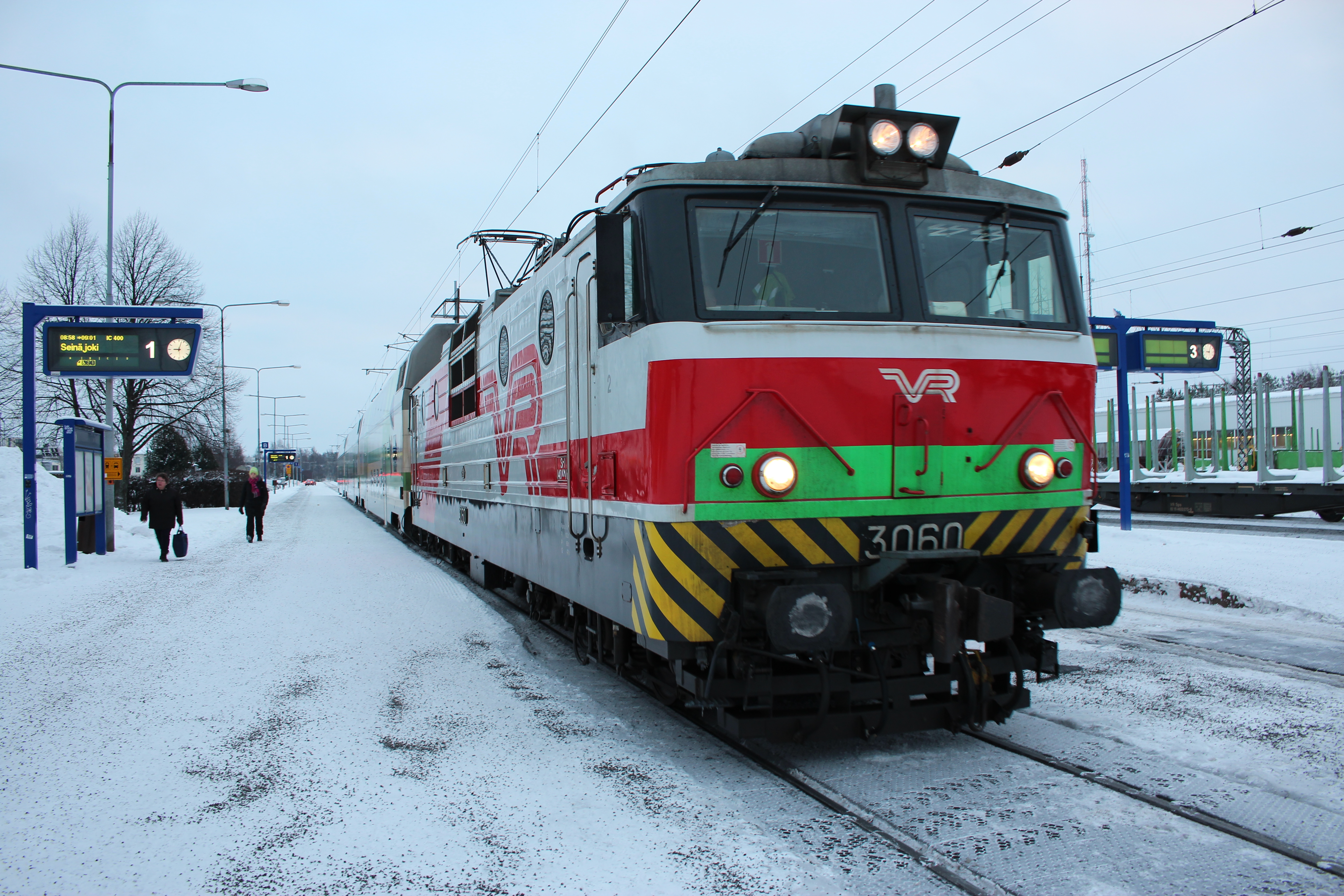
VR Class Sr1 train at the railway station

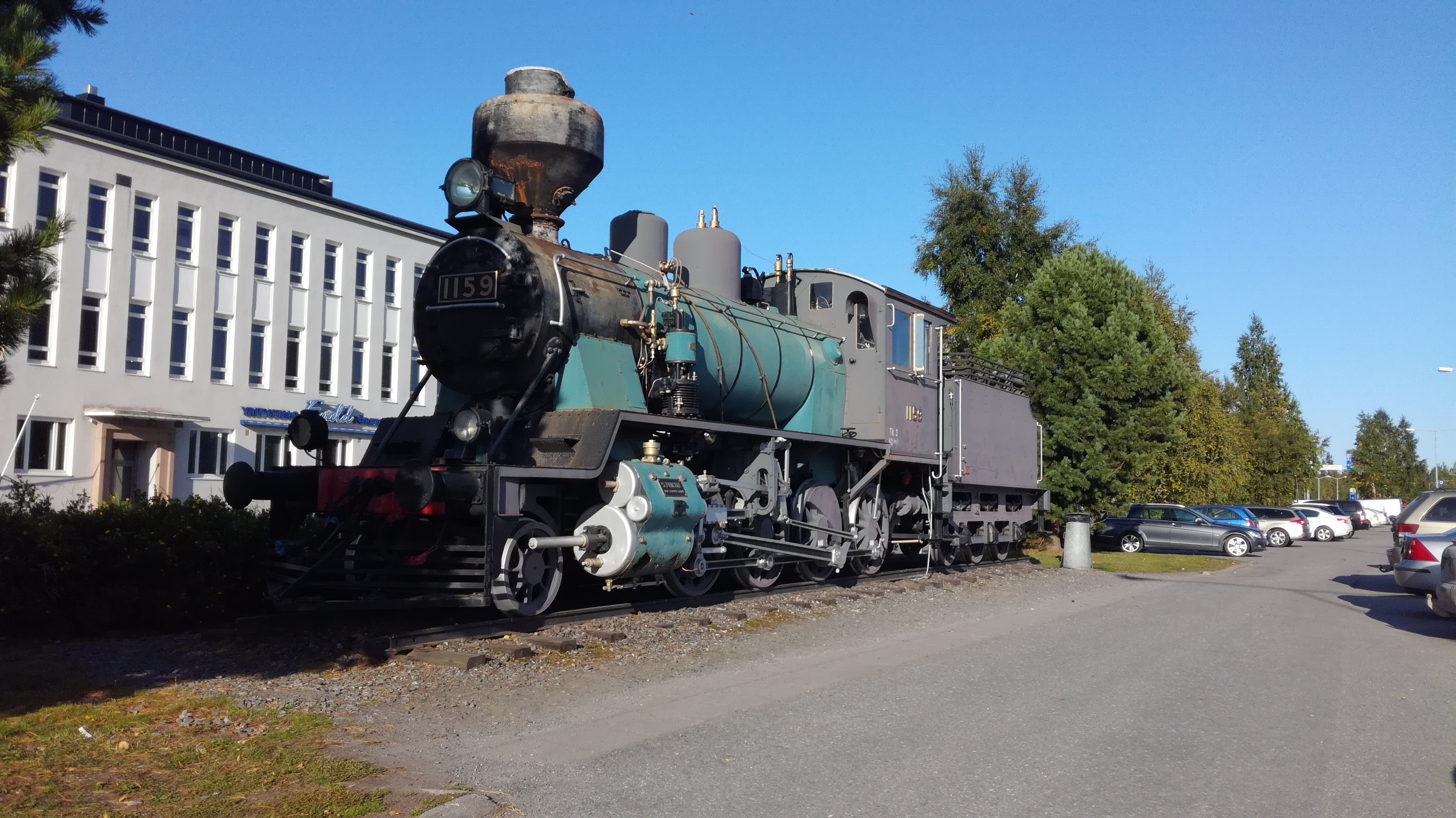
Steam locomotive VR Class Tk3 1105 near the railway station

== See also ==
- Jakobstad-Pedersöre railway station
- Oulu railway station
