= Vaara =

Coordinates: 65.0105°N 25.4828°E

- District of Oulu
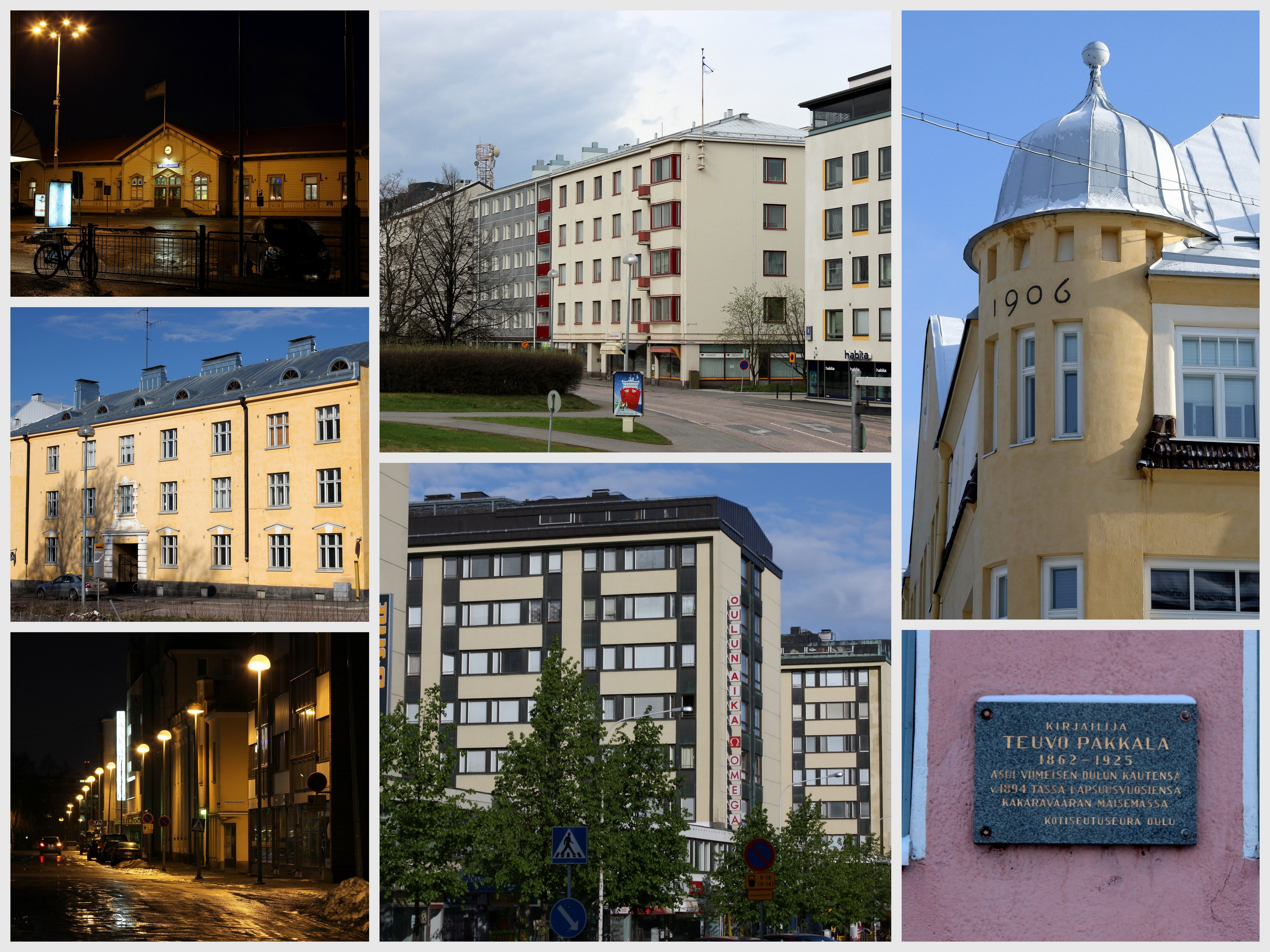
- Interactive map of Vaara
- Country: Finland
- City: Oulu
- Areas of Oulu: City Centre

Population (2013)
  - Total: 2 332
- Postal code: 90100

Vaara is a district of the city centre area of Oulu, Finland. Together with the districts of Pokkinen and Vanhatulli, Vaara forms the central business district of Oulu. It is bounded by the districts of Raksila to the east, Pokkinen to the west, Myllytulli to the north and Vanhatulli to the south.

Both Oulu railway station and Oulu bus station are located in Vaara.
