= Oulu Bus Station =

Bus station in Oulu, Finland

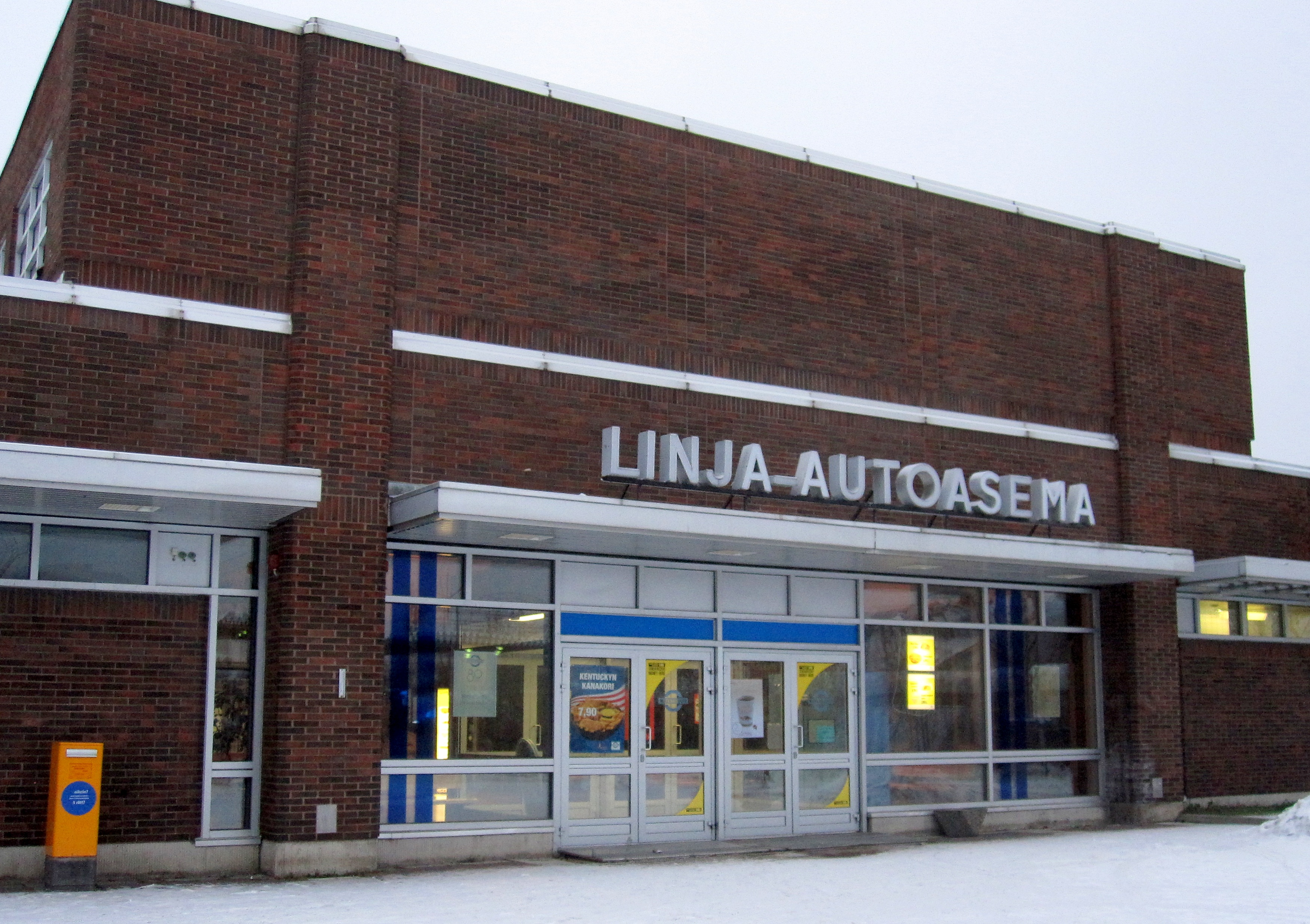

General information
- Location: Vaara, Oulu; Finland
- Coordinates: 65.00992469305005°N 25.484545789603782°E
- System: Bus station
- Lines: Central & A+B Zone
- Connections: Train: Oulu railway station
Location

The Oulu Bus Station (Finnish: Oulun linja-autoasema) was a bus station in the city center of Oulu, Finland, located in the Vaara district, near the Raksila district and Oulu railway station.

A bus station was originally built in Torinranta on the site of the current Autoranta parking area in 1937. The Oulu City Council decided to build a new station as early as 1963, but the bus station was only opened in November 1983. By the early 2020s, the building had deteriorated beyond repair, and demolition started in September 2025 to make way for a new station.

Martti Aiha's sculpture Futura – Tuntematon was located next to the bus station building until it was removed in 2023.
