= Muhos =

- Municipality
- Muhoksen kunta Muhos kommun
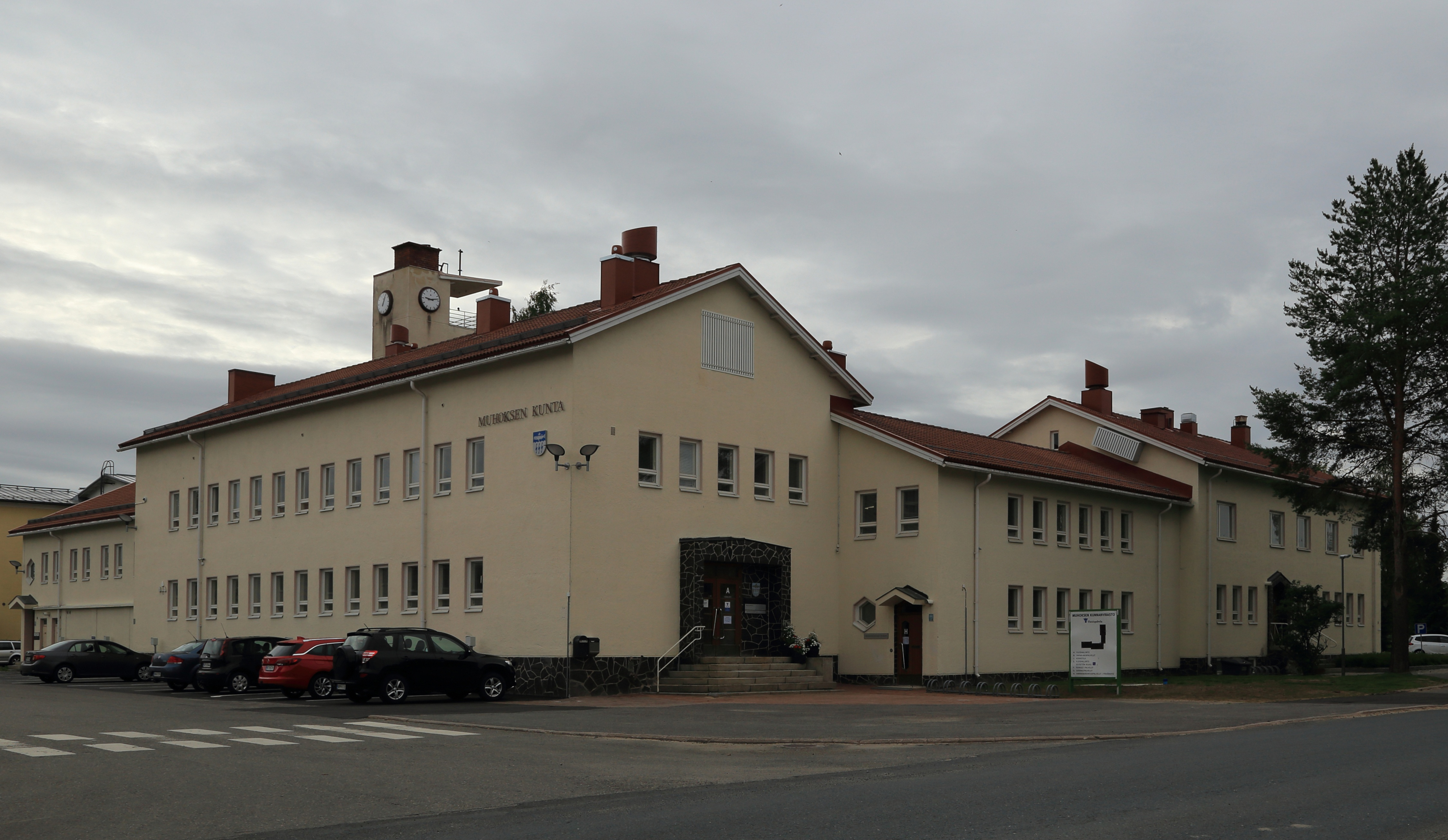
- Muhos Town Hall

- Coat of arms

- Location of Muhos in Finland
- Interactive map of Muhos
- Coordinates: 64°48′N 026°00′E
- Country: Finland
- Region: North Ostrobothnia
- Sub-region: Oulu
- Charter: 1865

Government
  - Municipal manager: Kimmo Hinno

Area (2018-01-01)
  - Total: 797.26 km^{2} (307.82 sq mi)
  - Land: 784.59 km^{2} (302.93 sq mi)
  - Water: 13.78 km^{2} (5.32 sq mi)
  - Rank: 106th largest in Finland

Population (2025-12-31)
  - Total: 8,767
  - Rank: 113th largest in Finland
  - Density: 11.17/km^{2} (28.9/sq mi)

Population by native language
  - Finnish: 98.4% (official)
  - Others: 1.6%

Population by age
  - 0 to 14: 23.3%
  - 15 to 64: 58.3%
  - 65 or older: 18.4%
- Time zone: UTC+02:00 (EET)
  - Summer (DST): UTC+03:00 (EEST)
- Website: muhos.fi

Muhos is a municipality of northern Finland. It is located in the province of Oulu half an hour's drive (35 km) on route 22 from the city of Oulu, the capital of Northern Finland, and is part of the Northern Ostrobothnia region. The municipality has a population of 8,767 (31 December 2025) and covers an area of 797.26 square kilometres (307.82 sq mi) of which 13.78 km^{2} (5.32 sq mi) is water. The population density is 11.17 inhabitants per square kilometre (28.9/sq mi).

The river Oulujoki flows through the town and its countryside, with the wide open plains of Ostrobothnia on the south side of the river and the forested hills of Kainuu on the northern side. Located in Muhos is the Pyhäkoski hydro-electric power plant which was commissioned in 1949 and has the highest fall in Finland (32.4 m). The power station has been designed by renowned Finnish architect Aarne Ervi. The motif of the municipal coat of arms, designed by Olof Eriksson and adopted in the 1950s, also alludes to electricity generation following the construction of the power plant.

Google is planning a data center to be located in Muhos.

== Culture ==
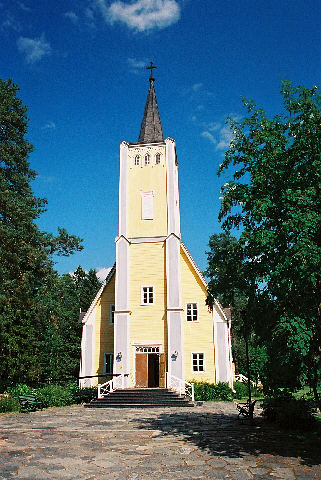
Muhos Church, built in 1634, is the oldest wooden church in Finland still in year-round use.

The town has a culture centre which consists of the town library and space for various cultural activities, which can be rented for a nominal fee. The culture centre also has a movie theater.

== Languages ==
The municipality is unilingually Finnish.

== Transport ==
=== Road ===
The Finnish national road 22 between Oulu and Kajaani passes through the municipal center. There are several daily local bus connections to Oulu, and several long-distance connections to Kajaani and points east.

=== Rail ===
Oulu–Kontiomäki railway line runs through the municipal center. There are eight daily passenger trains, four each way, serving the community at Muhos railway station. The trains are operated by the national railway operator, VR Group.

=== Air ===
The closest commercial airport is Oulu Airport in Oulunsalo, 50 kilometres (30 mi) west.

== Education ==
Schools in Muhos:

- Muhos Upper secondary school
- Muhos Highschool (about 400 pupils )
- Muhos Elementary school (about 180 pupils)
- Korivaara Elementary school
- Huovila Elementary school
- Honkala Elementary school
- Hyrkki Elementary school
- Laitasaari Elementary school

== Notable persons ==
=== Miss Universe ===
Armi Kuusela, Miss Universe 1952 was born, raised and lived in Muhos. Muhos county has a village named Kylmälänkylä, which is thought to be the longest village in Finland.

=== Parliamentarians ===
The members of the parliament elected from Muhos have been Pirkko Mattila (True Finns 2011-), Ester Häikiö (Finnish People's Democratic League 1951-1954) and Aaro Kauppi (Agrarian League 1951–1954, 1956–1958 and 1963–1966, renamed as Centre Party 1965-1966) and Yrjö Kesti (Small Farmers' Party of Finland 1930–1936). Juhana Petter Valkola was a peasant deputy during the diet session 1877–1878.

During the Great Depression of the 1930s Muhos was one of the municipalities where the deficiency movements (pulaliikkeet, singular pulaliike) started to organise as critique to the cabinet parties. After the municipal elections of the year 1933, the biggest political group in the municipal council of Muhos was Muhoksen pulatoimikunta which was an elemental part of the movement in the southern regions of Oulu. In 1933 they had seven members of the council. In the northern Finland as the deficit movement was based on the small peasants' and was a critique for the Agrarian League and Kyösti Kallio, but in some cases it was a critique to the Social Democratic Party of Finland as well. Some parts of the deficiency movement was financed moderately by the Communist Party of Finland as its activities were forbidden by law in (1930–1944) to the end of the Continuation War. In the 1930s the Communistic movement of Finland tried to go on its work in the Social Democratic organisations, which were not banned in Finland and less also in the deficiency movement.

The deficiency movements demanded the state take more effective measures to help the small peasants to avoid the compulsory auctions of the debt-driven small farms. Many of the farmsteads were bought in the auctions by the state and later returned to their former owners.
