= Marjatta Jaatinen =

Finnish architect (1927–2003)

Marjatta Jatinen
- Born: 21 December 1927; Vyborg, Finland
- Died: 29 October 2003 (aged 75); Helsinki
- Occupation: Architect

Marjatta Jatinen (21 December 1927 in Vyborg – 29 October 2003 in Helsinki) was a Finnish architect.

== Works ==
Together with her husband Martti Jaatinen, she designed an administrative and cultural center for Oulu, Helsinki's Kannelmäki church, a tent-like structure that deviates from traditional church architecture, Kupitta sports hall in Turku, and Tampere Workers' Theatre.

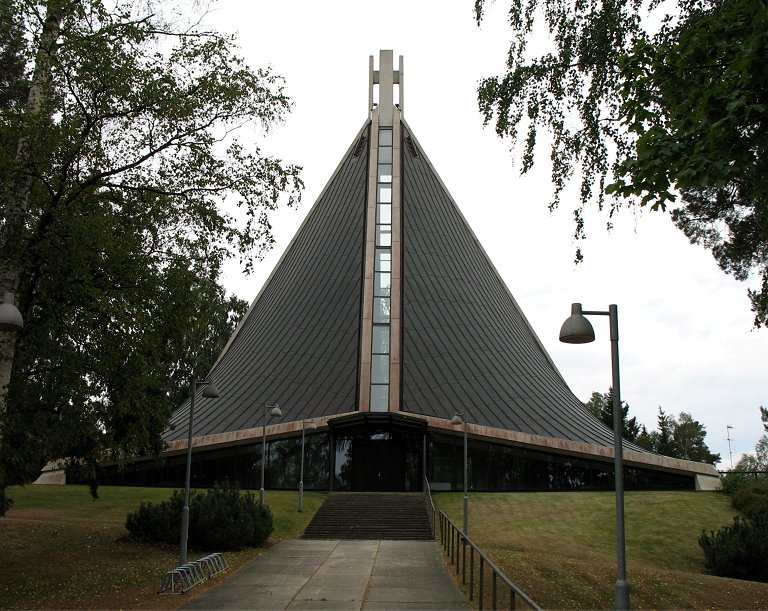
Kannelmäki church

=== Buildings designed by Marjatta and Martti Jaatinen ===
- Oulu City Theatre (1972)
- Oulu City Library (1981)
