= Martti Jaatinen =

Finnish architect (1928–2008)

- Born: 25 July 1928; Sortavala, Finland
- Died: 19 February 2008 (aged 79); Espoo
- Education: Helsinki University of Technology
- Occupation: Architect
- Spouse: Marjatta Jaatinen

Martti Jaatinen (25 July 1928 – 19 February 2008) was a Finnish architect.

== Life and work ==
Martti Jaatinen was born in Sortavala. His family settled in Oulu after the war. In 1954, he graduated as an architect from the Helsinki University of Technology. During his studies, he had already worked in the office of Viljo Revell. From 1958 to 1965 he worked at the Museum of Finnish Architecture. From 1967 to 1991 he was professor of architecture at the Helsinki University of Technology. Together with his wife Marjatta Jaatinen, he designed the urban plan for the center of Oulu and many buildings. Their common designs are different from traditional architecture and have their own characteristics. He died in Espoo.

== Buildings designed by Marjatta and Martti Jaatinen ==
- Oulu City Theatre (1972)
- Hotel Korpilampi (1977)
- Oulu City Library(1981)
