= Oulu railway station =

Railway station in Oulu, Finland

Oulu Uleåborg
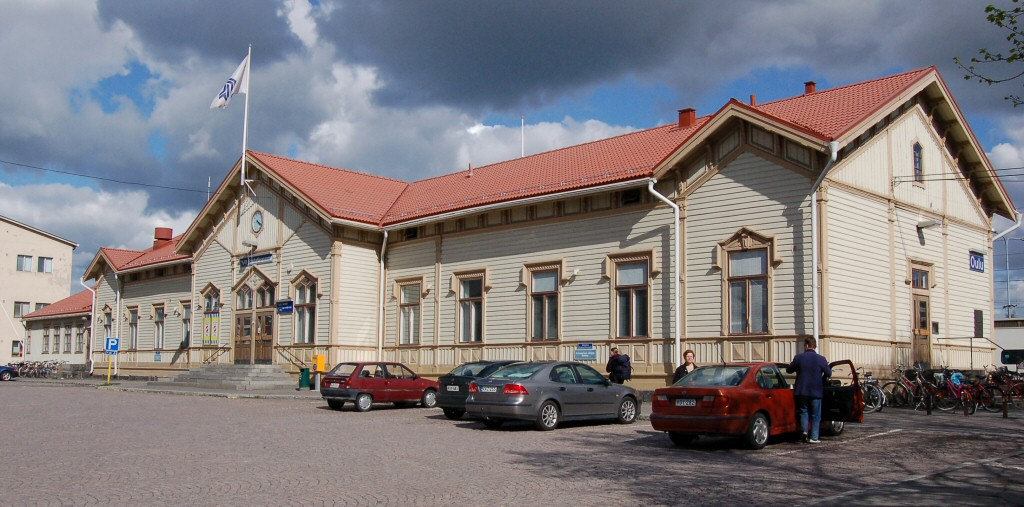

General information
- Location: Rautatienkatu 11A, 90100 Oulu
- Coordinates: 65°00′41″N 025°29′02″E
- System: VR Group station
- Owner: Finnish Transport Agency
- Platforms: 3
- Tracks: 7

Construction
- Structure type: ground station

History
- Opened: 1886

Passengers
- 863 600 (2010)

Services
Preceding station	VR Group	Following station
Kempele towards Seinäjoki	Seinäjoki–Oulu	Terminus
Terminus	Oulu–Kontiomäki	Muhos towards Kontiomäki
Terminus	Oulu–Tornio	Kemi towards Tornio
Kempele towards Helsinki	Helsinki–Kolari (overnight service)	Kemi towards Kolari
Former services
Preceding station	Finnish State Railways	Following station
Ylivieska towards Helsinki	Polaria	Terminus
Vihanti towards Helsinki	Lapponia	Terminus
Location

The Oulu Railway Station is located in the centre of Oulu, Finland, in the city district of Vaara. All trains are operated by VR. Nearby is the Oulu bus station for long-distance buses.

The railway station was built in 1886 when the Ostrobothnia railway line reached Oulu.

The railway from the south to Oulu was electrified in 1983, using overhead electric wires at 25 kV. The electrification northwards from Oulu to Rovaniemi was not completed until 2004. In 2006 the railway from Oulu to Iisalmi was also electrified. The fastest trains from Oulu to Helsinki are operated by VR's Pendolino trains.

== Departure tracks ==
There are seven tracks at Oulu railway station out of which three have a platform for passenger trains.

- Track 1 is used by the majority of the daytime passenger trains headed to Helsinki (either via Seinäjoki or Kuopio) and Rovaniemi.
- Track 2 is used by a couple of services to Rovaniemi.
- Track 3 is used by night train services both towards Helsinki and north to Kolari, Kemijärvi and Rovaniemi. The track is also used by a couple of trains towards Kuopio.

== Gallery ==
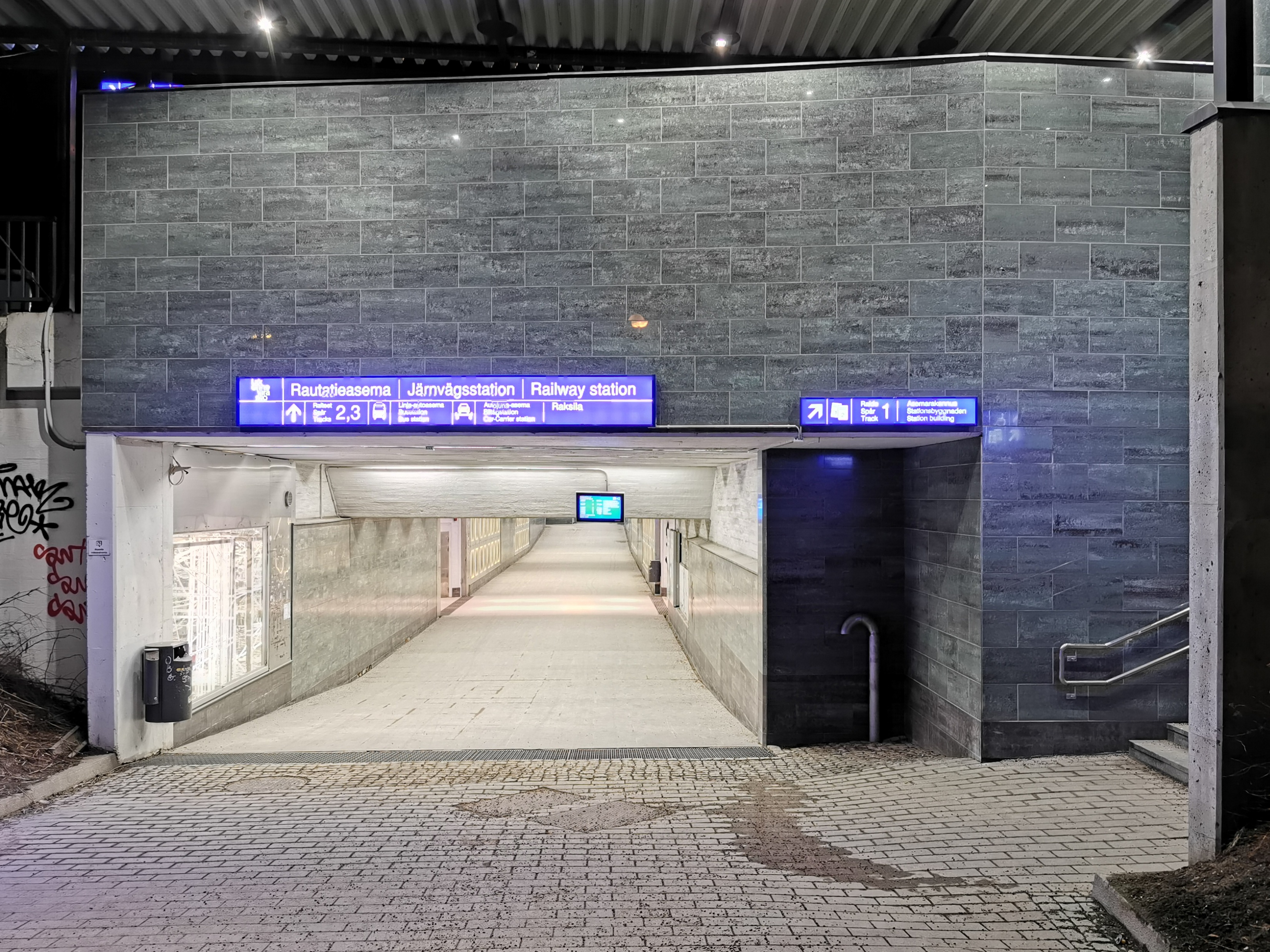
Station tunnel

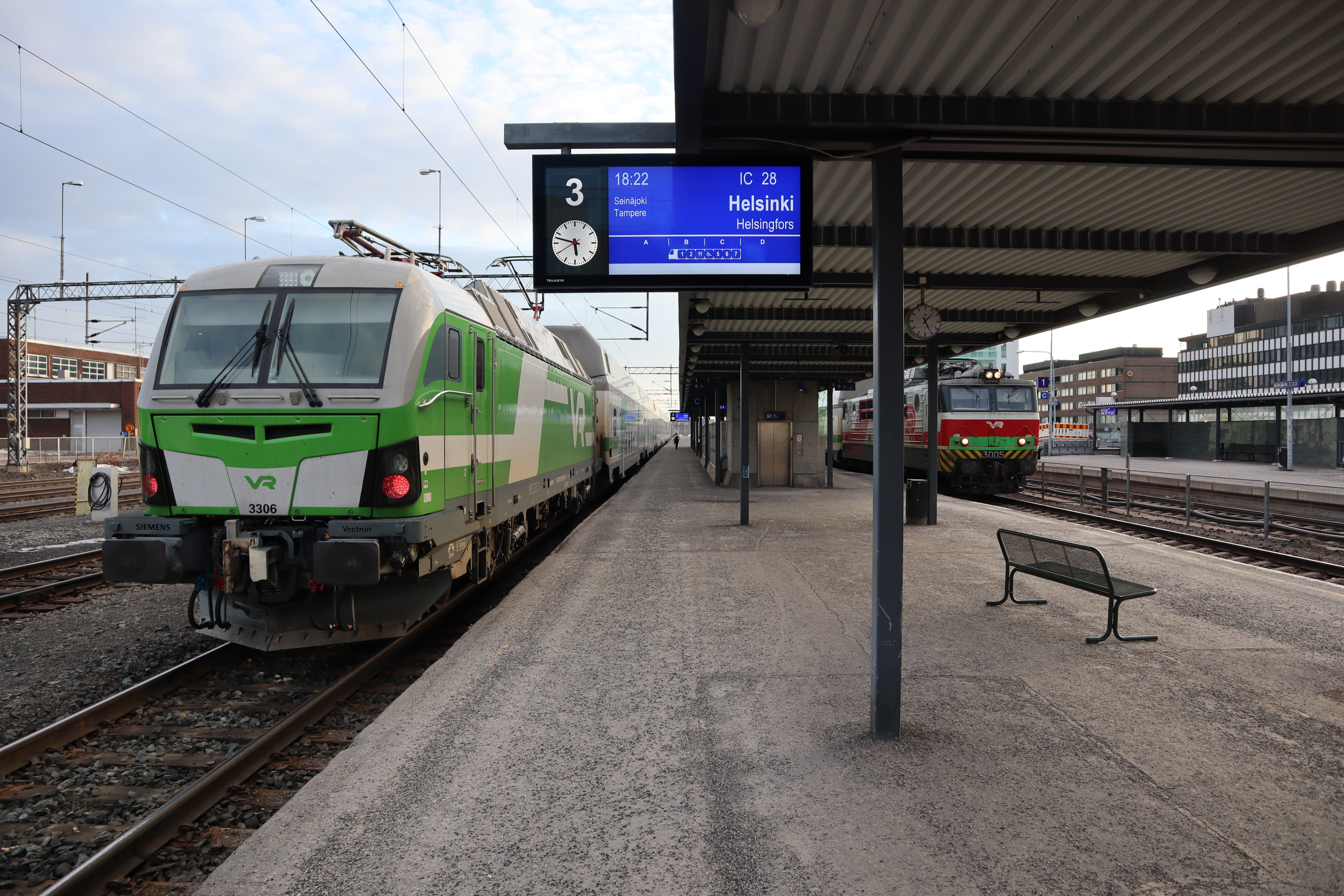
Platforms 2 and 3

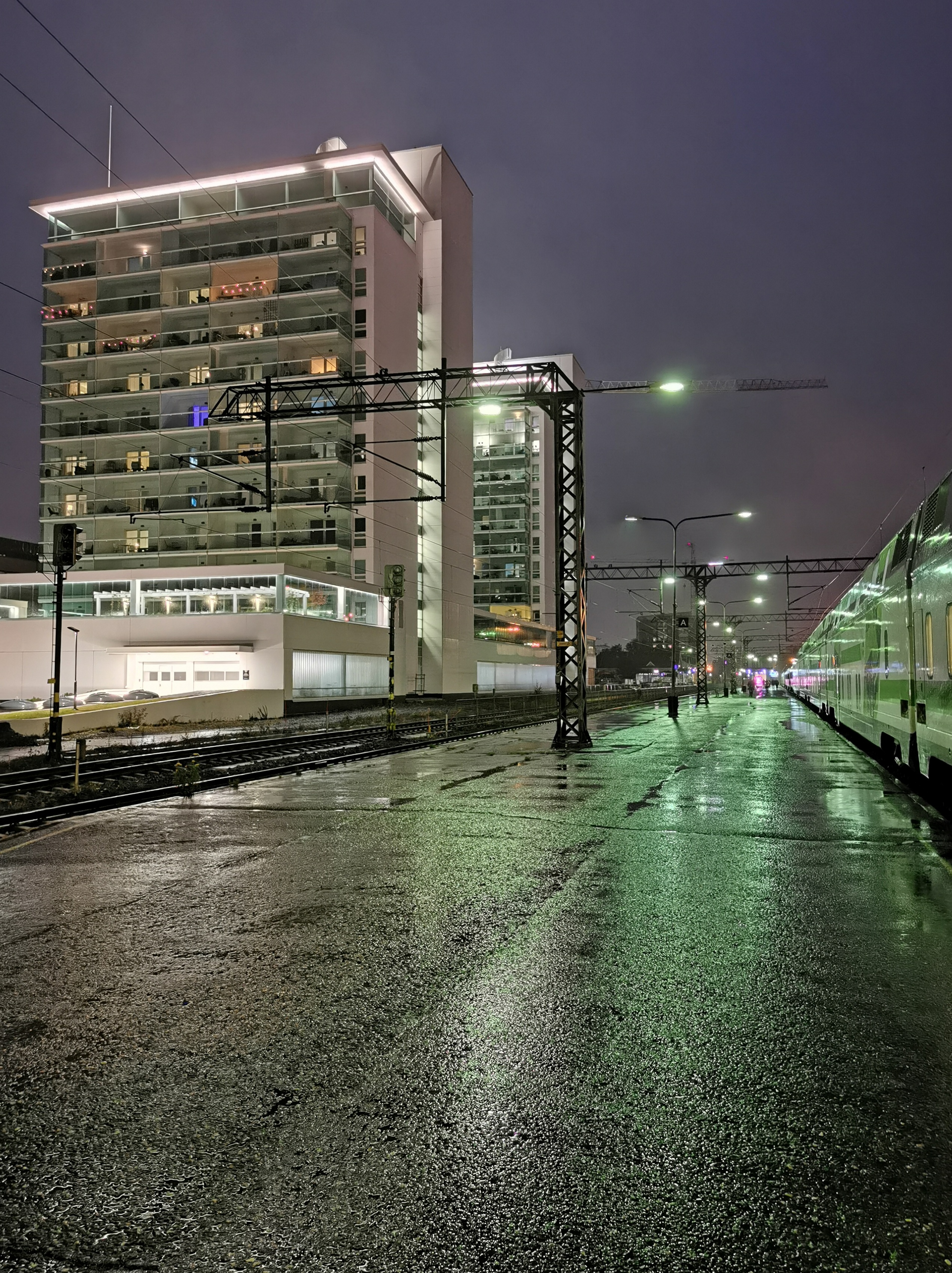
Station platform and tower blocks

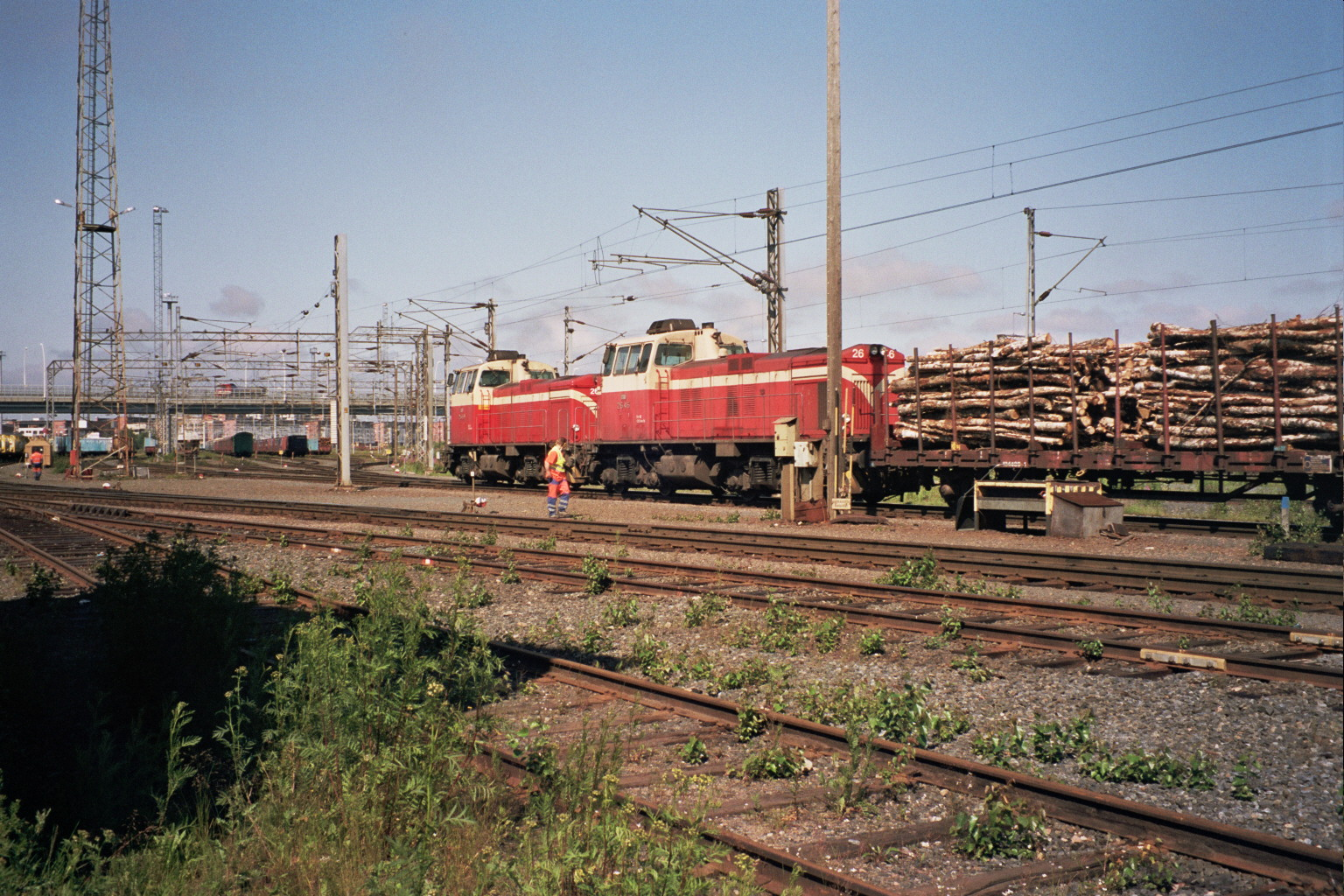
Two diesel locomotives (class Dv12) transporting wood at the Oulu train station freight yard.

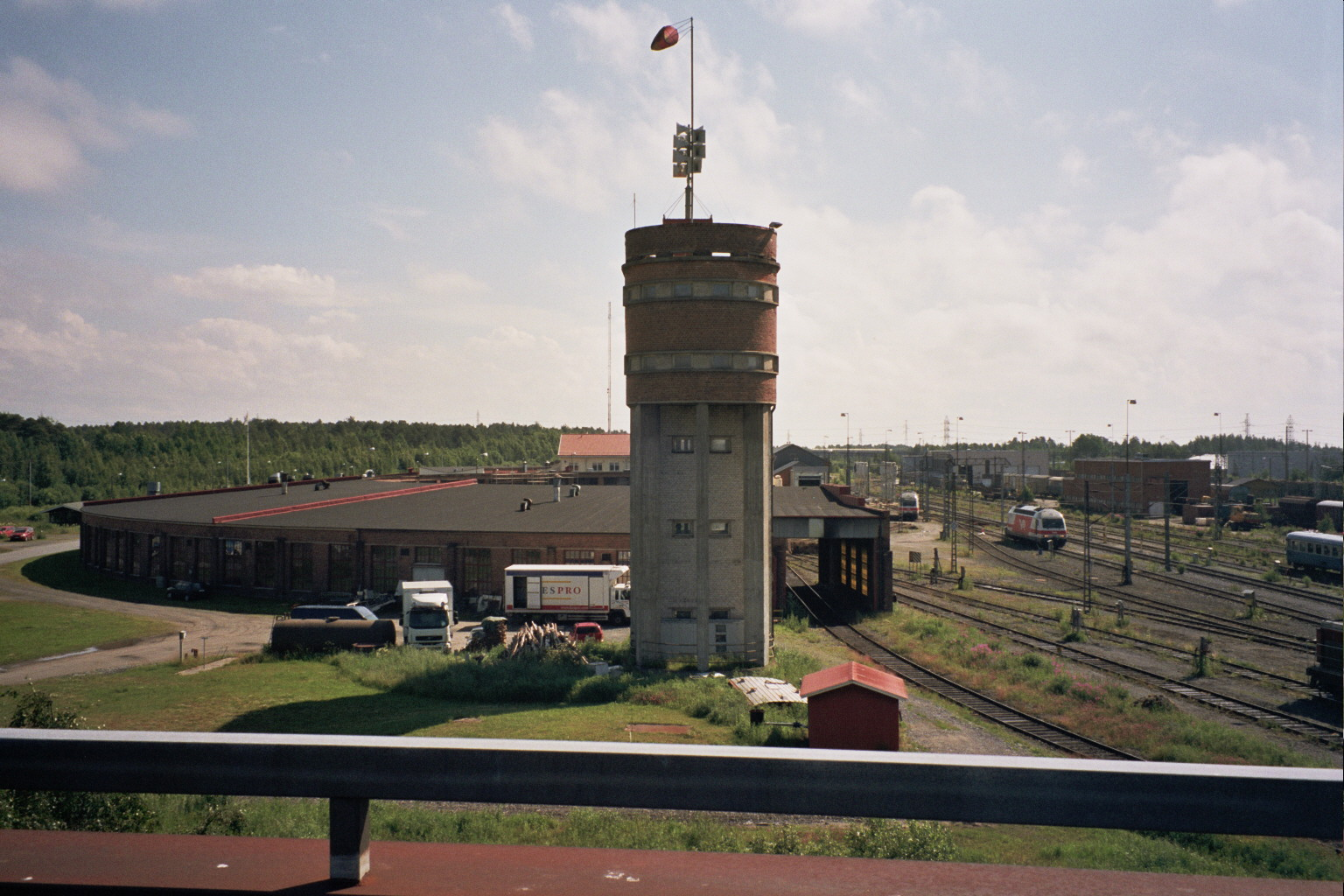
The VR locomotive stable at the rail yard in Oulu.

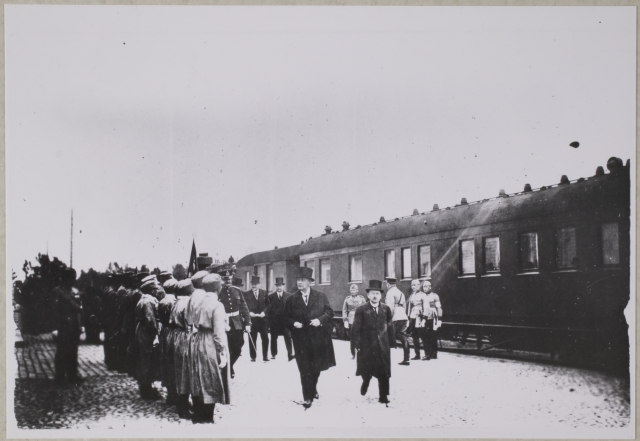
President L. K. Relander and governor E. Y. Pehkonen (president is the man in the middle with a top hat, governor on his left side also with a top hat) at the Oulu railway station on June 29, 1928.
