= Kempele railway station =

Railway station in Kempele, Finland

Kempele
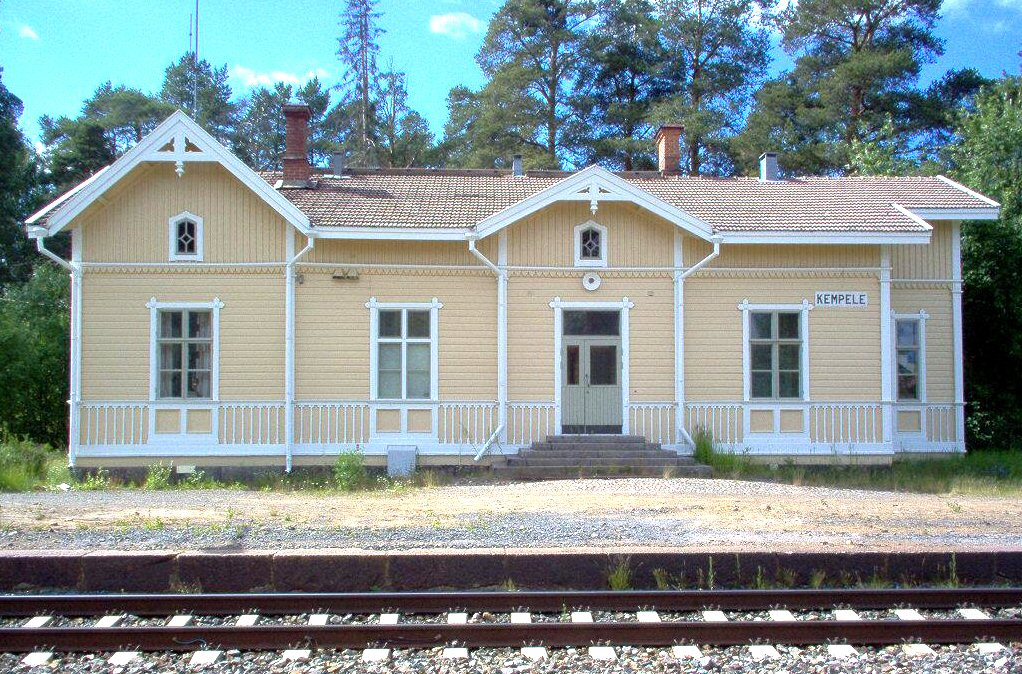

General information
- Location: Rautiontie 27, 90440 Kempele; Finland
- Coordinates: 64°54′46″N 025°30′50″E
- Operator: VR
- Line: Seinäjoki–Oulu railway
- Platforms: 1
- Tracks: 4

Construction
- Structure type: Ground
- Parking: yes

Other information
- Station code: Kml

History
- Opened: 1886
- Closed: 1990
- Rebuilt: 2016
- Electrified: 1983
Location

Kempele is a railway station in the municipality of Kempele, near Oulu, Finland. It was opened in 1886 together with the railway to Oulu. The station building, designed by a Finnish architect Knut Nylander was built in 1884 and later expanded in 1904. The track was electrified in 1983, but the station closed on May 27, 1990.

On September 26, 2013, the Finnish Transport Agency and the municipality of Kempele signed a contract to build a new platform and reopen the station. The platform was built in 2015 and services resumed in 2016.
