= Vihanti railway station =

Railway station in Vihanti, Finland

Vihanti
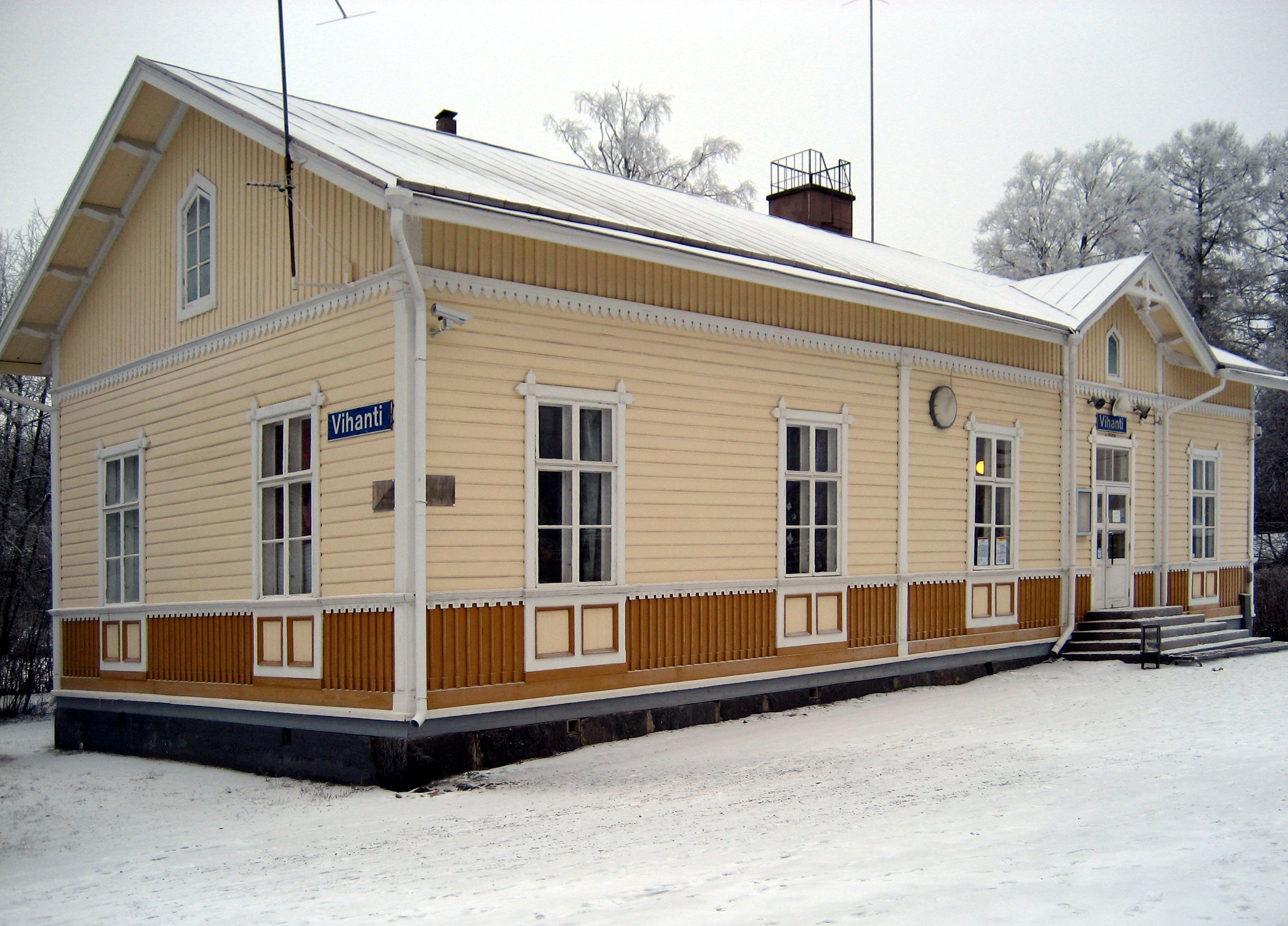

General information
- Coordinates: 64°29′4.5″N 24°59′35″E
- System: VR railway station
- Owner: Finnish Transport Agency
- Platforms: 2

Construction
- Structure type: Ground station

History
- Opened: 1886
Location

Vihanti railway station is located in the town of Vihanti, Northern Ostrobothnia, Finland. The station opened as a part of the Seinäjoki–Oulu railway in 1886, and the station building was expanded in 1925. It handled 51,000 passengers in 2008.
