= Vartius =

Finland–Russia border crossing

- Location in Finland

Location
- Country: Finland
- Location: Kuhmo
- Coordinates: 64°32.701′N 029°59.085′E

Details
- Hours: 7:00–21:00; 07:30–21:30

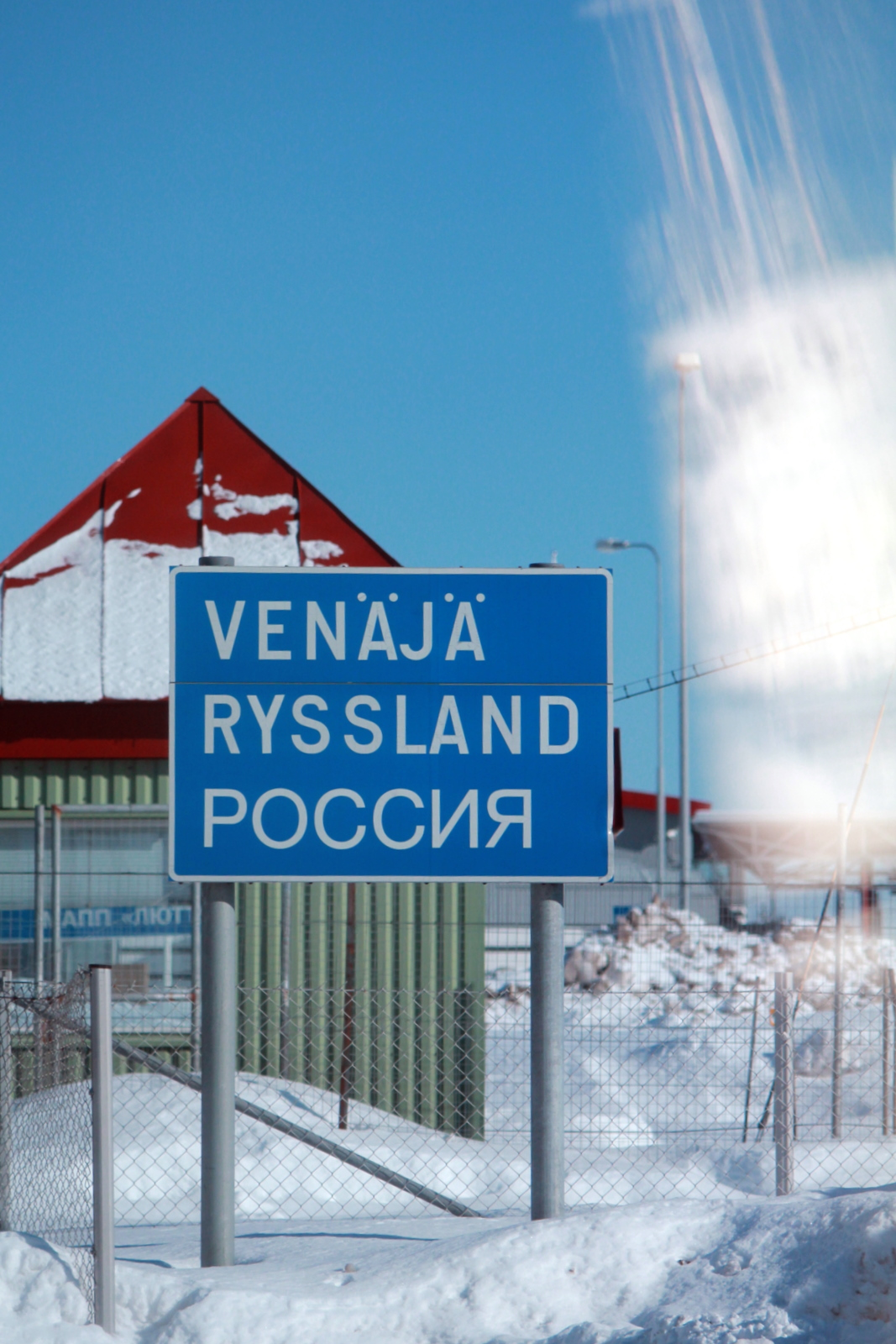
Vartius border crossing point in Kuhmo, Finland

Vartius, located in Kuhmo, Finland, is a border crossing station on the Finnish side of the Finnish–Russian border. The Russian side of the crossing is called Lyttä. Vartius includes both road and rail crossing points.

== Village ==
The border station is named after the village of Vartius slightly further south on the shore of the Vartiusjärvi. It can be accessed via the national road 89 through branch 9123.

The toponym was first mentioned in 1650 as Vartios Jerfui, referring to the lake. The name is likely derived from the word vartio (guard), referring to 16th century land disputes between Ostrobothnians and Karelians in the area.
