= Pokkinen =

Coordinates: 65.0131°N 25.4714°E

- District of Oulu
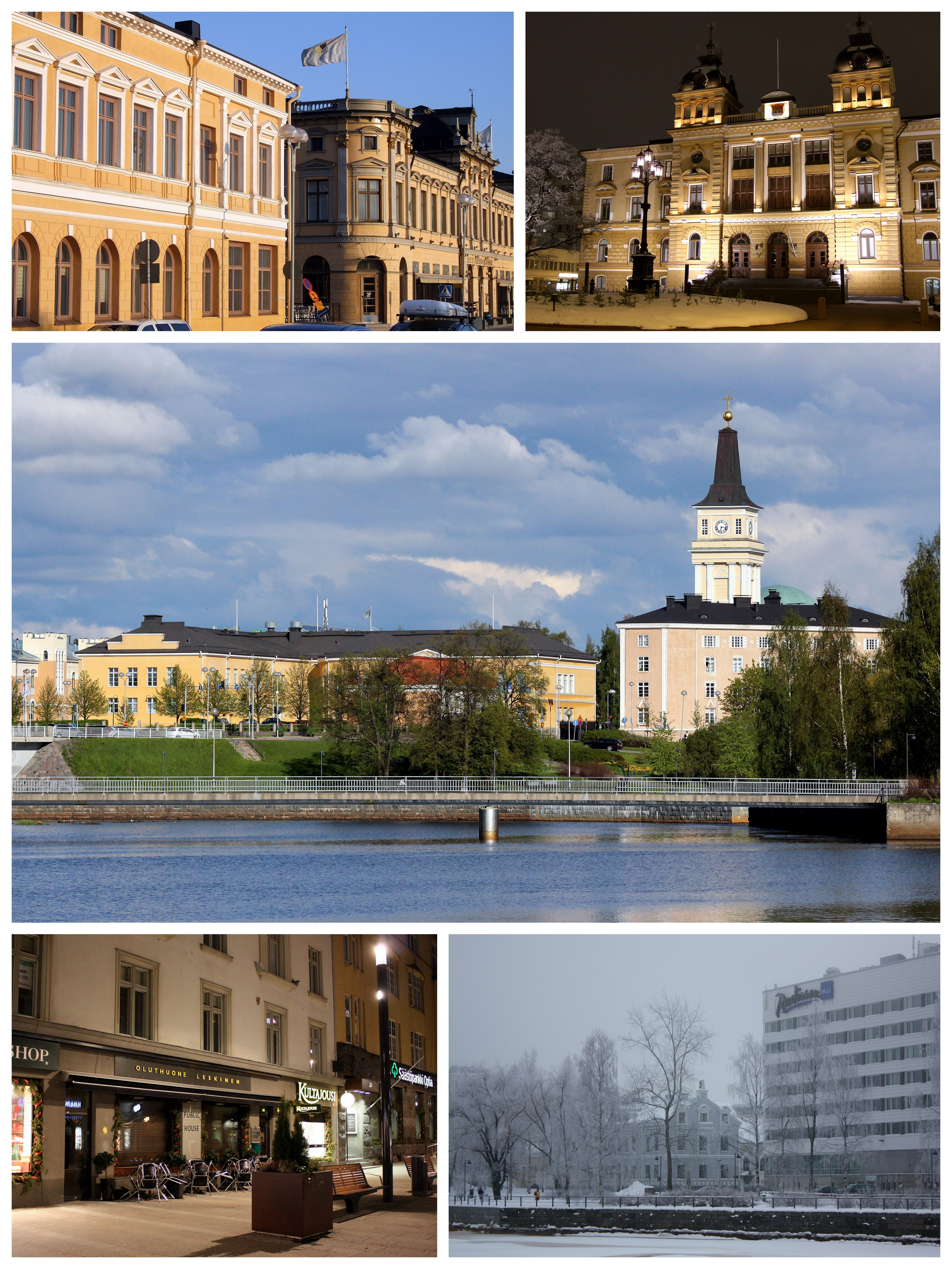
- Interactive map of Pokkinen
- Country: Finland
- City: Oulu
- Areas of Oulu: City Centre

Population (2013)
  - Total: 2 333
- Postal code: 90100

Pokkinen is a district of the city centre area of Oulu, Finland. Together with districts of Vaara and Vanhatulli, Pokkinen forms the central business district of Oulu. It is bounded by the estuary of the Oulujoki river to the west, the Koskikeskus and Myllytulli districts to the north, the Vaara district to the east and the Vanhatulli district to the south.

Pokkinen is the oldest part of Oulu. The city hall, Oulu Cathedral, the market square and other cultural and municipal institutions are located in the district.
