= Battle of Oulu =

1918 battle of the Finnish Civil War

- Part of the Finnish Civil War
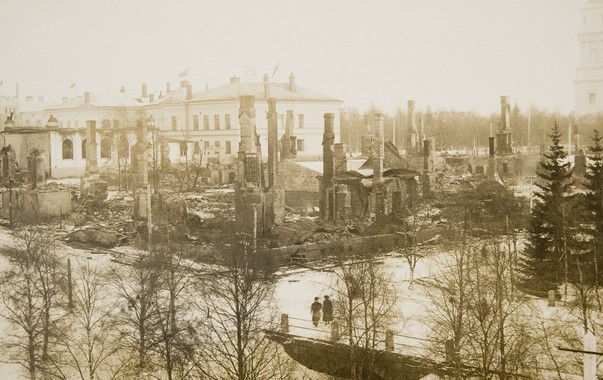
- Photograph of Oulu following the battle
Date	3 February 1918
Location	Oulu, Finland
Result	White victory

Belligerents
Finnish Whites	Finnish Reds; RSFSR Garrison

Commanders and leaders
Alexander Tunzelman von Adlerflug; Hannes Ignatius; Vilho Nenonen	Lennart Lindgren; Antti Laukkanen; Yrjö Kallinen

Strength
Around 1,200 Whites	Around 600 Finnish Reds; 1,200 RSFSR soldiers

Casualties and losses
33 in total	26 Finnish Reds fell 1 Red RSFSR soldier fell 500 Finnish Reds imprisoned 1,000 Red RSFSR soldiers imprisoned

The Battle of Oulu refers to a battle between the Whites and the Reds in the port city of Oulu during the Finnish Civil War. The battle took place on 3 February 1918.

== Red and White Order of Battle ==
The Reds had established a Red Guard in the city on 15 August 1917, however as the Guard's leader, Yrjö Mäkelin, was in Helsinki when the fighting began, Yrjö Kallinen was set as the de facto leader of the local Red Guard. Kallinen would not keep his position as the leader of the Oulu Red Guard for too long, as for he was a pacifist, and Lennart Lindgren, who was a veteran of the Second Boer War, was instead appointed as the local leader. The Reds had been supported by the local Russian Garrison, who had been stationed at a barracks in Intiö, most of the Russians were however unmotivated to fight.

The Whites in the city, had established a local White Guard which consisted of around 300 men. Vilho Nenonen was set as the local leader of this White Guard. However, as this local White Guard was so severely outnumbered, C.G Mannerheim had sent over 900 men to reinforce the city.

== Course of Events ==
Mannerheim had demanded for the local Russian Garrison to be disarmed, Which Jaeger Teodor Grünn took initiative on, disarming a small Russian Garrison at Liminga on 30 January. On the following morning, all other Russian Garrisons had surrendered their weapons, except for the one at Intiö, where a firefight broke out between the White Guard and Garrison. No White Guardsmen were wounded in this endeavor, and they demanded that the Russians surrender their weapons with no conditions for surrender. The Russians did not agree to this, instead handing over 200 guns to the Red Guard.

The Local White Guard, set up positions at the buildings of the City Government and the Oulun Lyseo Upper Secondary School, and pleaded for help from Mannerheim, Alexander Tunzelman von Adlerflug was on an expedition to relieve the city by train, however when the Reds found out about this, they intercepted the Whites at Siikajoki, and negotiations ensued. Kallinen then returned to Oulu, believing that they had been successful. On 1 February, a delegation of Russians and Reds were sent to resume the negotiations, however they stalled, as the Whites would only accept unconditional surrender. On 2 February, Kallinen resigned as he was a pacifist, and following another pacifist taking charge, Lindgren was given command. The Red Guard received more weapons from the Russian Garrison and they attacked a base of the White Guard, in attempts to curb their strength before the expedition could arrive. However it was largely unsuccessful, and the Upper Secondary School caught on fire during this ordeal.

During the Morning of 3 February, the Reds concentrated their forces against the expedition, which was now led by Hannes Ignatius, a cavalry commander. The Expedition had vastly superior weaponry, having cannons and machine guns, their cannons were placed at the north-bank of the Oulujoki. From which they shelled the barracks, amongst other strategical targets, starting their cannon-fire at 09:00 The Red Guard were concentrated around the Oulu Cemetery, the Railway Station and the local People's House. The Whites had been spread around in many different parts of city, and at one o'clock in the afternoon, the cemetery was captured was by the White forces, and the Reds at the cemetery retreated to the barracks. The fiercest firefight took place at the People's House, where the Reds had organized fortifications, however the Reds surrendered at 15:10.

The Russians did not wish to surrender, despite the fact the Reds had given up the fight. They negotiated a ceasefire, where at 23:00, the Russians surrendered en masse.

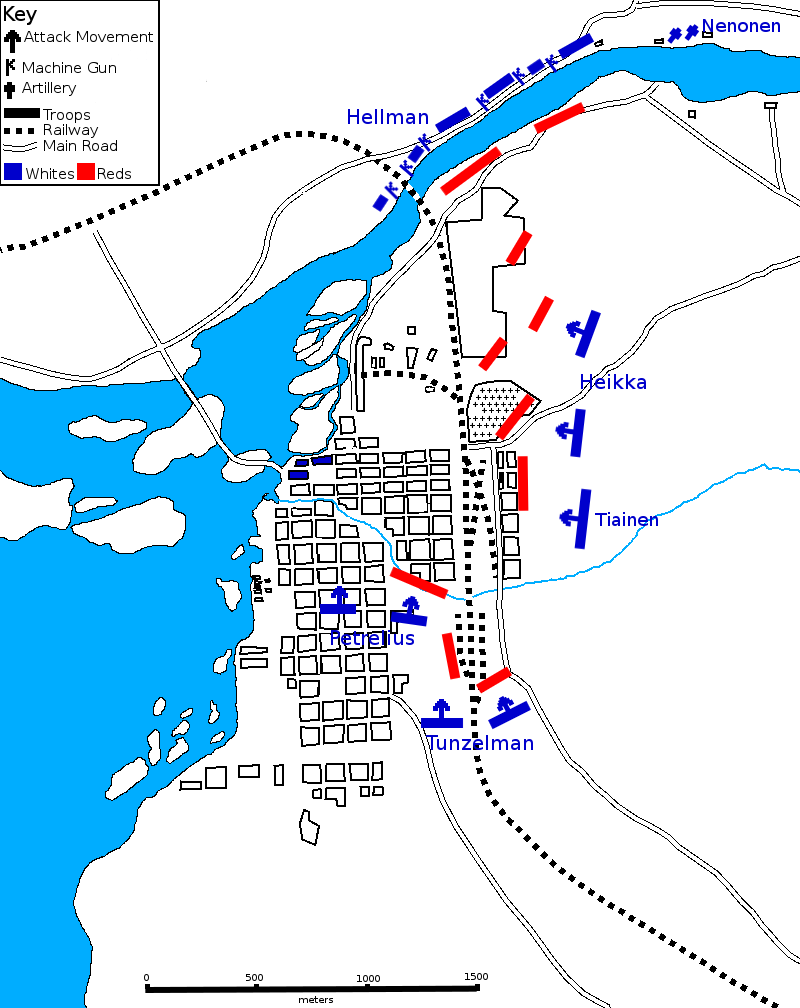
The General Overview of the city during the start of the battle.
