= Raksila =

Coordinates: 65.0080°N 25.4976°E

- District of Oulu
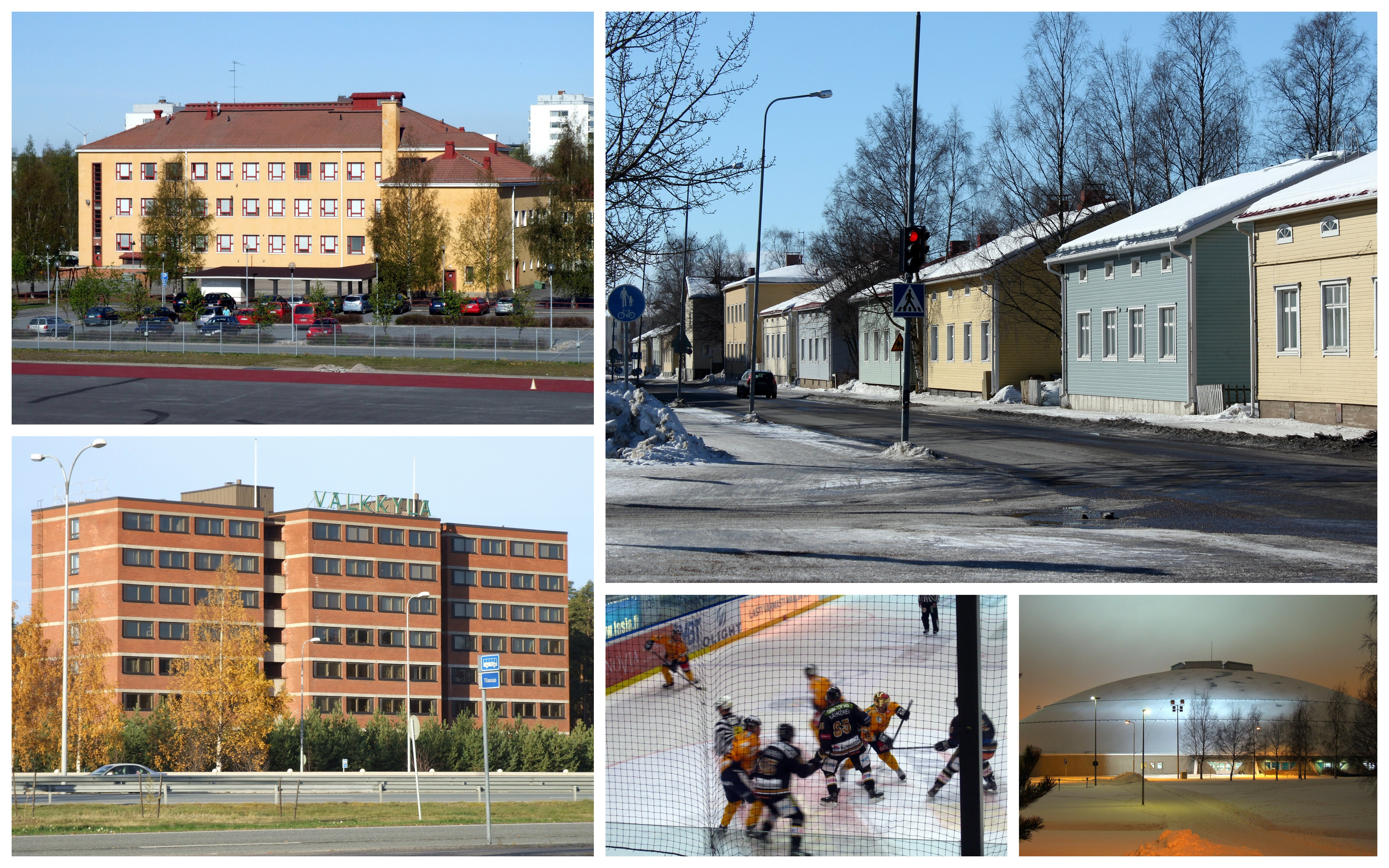
- Interactive map of Raksila
- Country: Finland
- City: Oulu
- Areas of Oulu: City Centre

Population (2019)
  - Total: 1 679
- Postal code: 90100

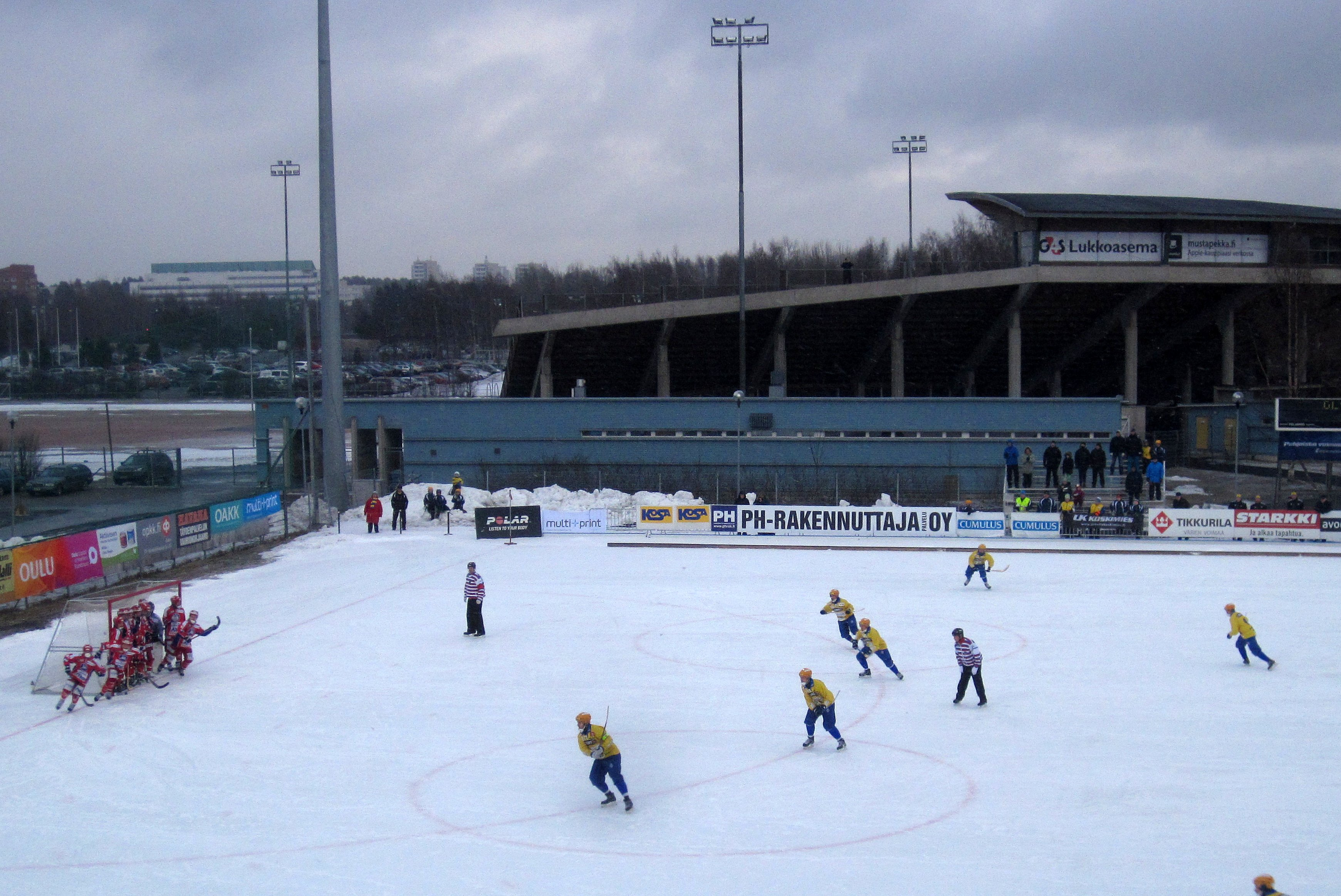
Oulun Luistinseura beat Jyväskylän Seudun Palloseura in the 2014 Bandyliiga final at Raksila Artificial Ice Rink

Raksila is a District of the city centre area of Oulu, Finland. It is bounded by the Oulu railway station to the west, the Oulu Cemetery in the Intiö district to the north, the Finnish national road 4 to the east and the Finnish national road 22 to the south.

The western part of Raksila is mainly residential area with some high-rise apartment buildings and a few blocks of older wooden townhouses. The eastern part is the Raksila Sports Center with Oulu Ice Hall, Oulu Swimming Pool, Ouluhalli indoor arena, Oulu datacenter stadium for Pesäpallo and other sports facilities, one which is Raksila Artificial Ice Rink, the main venue of the 2001 Bandy World Championship. The Välkkylä student apartments located in the district were built in 1966.

== Sights ==
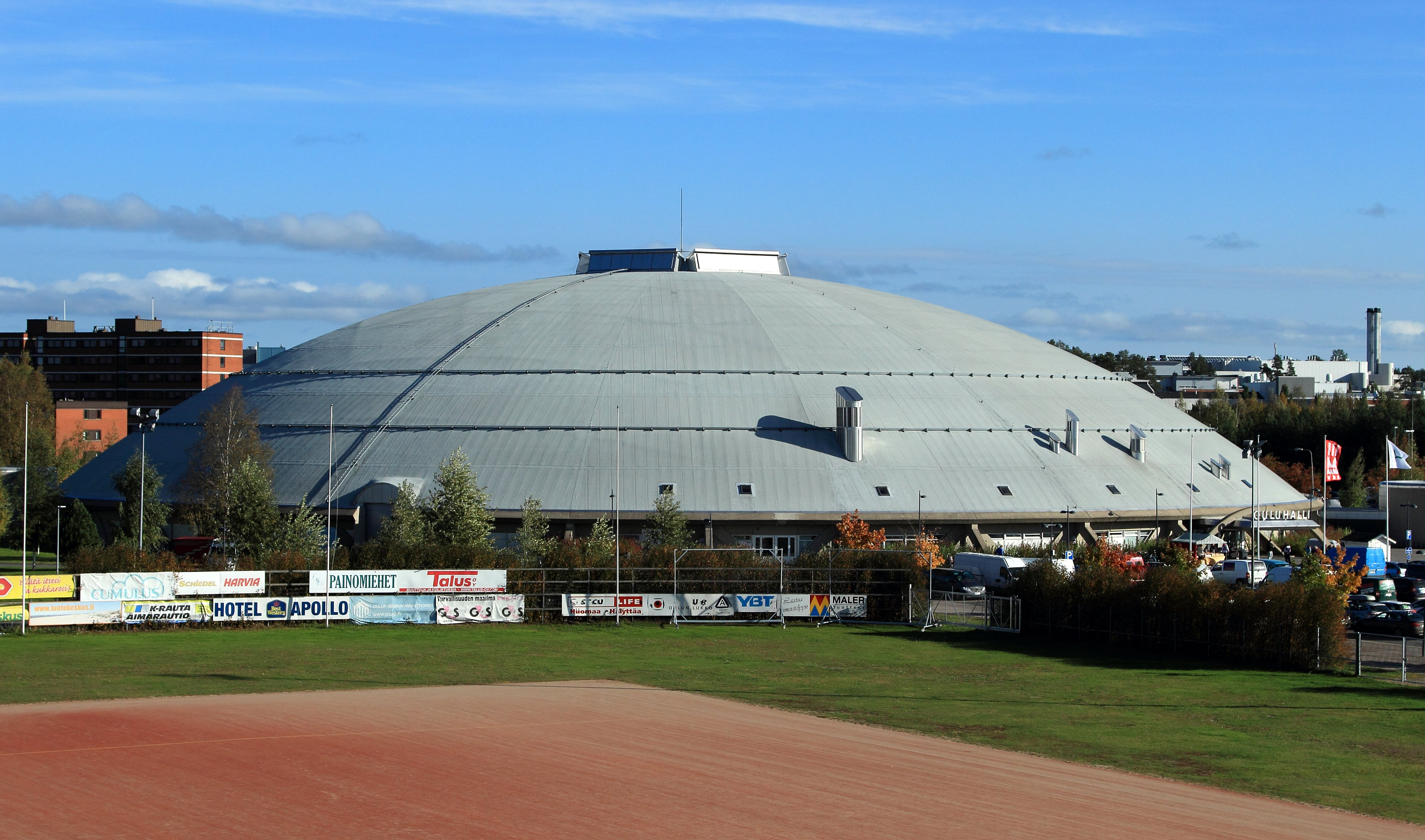
Ouluhalli indoor arena is a known landmark of Raksila

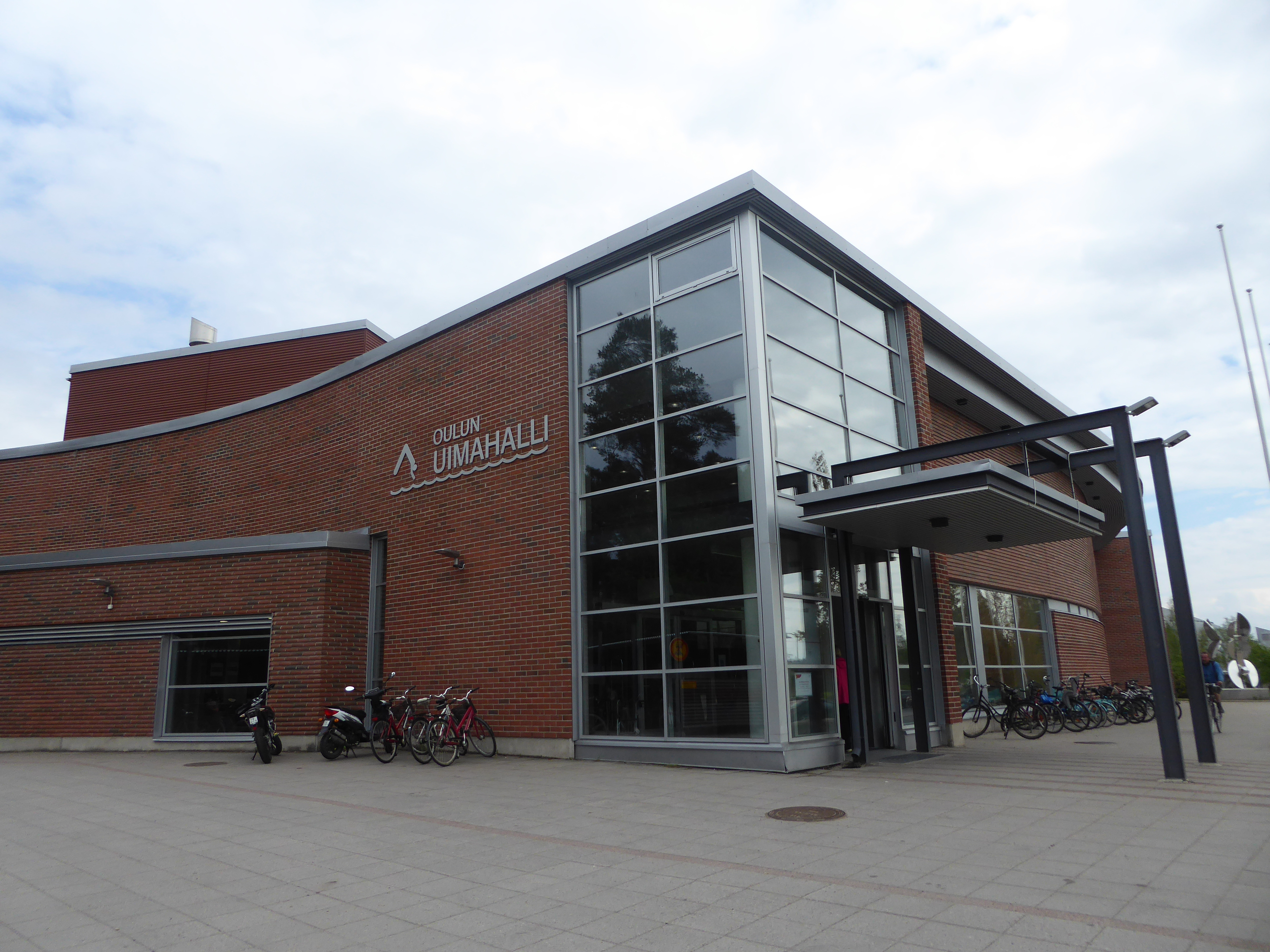
Oulu Swimming Pool building

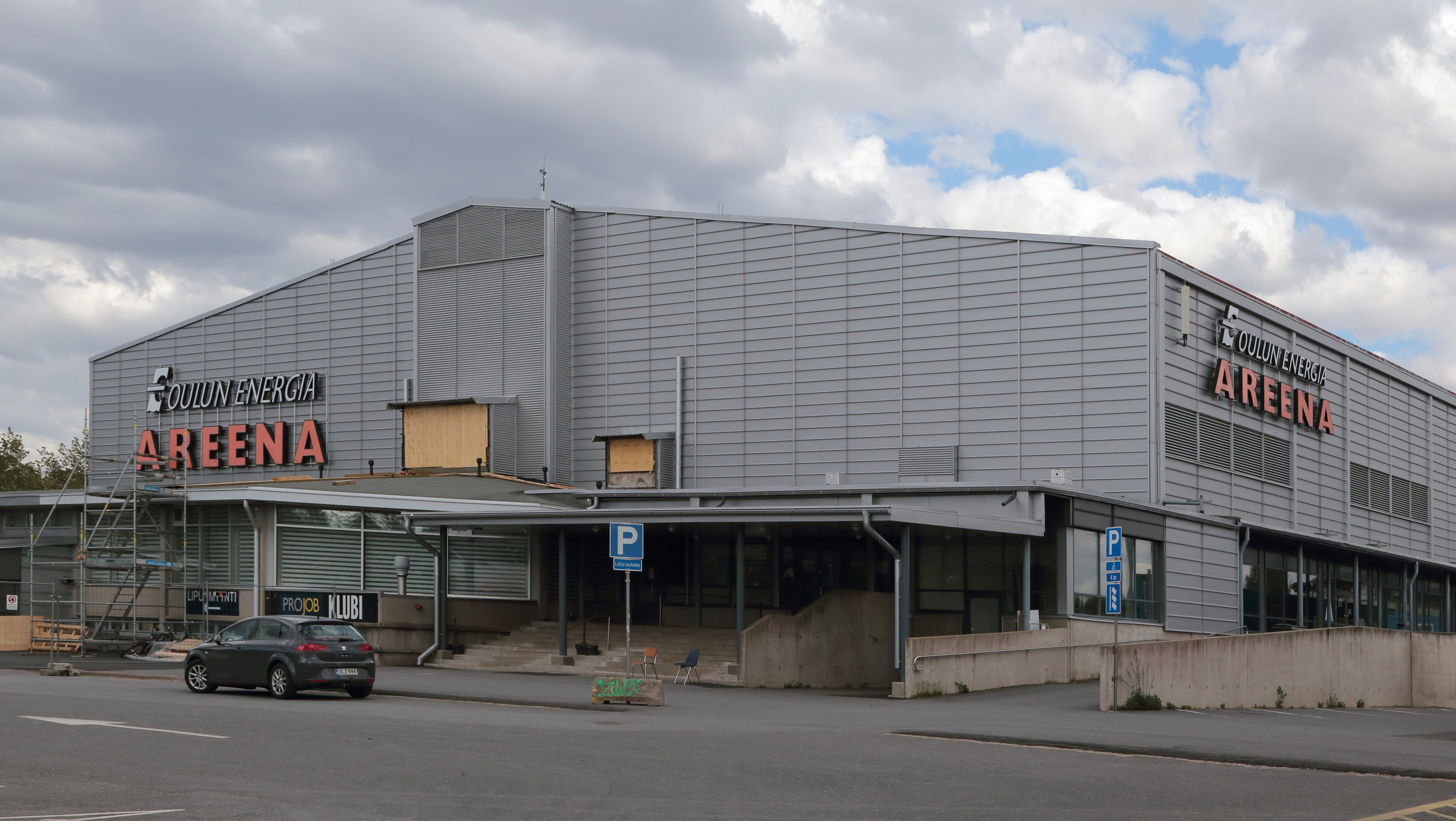
Oulu Ice Hall
