= Villa Rana =

1905 building in Jyväskylä

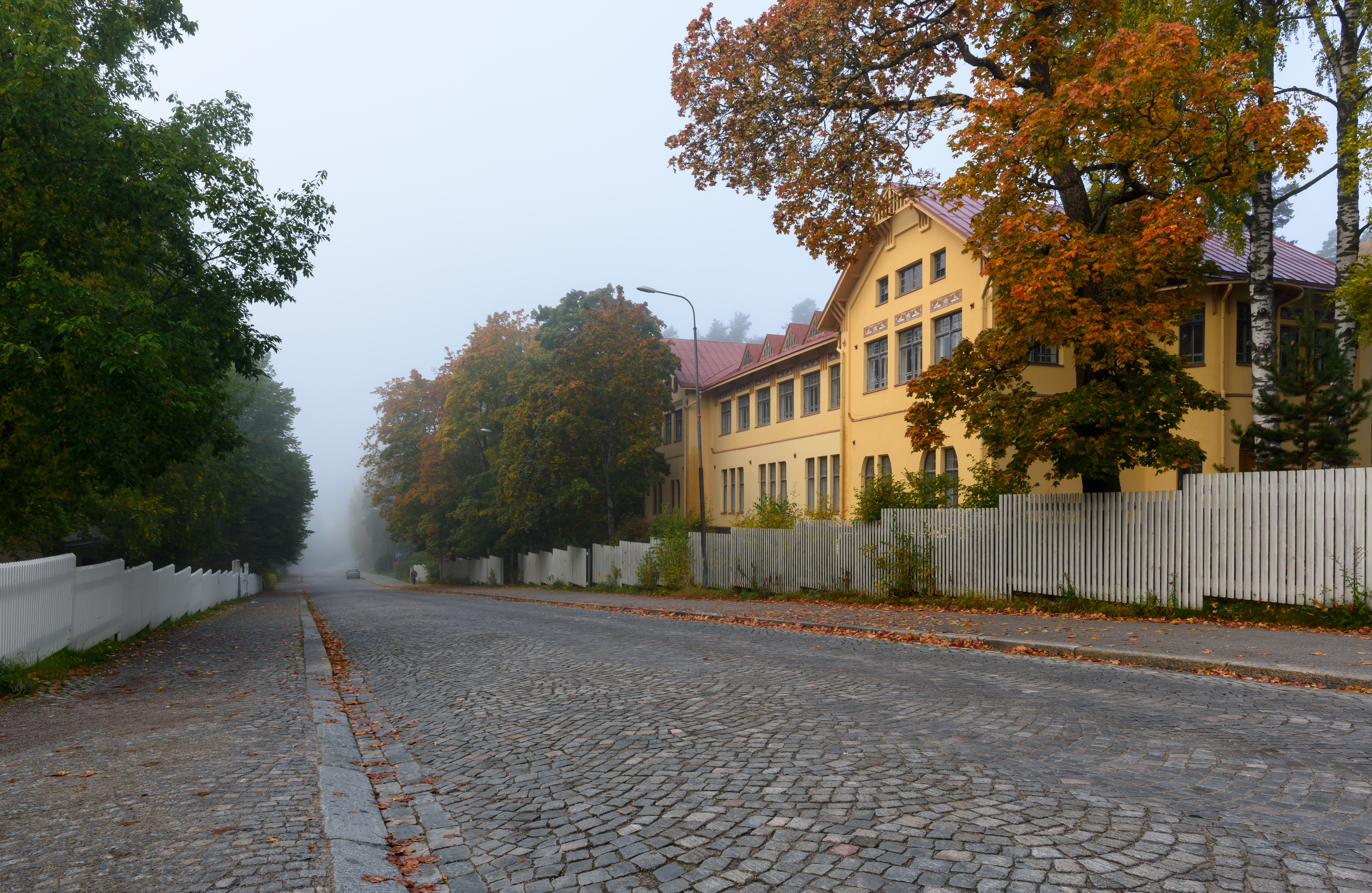
- Villa Rana and Seminaarinkatu in September 2017

General information
- Architectural style: Art Nouveau
- Location: Seminaarinkatu 13, 40100, Jyväskylä, Finland
- Coordinates: 62°14′12″N 25°44′06″E
- Owner: Keski-Suomen Suojeltavat Museokiinteistöt Oy

Design and construction
- Architect: Yrjö Blomstedt

Website
- https://www.villarana.fi/en/

Villa Rana is an Art Nouveau building designed by architect Yrjö Blomstedt on Seminaarinmäki in Jyväskylä. It was completed in 1905 and housed the drawing and sculpture rooms of the Jyväskylä seminary until the end of the 1950s. The University of Jyväskylä subsequently had offices in Villa Rana, but gave up the use of the building due to its high rent. In 2015, it was submitted to Europa Nostra's list of Europe's most endangered cultural heritage sites, but it was not selected. Instead Helsinki-Malmi Airport was the chosen entry from Finland for the list.

In the 1960s, the building was under threat of demolition, but it was saved when the seminary and the then College of Education took it into use. In the 1960s, the building was named Rana after its frog-themed ornamentation. The workspaces of the Department of History and Ethnology and lecture halls named after Blomstedt and Samuli Paulaharju.

In November 2016, Suomen Yliopistokinteistöt sold Villa Rana to Keski-Suomen suojeltavat museokinteistöt Oy. In the summer of 2021, Kulttuuritalo Villa Rana was opened on the property. It is managed by the Jyväskylä kultuturitalo tukiyhdistys ry, and permanent members are the Jyväskylä Festival Association (Jyväskylän Kesä), Central Finland Film Center, Central Finland Dance Center, Children's Music Orchestra Loiskis and Teatterikone. In the building there is also a restaurant with 44 seats and terrace opening to the Botanical Garden of the University of Jyväskylä.

== Gallery ==
Pictures of Villa Rana
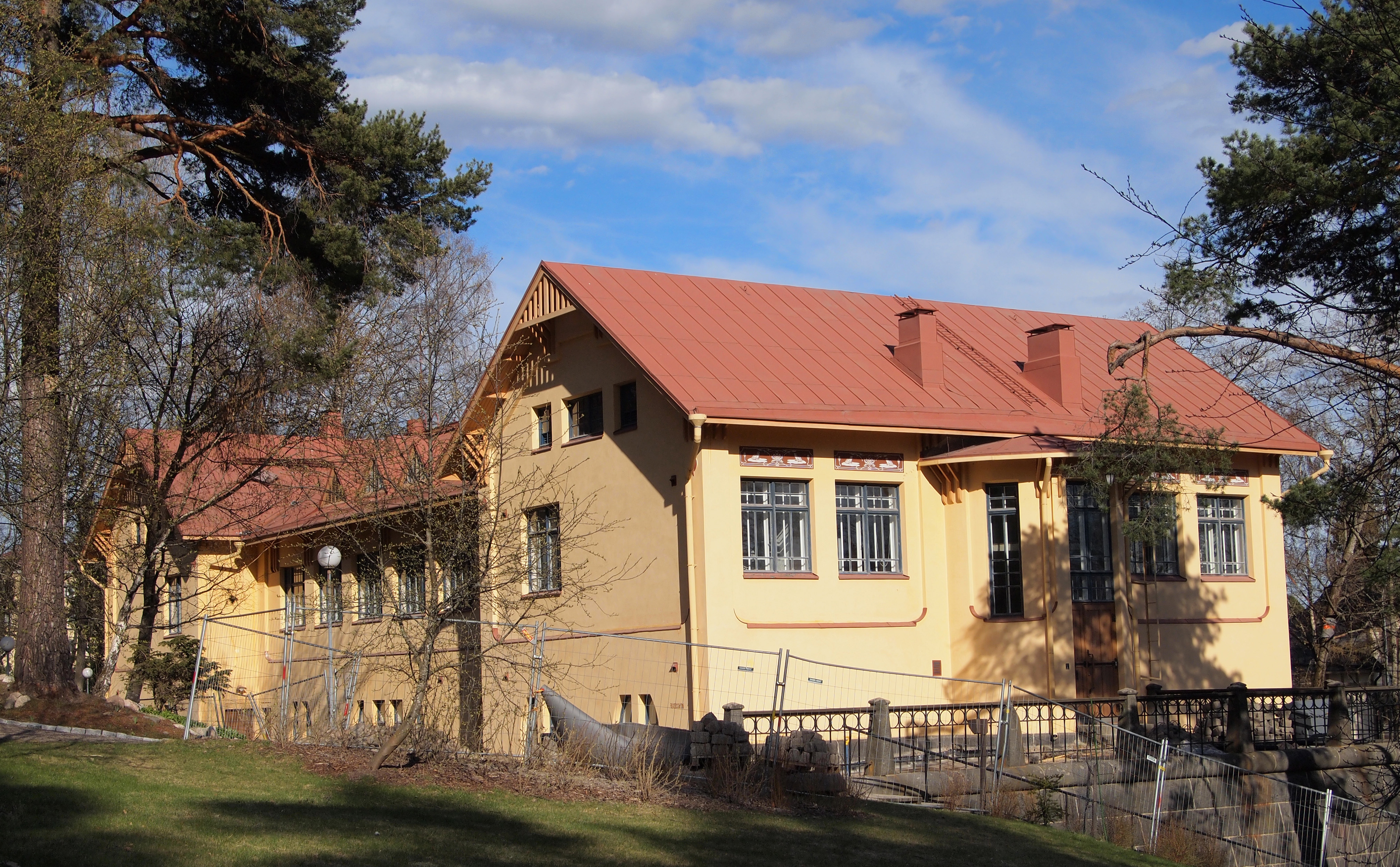
Villa Rana building seen from the site of the Seminaarinmäki campus of the University of Jyväskylä in 2014.

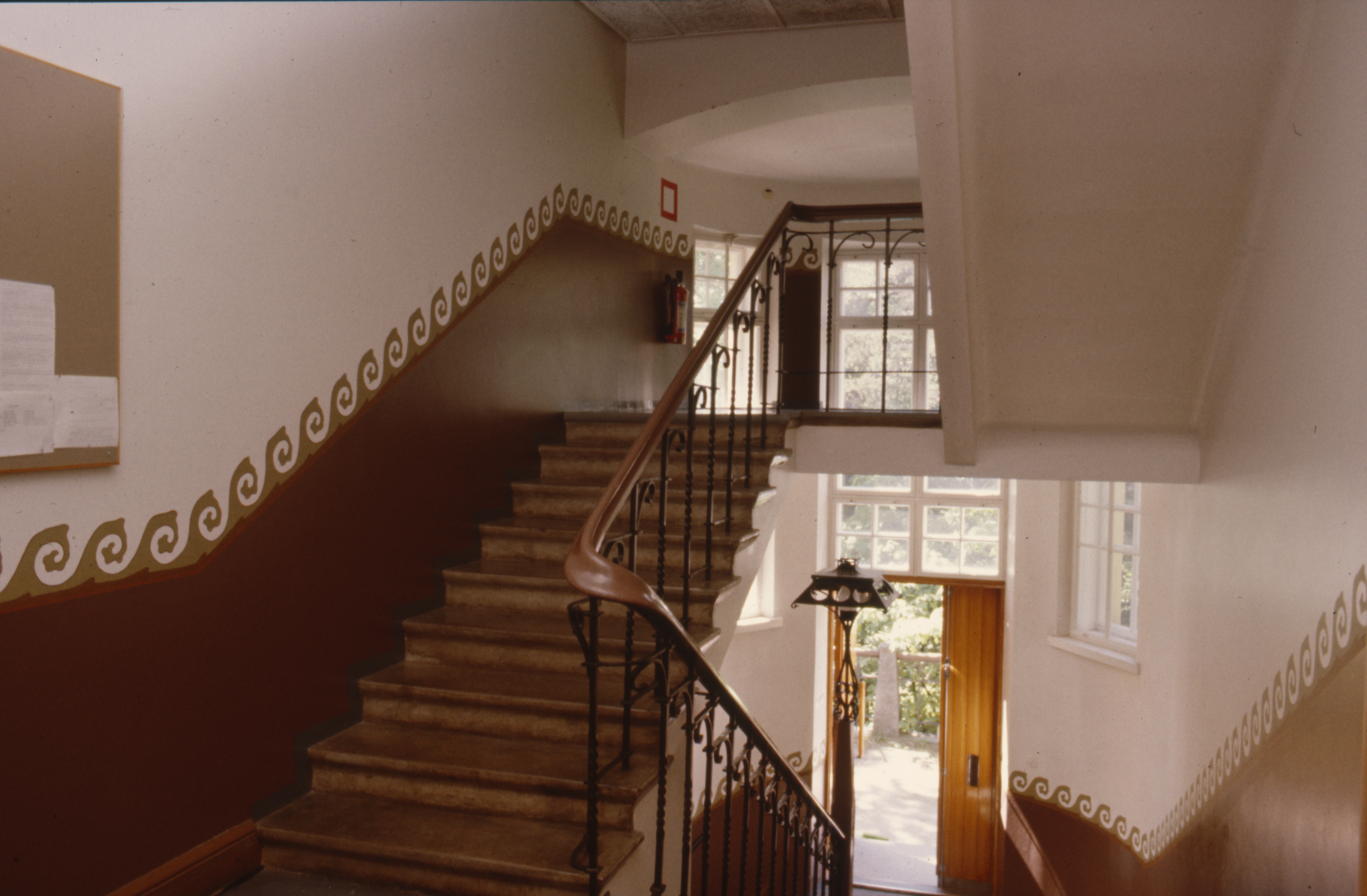
The inside of the building and the main entrance in 2017.

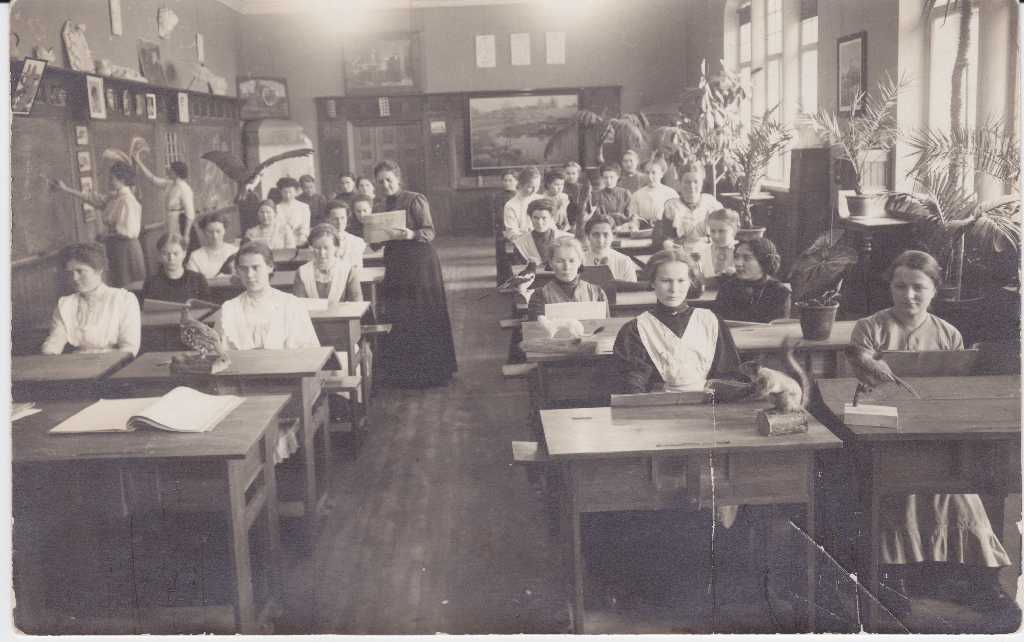
A drawing class during a female seminar at Villa Rana in 1912.

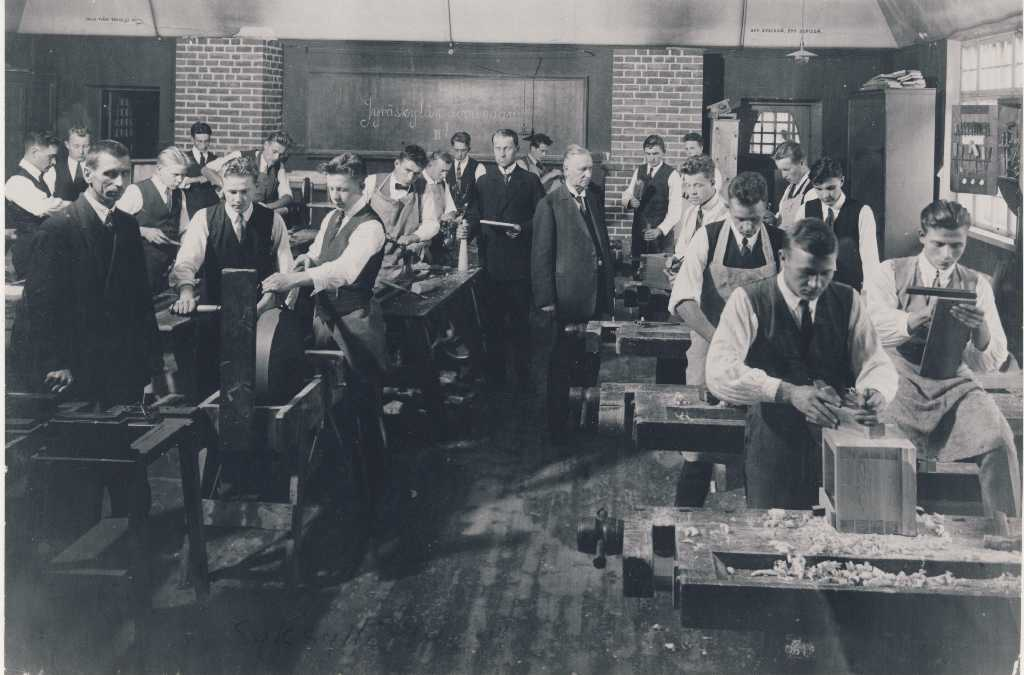
Seminar students in the handicraft class in Villa Rana in 1924.
