= Oulu International School =

- Oulun kansainvälinen koulu Uleåborgs internationella skola
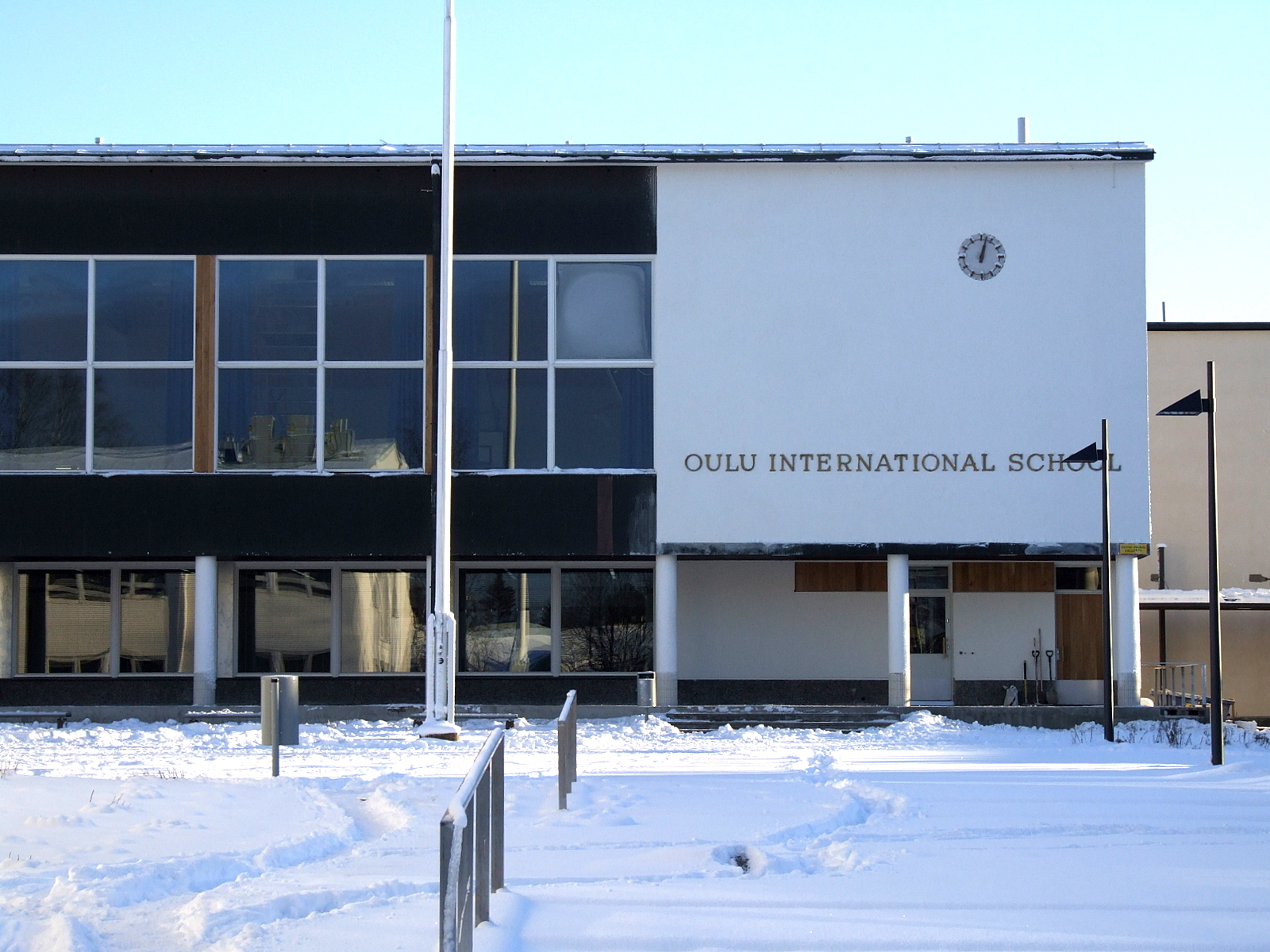

Location
- Kasarmintie 4 Myllytulli; North Ostrobothnia; Oulu; Finland
- Coordinates: 65°1′0″N 25°28′50″E

Information
- School type: State Comprehensive
- Established: 2001
- Principal: Jenni Alaniemi
- Teaching staff: About 37
- Grades: 1–9
- Age range: 7 - 16
- Language: English/Finnish
- Website: https://www.ouka.fi/oulu/Oulu-International-School

Oulu International School (OIS) is a public, not-for-profit, co-educational international school in the Myllytulli district in Oulu, Finland. The school was founded in 2001. It is one of nine English-speaking schools in Finland that offer basic education.

The school is part of the International Baccalaureate (IB) network. It offers the IB Primary Years Programme and Middle Years Programme in English, but the IB Diploma Programme is offered by Oulun Lyseon Lukio.

Oulu International School has about 430 students, ages 7 to 16 years. More than half are from Finland, but approximately 20 different nationalities are represented. Enrolment is free of charge for both Finnish people and expatriates. The principal is Jenni Alaniemi.
