= Oulu Museum of Art =

- Oulun taidemuseo
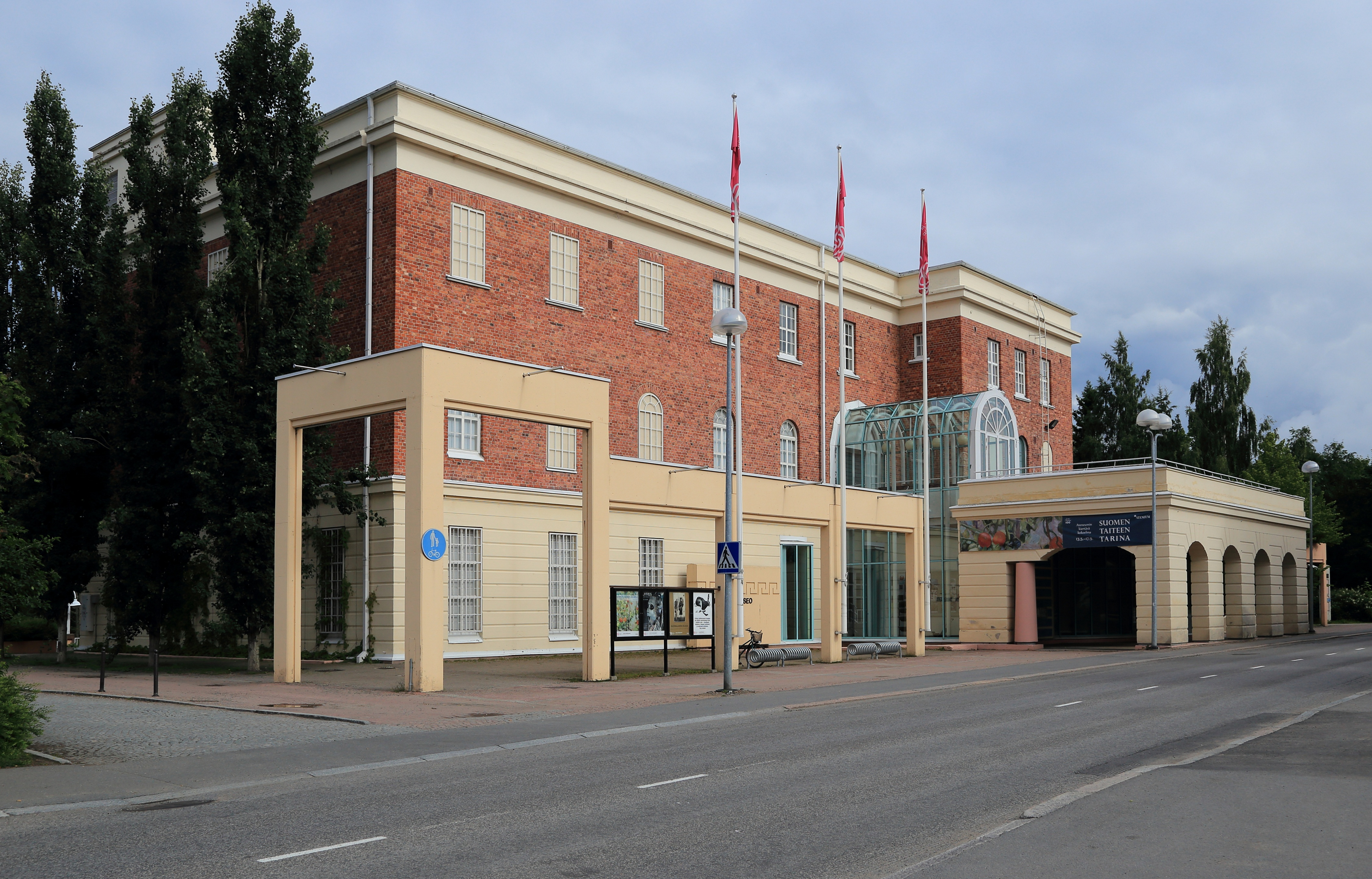
- Established: October 12, 1963
- Location: Myllytulli, Oulu
- Coordinates: 65°01′06″N 025°28′55″E
- Type: Art museum
- Visitors: 35,666 (2011)
- Owner: City of Oulu
- Public transit access: Local bus nr 17
- Website: ouluntaidemuseo.fi/en/

The Oulu Museum of Art (OMA) is an art museum in the Myllytulli neighbourhood in Oulu. It is located on the edge of the Hupisaaret Islands park.

The museum was opened to the public on October 12, 1963. The first premises were in the so-called Kolmiotalo in the city centre. From the beginning, the museum has focused mainly on the art of northern Finnish artists.

The older section of the museum building is a former office and glue factory of the Veljekset Åström Oy leather factories. The red brick building was designed by architect Birger Federley and built in 1921. It was renovated as an art museum in 1988–1990. At the time also the postmodernist extension was built.
