= Intiö water tower =

- Intiön vesitorni
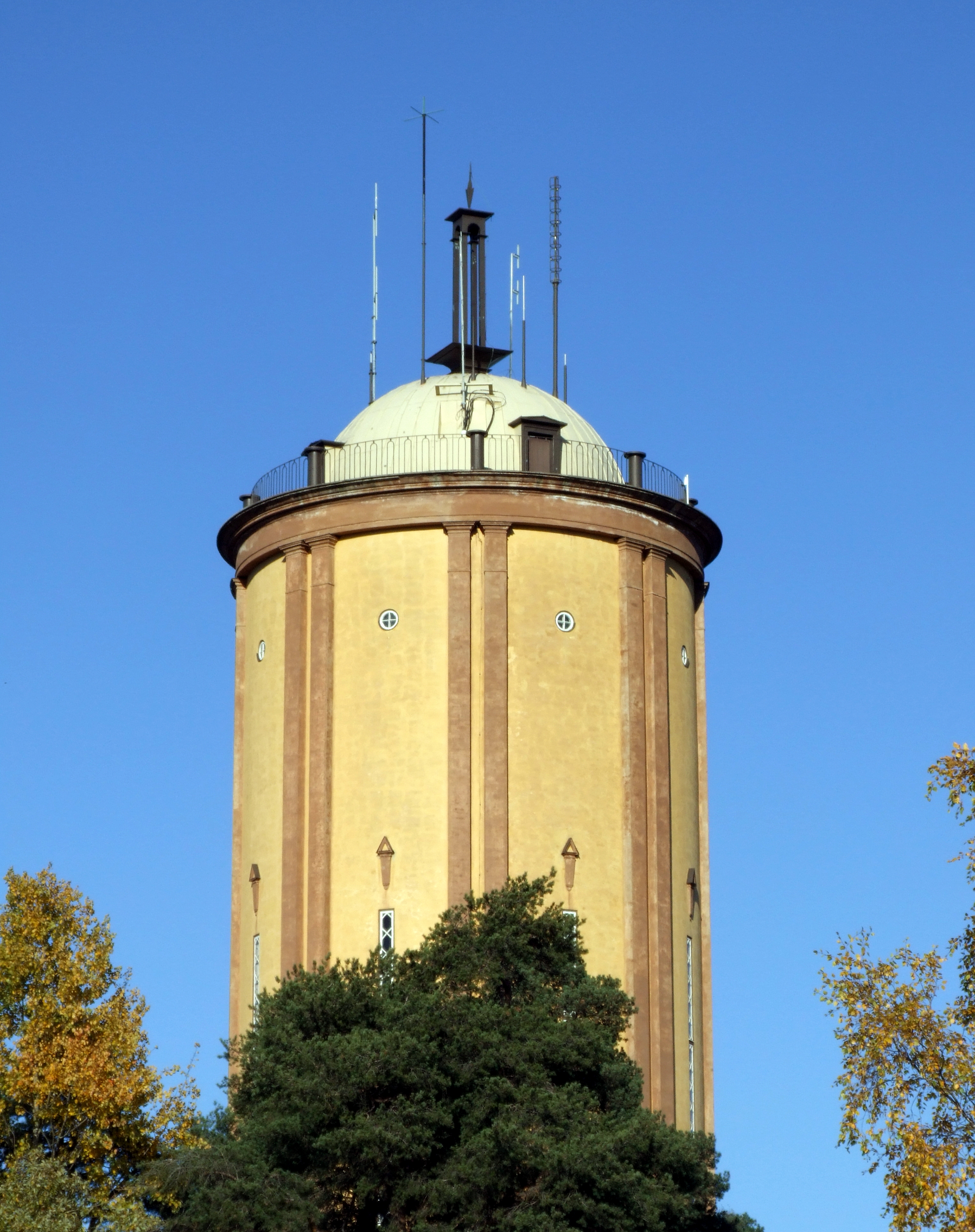
- Interactive map of the Intiö water tower area

General information
- Type: Water tower
- Architectural style: Nordic Classicism
- Location: Intiö, Oulu, Finland
- Coordinates: 65°00′57″N 025°29′46″E
- Construction started: 1926
- Completed: 1927
- Closed: 1969
- Cost: 1.69 million FIM
- Owner: private person

Design and construction
- Architect: J. S. Sirén
- Main contractor: Heikki Munter

The Intiö water tower (Finnish: Intiön vesitorni) is an unused water tower in Oulu, Finland. The water tower of the Oulu Waterworks is located in the Intiö district.

The Intiö water tower was designed by architect J. S. Sirén and completed in 1927. It is the first water tower of the Oulu Waterworks. A water tower in Myllytulli had been built in 1921, but it was only used by the Veljekset Åström leather factory. The water tower is 39 metres (128 ft) tall and capable of holding 600 cubic metres (21,000 cu ft) of water.

The water tower was closed in 1969 when a new water tower was opened in the Puolivälinkangas neighbourhood. The city of Oulu sold the water tower to a private person in 2015.
