= List of botanical gardens in Finland =

Botanical gardens in Finland have collections consisting entirely of Finland native and endemic species; most have a collection that include plants from around the world. There are botanical gardens and arboreta in all states and territories of Finland, most are administered by local governments, some are privately owned.

- , University of Helsinki, Helsinki. 800+ species indoors, 2800+ species outdoors.
- Ruissalon kasvitieteellinen puutarha, University of Turku, Turku. 5000+ species in- and outdoors.
- University of Oulu Botanical Gardens, in English University of Oulu, Oulu. 1500 species indoors, 4000 species outdoors.
- Botania – Joensuun yliopiston kasvitieteellinen puutarha, University of Eastern Finland, Joensuu. 900 species.
- Jyväskylän kasvitieteellinen puutarha, in English, University of Jyväskylä, Jyväskylä.
- Mustila Arboretum, Elimäki.
