= Oulu Swimming Pool =

Indoor swimming pool in Oulu, Finland

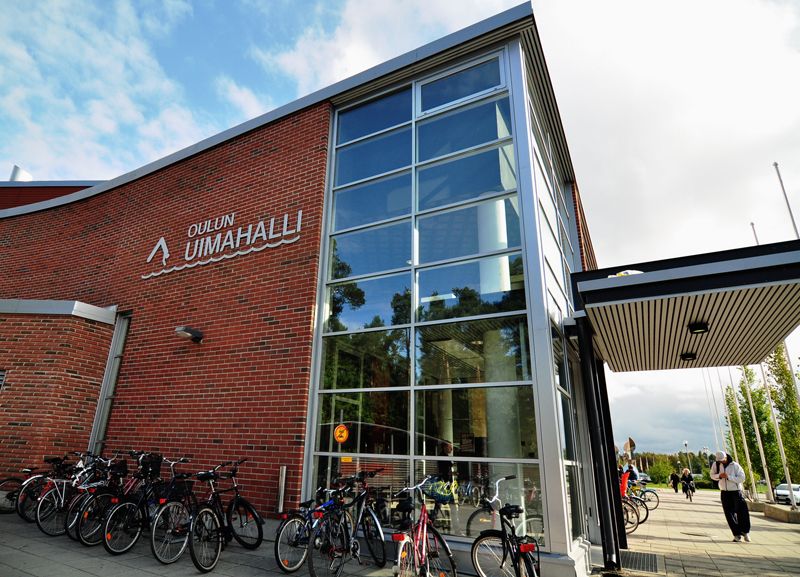
- Interactive map of Oulu Swimming Pool
- Location: Pikkukankaantie 3, Oulu
- Coordinates: 65.0092°N 25.4987°E
- Owner: City of Oulu
- Operator: City of Oulu
- Dimensions: Length: 50 metres (164 ft)

Construction
- Opened: 4 November 1974
- Closed: 28 February 2025
- Demolished: 2025
- Cost: 12.6 million FIM
- Architect: Risto Harju

Website
- www.ouka.fi/en/swimming-pools

Oulu Swimming Pool was an indoor swimming pool in the Raksila neighbourhood in Oulu, Finland. It was the biggest of the three indoor swimming pools in Oulu and one of the biggest in Finland. The swimming pool designed by architect Risto Harju was completed in 1974.

The main pool was a 50-metre (164 ft) pool with eight lanes. In addition to the main pool, there were a 25-metre (82 ft) lap pool, children's pools, a pool with a water slide and an activity pool. The diving tower had platforms at ten, seven, five and three metres.

The pool came to national light in 2018, when an unknown man repeatedly defecated in the water.

The pool was permanently closed on 28 February 2025 and demolished in 2025. It will be replaced with a new building, due to open in 2029.
