= Northern Ostrobothnia Museum =

- Pohjois-Pohjanmaan museo
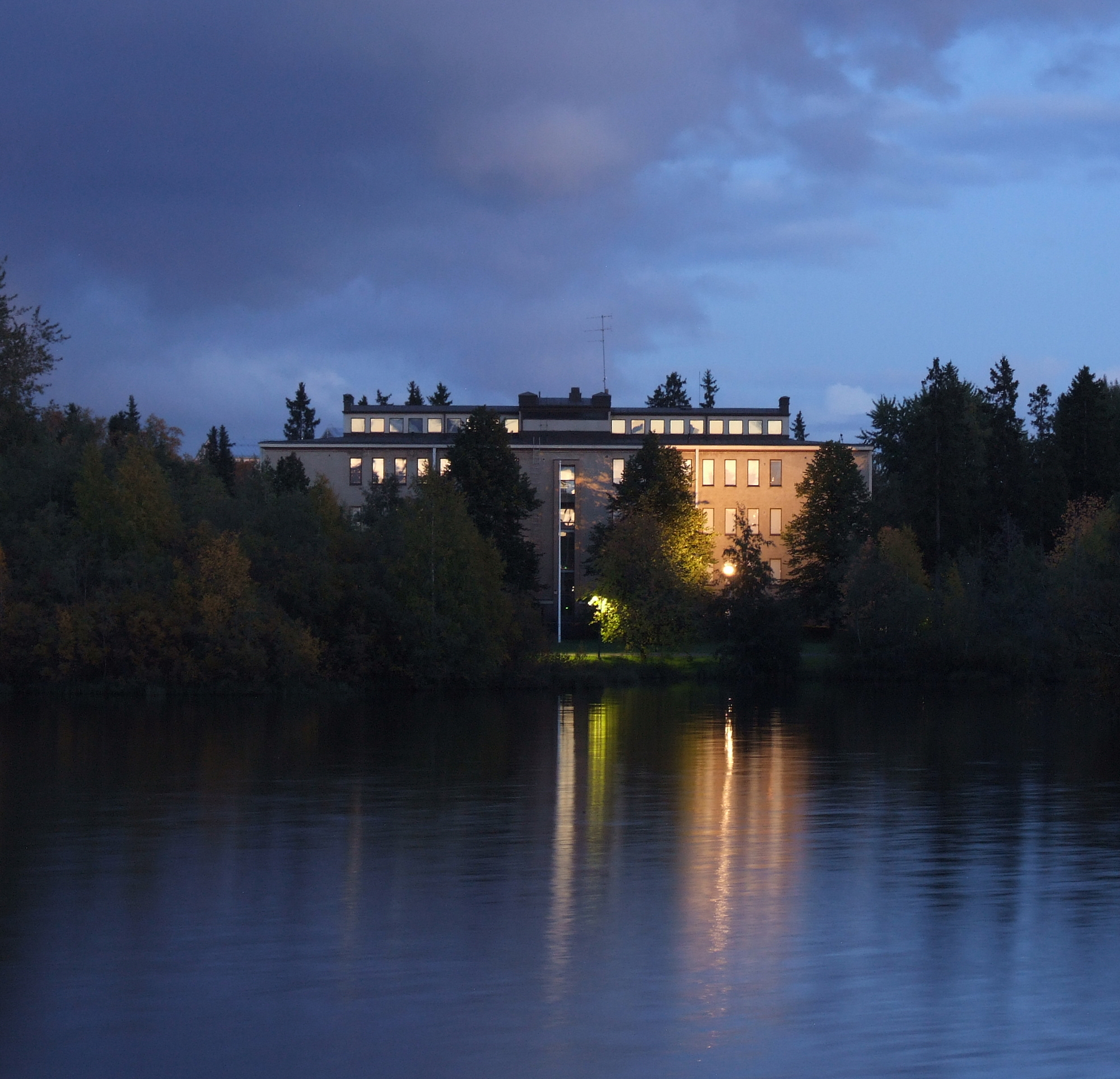
- The Northern Ostrobothnia museum in autumn 2007
- Established: 1896
- Location: Myllytulli, Oulu, Finland
- Coordinates: 65°01′04″N 025°28′31″E
- Type: Provincial museum
- Director: Pasi Kovalainen
- Owner: City of Oulu
- Website: www.ouka.fi/oulu/luuppi-english/northern-ostrobothnia-museum

The Northern Ostrobothnia Museum (Finnish: Pohjois-Pohjanmaan museo) is a museum of cultural history. This provincial museum focuses on the city of Oulu and its surrounding Northern Ostrobothnia region. The museum is situated in the Hupisaaret Islands park in the Myllytulli neighbourhood in Oulu, Finland.

The museum was founded in 1896 and it was maintained by a museum society until 1969, when the ownership was handed over to the city of Oulu. Between the years 1911–1929 the museum operated in an old wooden villa, Villa Ainola, which was destroyed in a fire on July 9, 1929. Some of the collections of the museum were also destroyed. Soon after the fire the current museum building began construction on the site of the old villa. The new stone house was completed in 1931. The building was designed by Finnish architect Oiva Kallio. Oulu City Library was also located in the building until 1982.

The basic exhibition extends in all the other floors of the building except the bottom floor, which is dedicated to the changing exhibitions and an exhibition for the children. The exhibition for the children is based on the Doghill books by Finnish children's author Mauri Kunnas. The ground floor hosts a large scale model of Oulu city centre in the year 1938 before the bombings of World War II.

In addition to the main museum the Northern Ostrobothnia museum maintains Sailor's Home Museum in Pikisaari, Pateniemi Sawmill Museum and Turkansaari Open-air Museum.
