= University of Oulu Botanical Gardens =

Botanical garden in Oulu, Finland

Coordinates: 65°3′47″N 25°27′55″E

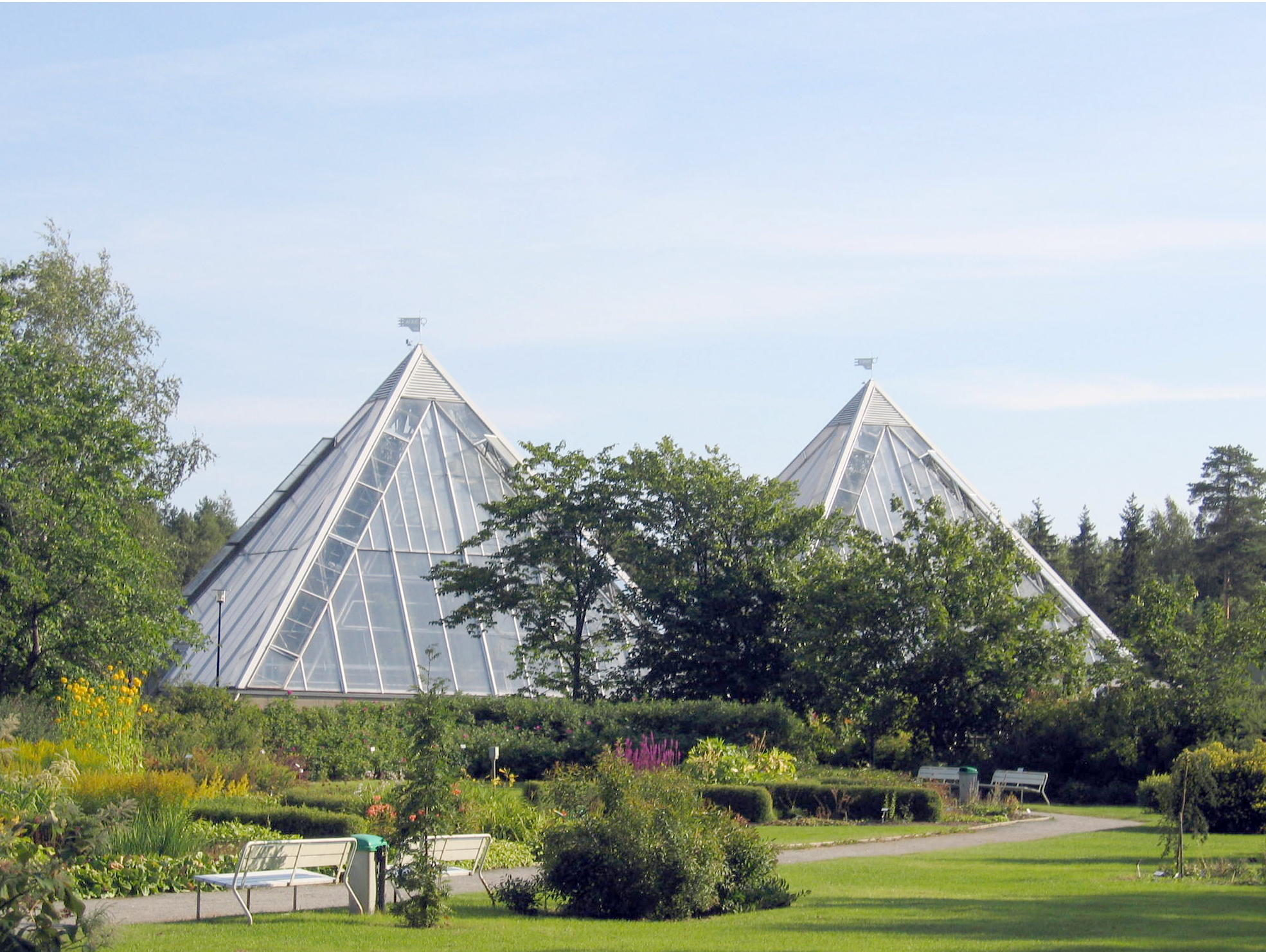
Botanical garden greenhouses.

The Botanical Garden of the University of Oulu is one of the northernmost scientific gardens in the world. Botanical Garden collection of plants is maintained for teaching and research purposes and it is open to the public.

Collections include more than 4,000 different plant species and provide an overview of global vegetation diversity. Botanical Garden is also a testing and experimental area for many new and rare plants.

The landmark of the Oulu Botanical Garden are the pyramid-shaped greenhouses Romeo and Julia where about 1,200 exotic plant species are presented.

The University of Oulu Botanical Gardens are located on the main campus of the University of Oulu in Linnanmaa district in Oulu, Finland on the shore of Lake Kuivasjärvi. Botanical gardens were moved to Linnanmaa from the Hupisaaret Islands park near the city centre in the summer of 1983.

In the same premises with the Botanical Garden are also located University of Oulu Botanical and Zoological Museums.

The Botanical Museum is responsible for species information in a large part of Northern Finland and acts as an expert in its field. The activities of the museum are coordinated with the Central Museum of Natural History.

The Zoological Museum conducts high-level international research in the field of animal taxonomy and systematics and biogeography. Areas of research include evolutionary biology, conservation biology, and issues related to endangered species.

Museum collections are currently not available to public.
