= Oulu Prison =

Prison in Oulu, Finland

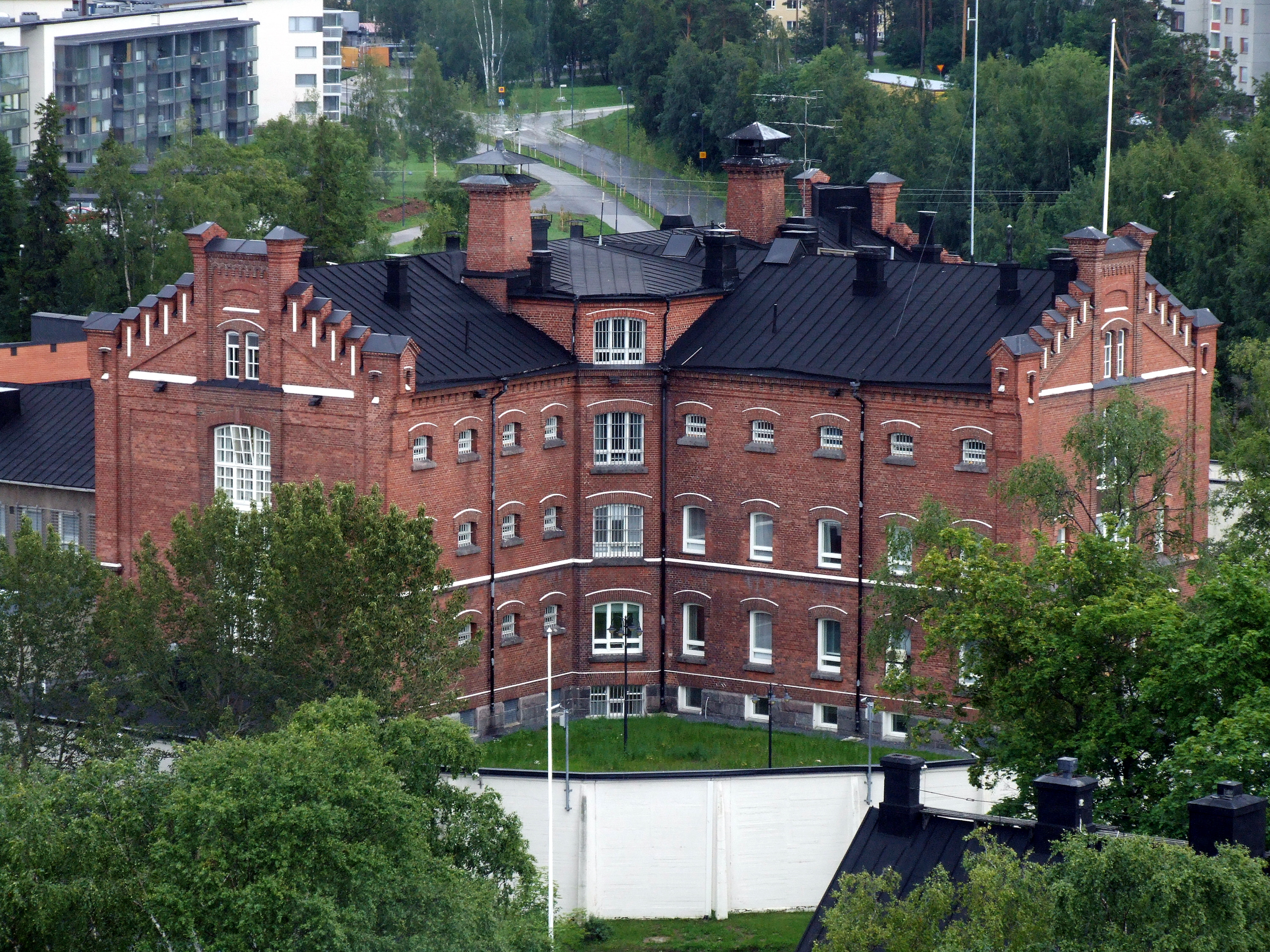
- Interactive map of Oulu Prison
- Location: Myllytulli, Oulu, Finland; 65°01′05″N 25°29′22″E
- Status: Operational
- Capacity: 80
- Population: 87 (2012)
- Opened: 1885
- Former name: Oulu Provincial Prison
- Managed by: The Criminal Sanctions Agency of Finland
- Director: Margit Kyngäs
- Website: www.vankeinhoito.fi/en/index/units/prisons/ouluprison.html

The Oulu Prison (earlier known as Oulu Provincial Prison) is a prison located in the Myllytulli neighbourhood in Oulu, Finland. There are 80 prison places, of which ten are reserved for female prisoners. The mean prison population in 2012 was 87.

The main prison building was completed in 1885 and it was designed by architect Ludvig Isak Lindqvist. The first prisoners were transferred to the prison on the 25th of July. The prison wall was first made of timber, until it was replaced with the current concrete wall in 1914.
