= Samuli Paulaharju =

Finnish teacher, ethnographer, and writer

Professor Samuli Paulaharju
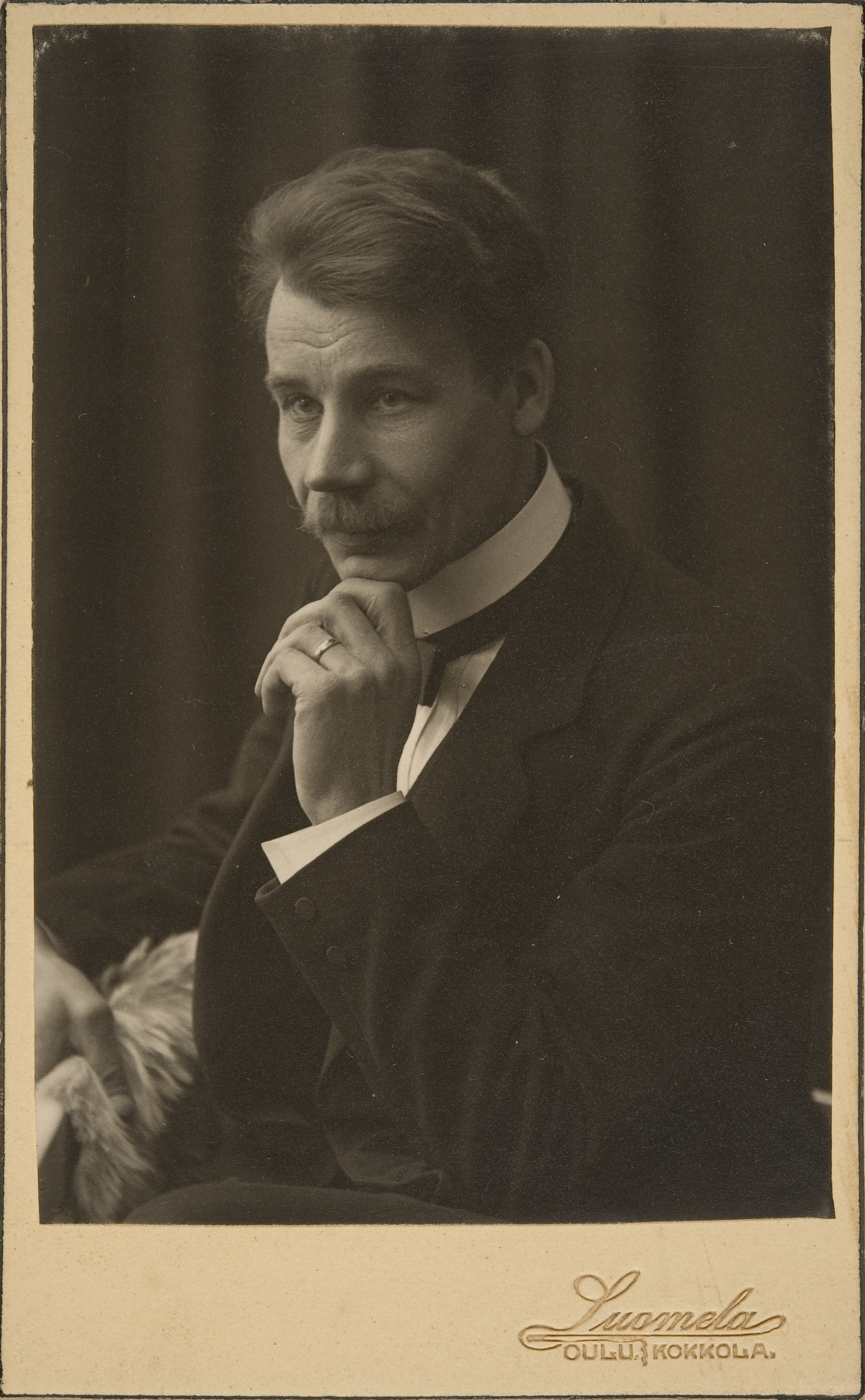
- Born: April 14, 1875; Kurikka, Finland
- Died: February 6, 1944 (aged 68); Oulu, Finland
- Resting place: Oulu Cemetery
- Occupations: Teacher, ethnographer, writer
- Writing career
- Language: Finnish

Samuli Paulaharju (14 April 1875 – 6 February 1944) was a Finnish teacher, ethnographer and writer. He was granted with the title of Professor in October 1943.

Paulaharju was born in Kurikka in 1875. He studied in the Jyväskylä Teacher Seminary and graduated in 1901. After graduation, he first worked in Uusikirkko but in 1904 he moved to Oulu to work as a crafts and arts teacher in a school for deaf-mute children. Paulaharju spent summers for field trips collecting folklore, in the winter he wrote his works and taught in the school. He wrote 21 books, hundreds of journal articles, took over eight thousand photographs and made thousands of drawings on his trips.

Since 1908 Paulaharju also worked as a curator for the Northern Ostrobothnia museum in Oulu. Nowadays Paulaharju's study and library can be found in the museum. Samuli Paulaharju is buried in the Oulu Cemetery.
