= St. Luke's Chapel, Oulu =

St. Luke's Chapel
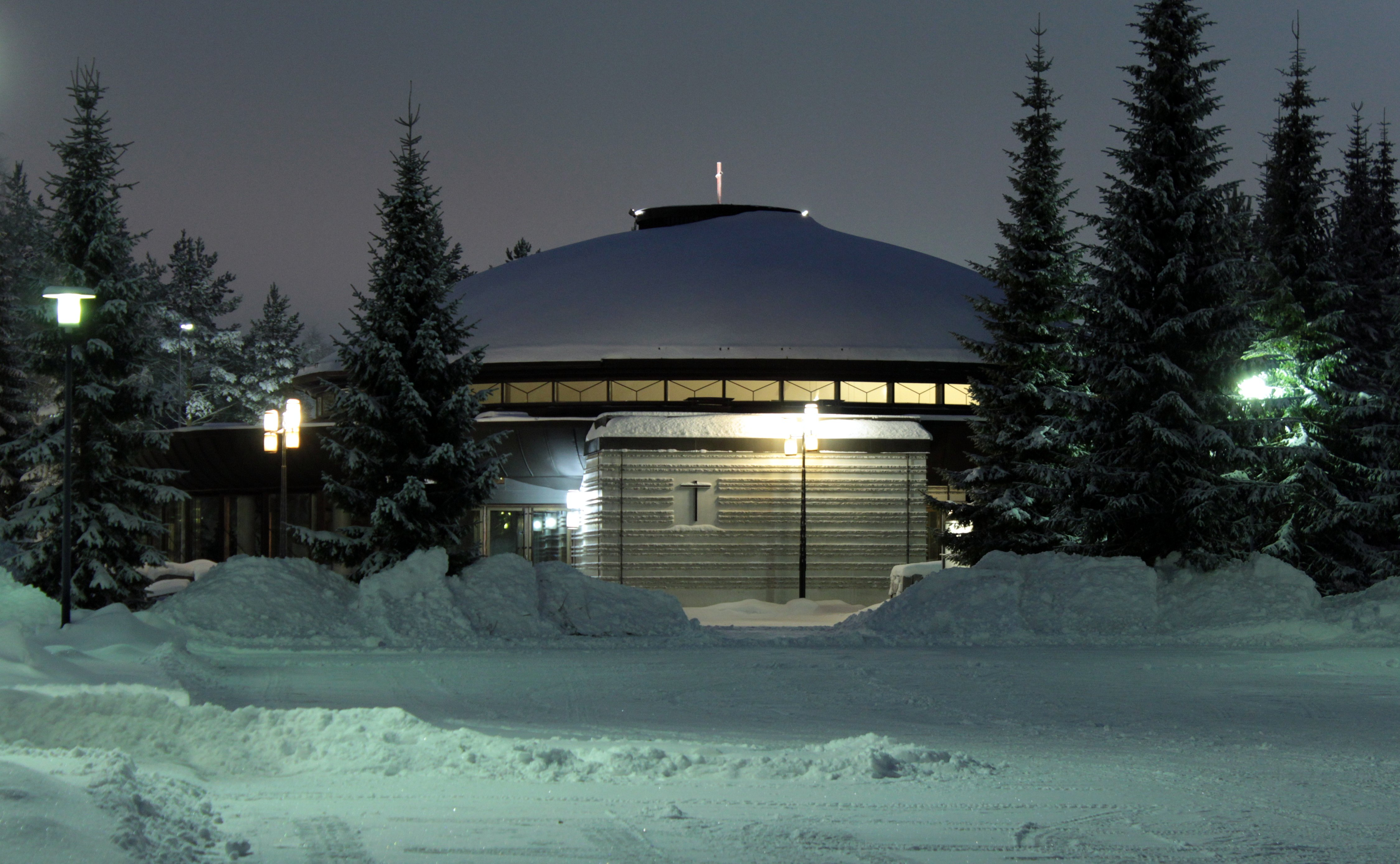
- St. Luke's Chapel
- 65°03′37″N 025°28′18″E
- Location: Linnanmaa, Oulu
- Country: Finland
- Denomination: Lutheran
- Website: http://www.oulunseurakunnat.fi/pyhanluukkaankappeli

History
- Status: Church

Architecture
- Functional status: Active
- Architect(s): Seppo Kähkönen and Markku Kuhalampi
- Completed: 1988

Specifications
- Capacity: 200

Administration
- Diocese: Diocese of Oulu
- Parish: Tuira parish

St. Luke's Chapel is an evangelical Lutheran church in the University of Oulu Linnanmaa campus in Oulu. The opening service of the academic year is held at St. Luke's chapel. Services in English are held on Sundays.

The church building has been designed by architects Seppo Kähkönen and Markku Kuhalampi. It was completed in 1988. The chapel was extended with church hall and other meeting spaces in 2003.
