= Tietomaa =

Science Centre Tietomaa
- Tiedekeskus Tietomaa
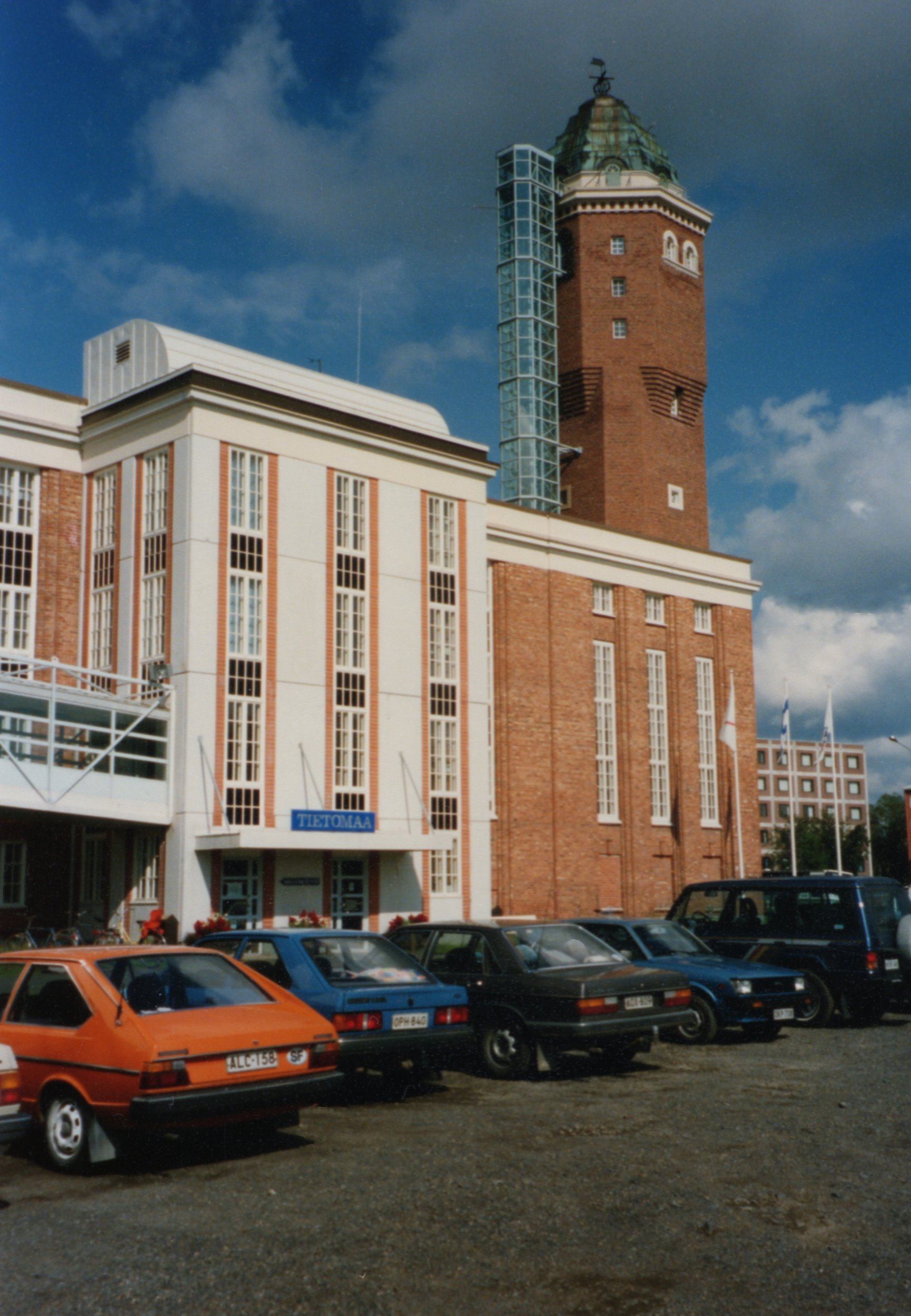
- Tietomaa in 1989.
- Established: 29 June 1988
- Location: Myllytulli, Oulu
- Coordinates: 65°01′05″N 025°29′03″E
- Type: Science Center
- Visitors: 74 567 (2008)
- Director: Jonna Tamminen
- Owner: City of Oulu
- Public transit access: Local bus nr 17
- Website: www.tietomaa.fi

Tietomaa (knowledge land) is a science centre in Oulu, Finland. It is located in Myllytulli district near the city centre. It is the first science centre in Finland and it was opened to the public on 29 June 1988.

Tietomaa is located in old buildings of the Veljekset Åström Oy, a former leather processing factory. The main exhibitions are located in the former power station. Tietomaa's 45-metre (148 ft) observation tower with a glass elevator outside the tower is a former water tower of the factory. Tietomaa also features a giant movie theatre, which at its opening was the first-ever purpose-built IMAX theatre in Finland and in the Nordic Countries. The IMAX system was replaced with a Barco 4K system in 2013.

== See also ==
- List of science centers#Europe
