= Teuvo Pakkala =

Finnish author and playwright

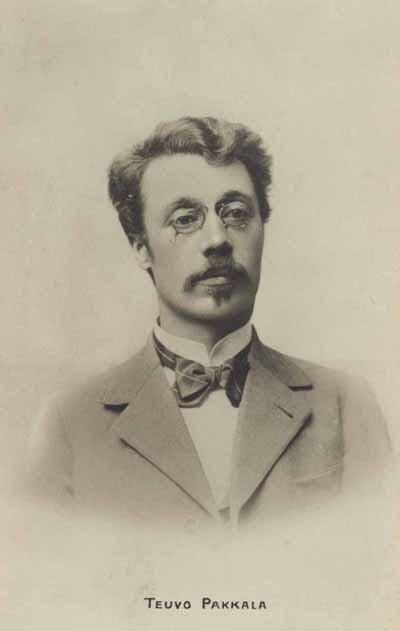
- Pakkala in 1890
- Born: 9 April 1862; Oulu, Finland
- Died: 17 May 1925 (aged 63); Kuopio, Finland

Teuvo Pakkala (originally Teodor Oskar Frosterus, 9 April 1862 – 17 May 1925) was a Finnish author, playwright, reporter, linguist and teacher.

Pakkala is considered to be one of the realists of the 1880s and 1890s, and he is also often called a naturalist. Pakkala's works are especially noted for their portrayal of children.

== Life ==
Teuvo Pakkala was born in Oulu, Finland, where he also went to school. He studied medicine, languages and history in the university. His writing career started as a journalist. He also translated works of Norwegian writers Henrik Ibsen, Jonas Lie, Alexander Kielland and Knut Hamsun. As a journalist he followed closely the industrialisation and urbanisation of Oulu in the 1870s and 1880s.

Pakkala was skilful in describing people, especially women and children. He worked as a teacher 1907–1920, and shows in his books about children an unprecedented understanding of child psychology. His works were not much appreciated in his own time. One of the reasons may be, that he also wrote "folk drama", including a very popular musical play "Tukkijoella". Tukkijoella is a comedy about lumberjacks, and it is still the most-performed play in Finland.

Pakkala worked also in Jyväskylä and died in Kuopio. He is buried in the Oulu Cemetery.

== Filmmaking career ==
Sotapolulla (1921), written and directed by Pakkala

Late in his life, Teuvo Pakkala became interested in filmmaking. In 1921 he co-founded the original Finn Film in Oulu, Finland, with Toivo T. Kaila and G.H. Michelson.

Finn Film produced its only movie, Sotapolulla (On the Warpath), in 1921. Pakkala wrote the screenplay and directed the film.

== Written works ==
=== Novels and collections of short stories ===
- Oulua soutamassa (1885)
- Vaaralla (1891)
- Elsa (1894)
- Lapsia (1895)
- Pieni elämäntarina (1902)
- Pikku ihmisiä (1913)
- Kertomuksia (1928)
- Väliaita ja muita kadonneita kertomuksia (1986)

=== Plays ===
- Kauppaneuvoksen härkä (1901)
- Meripoikia (1915)
- Tukkijoella (1899)

=== Non-fiction works ===
- Aapinen (1908)
- Kirjeet 1882–1925 (1982)
- Lapsuuteni muistoja (1885)

=== Translations into Finnish language ===
- Aina (= Forssman, Edith): Uusia kertomuksia Iltalampun ääressä (1895)
- Hamsun, Knut: Victoria (1899)
- Hellwald, Friedrich Anton Heller von: Maa ja sen kansat (1900)
- Ibsen, Henrik: Pikku Eyolf (1895)
- Kielland, Alexander Lange: Työmiehiä (1884)
- Lie, Jonas: Luotsi ja hänen vaimonsa (1895)
- Malot, Hector: Koditon 1–2 (1898–1899)
- Meyer, Leopold: Pienten lasten hoito (1904)
- Nansen, Fridtjof: Pohjan pimeillä perillä 1–2 (1896–1897)
- Nansen, Fridtjof: Suksilla poikki Grönlannin (1896)
- Weyman, Stanley: Susi (1898)
