= Finn Film =

Finnish motion picture corporation

Finn Film is a Finnish motion picture corporation. It was established in 1921 but made only one movie before finishing business in 1922. It was re-established in 2001.

== Original corporation ==
The original Finn Film was founded in 1921 in Oulu, Finland, by playwright Teuvo Pakkala, Dr. Toivo T. Kaila, and M.Sc. G.H. Michelson.

Sotapolulla (1921), the only production by the original Finn Film

Finn Film produced its first and only movie, Sotapolulla, in 1921. It was shown in movie theaters starting on 30 January 1922 (release date: 20 January 1922). The screenplay for the film was written by Teuvo Pakkala. The film - 65 minutes in length (1500 meters) - was also directed by Teuvo Pakkala. The actors in the films included:

- Lisi Caren
- Yrjo Hirviseppa
- Jorma Vaajakallio
- Solveig Wohlstrom
- Lilly Caren
- Oskari Oka
- Bertel Nordenstreng
- J. V. Leino
- Hannes Seppanen
- Hildi Hartikainen
- Maija Pakkala
- Samuli Pakkala

Sotapolulla is currently archived in the National Audiovisual Archive of Finland. Due to its old age, its politically interesting post-Finnish-Civil-War timing of production, and its rare, good condition, it is considered historically valuable both nationally as well as internationally.

The original Finn Film finished business in 1922, mainly due to the lack of movie-watching audiences in theaters, following the Finnish Civil War.

== Revived corporation ==
The present-day Finn Film began service in 2001, following in the footsteps of the original founders, and it is still based in Oulu, Finland.
