= Hupisaaret Islands =

Public urban park in Oulu, Finland

- Hupisaarten kaupunginpuisto
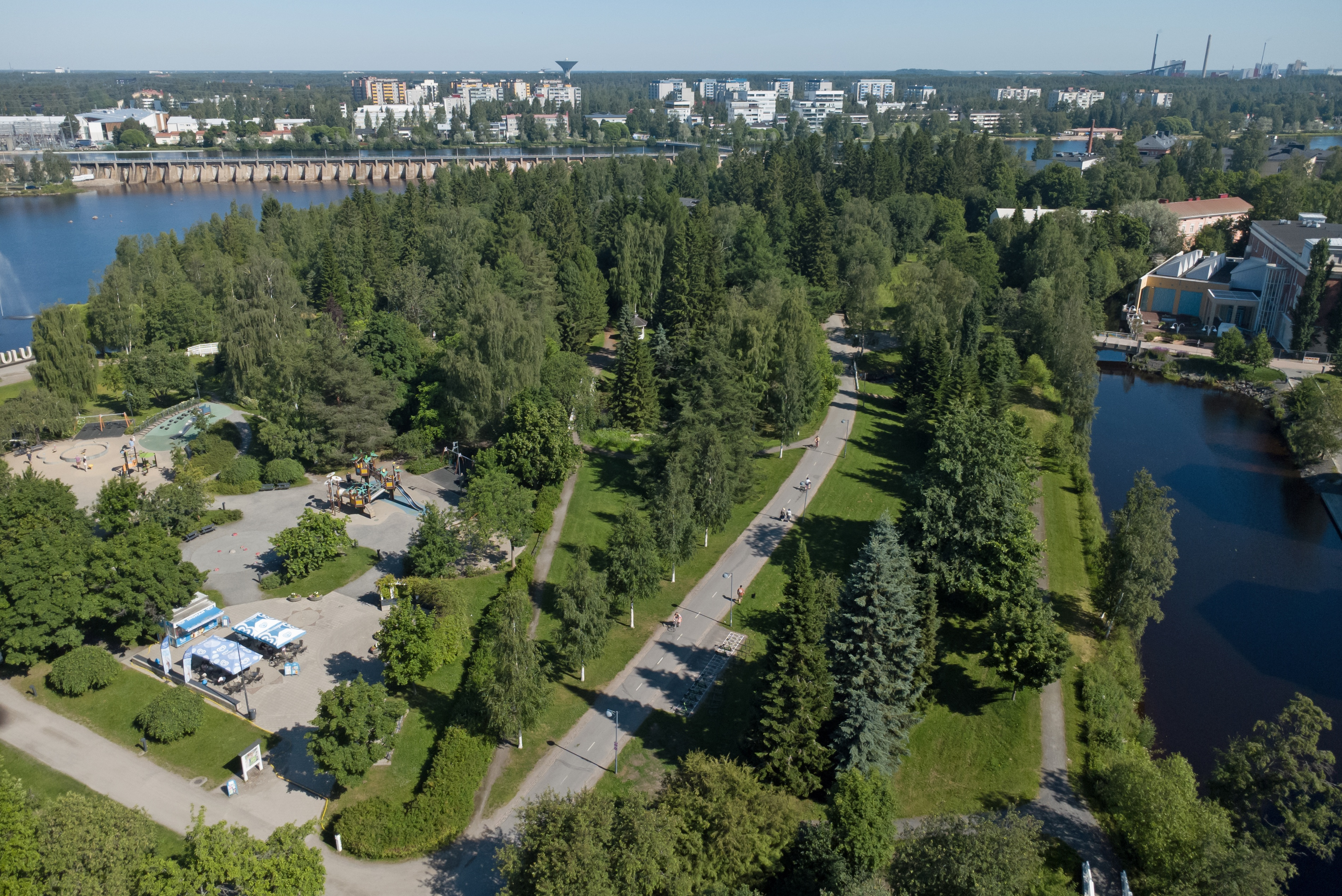
- The Hupisaaret Islands park in Oulu

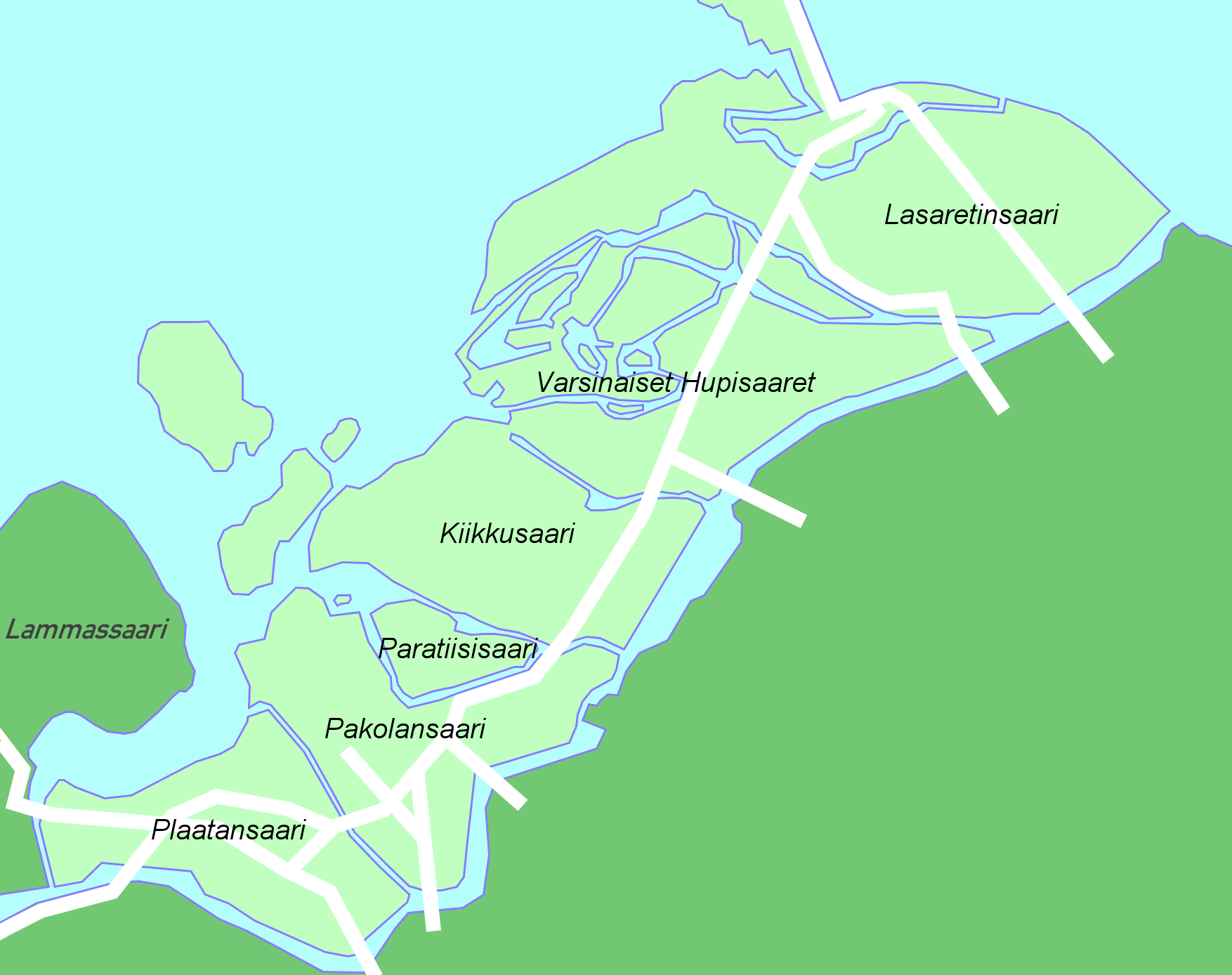
- Type: Urban park
- Location: Myllytulli, Oulu, Finland
- Coordinates: 65°01′06″N 025°28′39″E
- Created: 1860s
- Operator: City of Oulu
- Open: Open all year

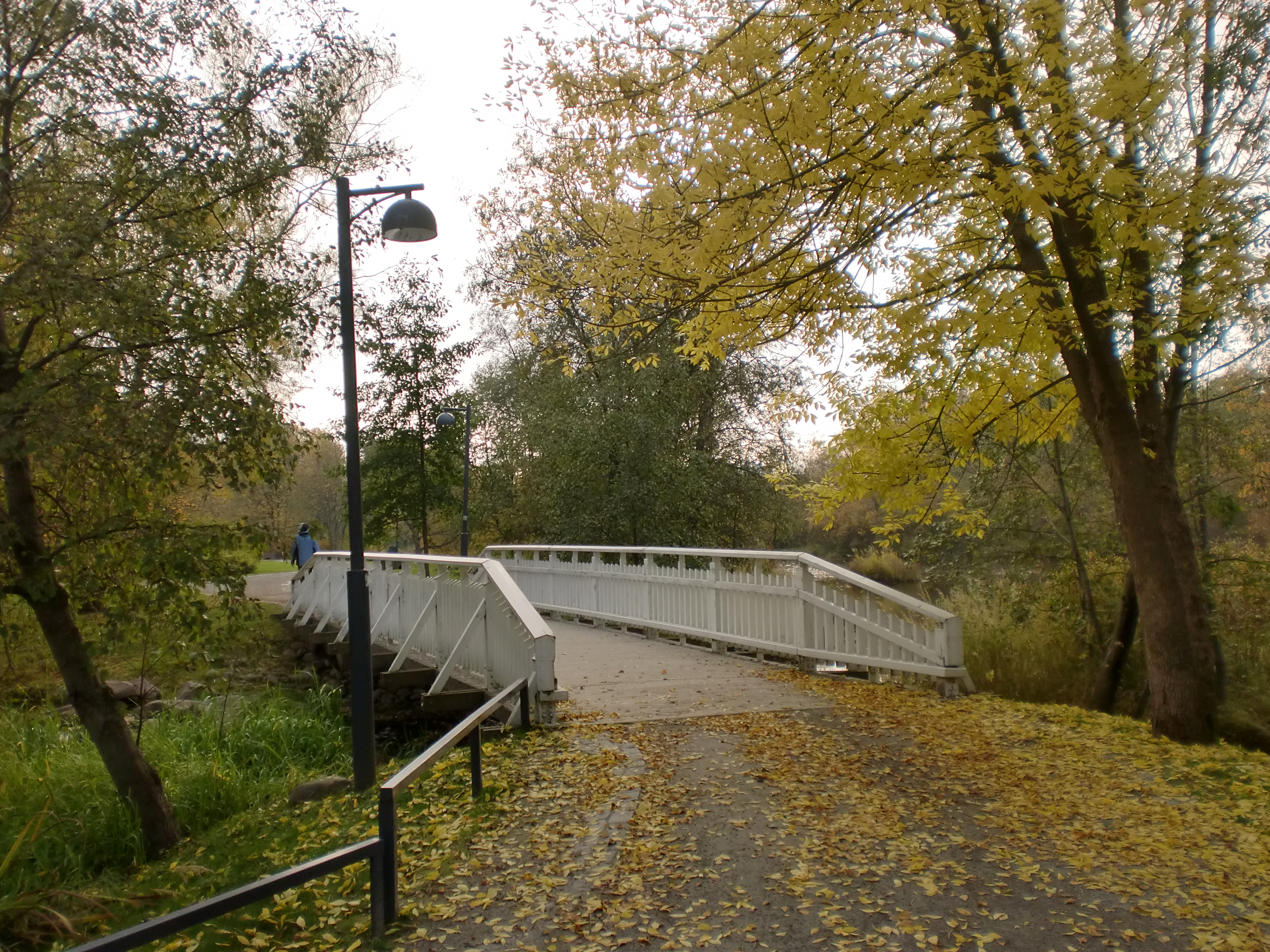
White wooden bridge on Hupisaaret

The Hupisaaret Islands City Park is a public urban park in the Myllytulli district in central Oulu, Finland. The park is located in the delta of the River Oulu. The area was built as a public park in the 1860s, and the first white wooden bridges that characterize the park were also built at the time.

Small brooks and waterways divide the park area into smaller and larger islands. Largest of the islands are Plaatansaari, Pakolansaari, Paratiisisaari, Kiikkusaari and Lasaretinsaari. The Hupisaaret name was previously used only for the group of numerous unnamed small islands in the northern part of the park, but later the whole park area was named after these islands.

The Northern Ostrobothnia museum has been located on the Pakolansaari island in the park since 1911. The first museum building, a national romantic villa, was built in 1888, but it was destroyed in a fire in 1929. The current building designed by architect Oiva Kallio has been completed in 1930.

University of Oulu Botanical Gardens were located on the Kiikkusaari island in the Hupisaaret park until 1983 before moving to the Linnanmaa campus. Nowadays the greenhouses are used by the environment department of the city. Also there is a café located in one of the greenhouses. There is a central playground on the Kiikkusaari island next to the greenhouses.

The Oulun Työväen Näyttämö (i.e. Oulu Workers' Theatre) has operated an open-air theatre in the Hupisaaret Islands since 1957. The current theatre building was built in 1987.
