= Robert Wilhelm Lagerborg =

Finnish politician (1796 – 1849)

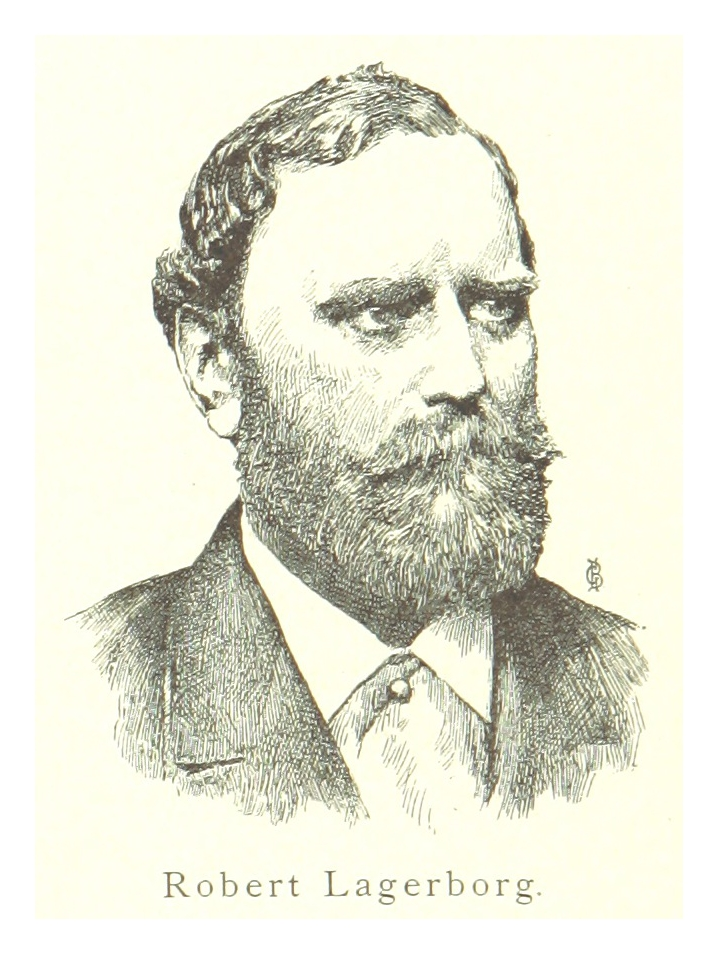
Portrait

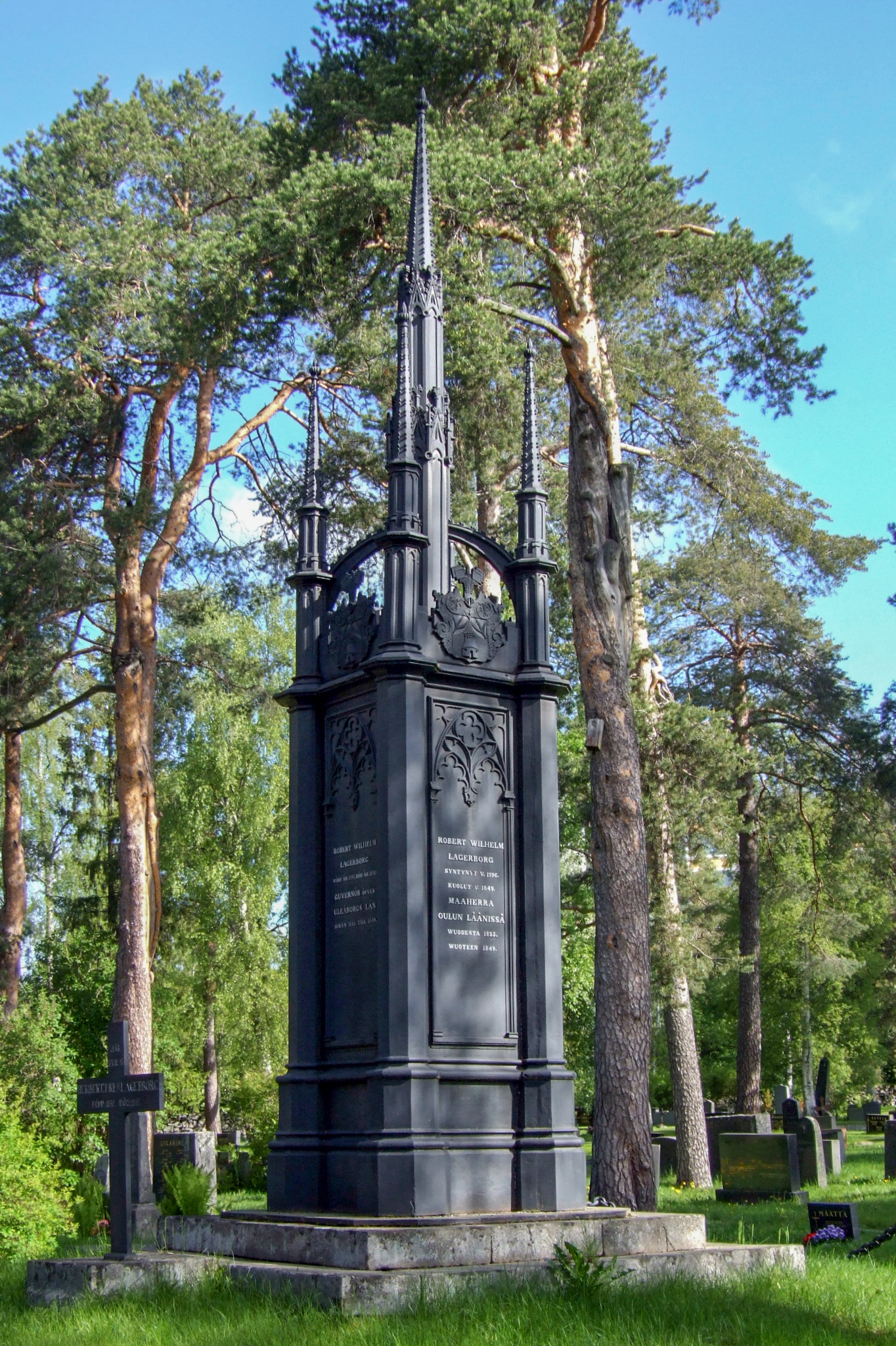
Oulu Cemetery Monument

Robert Wilhelm Lagerborg (1796 – 1849) was Governor of Oulu Province, Finland, from 1833 to his death in 1849.

Lagerborg was born in Tammela. The Lagerborg family name (registered at Suomen Ritarihuone as #105) originates in Värmland, Sweden, and has been known since the 16th century.

Lagerborg died in Oulu, and has a monument in the Oulu Cemetery, with inscriptions in Finnish and Swedish.

== Sources ==
- Suomen Ritarihuone
