= Intiö =

Coordinates: 65.0162°N 25.5000°E

- District of Oulu
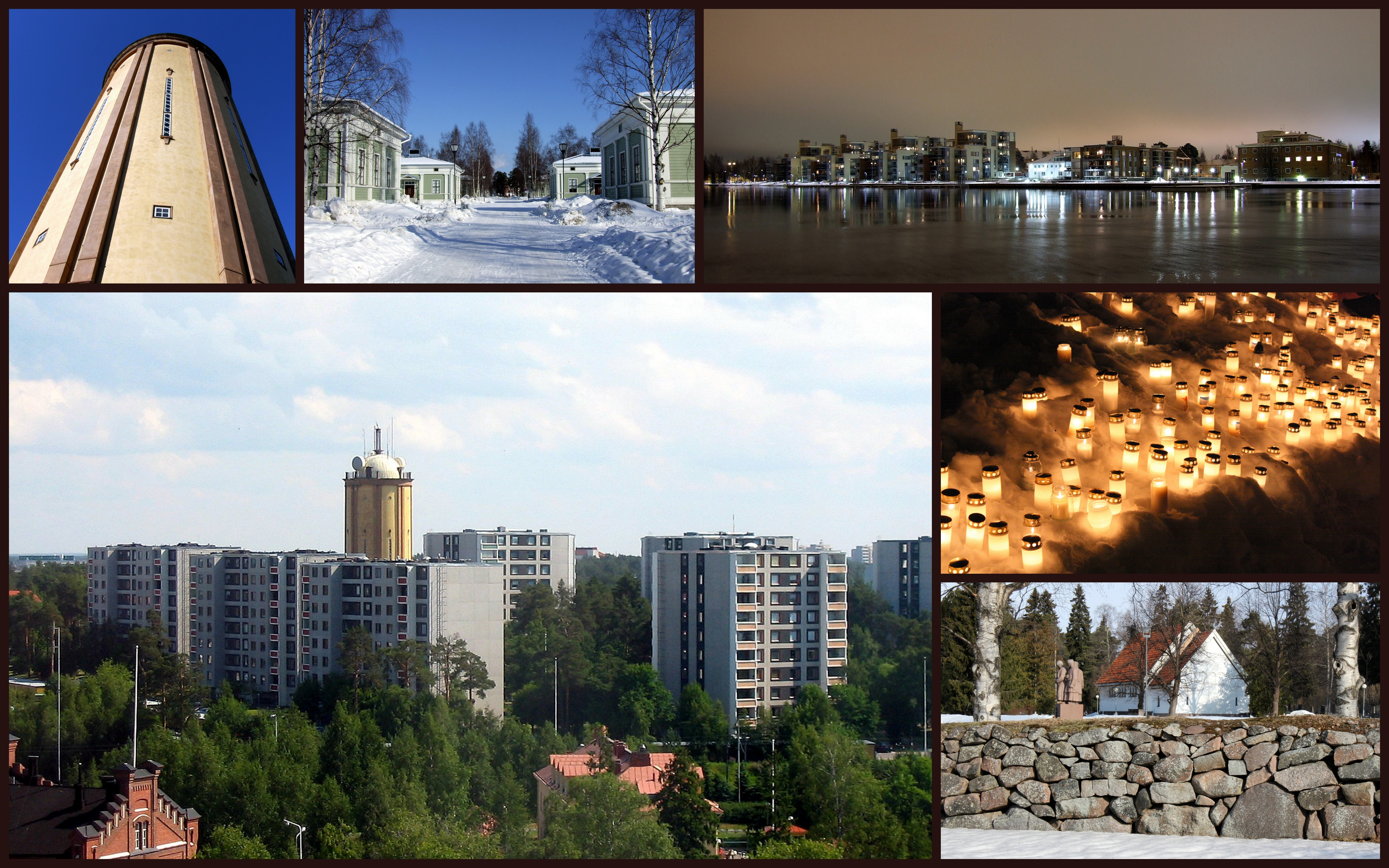
- Interactive map of Intiö
- Country: Finland
- City: Oulu
- Areas of Oulu: City Centre

Population (2013)
  - Total: 2 438
- Postal code: 90130

Intiö is a district of the city centre area of Oulu, Finland. It is located on the southern bank of the Oulu River in between Myllytulli and Värttö districts.

Most of the area in Intiö is taken by the old military barracks area, which is nowadays used by Luovi Vocational College, and the Oulu Cemetery. New apartment blocks have been built along the riverside. The Intiö water tower, designed by architect J. S. Sirén, is a prominent landmark of Intiö.
