= Yrjö Kallinen =

Finnish politician (1886–1976)

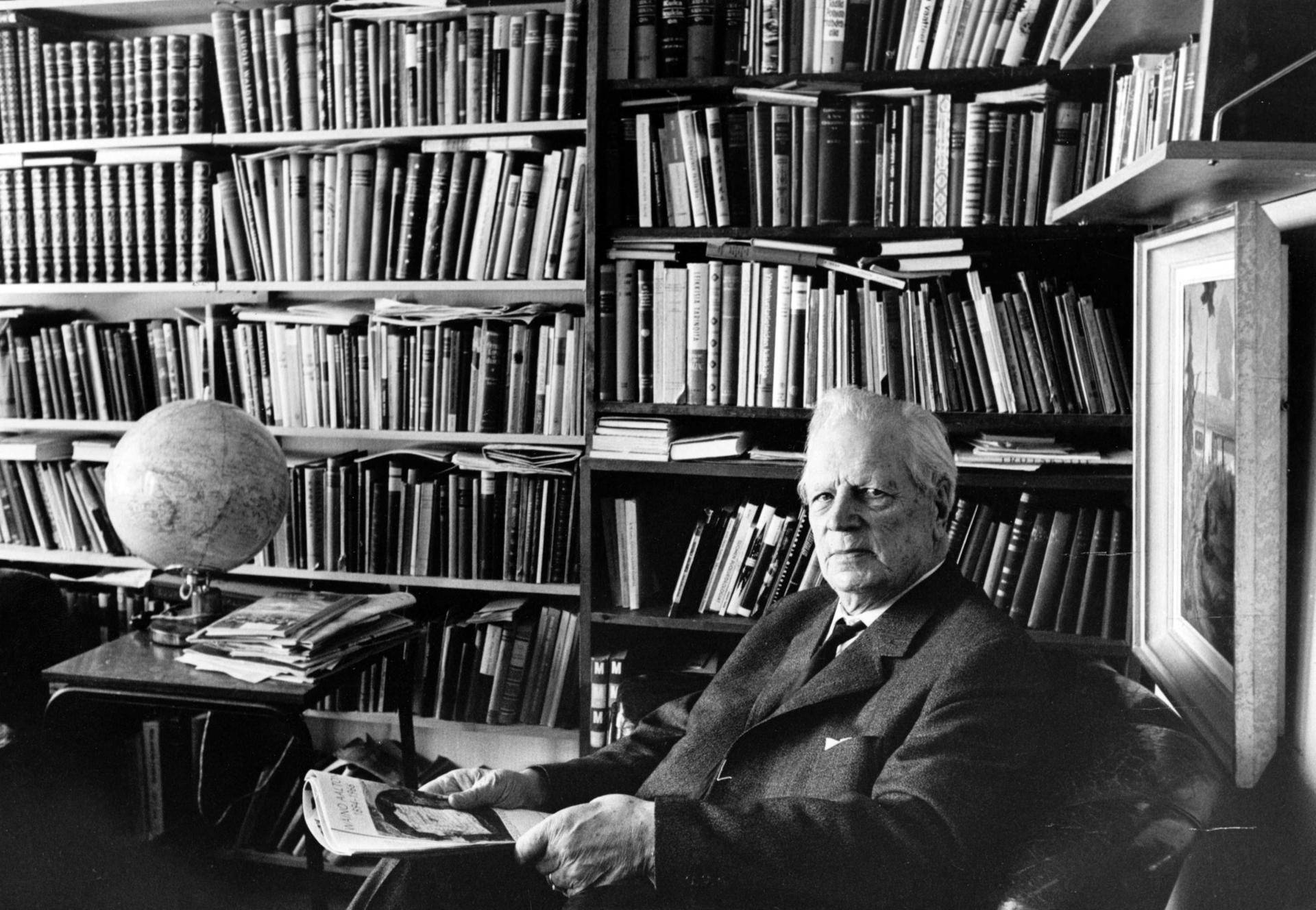
Yrjö Kallinen in 1966.

Yrjö Henrik Kallinen (15 June 1886 – 1 January 1976) was a Finnish railwayman, cooperative movement functionary and politician, born in Oulu. He was imprisoned from 1918 to 1921 for having sided with the Reds during the Finnish Civil War. Before he was finally imprisoned, he had four death sentences, but managed to be pardoned.

From 27 March 1946 to 29 July 1948, Kallinen served as Minister of Defence of Finland. He was a member of the Parliament of Finland from 1945 to 1948, representing the Social Democratic Party of Finland (SDP).
