= Pikisaari, Oulu =

Pikisaari
- District of Oulu
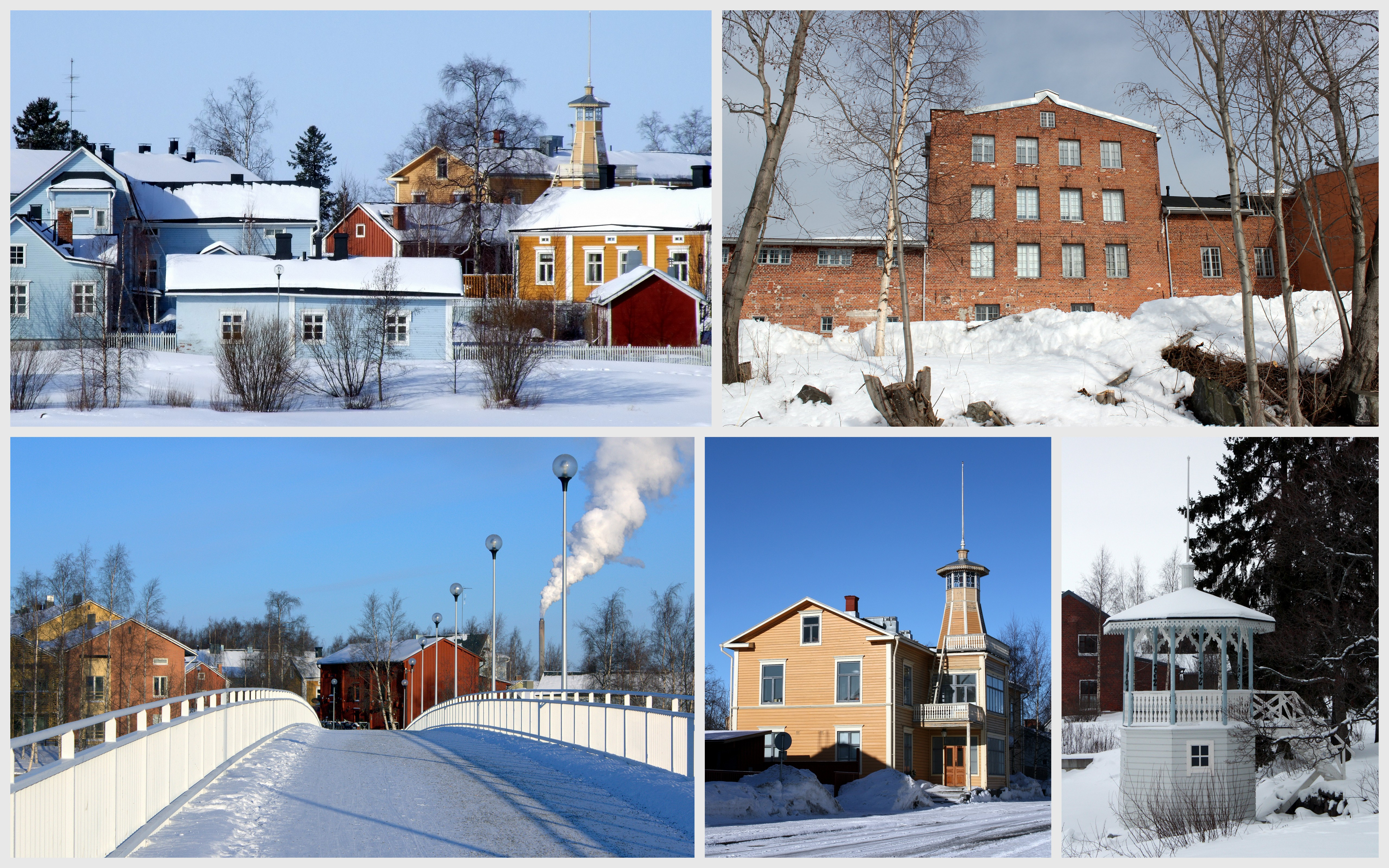
- Interactive map of Pikisaari
- Country: Finland
- City: Oulu
- Areas of Oulu: Tuira area

Population (2013)
  - Total: 156
- Postal code: 90100

Pikisaari (literally Pitch island in Finnish) is a district of the city of Oulu, Finland. The district consists of Pikisaari and Korkeasaari islands connected due to the post-glacial rebound. Pikisaari is located near the city centre in the estuary of Oulujoki River in between market square and Hietasaari island.

Pikisaari was named after the pitch distillery established in the 17th century. Due to its location many of the shipyards in Oulu area were located in the island. For centuries the island was used by different industries and the only inhabitants were the workers of the companies. During the Crimean War the island with its shipyards and other buildings was burned to the ground by the English.

Nowadays Pikisaari is a home for artists and craftsmen. At the end of 1970s the City of Oulu handed over the site of the former wool mill to the Arts and Crafts School of Oulu. In addition to the old wool mill buildings a new school building was completed in 1980. The school is now a unit of the Oulu Vocational College.
