= Linnanmaa =

- District of Oulu
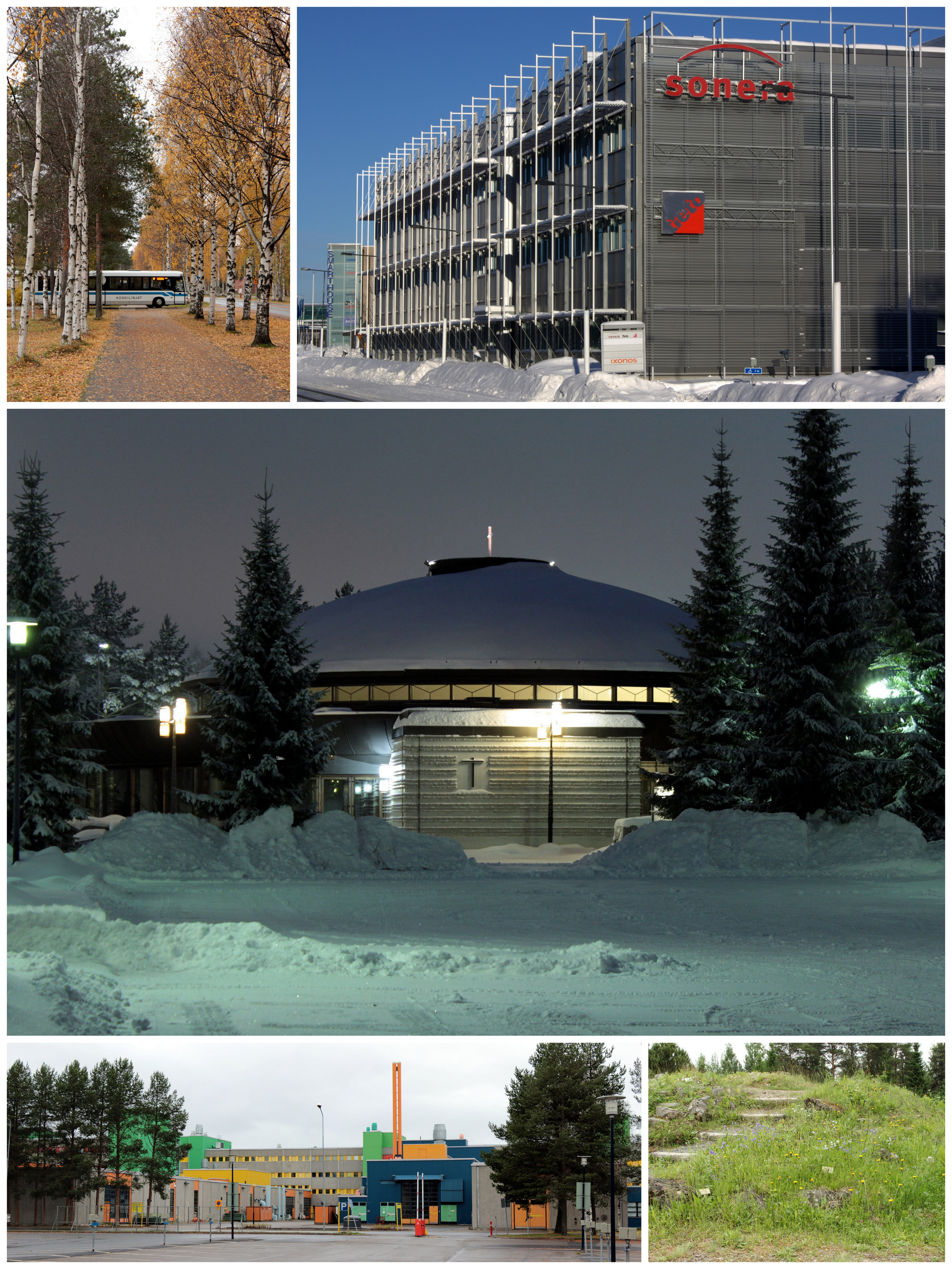
- Interactive map of Linnanmaa
- Country: Finland
- City: Oulu
- Areas of Oulu: Kaijonharju area

Population (2013)
  - Total: 2 845
- Postal code: 90570

Linnanmaa is a district of the Kaijonharju area of Oulu, Finland. The district is located about five kilometers north of the city centre.

The main campus of the University of Oulu is located in Linnanmaa occupying most of the area of the district. To the west of the campus lies the Technopolis science park which together with the university campus makes up a work and study community of about 20 000 people.

Church services in English are held at the St. Luke's Chapel in Linnanmaa.
