= Oulu Cemetery =

Cemetery in Intiö, Oulu, Finland

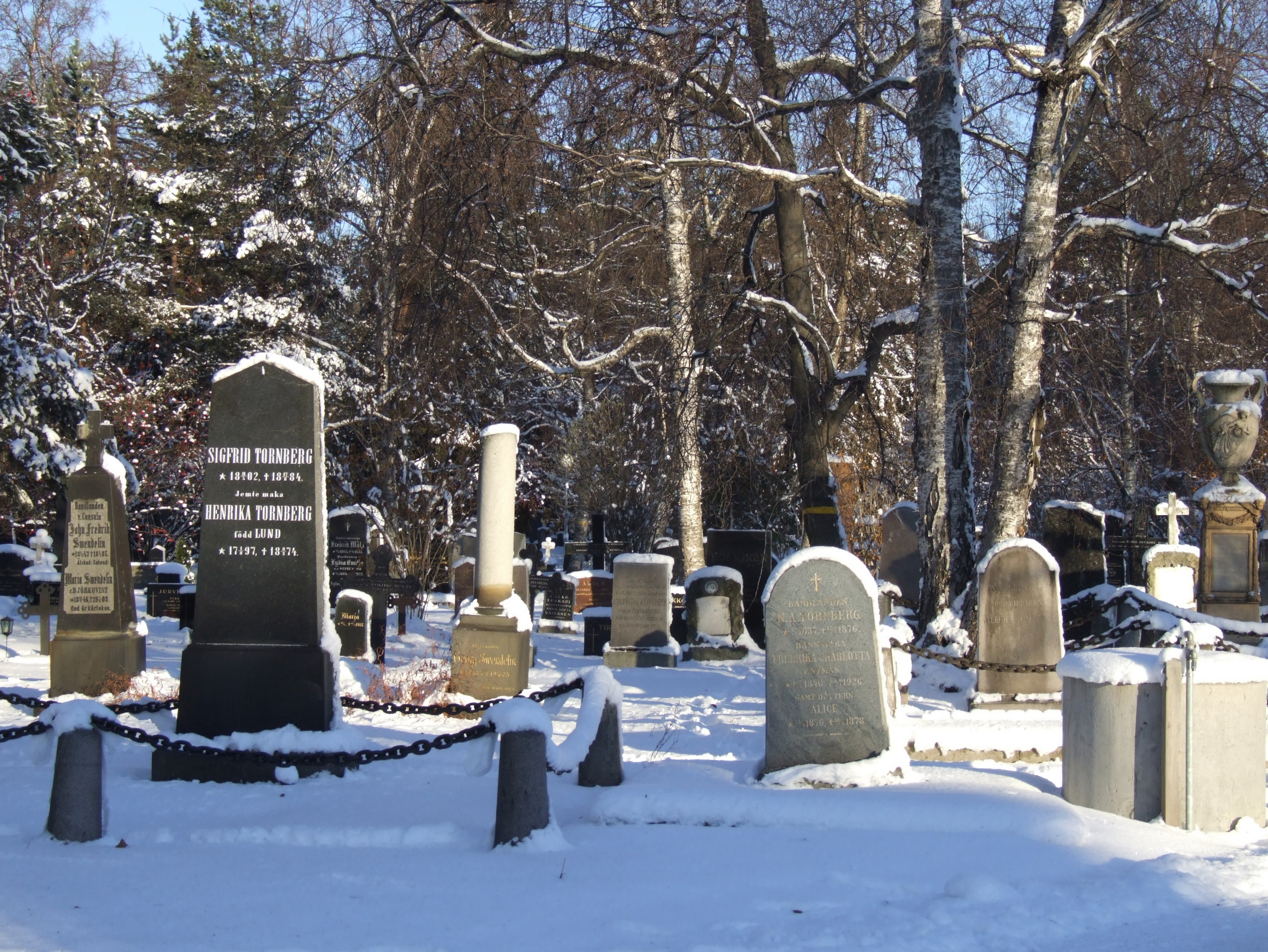
- Interactive map of Oulu Cemetery

Details
- Established: 1781
- Location: Intiö, Oulu
- Country: Finland
- Coordinates: 65°0′46″N 025°29′29″E
- Type: Public
- Owned by: Federation of Evangelical Lutheran Parishes in Oulu
- Size: 26.5 hectares (65 acres)
- Website: Oulun hautausmaa
- Find a Grave: Oulu Cemetery

The Oulu Cemetery (Finnish: Oulun hautausmaa) is a cemetery located in the Intiö district close to the city centre of Oulu, Finland.

The cemetery was inaugurated in 1781 by vicar Carl Henrik Ståhle. The cemetery was first known as Ståhleborg, after the vicar and the oldest section is still called by that name. There are two funeral chapels in the cemetery; the old chapel (designed by architect Otto F. Holm) was completed in 1923 and is located in the older section, while the new chapel (designed by architect Seppo Valjus) was built in 1972–1973. The crematory is located in the new chapel building.

The cemetery includes a military cemetery section for soldiers fallen in the Second World War. The war graves area with a war memorial was inaugurated in September 1952. The war memorial, The Battle Has Ended (Finnish: Taistelu on päättynyt), was created by sculptor Oskari Jauhiainen.

== Notable interments ==
- Otto Karhi (April 17, 1876, Oulu – June 7, 1966, Oulu)
- Robert Wilhelm Lagerborg (October 28, 1796, Tammela – March 28, 1849, Oulu)
- Yrjö Mäkelin (June 1, 1875 Tampere – September 18, 1923)
- Teuvo Pakkala (April 9, 1862, Oulu – May 17, 1925, Kuopio)
- Samuli Paulaharju (April 14, 1875, Kurikka – February 6, 1944, Oulu)
- Ensio Siilasvuo (January 1, 1922, Helsinki – January 10, 2003, Espoo)
- Hjalmar Siilasvuo (March 18, 1892, Helsinki – January 11, 1947, Oulu)
- Maria Silfvan (March 25, 1802, Turku – September 10, 1865, Oulu)
- Mikael Toppelius (August 10, 1734, Oulu – December 27, 1821, Oulu)
