= Myllytulli =

Coordinates: 65.0170°N 25.4837°E

- District of Oulu
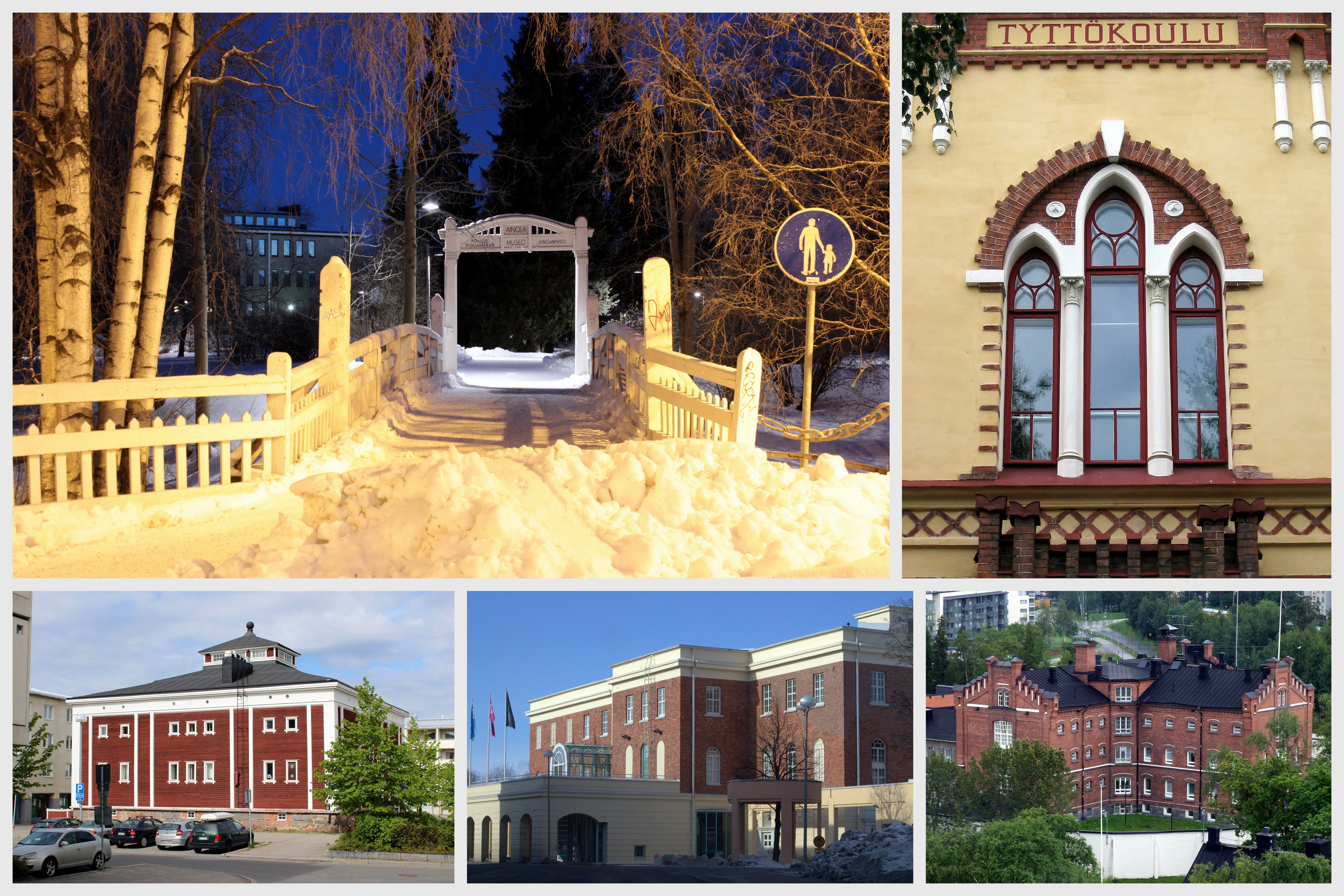
- Interactive map of Myllytulli
- Country: Finland
- City: Oulu
- Areas of Oulu: City Centre

Population (2013)
  - Total: 2 068
- Postal code: 90100

Myllytulli is a district of the city centre area of Oulu, Finland.

Myllytulli was mostly industrial area, which was rezoned mostly for residential use in 1984. Some of the old industrial buildings were preserved and renovated as museums such as Oulu Museum of Art, Tietomaa science centre, fire damaged Myllytulli power plant is being renovated as an art gallery. A large part of the neighbourhood is used by the Hupisaaret Islands park in the Oulu River delta. The Northern Ostrobothnia museum is located in the park.

Oulu Prison is located in Myllytulli.
