= Kivistö =

- City district
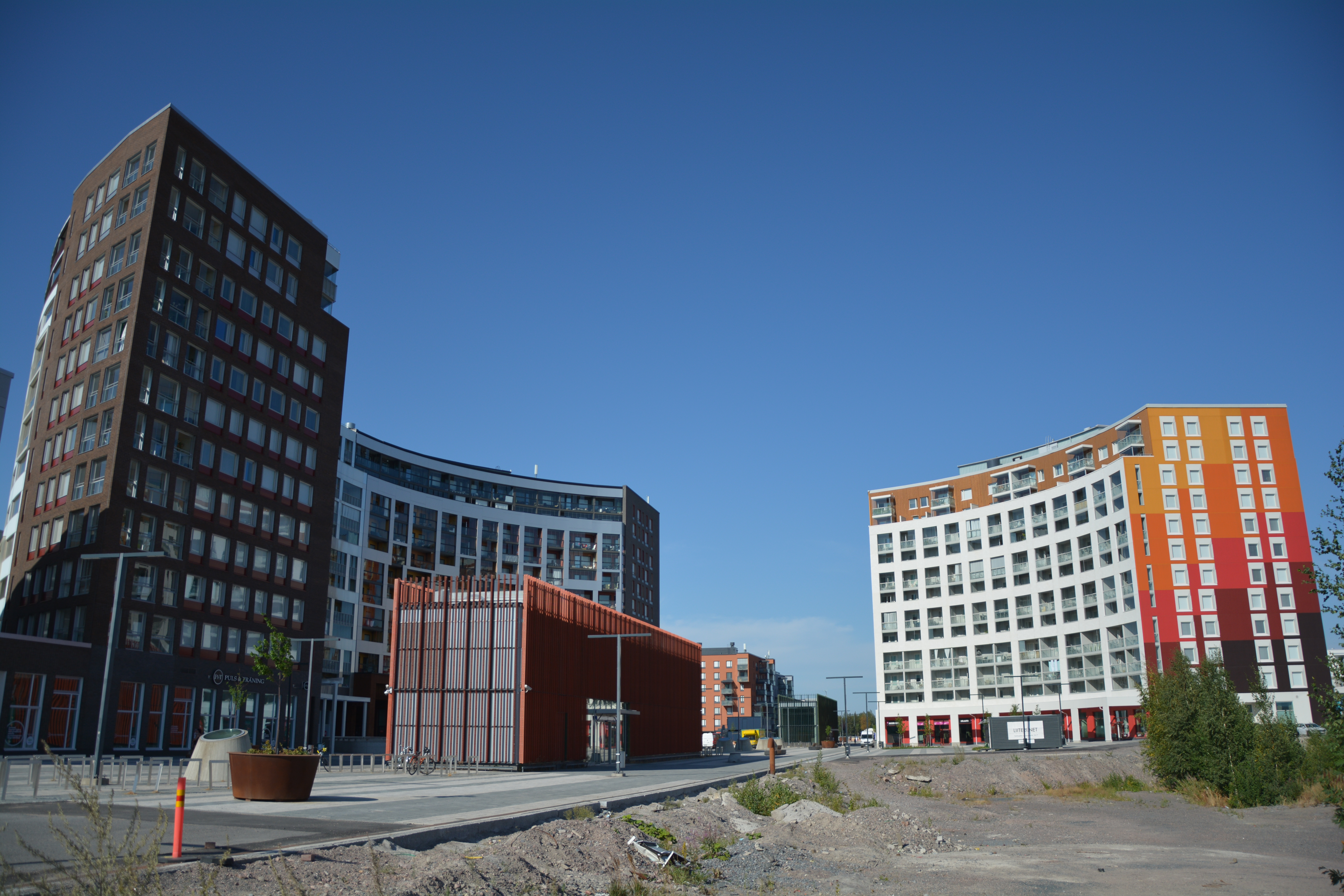
- Buildings of the Kivistö center in July 2021
- Etymology: Finnish: kivi ("stone", referring to inarable granite bedrock)
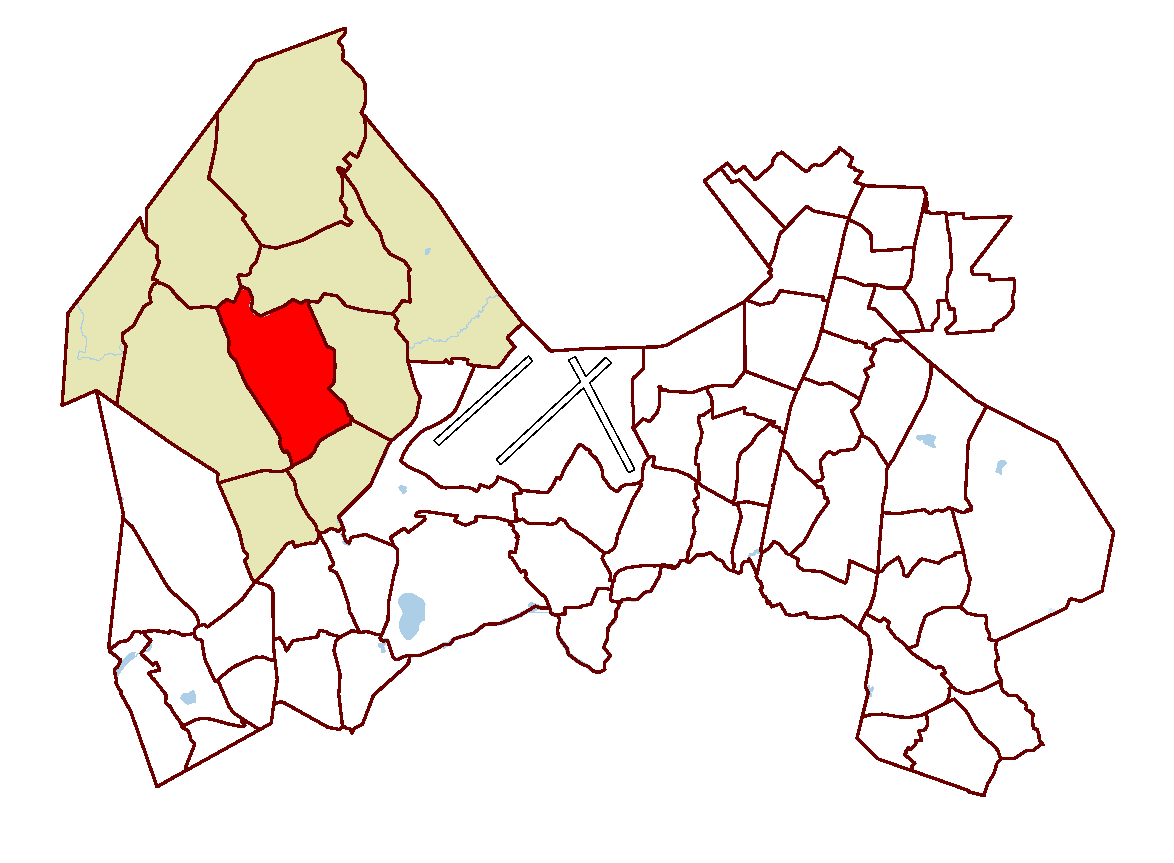
- Location on the map of Vantaa, with the district in red and the major region in light brown
- Coordinates: 60°19′25″N 24°50′43″E
- Country: Finland
- City: Vantaa
- Major region: Kivistö

Area
  - Total: 7.0 km^{2} (2.7 sq mi)
  - Major region: 71.5 km^{2} (27.6 sq mi)

Population (2021)
  - Total: 10,665
  - Density: 1,500/km^{2} (3,900/sq mi)
  - Major region: 17,410
  - Major region density: 243/km^{2} (631/sq mi)
- Time zone: GMT +2
- Postal Code(s): 01700
- Website: www.vantaa.fi/en/regions-and-districts/kivisto-major-region

Kivistö is a district and major region of the municipality of Vantaa, Finland, located within the northwestern part of the city. The district has a population of 10,665 and a population density of 1,520 inhabitants per square kilometre (3,900/sq mi).

The district is bordered to the west by Hämeenlinnanväylä (a constituent of the National road 3 (E12)), to the south by the district of Piispankylä, to the east by the district of Lapinkylä, and to the north by the districts of Seutula and Luhtaanmäki.

The Kivistö major region consists of ten districts: the central Kivistö, Lapinkylä, Seutula, Piispankylä, Riipilä, Kiila, Vestra, Luhtaanmäki, Keimola and Myllymäki. As of December 2021, the Kivistö major region has a total population of 17,410 and a population density of 240 inhabitants per square kilometre (620/sq mi). The Kivistö major region is the least populated—and the least densely populated—major region in Vantaa.

== History ==
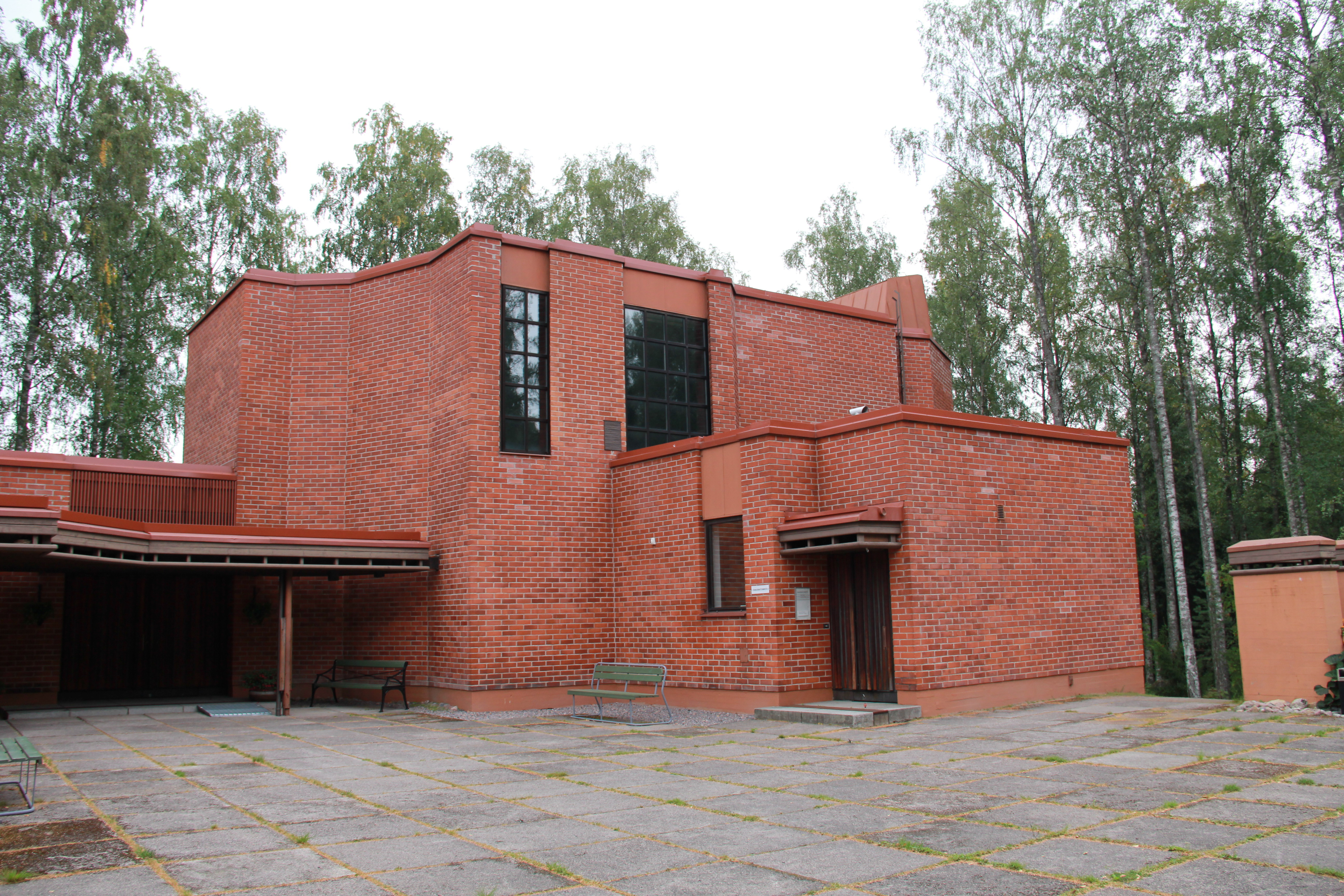
The main church of Kivistö

The earliest evidence of settlement in the area dates back to the early 16th century. The original inhabitants of the area are believed to have spoken Finnish, which was unique for the time. The name "Kivistö" was coined by them, and it is thought to be in reference to the inarable exposed granite bedrock common to the area. The existing farmland in Kivistö has been in use since the 17th century, during which time the Linna Manor was constructed there.

The first of the contemporary housing in the area was built in the early 1950s. The land was primarily sold by the construction firm Omakiinteistö Oy, and settlers were unaware of a nearby radio station, which handled the Finnish government's international shortwave radio communications. Due to radio-frequency interference, the construction of electrical infrastructure in the area was banned, and the district spent its first years without electricity. After three years of complaints and protests, the ban was lifted, and Kivistö was permitted electrical power. Protests included the construction of a roadside sign leading into the district that read: "Öljylamppukylä—jo 3 vuotta n. 200 taloa ilman sähköä" or "Oil Lamp Town—already 3 years of about 200 houses without electricity".

== Amenities ==
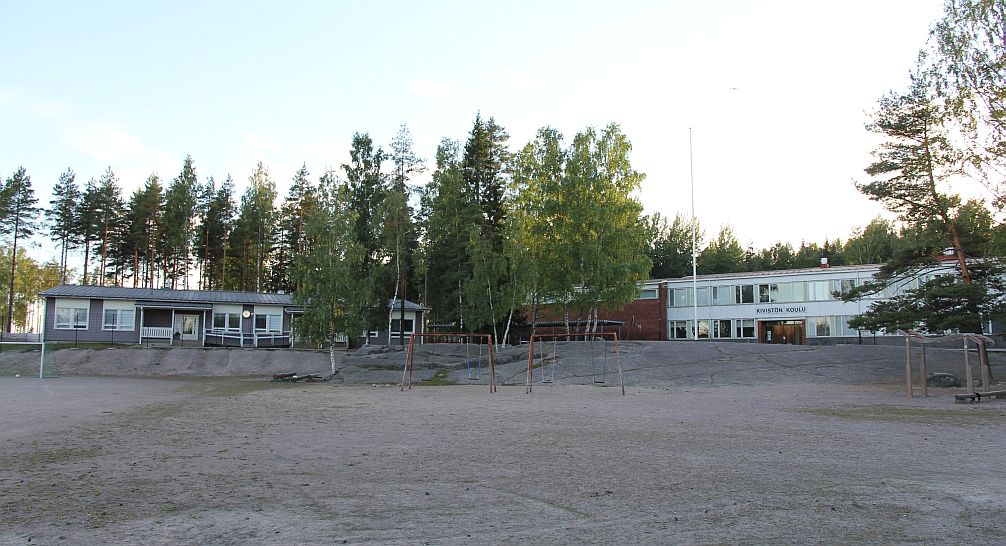
The Kivistö school

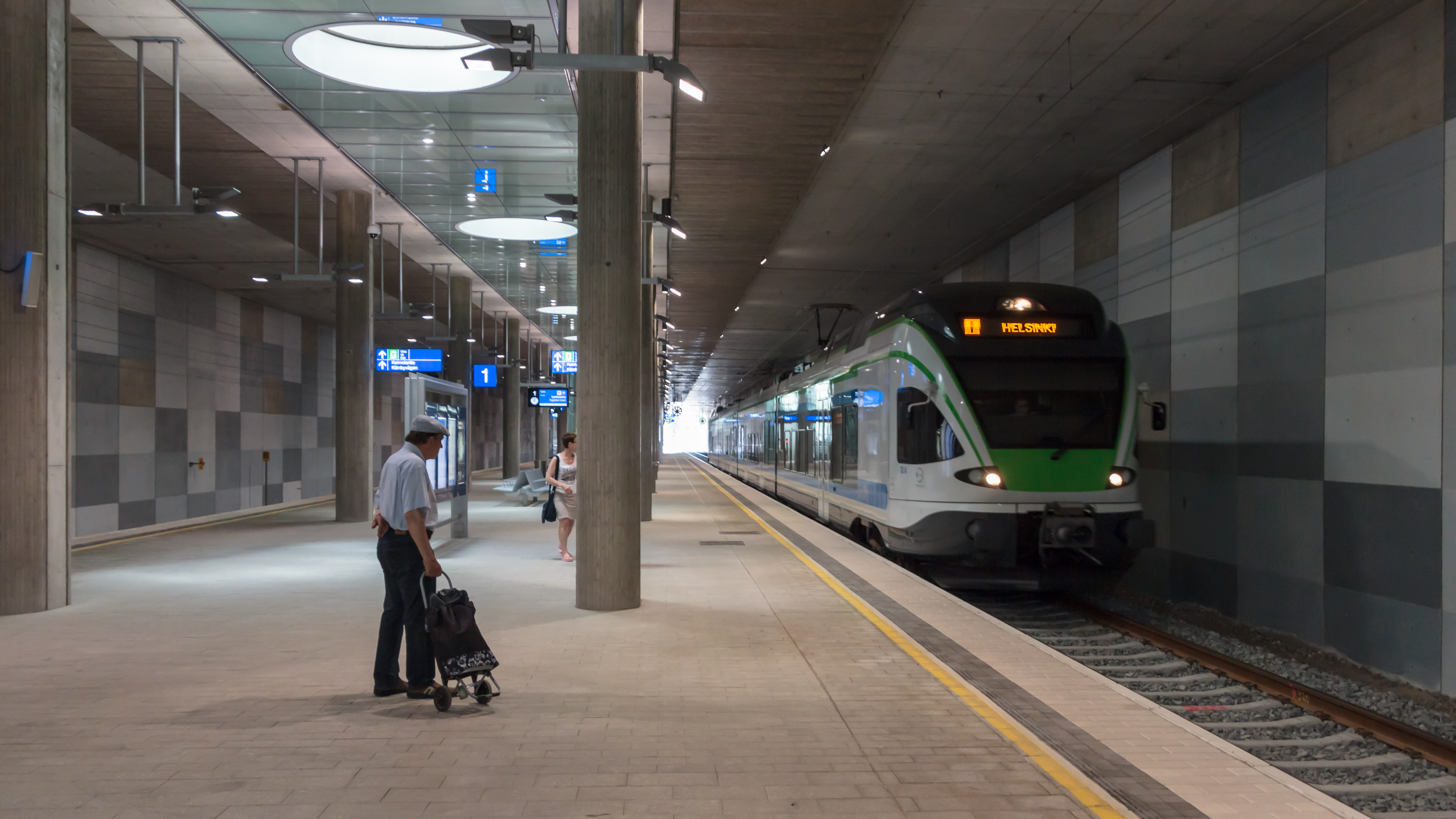
Kivistö railway station

Kivistö has its two public schools, five day care businesses, and a nursing home specializing in dementia care.

In 2015, the Kivistö railway station was opened as a part of the Ring Rail Line. The rail connects Kivistö to downtown Helsinki, as well as Helsinki Airport and Tikkurila.
