= Luhtaanmäki =

Luhtaanmäki Luhtabacka
- City District
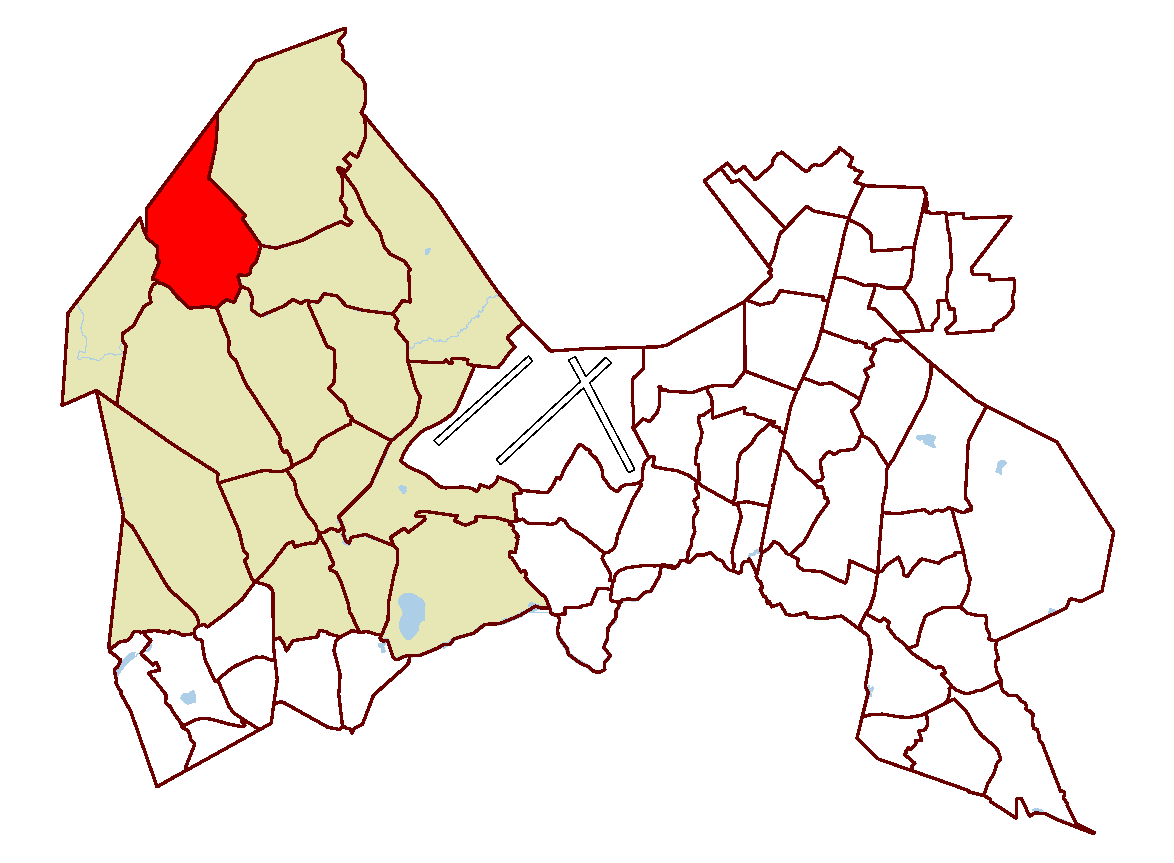
- Location on the map of Vantaa
- Country: Finland
- Municipality: Vantaa

Population (1.1.2015)
  - Total: 291
- Time zone: GMT +2
- Postal Code(s): 01750 (Keimola), 01800 (Klaukkala)
- Website: Vantaan kaupunki - Luhtaanmäki ja Vestra

Luhtaanmäki (Swedish: Luhtabacka) is a district in Vantaa, Finland. It is located in the northwestern part of the Kivistö area, close to the border of Nurmijärvi municipality and its largest village, Klaukkala. On the Vantaa side, the neighboring districts are Riipilä, Seutula, Kivistö, Keimola and Vestra.

Luhtaanmäki rises from the Valley of River Vantaa in a sparsely populated rural area. The beautiful profile of Luhtaanmäki with its old buildings is drawn in the middle of a riverbed and rolling fields. There are still several buildings of cultural and historical value in Luhtaanmäki, such as the exceptionally large military office of Grips from the 1860s. An old and handsome arched stone bridge, which is no longer used in road traffic, crosses the river called Luhtaanmäenjoki between Luhtaanmäki and Keimola. The protected cultural landscape of the River Vantaa is partly located in the Luhtaanmäki district, where Luhtaanmäenjoki joins the main riverbank of River Vantaa.
