= Kivistö railway station =

Railway station in Vantaa, Finland

Kivistö
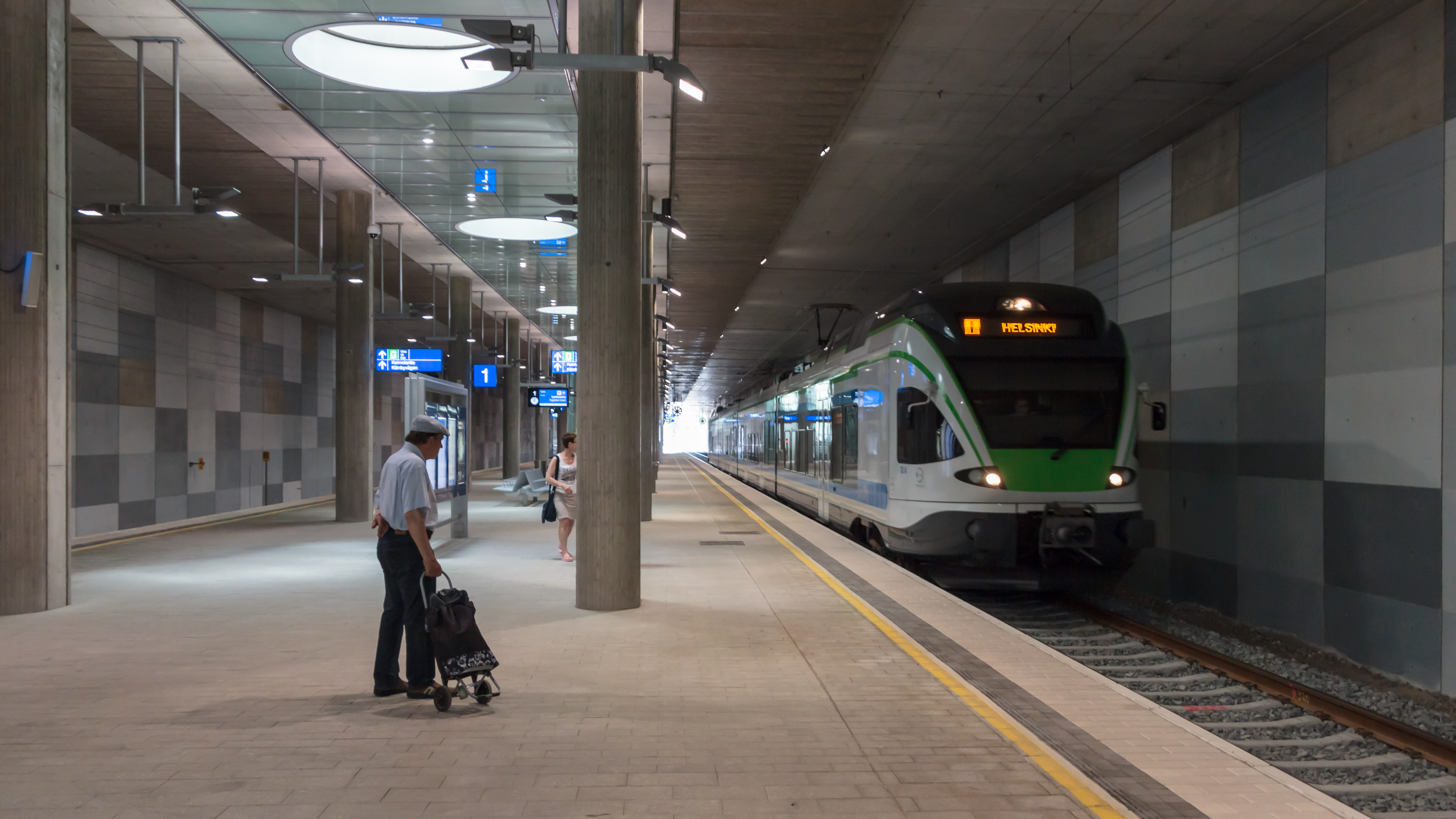

General information
- Location: Keimolantie 10, 01700; Kivistö, Vantaa, Uusimaa; Finland
- Coordinates: 60.3140°N 24.8458°E
- System: Helsinki commuter rail station
- Owner: City of Vantaa
- Line: Ring Rail Line
- Platforms: 1 island platform
- Tracks: 2
- Train operators: VR on behalf of HSL

Construction
- Structure type: ground station

Other information
- Station code: Ktö
- Fare zone: C

History
- Opened: 1 July 2015

Passengers
- 2019: 2,211,304

Services
Preceding station	Helsinki commuter rail	Following station
Aviapolis One-way operation	I counterclockwise via Tikkurila	Vehkala towards Helsinki
Vehkala One-way operation	P clockwise via Myyrmäki	Aviapolis towards Helsinki via Airport
Location

Kivistö railway station (Finnish: Kivistön rautatieasema, Swedish: Kivistö järnvägsstation) is a Helsinki commuter rail station in the district of Kivistö in Vantaa, Finland.

It is a station of the Ring Rail Line (Kehärata), which opened in July 2015. The station is located between the stations of Vehkala and Aviapolis.
