= Koivukylä =

Koivukylä Björkby
- City District
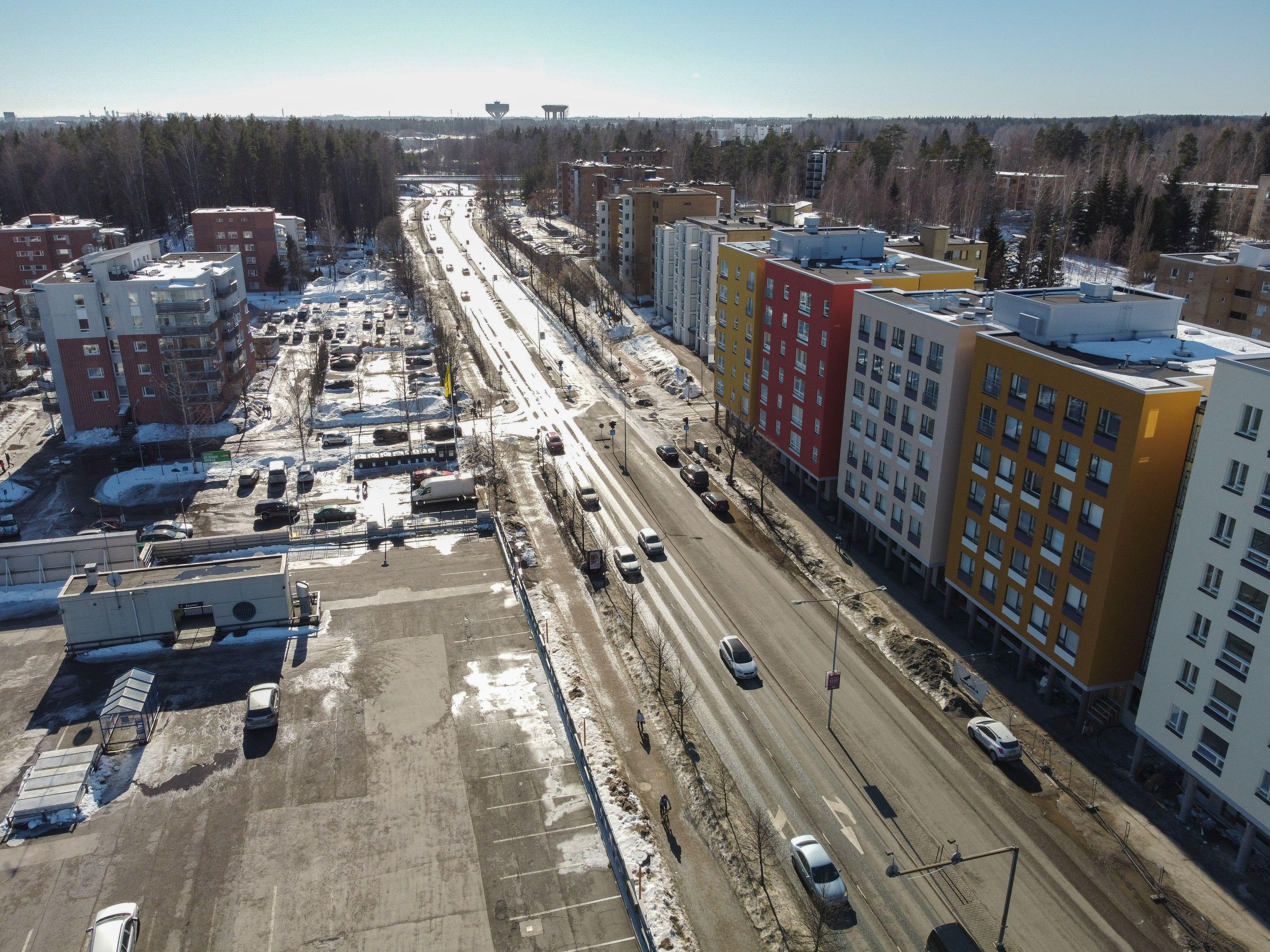
- Asolanväylä, the main street in the area

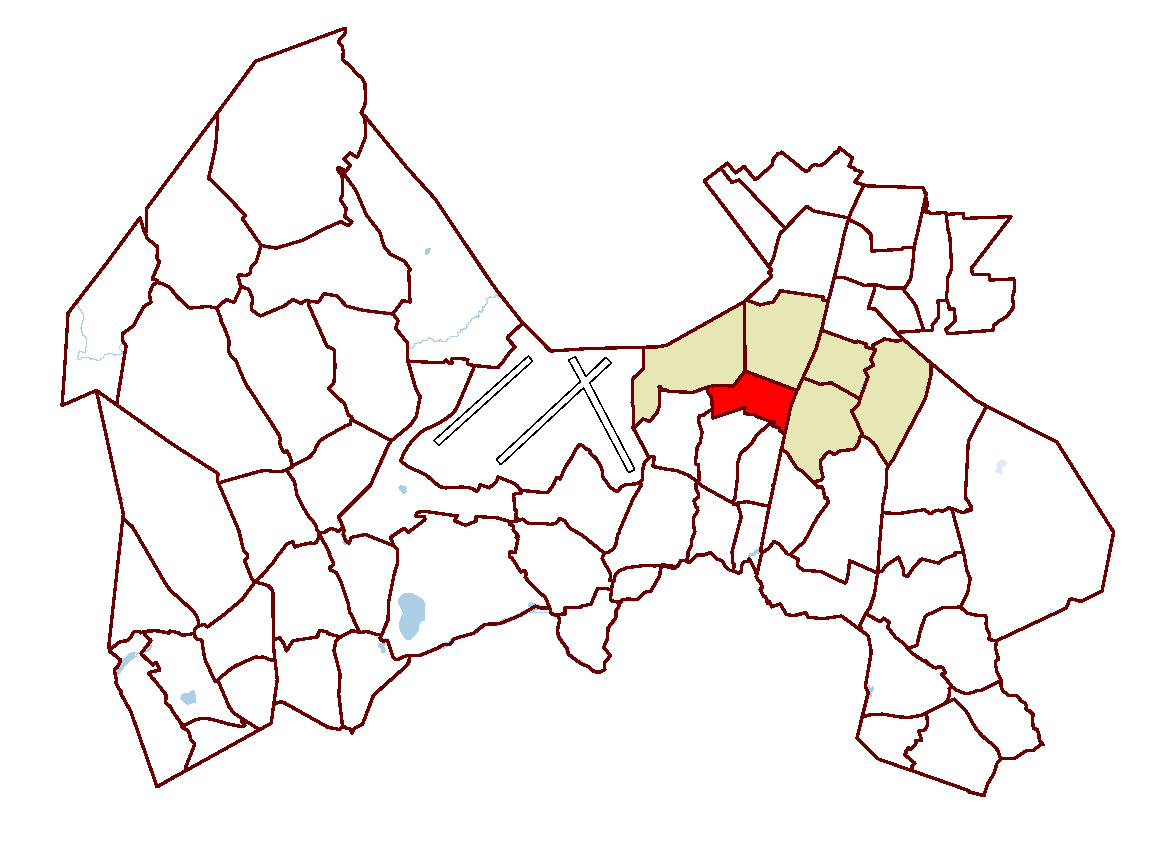
- Location on the map of Vantaa, with the district in red and the major region in light brown
- Coordinates: 60°19′25″N 25°03′36″E
- Country: Finland
- City: Vantaa
- Major region: Koivukylä

Area
  - Total: 1.6 km^{2} (0.62 sq mi)
  - Major region: 16.7 km^{2} (6.4 sq mi)

Population (1.1.2014)
  - Total: 3,263
  - Density: 2,000/km^{2} (5,300/sq mi)
  - Major region: 26,772
  - Major region density: 1,600/km^{2} (4,150/sq mi)
- Time zone: GMT +2
- Postal Code(s): 01360, 01361
- Website: www.vantaa.fi/frontpage/

Koivukylä (Swedish: Björkby; lit. 'birch village') is a district and major region of the municipality of Vantaa, Finland. The district hosts a multitude of services, such as several stores and a library. It has its own railway station, the Koivukylä railway station, which serves commuter trains around Greater Helsinki.

The Koivukylä major region consists of six districts: Havukoski, Ilola, Päiväkumpu, Asola, the central Koivukylä, and Rekola. As of January 2014, the Koivukylä major region has a total population of 26,772 and a population density of 1,600 inhabitants per square kilometre (4,100/sq mi). The main hospital of Vantaa, Peijas Hospital, is located in the major region, in Asola.

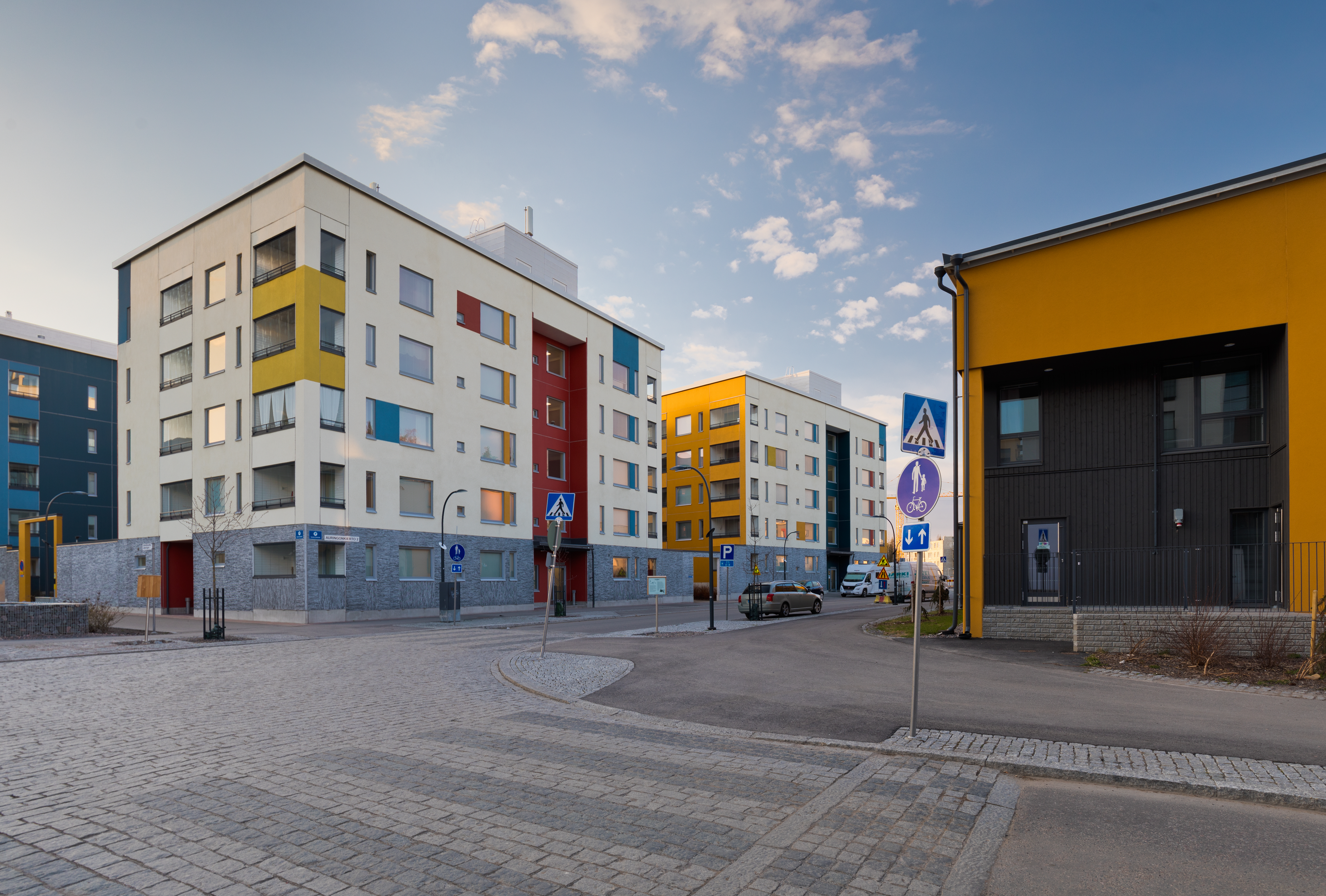
Leinelä, a residential area established in the 2010s.

== Transport ==
Koivykylä has the following public transportation access:

- Koivukylä railway station:
  - K-trains to Helsinki and Kerava
  - T-train during night hours
- Bus lines:
  - To Helsinki (623, 721)
  - To Tikkurila (624, 631)
  - To Ilola (624)
  - To Peijas Hospital (623, 625)
  - To Korso (587, 631)
  - To Hakunila and Mellunmäki metro station (587)
- Leinelä railway station:
  - P-trains to Helsinki-Vantaa Airport, Myyrmäki and Helsinki
  - I-train to Tikkurila and Helsinki
