= Vehkala railway station =

Railway station in Vantaa, Finland

Vehkala Veckal
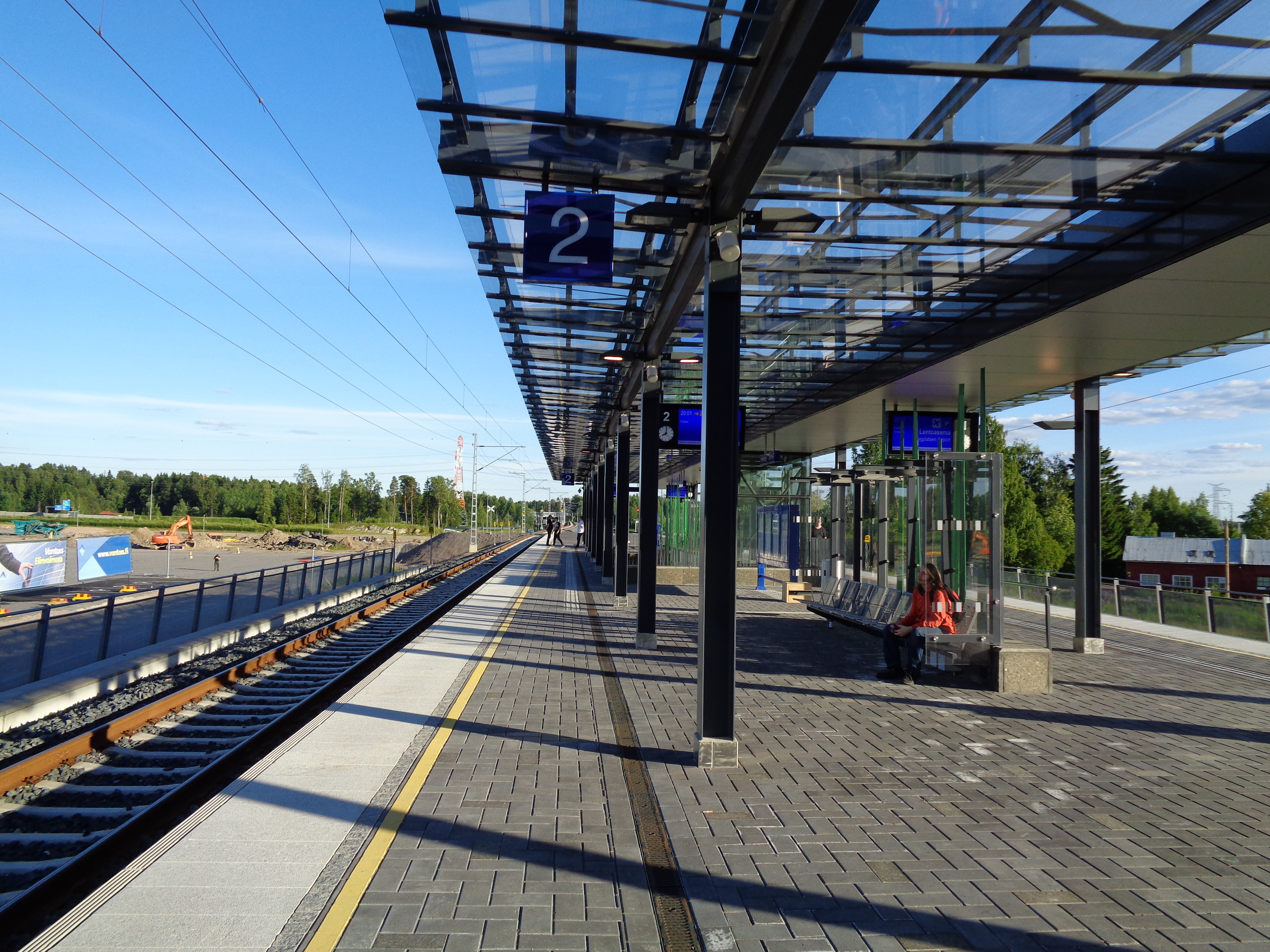

General information
- Location: Härkähaantie 13, 01730; Myllymäki, Vantaa, Uusimaa; Finland
- Coordinates: 60°17′42″N 24°50′38″E
- System: Helsinki commuter rail station
- Owner: City of Vantaa
- Line: Ring Rail Line
- Platforms: 1 island platform
- Tracks: 2
- Train operators: VR on behalf of HSL
- Connections: 433

Construction
- Structure type: ground station

Other information
- Station code: Veh
- Fare zone: C

History
- Opened: 1 July 2015

Passengers
- 2019: 271,626

Services
Preceding station	Helsinki commuter rail	Following station
Kivistö One-way operation	I counterclockwise via Tikkurila	Vantaankoski towards Helsinki
Vantaankoski One-way operation	P clockwise via Myyrmäki	Kivistö towards Helsinki via Airport
Location

Vehkala railway station (Finnish: Vehkalan rautatieasema, Swedish: Veckals järnvägsstation) is a Helsinki commuter rail station located in the district of Myllymäki in Vantaa, Finland.

It is one of the new stations of the Ring Rail Line (Kehärata), which opened in July 2015. The station is located between the stations of Vantaankoski and Kivistö.
