= Tikkurila Upper Secondary =

Tikkurila Upper Secondary School
- Tikkurilan lukio
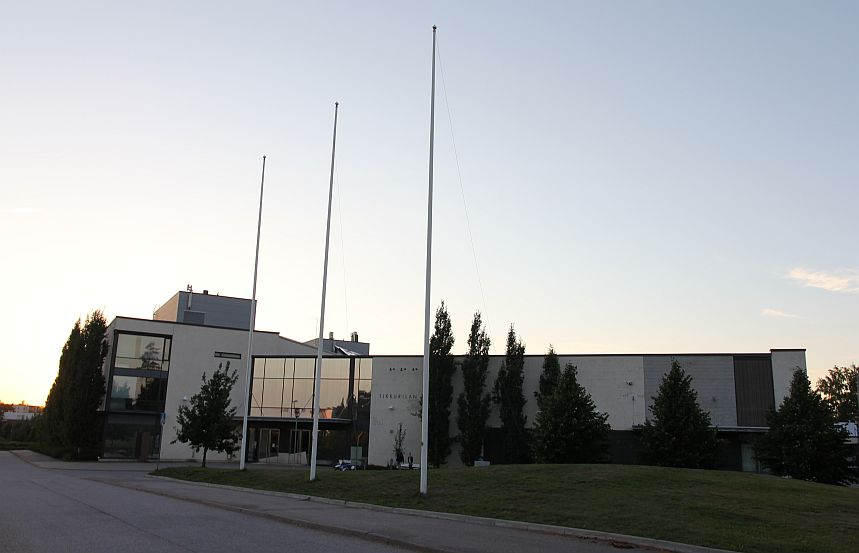

Location
- Valkoisenlähteentie 53; Vantaa, Uusimaa; Finland; 60°17′56″N 25°03′01″E

Information
- Type: Upper Secondary School
- Principal: Marianna Sydänmaanlakka
- Enrollment: about 1200
- Nickname: TILU/ TILU IB
- Website: http://www.edu.vantaa.fi/tilu/

Tikkurila Upper Secondary School (Finnish: Tikkurilan lukio), abbreviated in Finnish as TILU, is the largest high school in Finland, with about 1200 students from grades 10 to 12. The school also offer an IB programme which is greatly valued in all around the world. The school is located in Tikkurila, Vantaa, and is approximately 430 metres (1,411 ft) from Hiekkaharju's station. In 2018, junior high school graduates needed a minimum of 8.10 GPA to be admitted to study at Tikkurila Upper Secondary.

In 2023, 372 students applied to the Tikkurila IB High School, which offers 30 spots. The acceptance ratio for Tikkurila IB High School in 2023 is approximately 8.06% (comp. Ressu IB 17.88%).

TILU classifies its courses into different class groups that focus on specific subjects. Since 2009 there has been a mathematics and physical education group, in addition to a music group. The school also provides a variety of media and different languages courses including Latin and Japanese. TILU's friend-school is in Singapore and the schools arrange visits to one another's schools annually.

Tilu's principal is Marianna Sydänmaanlakka.

== International Baccalaureate ==
In addition to the typical Finnish curriculum, TILU offers the International Baccalaureate Diploma Programme, with about ninety students in the school. TILU IB offers a wide range of subjects for students with different aims and goals. In TILU, the IB subject choices are:

- Group 1 - English A1/Finnish A1
- Group 2 - English B/Finnish B
- Group 3 - History/Philosophy/Psychology
- Group 4 - Biology/Chemistry; Physics (SL only)
- Group 5 - Mathematics HL/SL/studies SL
- Group 6 - Visual arts/additional subject from groups 3-4

In addition, the school also has a personal library for students to use.
