= Ring Rail Line =

Railway line in Vantaa, Finland

- The Ring Rail Line. Dashed line indicates tunnel.

Overview
- Locale: Vantaa, Southern Finland
- Termini: Vantaankoski; Merges with Main line (local tracks) between Hiekkaharju and Koivukylä stations
- Stations: 5 (+ 3)

History
- Opened: 1 July 2015

Technical
- Line length: 18 km (11 mi)
- Number of tracks: Double track
- Track gauge: 1,524 mm (5 ft)
- Electrification: 25 kV @ 50 Hz
- Operating speed: 120 km/h (75 mph)
Route map

The Ring Rail Line (Finnish: Kehärata, Swedish: Ringbanan; formerly Marjarata) is a railway route in the area of the city of Vantaa, in the Greater Helsinki Metropolitan Area of Finland. It connects Helsinki-Vantaa Airport and the adjacent Aviapolis business and retail district to the Helsinki commuter rail network. The line fills the gap between Vantaankoski and Tikkurila railway stations, travelling in tunnel underneath the airport.

The line started operating on 1 July 2015.

== History ==
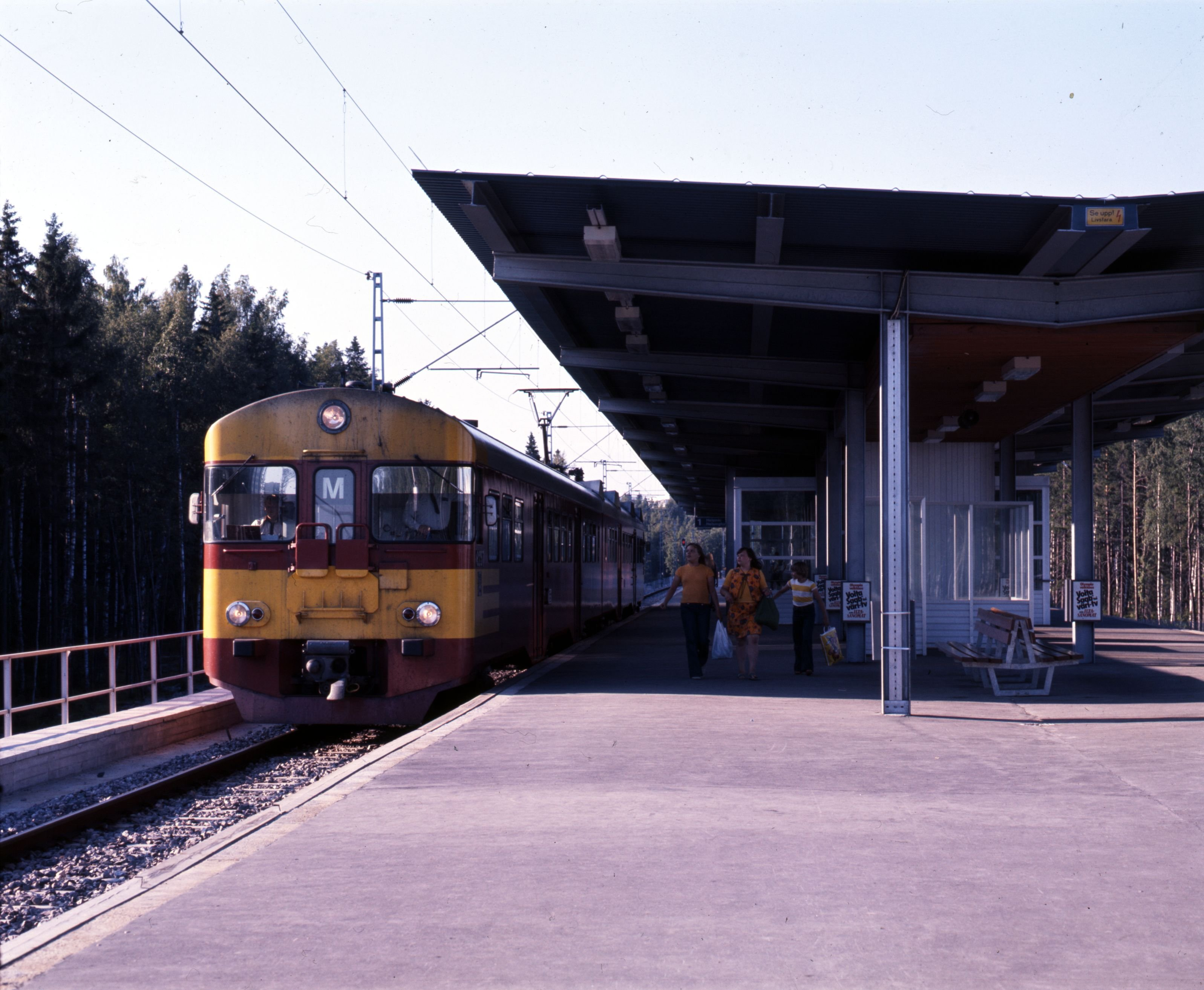
A commuter train on line M at the Louhela railway station in the 1970s. The last commuter train on line M travelled on the rail on 30 June 2015, one day before the Ring Rail Line opened.

The founding stone of the line was laid on 3 March 2009, and construction was started on 13 May 2009 with the excavation of service tunnels. The excavation of a 300 m-long (980 ft) tunnel station under the airport was completed in March 2010, as the construction was proceeding on schedule.

In February 2011, a video on the project's official website stated that the project would be open by June 2014. It announced various new details, including that the station at Tikkurila would be entirely rebuilt as an integrated travel centre, as well as details on the trains that would serve the airport. In September 2012, the opening date was pushed back to July 2015, due to the unexpected need to re-design and reinforce the airport station tunnel to withstand the acidic products of propylene glycol decay by bacteria within the ground. Propylene glycol is used as a de-icing agent for the planes.

The Ring Rail Line started operating on 1 July 2015. The station at the Helsinki Airport opened later, with the Tietotie entrance opening on 10 July and the direct connection to the terminal opening in December 2015.

== Route ==
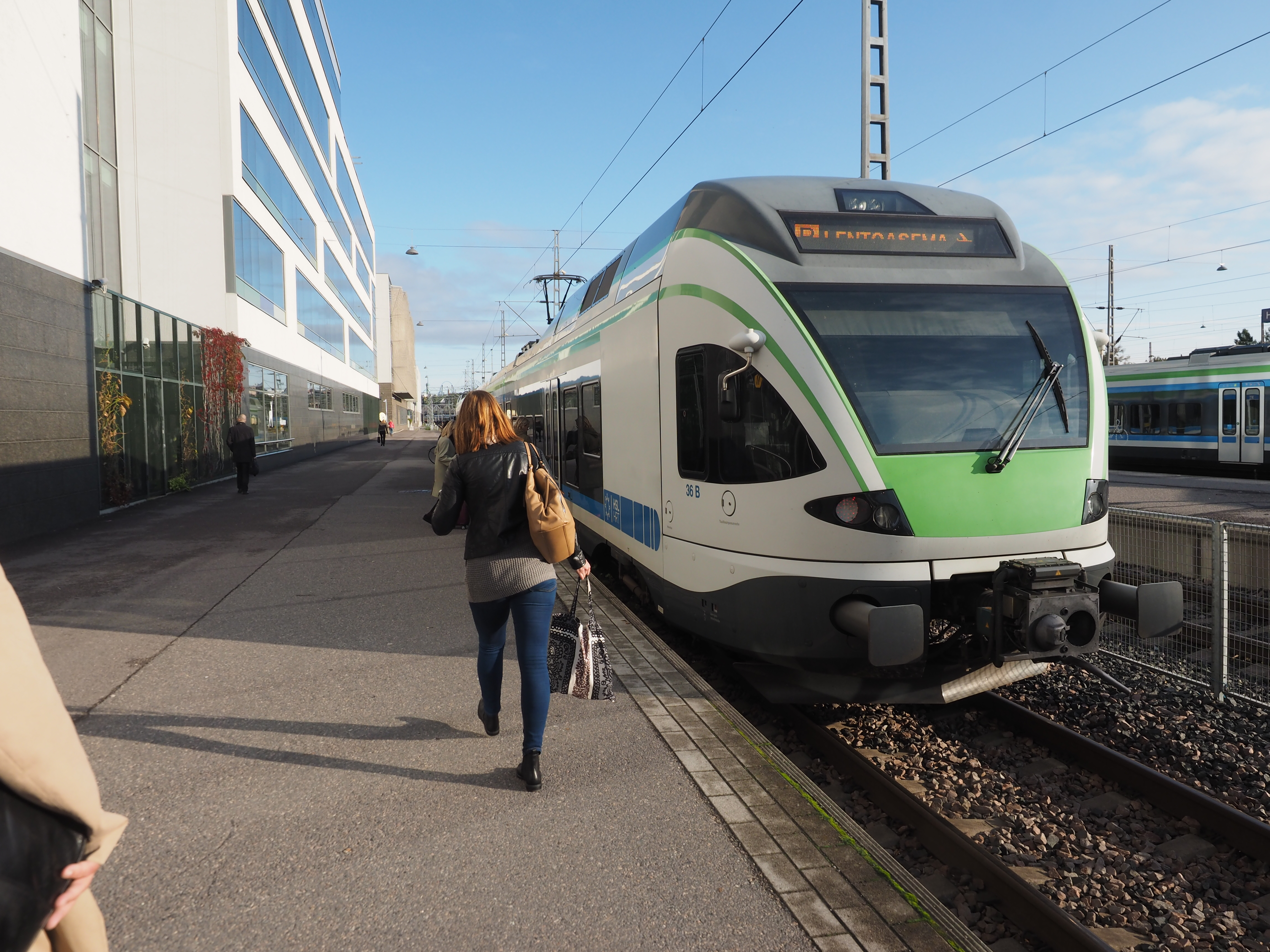
The P train (shown here) travels from central Helsinki to the airport via Myyrmäki and Martinlaakso in western Vantaa. The I train does the same via Tikkurila in eastern Vantaa.

The new line creates a connection from the airport to Helsinki Central railway station, as well as the suburban areas on the route. The new railway leaves the mainline going north from Helsinki after Tikkurila station in the east, travel via the airport and into Vantaankoski station to the west, joining the existing the branch line for western Vantaa which was previously served by the "M" train. Five new stations were built, with space reserved for three more in the future.

The line is served by the "P" and "I" trains which travel the ring clockwise and anticlockwise respectively. The journey time from the airport to Helsinki Central Railway Station is 27 minutes ("P" train) or 32 minutes ("I" train), whilst the time to Tikkurila, to connect with long-distance trains going north or east, is 8 minutes. Both trains operate every 10 minutes in the daytime.

== Stations ==
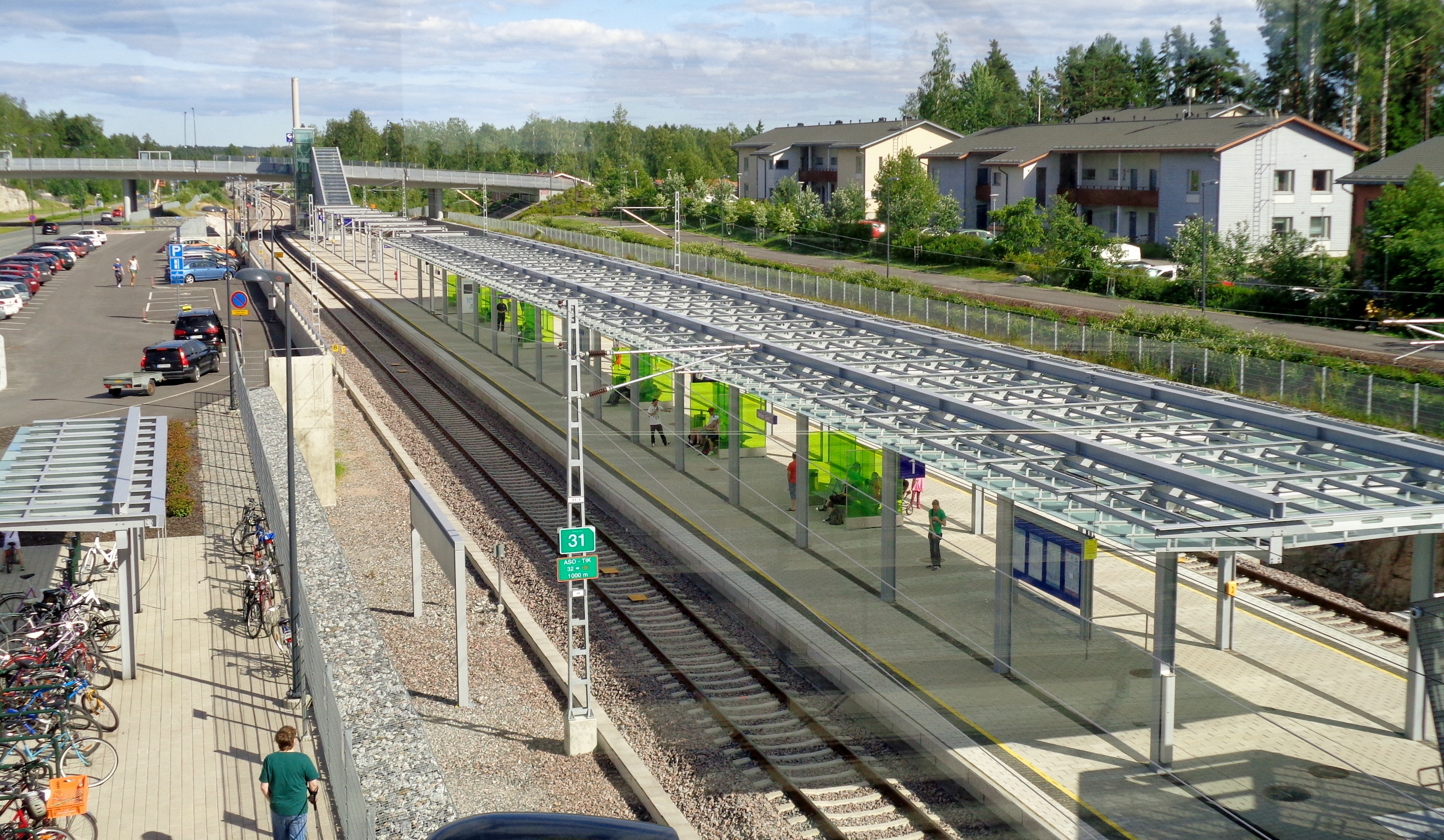
Leinelä, one of the new stations, in 2015.

In the first phase, five new stations were built at Vehkala, Kivistö, Aviapolis, Helsinki-Vantaa Airport and Leinelä. Out of these, the Aviapolis and Airport stations are located in a tunnel. Reservations have been made for three additional stations: Petas (surface), Viinikkala (tunnel) and Ruskeasanta (tunnel).

== Cost ==
The projected cost of the construction is €655 million as of September 2012, up from €605 million in March 2010. The estimated cost of the project in December 2014 was €738.5 million. The current estimated cost of the project is €773.8 million

== Future development ==
Separate proposals exist to extend the Helsinki Metro to the airport, and to move long-distance services from the current main North-South corridor to a new railway between Pasila and Kerava, passing through the airport. This new route, known as Lentorata, would travel in a long tunnel under the airport and allow direct access from long-distance trains, as well as free the rail capacity taken up by long-distance traffic in the current main corridor for the increasing local commuter traffic.

== See also ==
- Helsinki City Rail Loop
- Jokeri light rail
- Länsimetro
- Lentorata
