= Aviapolis railway station =

Railway station in Vantaa, Finland

Aviapolis
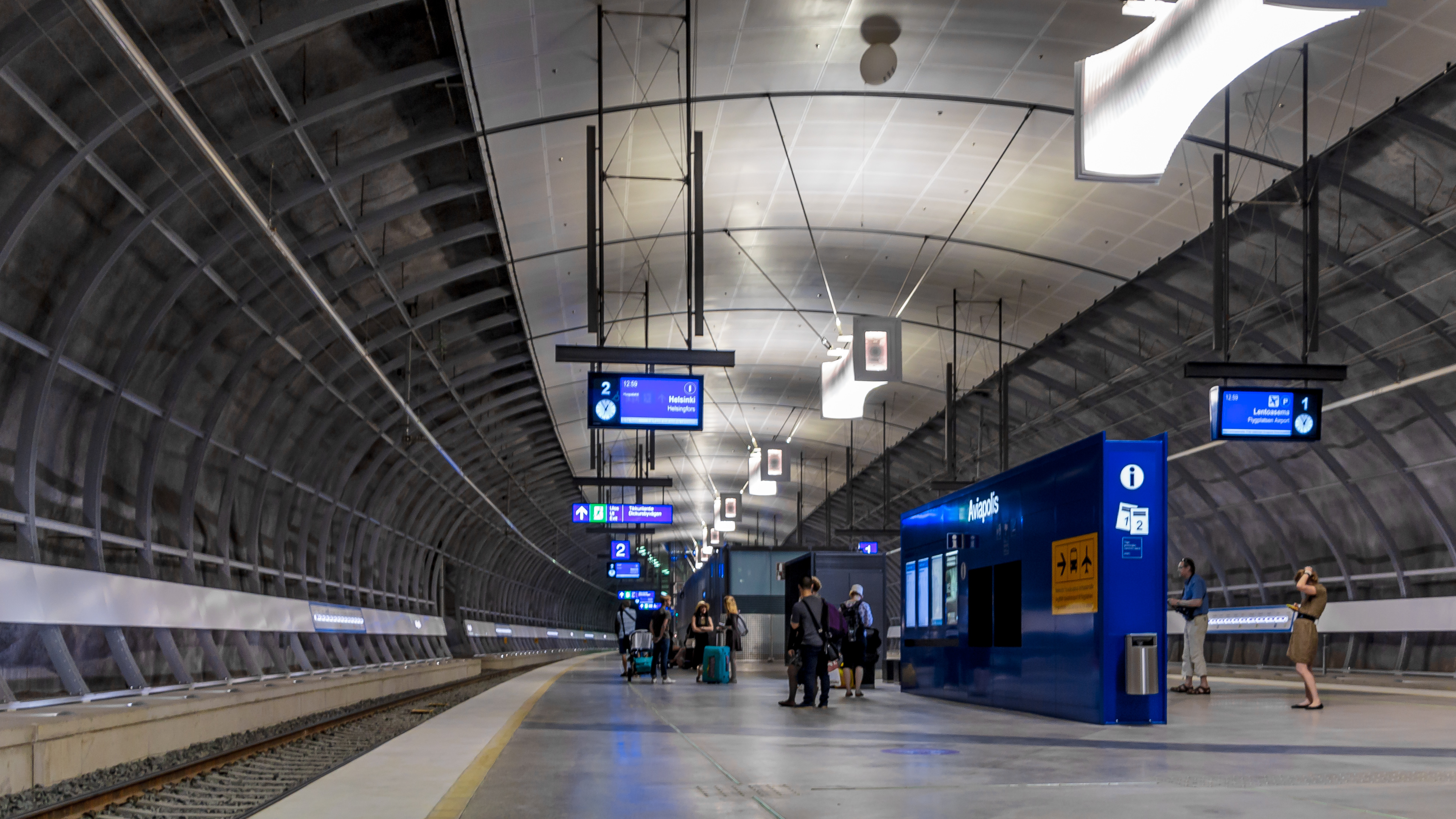

General information
- Location: Aviabulevardi 2, 01530; Aviapolis, Vantaa, Uusimaa; Finland
- Coordinates: 60.3041°N 24.9568°E
- System: Helsinki commuter rail station
- Owner: City of Vantaa
- Line: Ring Rail Line
- Platforms: 1 island platform
- Tracks: 2
- Train operators: VR on behalf of HSL
- Connections: 415N, 431N, 562, 570, 574, 576, 583/K, 584, 600, 617

Construction
- Structure type: tunnel station
- Depth: 40 m (130 ft)

Other information
- Station code: Avp
- Fare zone: C

History
- Opened: 1 July 2015

Passengers
- 2019: 1,075,075

Services
Preceding station	Helsinki commuter rail	Following station
Airport One-way operation	I counterclockwise via Tikkurila	Kivistö towards Helsinki
Kivistö One-way operation	P clockwise via Myyrmäki	Airport towards Helsinki via Airport
Location

Aviapolis railway station (Finnish: Aviapoliksen rautatieasema, Swedish: Aviapolis järnvägsstation) is a Helsinki commuter rail station located in the area of Aviapolis in Vantaa, Finland.

It is one of the new stations of the Ring Rail Line (Kehärata), which opened in July 2015. The station is located between the stations of Kivistö and Lentoasema (Helsinki Airport). The area around the station is planned to be turned into a neighbourhood with office buildings. A bus terminal has also been planned to be built next to the station.

The station is served by Helsinki Commuter Rail I- and P-line trains. Trains to Airport and Helsinki (via Tikkurila) depart from track 1 and trains towards Helsinki (via Huopalahti) depart from track 2.
