= Hiekkaharju railway station =

Railway station in Vantaa, Finland

Coordinates: 60°18′7″N 25°2′55″E

Hiekkaharju Sandkulla
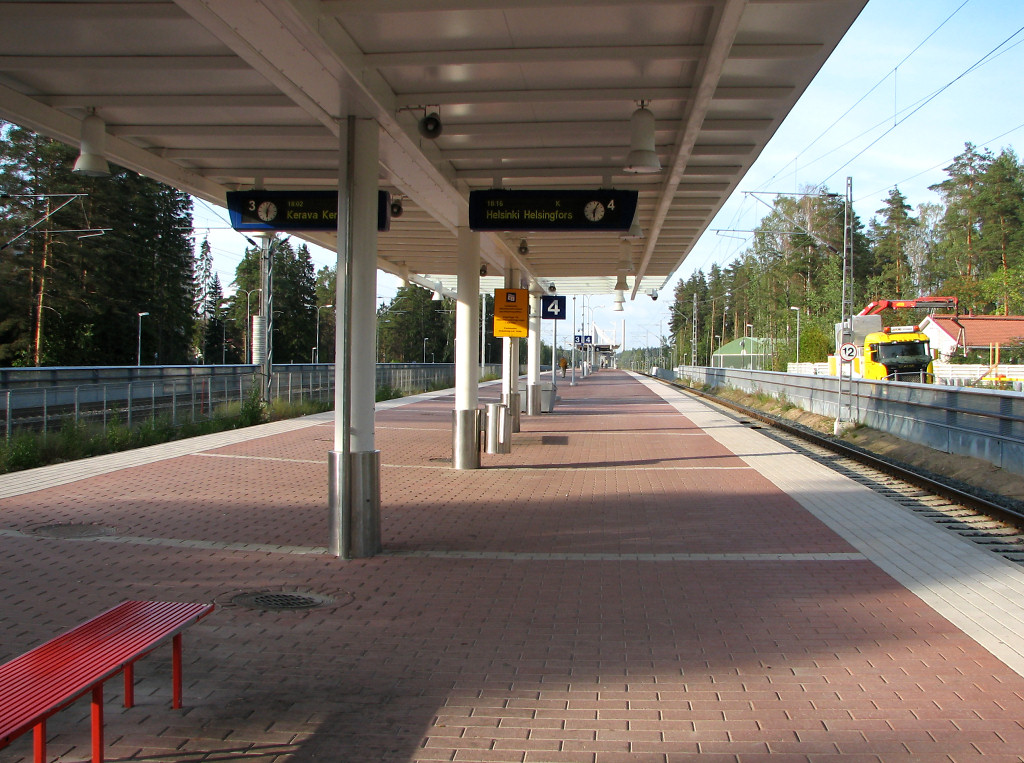

General information
- Location: Vantaa, Uusimaa; Finland
- System: Helsinki commuter rail station
- Owner: Finnish Transport Agency
- Lines: I, P, K, T
- Platforms: 1
- Connections: 625

Construction
- Structure type: ground station
- Accessible: 2

Other information
- Fare zone: C

Passengers
- 2019: 2,520,236

Services
| Preceding station | Helsinki commuter rail | Following station |
|---|---|---|
| Tikkurila One-way operation | I counterclockwise via Tikkurila | Leinelä towards Helsinki via Airport |
| Leinelä One-way operation | P clockwise via Myyrmäki | Tikkurila towards Helsinki |
| Tikkurila towards Helsinki | K | Koivukylä towards Kerava |
| Preceding station | VR commuter rail | Following station |
| Tikkurila towards Helsinki | T | Koivukylä towards Riihimäki |
Location

Hiekkaharju railway station (Finnish: Hiekkaharjun rautatieasema; Swedish: Sandkulla station) is a Helsinki commuter rail station located in the district of Hiekkaharju in the city of Vantaa, Finland. It is located approximately 17 kilometres (11 mi) from Helsinki Central railway station.

The Hiekkaharju station has acted as an in-between stop during the construction of the Kerava local railway track. The third track of the main railway was taken into use in 1972 between Helsinki and Hiekkaharju and was continued to Kerava in 1981. Likewise, the fourth track was completed in 1996 between Helsinki and Hiekkaharju and only continued to Kerava in 2004. When the local railway track was completed in 2004, the Hiekkaharju station was thoroughly renovated. Also the P train, running between Helsinki and Hiekkaharju, was discontinued and replaced with the I train, which only runs between Helsinki and Tikkurila.

== Connections ==
- I/P-line trains (Helsinki–Helsinki Airport–Helsinki)
- K-line trains (Helsinki–Kerava)
- T-line trains (Helsinki–Riihimäki), nighttime

== Departure tracks ==
There are four tracks at Hiekkaharju railway station, of which two (3, 4) have a platform for passenger trains.

- Track 3 is used by I trains to the Helsinki Airport as well as K and T trains towards Kerava.
- Track 4 is used by P, K and T trains to Helsinki.
