= Helsinki City Rail Loop =

Proposed railway line in Helsinki, Finland

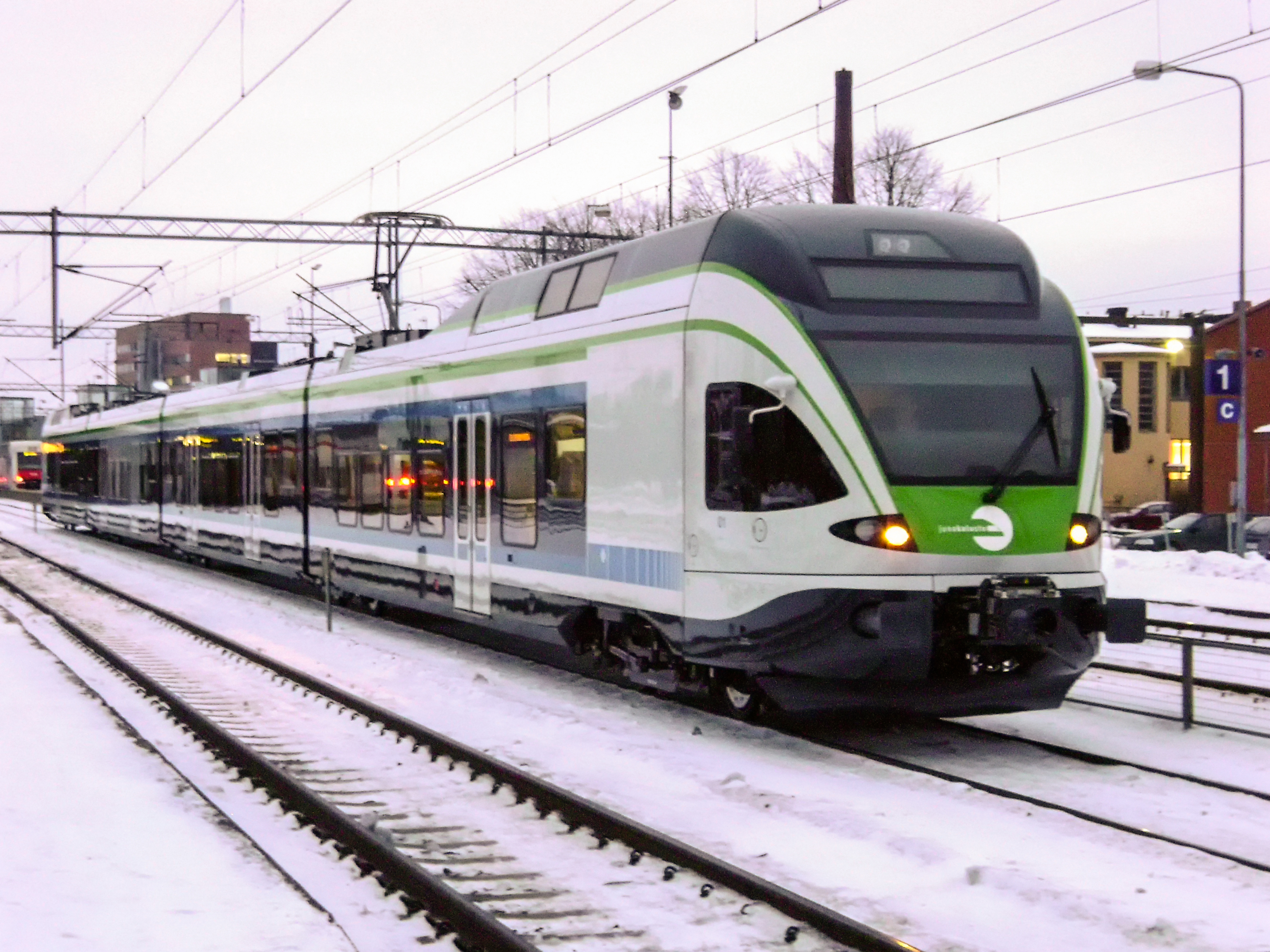
Helsinki commuter trains were to arrive under the city centre in tunnel, loop around, and return north again without terminating or reversing

The Helsinki City Rail Loop (Finnish: Pisararata literally translated: droplet railway, Swedish: Centrumslingan) was a planned new railway line in Helsinki, Southern Finland. It was to be a double track balloon loop in the shape of a tear drop. Helsinki commuter rail currently terminating at Helsinki Central railway station would have been diverted into tunnels under the city centre. New underground stations were to be created in Töölö (west), Helsinki city centre (south; likely directly under Forum shopping centre) and Hakaniemi metro station (east), with a possible fourth station at Alppila (north) depending on how the connection to the main line would have been made in relation to the existing northern Pasila railway station. The new tracks were to be 7 kilometres (4 mi) long. The plan was cancelled in 2025.

== Reasons for construction and cost estimate ==
The target is to free up capacity at Helsinki Central railway station to allow for expansion of long-distance trains; the existing capacity between Pasila and Helsinki has been all used up with the opening of the Ring Rail Line in 2014. Detailed planning took place during 2012–2015, resulting in the project being shelved in February 2015. The project was initially expected to cost €956 million if completed by the 2020s. For the planning stages, €40 million was allocated. By 2019 the expected cost of the original plan had risen to €1.5 billion.

== Planning status ==
In June 2022, the Finnish Transport Infrastructure Agency (FTIA) published a report stating that the City Rail Loop is not necessary, and suggested alternatives such as renewal of commuter train fleets and improved railway signalling. Individual changes in gear and geometry are also needed in the railway area of the Central railway station and Pasila. However, the study has looked at a situation in which the City Rail Loop, Lentorata, the new direct line between Riihimäki and Tampere and the Helsinki–Turku high-speed railway would have been implemented.

== Alignment and stations ==
The double-track rail connection running beneath Helsinki's inner city would be 8 kilometres long, of which about 6 kilometres would be in tunnel. The loop would link the lines towards Espoo and Vantaankoski with the lines towards Kerava. The Rail Loop would bring passengers all the way into the city centre, and the number of transfers would decrease as trains would also stop at Hakaniemi and Töölö. Although the route is slightly longer than the current direct route, travel time to the core city centre would remain roughly the same, since train speeds in the tunnel would be higher than in the current rail yard.

Hakaniemi railway station would be integrated with the metro station. The City Centre station would be located by the corner of the Forum shopping centre, and the Töölö railway station is planned near Töölöntori. In the city centre, and especially at Hakaniemi, there would be the option to transfer to the metro line. In Töölö there could also potentially be an interchange with the proposed Töölö metro line.

=== Alternatives considered ===
In the general planning and environmental impact assessment (EIA), three project alternatives were studied. In Alternative 1, the tunnel portals are at the Eläintarha sports field and by Linnanmäki, and the new underground stations are at Töölö, the City Centre and Hakaniemi. In Alternatives 2 and 3, the tunnel portals are at Eläintarha and north of Hakamäentie. In Alternative 2, the new underground stations would be at Töölö, the City Centre, Hakaniemi and Pasila. Alternative 3 also includes a station at Alppila.

In the general planning phase, the functional solutions for the alternatives, such as the locations of stations and rail tunnels as well as access connections, were designed, and construction costs were estimated. FTIA approved the general plan for the Pisara railway in 2012. For further planning, Alignment Alternative 1 was chosen, in which the tunnel section begins south of Pasila station at the level of Eläintarha and Alppipuisto. The selected alignment was deemed the best option economically and technically.

=== Vauhtitie Bridge ===
The Rail Loop would run almost entirely underground, so changes to the cityscape would be very local. The most visible parts would be in Pasila before the line dives into the tunnel at the western edge of Alppipuisto and at Eläintarha. If the Pisara is implemented, a rail bridge will be built over Vauhtitie.

As part of the Pisara's design, a design competition was held from 19 November 2012 to 8 March 2013 concerning the bridge to be built over Vauhtitie and its surrounding area. Particular weight in the competition was given to integrating the rail bridge and the changes it causes into the environment. Four different design teams were invited to participate. The jury unanimously chose as the winner Pöyry Finland Oy’s team with the proposal “Chicaner”.

== Criticism ==
The Rail Loop has been considered an unnecessary project, and it has been claimed that a viable project should have a benefit.cost ratio of 1.5-1.7, whereas for the Rail Loop it would be only 0.5. The low benefit-cost ratio in the calculation commissioned by the FTIA caused confusion, and its accuracy has been publicly questioned. According to a study commissioned by Helsinki Regional Transport Authority, construction of the Rail Loop would generate about 10,000 person‑years of employment and produce €1.5 billion in output from the investment. In addition, even greater benefits would be realised after the line enters service, for example through increased housing production.

The media has speculated that the City of Helsinki prefers the Rail Loop over a metro line because it would be cheaper for the city. The city would have to pay 70 percent of a metro project, with the state covering 30 percent, whereas for the Rail Loop the city would pay 30 percent and the state 70 percent. The state would pay more for the Rail Loop because it is considered to benefit the entire country. The background is that problems caused by congestion in Helsinki's rail yard also affect long-distance rail services.

== See also ==
- Ring Rail Line
- Helsinki to Tallinn Tunnel
