= Hiekkaharju =

Hiekkaharju Sandkulla
- City District
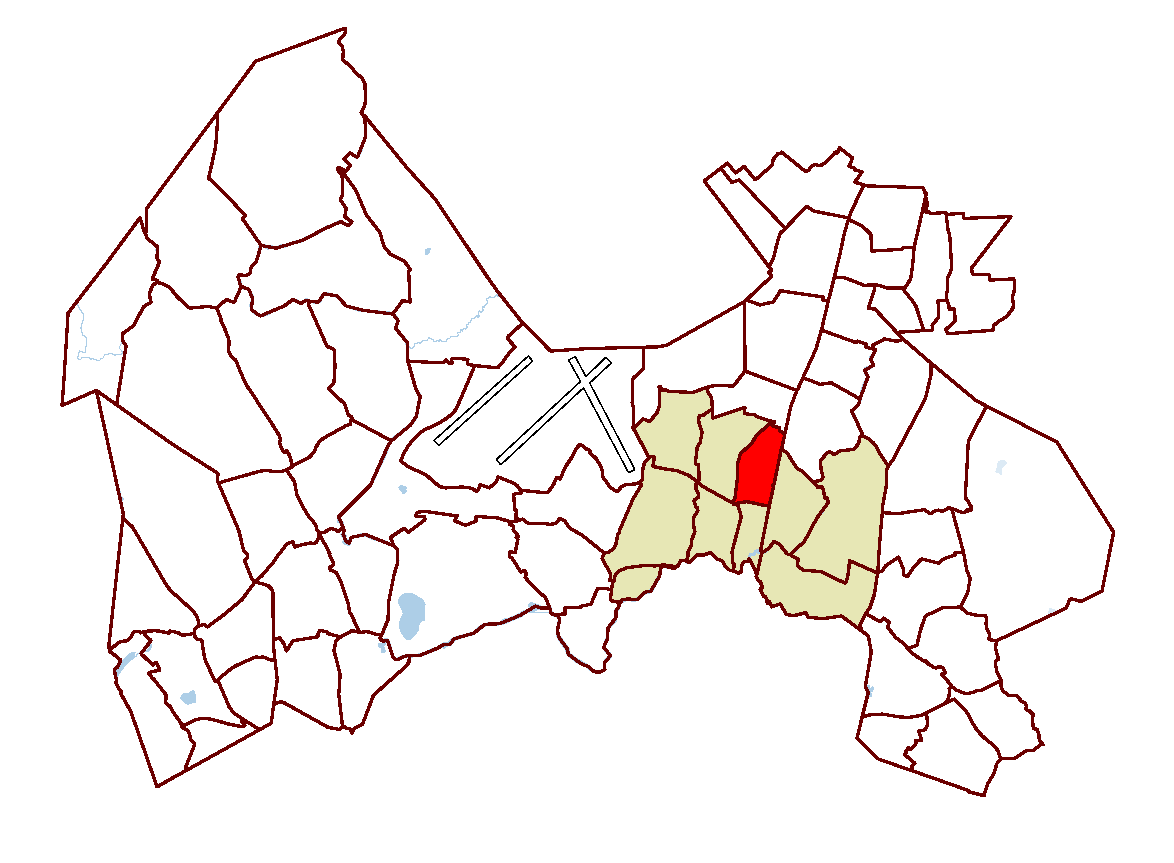
- Location on the map of Vantaa
- Coordinates: 60°18′12″N 25°02′56″E

Population (1.1.2014)
  - Total: 4,930
- Time zone: GMT +2
- Postal Code(s): 01350
- Website: www.vantaa.fi/frontpage/

Hiekkaharju (Swedish: Sandkulla, English meaning: "sand esker") is a district in Vantaa, Finland, located north of the Tikkurila district. It has its own railway station, the Hiekkaharju railway station, which serves commuter trains around Greater Helsinki. The district has a population of about 4,930 (in 2014). Hiekkaharju primarily accommodates housing, as shops and services are concentrated in the nearby commercial hub of Tikkurila. The first housing in the district was built in the 1920s, and the 1950s saw the rise of denser settlement, with the construction of many apartment buildings.

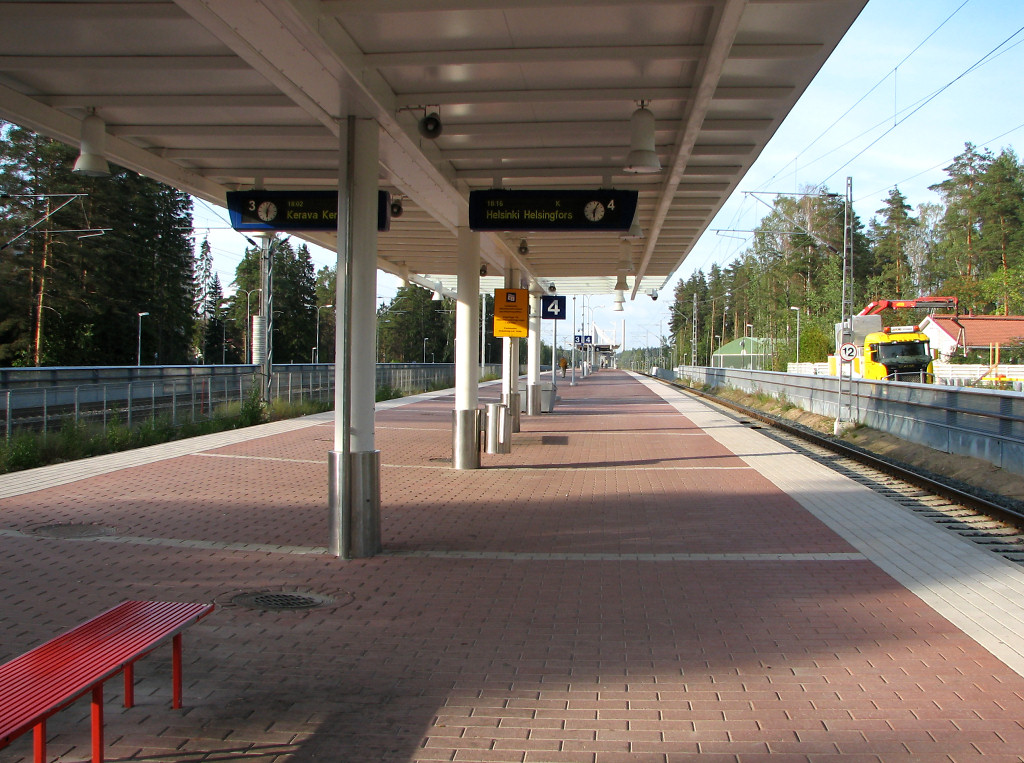
The Hiekkaharju railway station in 2006

== See also ==
- Simonkylä
