= Leinelä railway station =

Helsinki commuter rail station

Leinelä Lejle
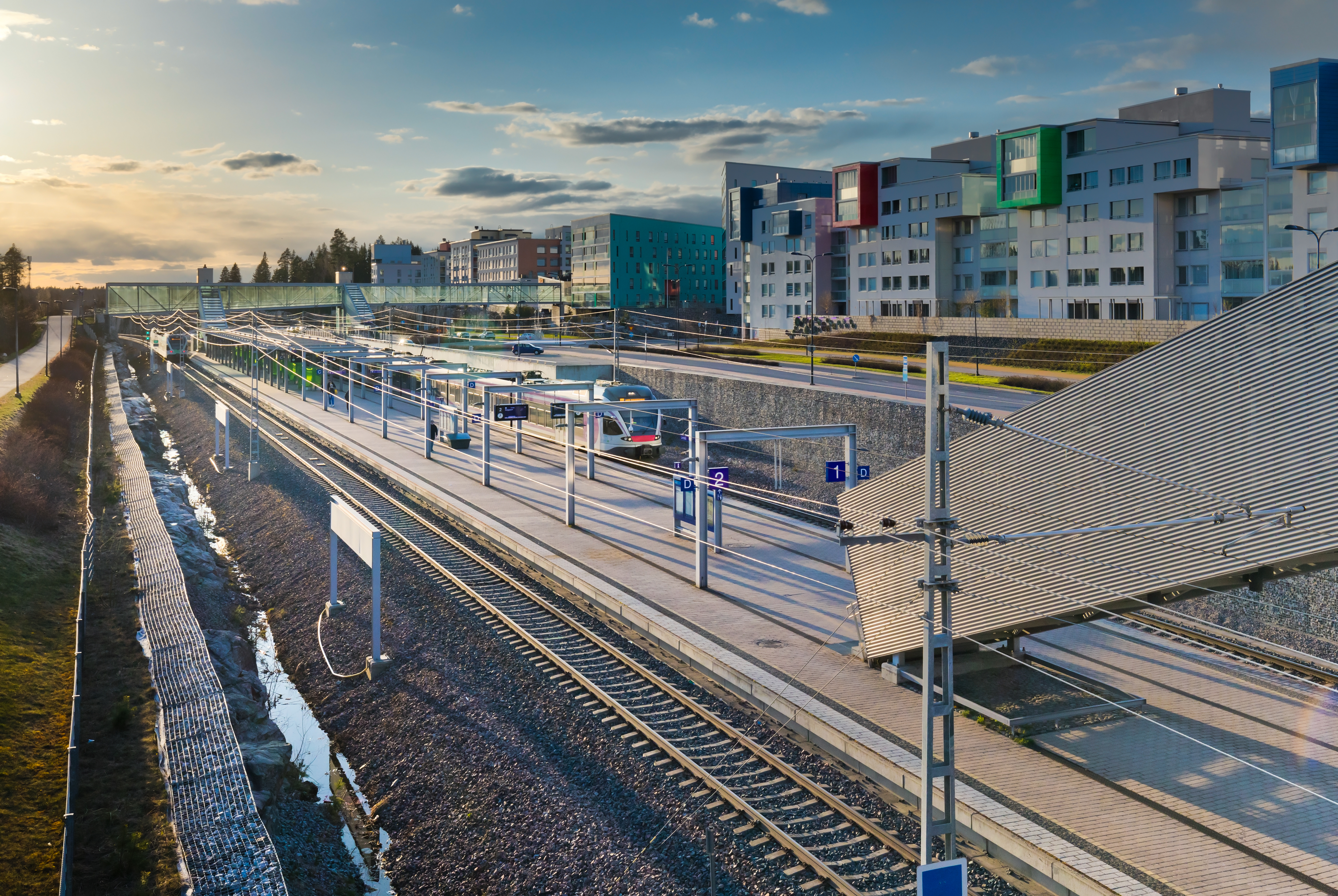

General information
- Location: Koivukylänväylä 54, 01360; Koivukylä, Vantaa, Uusimaa; Finland
- Coordinates: 60.3226°N 25.0395°E
- System: Helsinki commuter rail station
- Owner: City of Vantaa
- Line: Ring Rail Line
- Platforms: 1 island platform
- Tracks: 2
- Train operators: VR on behalf of HSL
- Connections: bus lines 574, 623, 623B, 624, 624N, 631, 633N, 635, 635B, 641, 642, 642K, 736

Construction
- Structure type: ground station
- Accessible: 1

Other information
- Station code: Lnä
- Fare zone: C

History
- Opened: 1 July 2015

Passengers
- 2019: 1,397,991

Services
Preceding station	Helsinki commuter rail	Following station
Hiekkaharju One-way operation	I counterclockwise via Tikkurila	Airport towards Helsinki via Airport
Airport One-way operation	P clockwise via Myyrmäki	Hiekkaharju towards Helsinki
Location

Leinelä railway station (Finnish: Leinelän rautatieasema, Swedish: Lejle järnvägsstation) is a Helsinki commuter rail station located in Leinelä, one of the newest neighbourhoods in the city of Vantaa, Finland.

It is one of the new stations of the Ring Rail Line (Kehärata), which opened in July 2015. The station is located between the stations of Hiekkaharju and Lentoasema (Helsinki Airport).
