= Rekola railway station =

Railway station in Vantaa, Finland

Rekola Räckhals
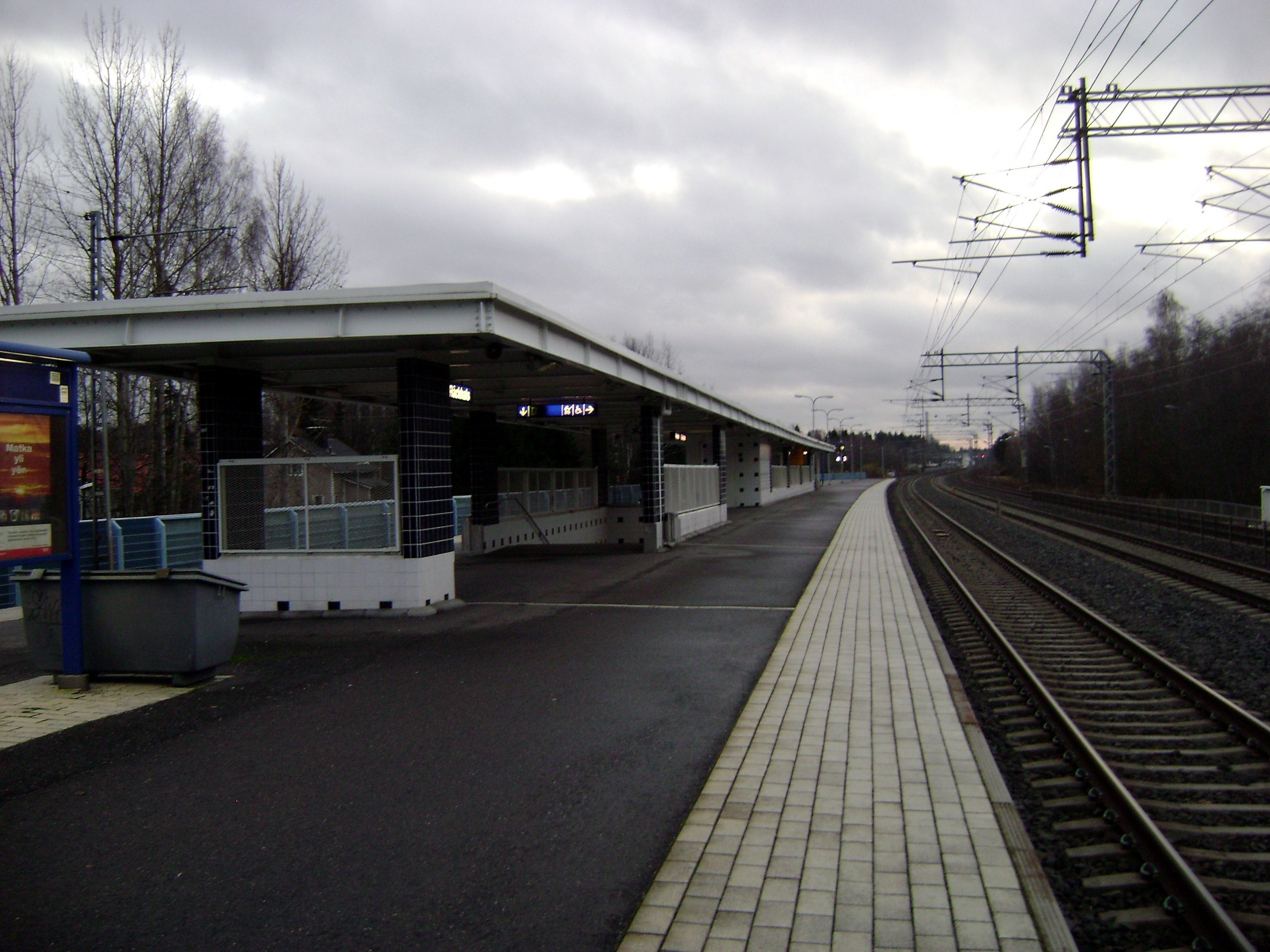

General information
- Location: Rekola district Vantaa, Uusimaa; Finland
- Coordinates: 60°19′58″N 25°4′6″E
- System: Helsinki commuter rail station
- Owner: Finnish Transport Infrastructure Agency
- Line: Helsinki–Riihimäki railway
- Platforms: Island platform
- Tracks: 2 (with platform); 4 (total)
- Connections: bus lines 54, 67, 67A, 70, 700N, 730, 730A, 730P

Construction
- Accessible: 1

Other information
- Station code: Rkl
- Fare zone: C

History
- Opened: 1889
- Rebuilt: 1980

Passengers
- 2019: 799,642

Services
Preceding station	Helsinki commuter rail	Following station
Koivukylä towards Helsinki	K	Korso towards Kerava
Preceding station	VR commuter rail	Following station
Koivukylä towards Helsinki	T	Korso towards Riihimäki
Location

Rekola railway station (Finnish: Rekolan rautatieasema; Swedish: Räckhals station) is a Helsinki commuter rail station located in the district of Rekola in the city of Vantaa, Finland. It is located approximately 20 kilometres (12 mi) from Helsinki Central railway station.

The Rekola station was moved to its current location in 1980, coinciding with the replacement of the Hanala station by the contemporary Koivukylä stop.

== Connections ==
- K-line trains (Helsinki–Kerava)
- T-line trains (Helsinki–Riihimäki), nighttime

== Departure tracks ==
There are four tracks at Rekola railway station, of which two (3, 4) have a platform for passenger trains.

- Track 3 is used by K trains to Kerava and T trains to Riihimäki.
- Track 4 is used by K and T trains to Helsinki.
