= Simonkylä =

Simonkylä Simonsböle
- City District
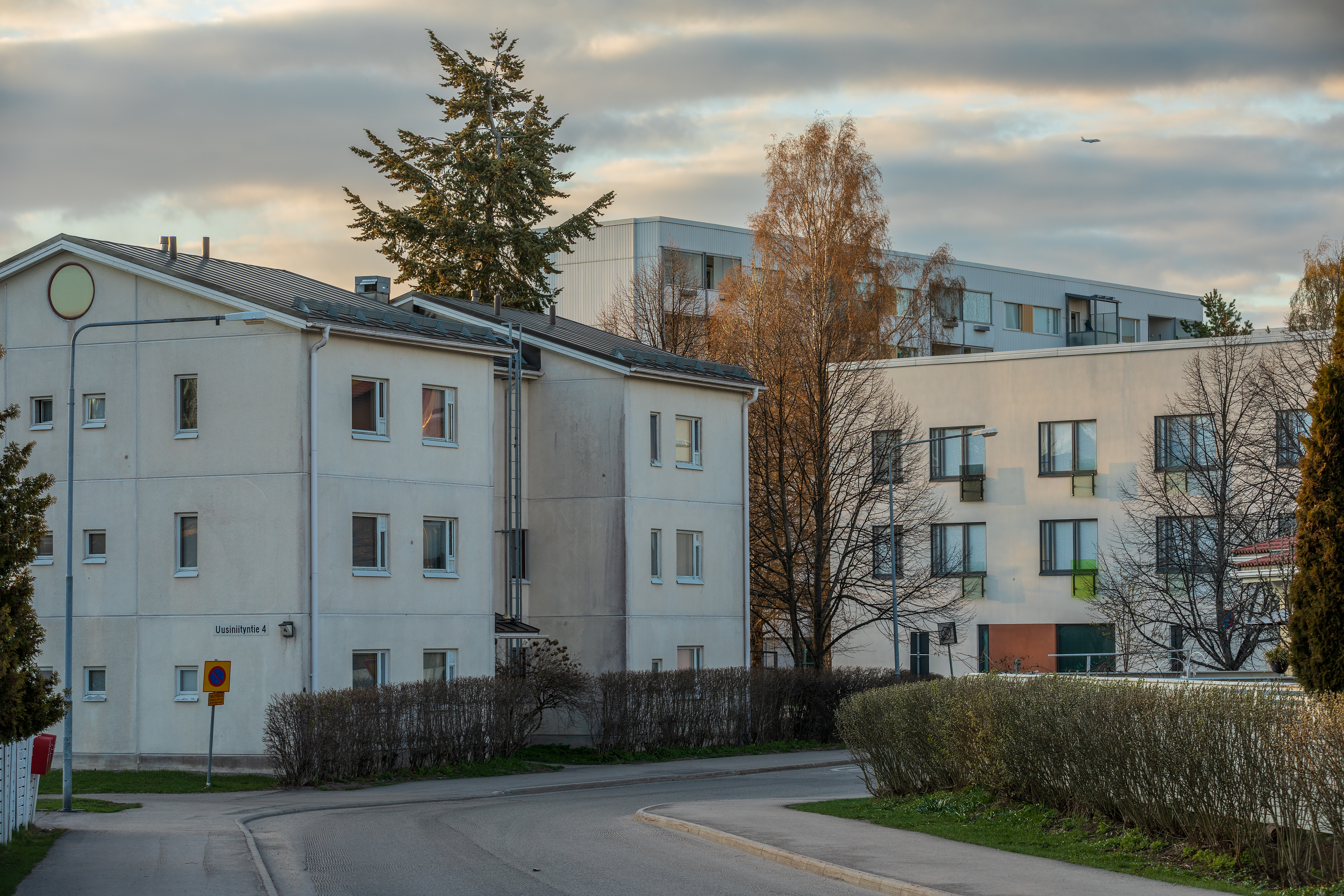
- Apartment buildings in Simonkylä.

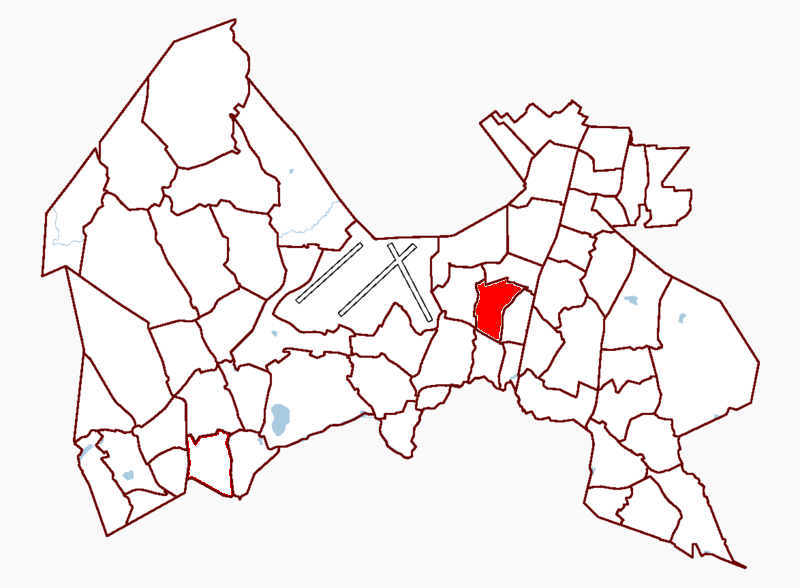
- Location on the map of Vantaa
- Coordinates: 60°18′35.280″N 25°01′52.680″E
- Country: Finland
- City: Vantaa
- Major region: Tikkurila

Population (1.1.2020)
  - Total: 8,123
- Time zone: GMT +2
- Postal Code(s): 01350
- Website: www.vantaa.fi/frontpage/

Simonkylä (Swedish: Simonsböle) is a district in Vantaa, Finland, located west of the Tikkurila district. The district has a population of about 8,000 (in 2020). It has the largest population of all the neighborhoods that are part of Tikkurila's major region, but it has very few jobs, which makes it primarily a residential area.

The most prominent services in the area are Simonkallio elementary school and Simonkylä secondary school, several kindergartens, a youth center and Simonkoti nursing home. Hiekkaharju's own school operates near the district.
