= Koivukylä railway station =

Railway station in Vantaa, Finland

Koivukylä Björkby
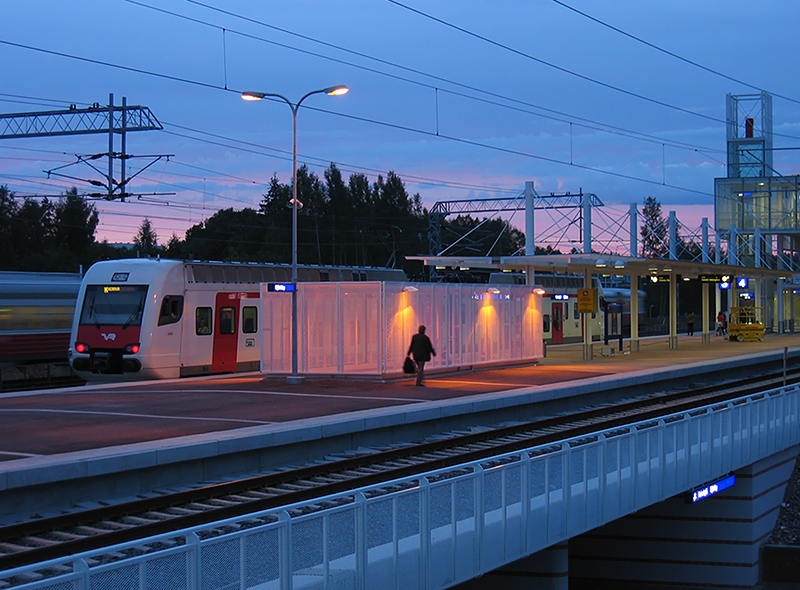

General information
- Location: Vantaa, Uusimaa; Finland
- Coordinates: 60°19′24″N 25°3′36″E
- System: Helsinki commuter rail station
- Owner: Finnish Transport Agency
- Platforms: Island platform
- Connections: bus lines 52, 53, 67, 67A, 71, 71A, 71K, 87, 87K, 611N, 623, 623V, 623Z, 732, 873, 873B, 873K

Construction
- Structure type: ground station
- Parking: Yes
- Cycle facilities: Yes
- Accessible: 1

Other information
- Fare zone: C

History
- Opened: 1980

Passengers
- 2019: 2,155,707

Services
Preceding station	Helsinki commuter rail	Following station
Hiekkaharju towards Helsinki	K	Rekola towards Kerava
Preceding station	VR commuter rail	Following station
Hiekkaharju towards Helsinki	T	Rekola towards Riihimäki
Location

Koivukylä railway station (Finnish: Koivukylän rautatieasema; Swedish: Björkby station) is a Helsinki commuter rail station located in the district of Koivukylä in the city of Vantaa, Finland. It is located approximately 19 kilometres (12 mi) from Helsinki Central railway station.

== Connections ==
- K-line trains (Helsinki–Kerava)
- T-line trains (Helsinki–Riihimäki), nighttime

== Departure tracks ==
There are four tracks at Koivukylä railway station, of which two (3, 4) have a platform for passenger trains.

- Track 3 is used by K trains to Kerava and T trains to Riihimäki.
- Track 4 is used by K and T trains to Helsinki.
