= Seutula =

Seutula Sjöskog
- City District
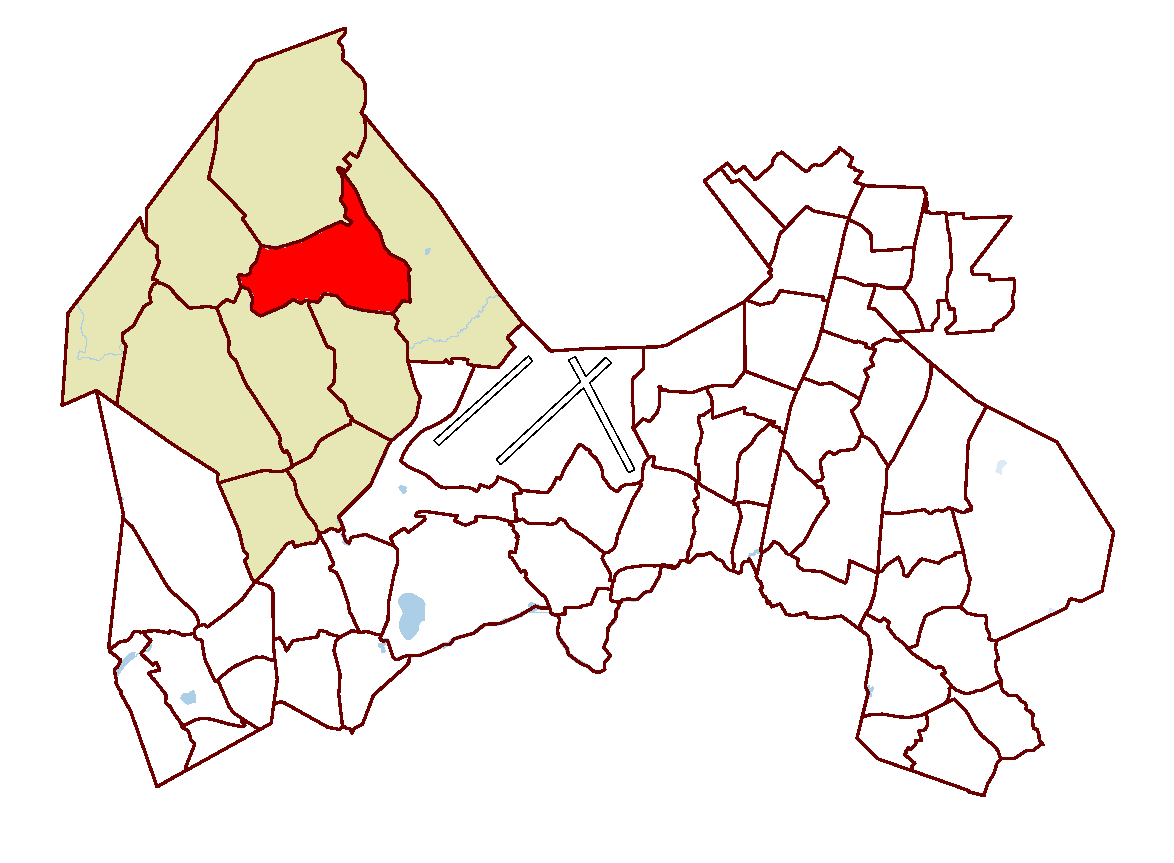
- Location on the map of Vantaa
- Coordinates: 60°20′52″N 24°51′56″E

Population (1.1.2014)
  - Total: 872
- Time zone: GMT +2
- Postal Code(s): 01760
- Website: www.vantaa.fi/frontpage/

Seutula (Swedish: Sjöskog) is a district in Vantaa, Finland, located inside the curve of the River Vantaa.

Seutula is also a village in the medieval town of Helsinki, stretching to Rajakoski in the north, Lavanko in the east covering the whole district of Kiila, and including Sotilaskorpi in the south. On the other hand, the western part of the river's curve, including the Königstedt Manor, belongs to the village of Riipilä.

Seutula is often considered a region stretching even outside the official district, and it has an active local community. In terms of government, Seutula, Riipilä, and Kiila belong to the Kivistö major district.

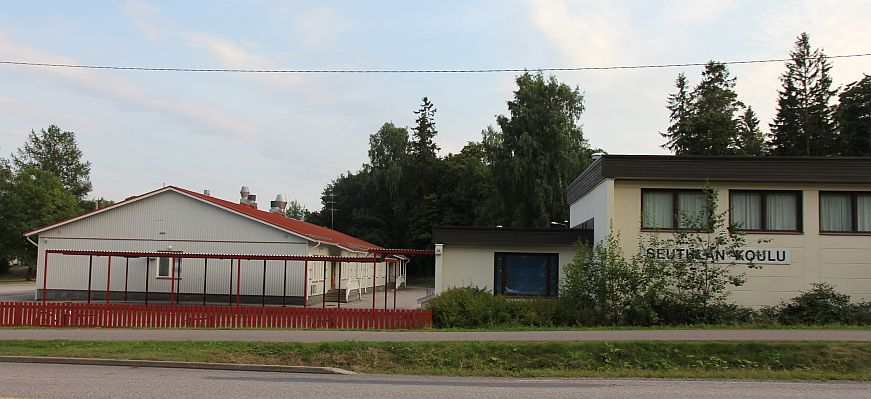
The Seutula school.

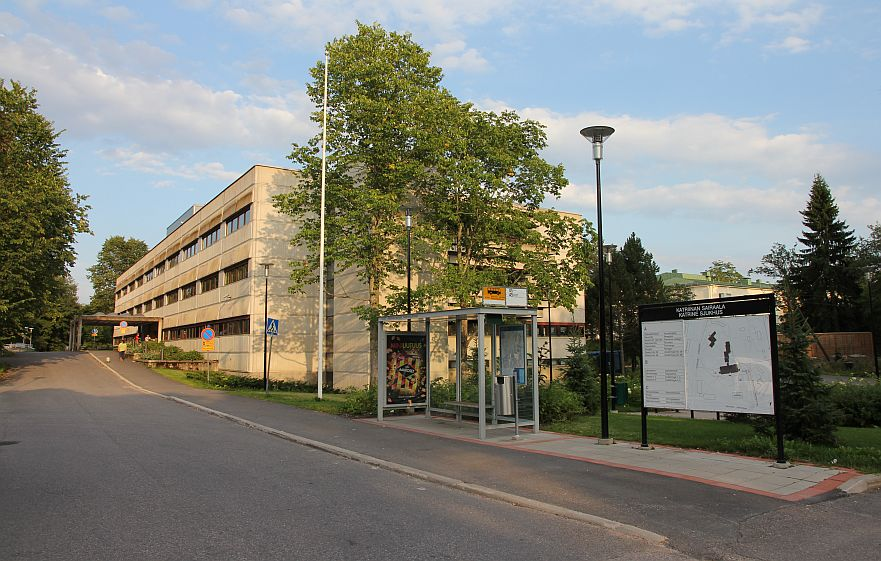
The Katriina Hospital in Seutula.

In the early 1950s, a new airfield for Helsinki was built along the Seutulantie road, stretching from Tuusulantie in Ruskeasanta to Seutula. This airfield was opened in 1952, and became the Helsinki Airport in 1977. Already during its construction, the airfield was commonly called the Seutula airfield, because Tuusulantie had a sign pointing to Seutula. In reality, the airfield was built about 8 kilometres southeast from Seutula, in the northern parts of Veromiehenkylä and Kirkonkylä. Nowadays, Lentokenttä (Finnish for "airfield") is its own district in Vantaa.

The name Seutula is often connected to prisons, although there never has been a prison in Seutula. The reason for the connection is that the airfield was mainly built using prisoner labour. Some of the prisoners used to build the airfield were public figures of the 1960s, convicted of driving under influence, bringing the activity to light. An open prison was located in Seutula until 2009. This prison was originally called a labour colony, and one of its inmates in the 1960s was Irwin Goodman, who had made records about the subject called Terveisiä Seutulasta ("greetings from Seutula") and Autolla Kanarian saarille ("to the Canary Islands by car"), with lyrics by Vexi Salmi.
