= Tikkurila =

Tikkurila Dickursby
- City district
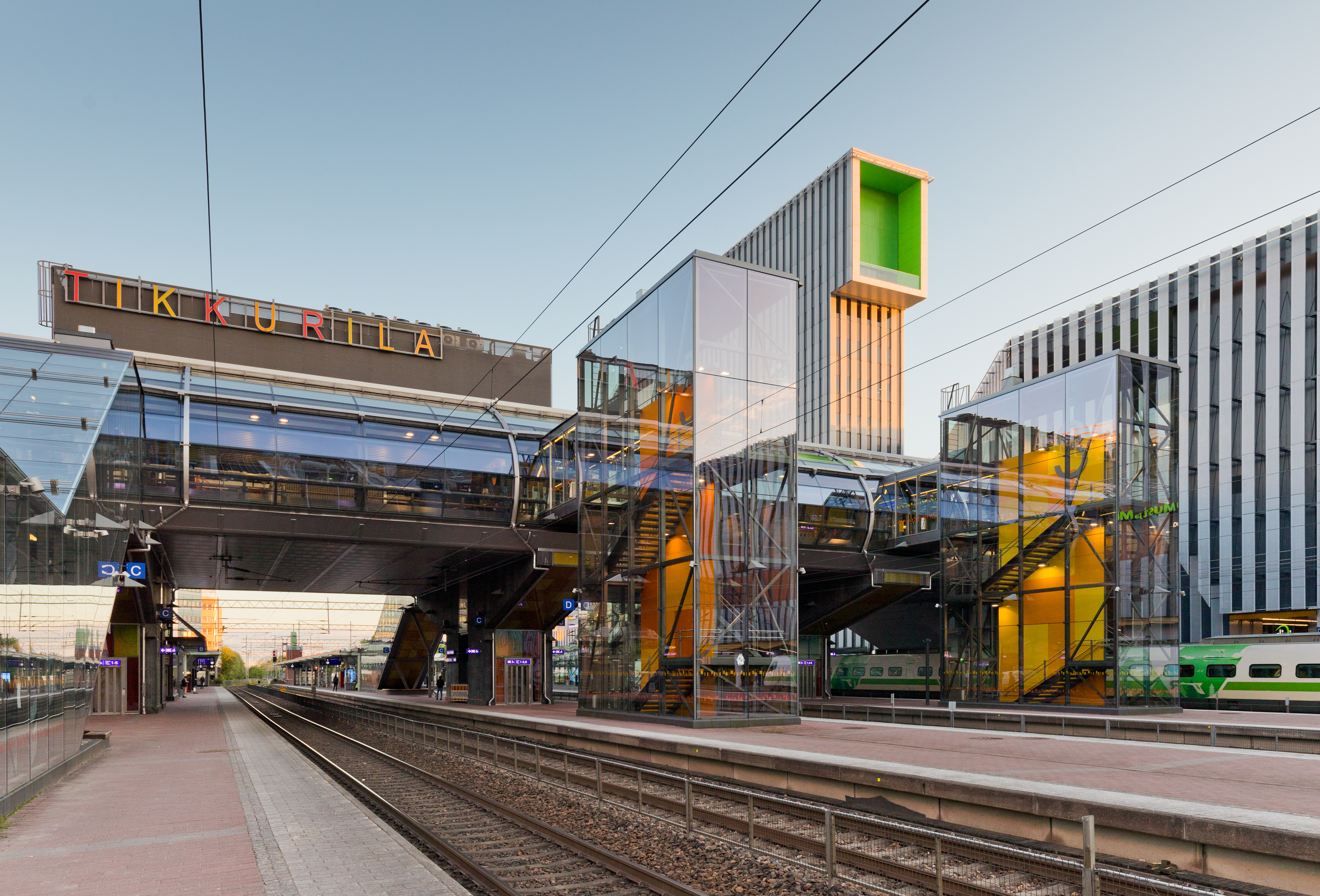
- Tikkurila railway station
- Etymology: Finnish: tikkuri ("an amount of 10")
- Nickname: Tiksi
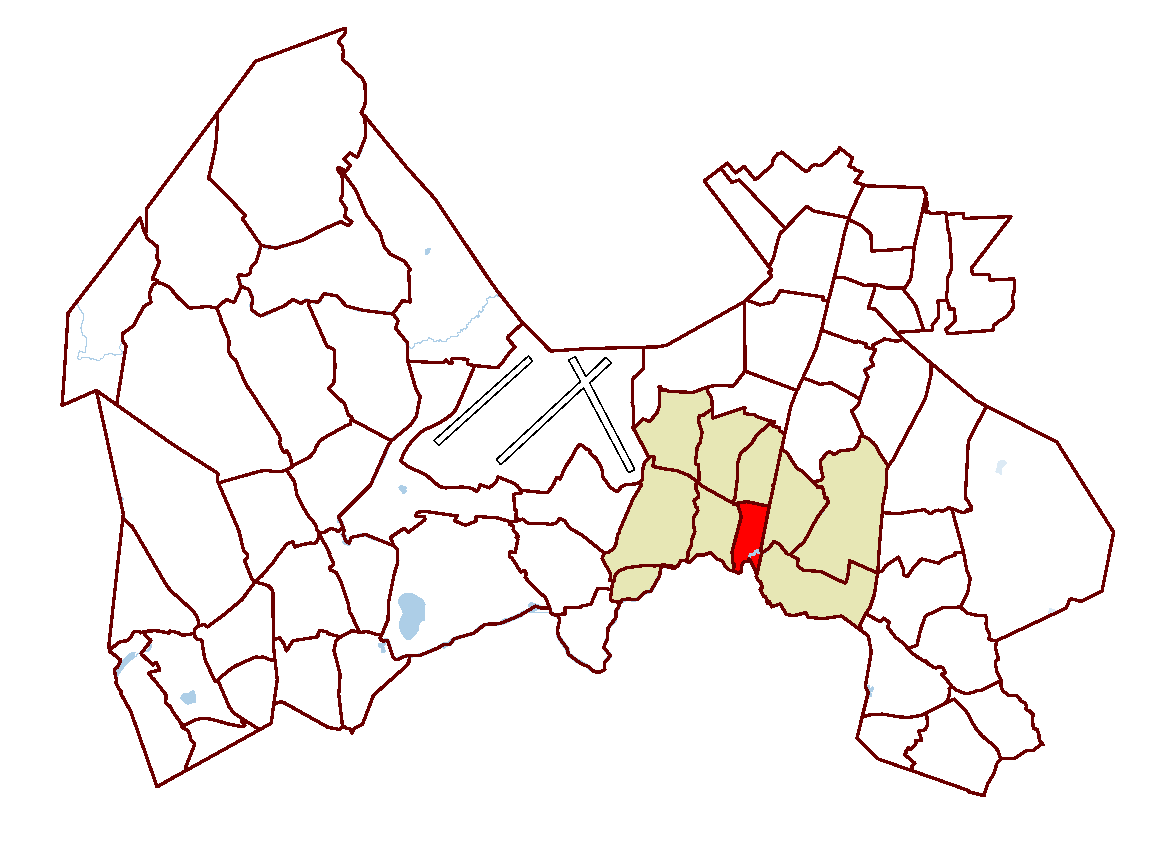
- Location on the map of Vantaa, with the district in red and the major region in light brown
- Coordinates: 60°17′35″N 25°02′38″E
- Country: Finland
- City: Vantaa
- Major region: Tikkurila

Area
  - Total: 1.0 km^{2} (0.39 sq mi)
  - Major region: 23.1 km^{2} (8.9 sq mi)

Population (31.12.2023)
  - Total: 8,815
  - Density: 8,800/km^{2} (23,000/sq mi)
  - Major region: 49,750
  - Major region density: 2,150/km^{2} (5,580/sq mi)
- Time zone: GMT +2
- Postal Code(s): 01300, 01301
- Website: www.vantaa.fi/frontpage

Tikkurila (Finnish: [ˈtikːurilɑ]; Swedish: Dickursby) is a district and major region of the municipality of Vantaa, Finland. Located in the eastern half of the Helsinki conurbation, some 16 kilometres (10 mi) north of the capital's downtown district, it is the administrative and commercial hub of Vantaa, although Myyrmäki is a rival commercial hub within the municipality.

Tikkurila's most popular attraction is the science center Heureka. Tikkurila railway station is the busiest in Vantaa and third-busiest in Finland. As the nearest mainline station to Helsinki Airport (located 6 km or 3 1/2 mi from Tikkurila), it is served by all the high-speed Pendolino trains on the Helsinki to Tampere and Lahti routes as well as other long-distance services.

Some of the other communities surrounding Tikkurila are Jokiniemi, Simonkylä, Ruskeasanta, Hiekkaharju, and Puistola in the Helsinki municipality.

== History ==
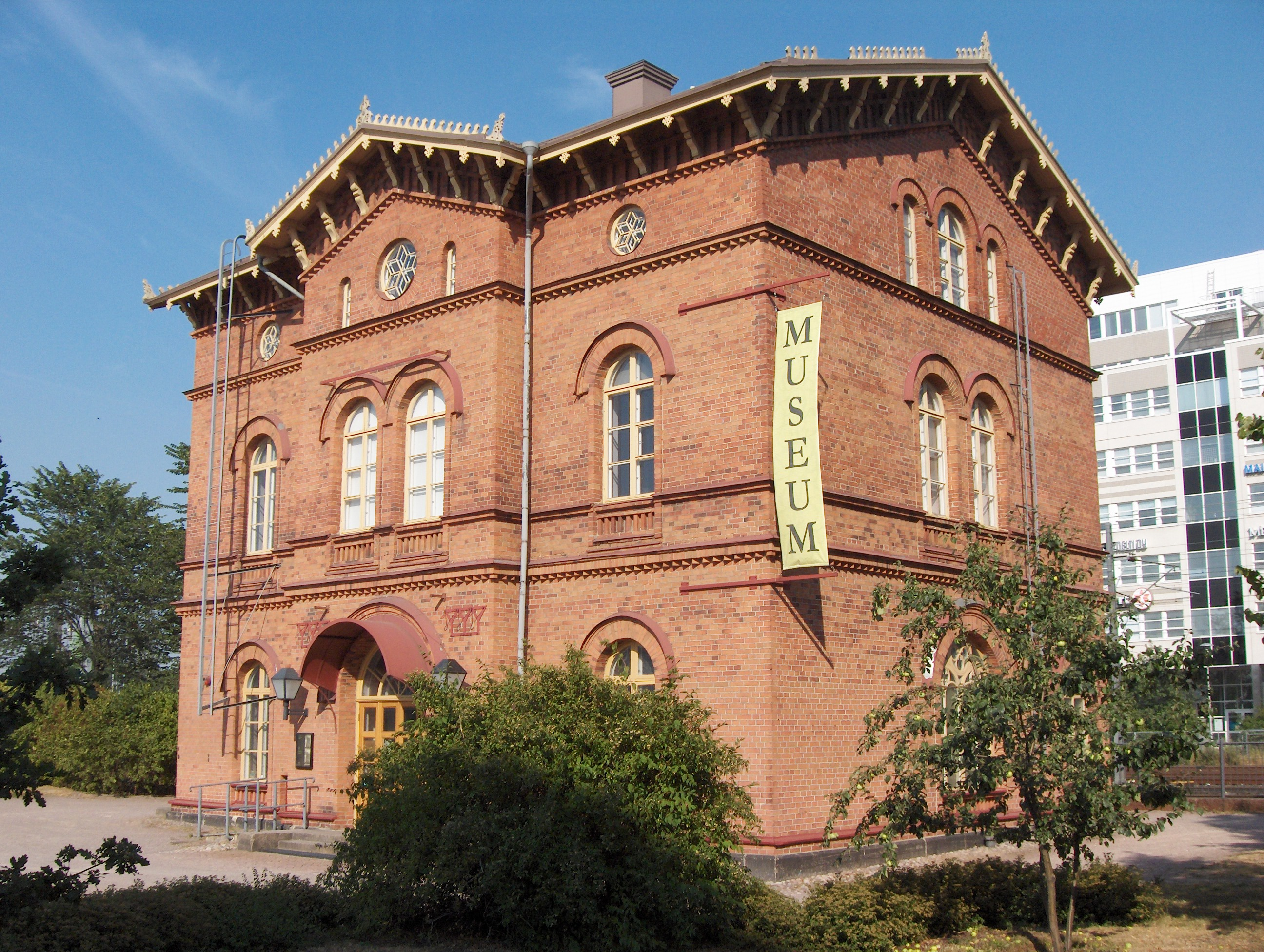
The old railway station of Tikkurila, now a museum

Tikkurila has been a marketplace since the 16th century, from which it has also received its name. Tikkuri is an old Finnish term referring to an amount of ten, used in fur trading at the time. The road between Turku and Vyborg, King's Road, ran through the area, though the area remained a sparsely populated piece of the Helsinki Parish until the late 1800s.

In 1862, the railway between Helsinki and Hämeenlinna was constructed, and one of its seven stations was built in Tikkurila, on its intersection with King's Road. The Swedish architect Carl Albert Edelfelt designed a Renaissance Revival styled station building, which (as of the 1970s) has since been adapted into the Vantaa City Museum. The railway brought industry into the area, including an expeller pressing plant, which currently operates in the area as the paint manufacturer Tikkurila Oyj. The railway also induced population growth.

In 1946, Tikkurila became the administrative hub of Vantaa (then known as Helsingin maalaiskunta, English: Rural municipality of Helsinki), after Malmi was transferred to Helsinki. Post-war population growth led to Tikkurila becoming the most populated area in Vantaa, though the Myyrmäki district and major region have both since become more populated than the Tikkurila equivalents. In 1960, a neofuturistic swimming hall was completed in Tikkurila.

== Culture ==
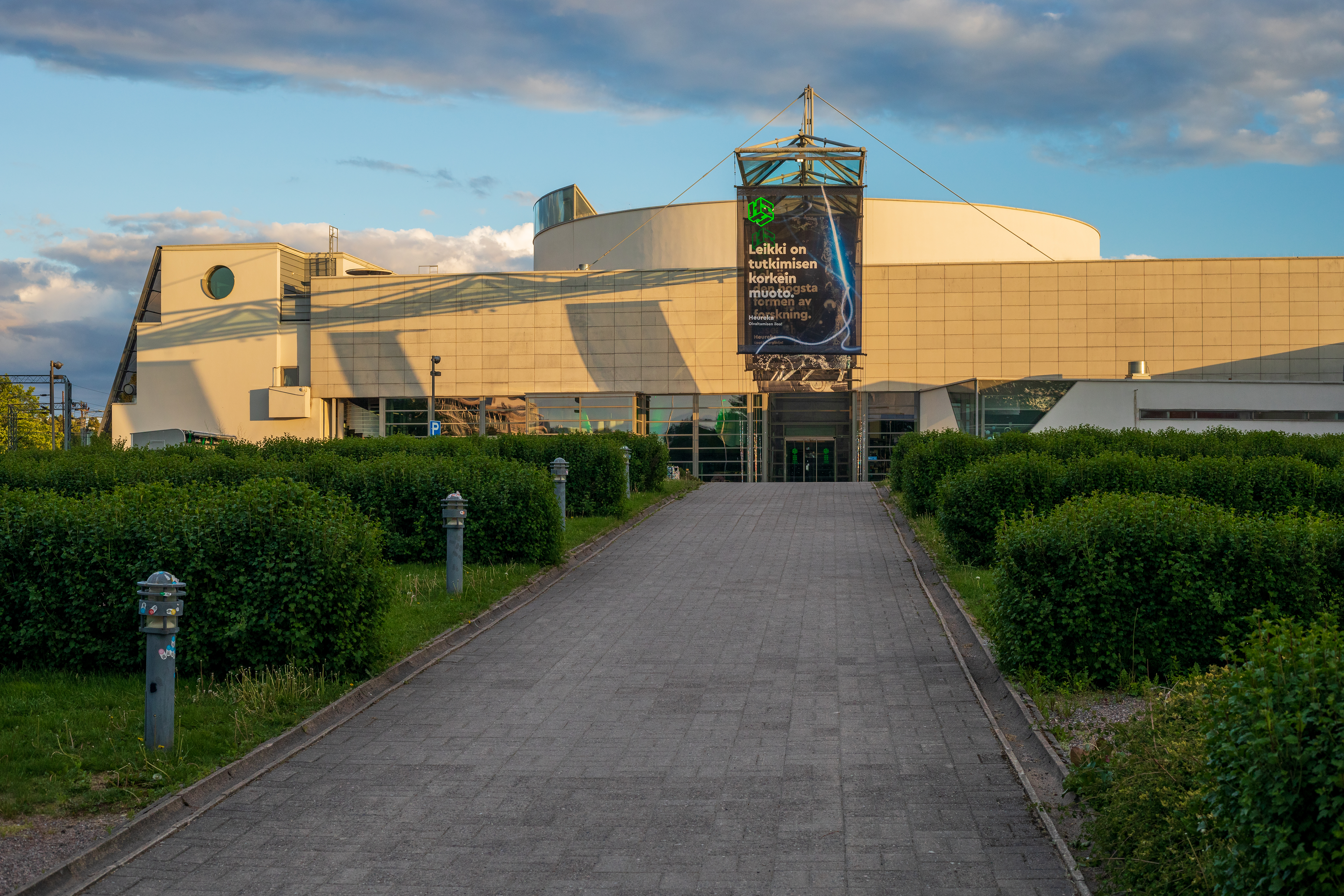
Heureka science center

Finland's largest science center, Heureka, is located in Tikkurila. Opened in 1989, it is a nonprofit organization devoted to popularizing scientific information and to developing the methods used to teach science and scientific concepts. The hemispheric-shaped planetarium primarily presents films dealing with astronomy; until 2007, the theatre was called the Verne Theatre, and it ran super films and multimedia programmes made with special slide projectors that took advantage of the entire 500 m2 surface of the hemispheric screen.

Vantaa City Museum is a museum located in the old station building of Tikkurila railway station. It is operated by the city with free admission, and conducts diverse research and mapping work in co-operation with other parties, for example in connection with the archeology, cultural history and traditions of the urban area. It is used to host exhibitions publishing its own research and studies as well as other works related to the city's history.

Tikkurila also hosts an annual music festival, Tikkurila Festivaali, from July to August.

== Services and facilities ==
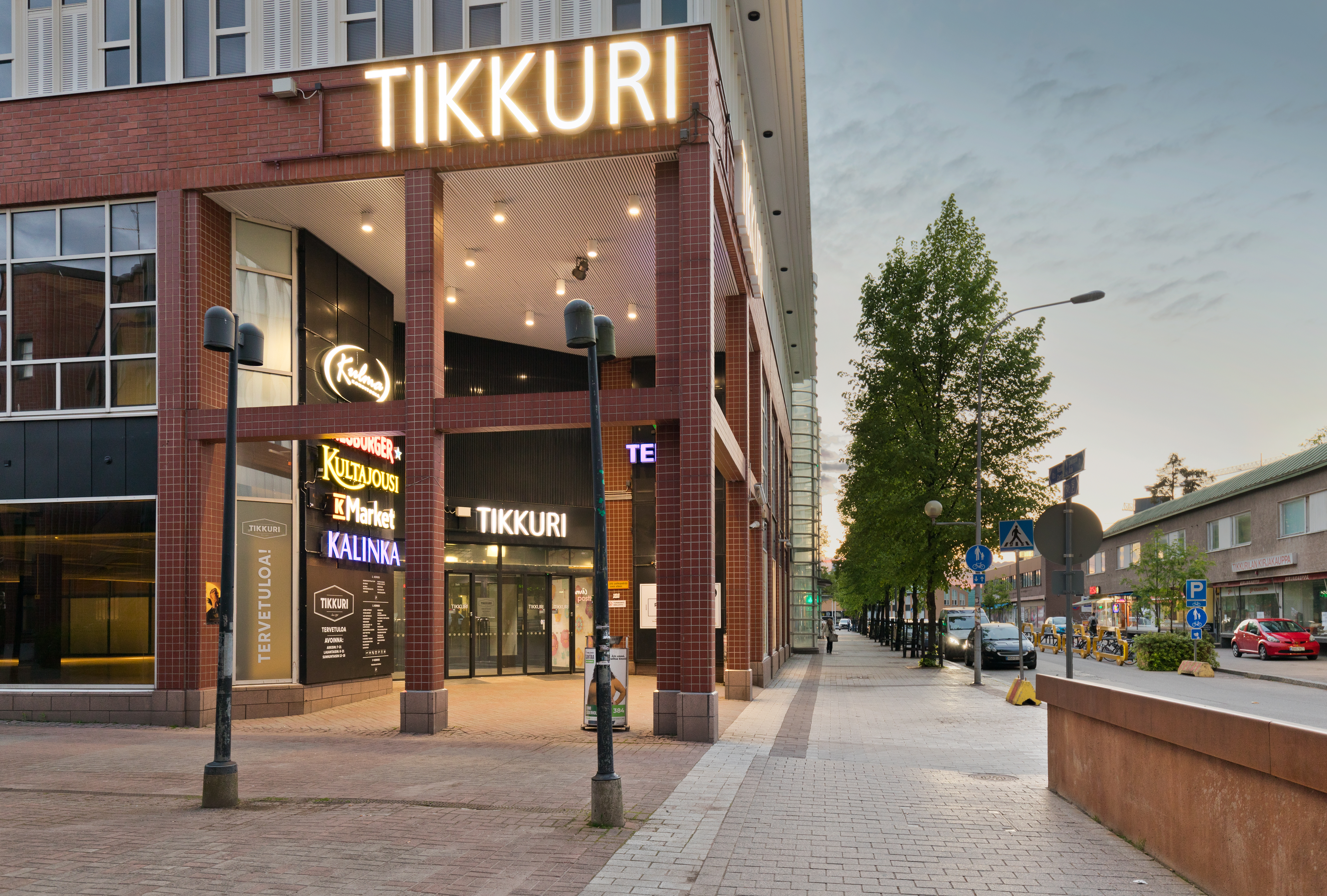
Entrance of the Tikkuri Shopping Centre

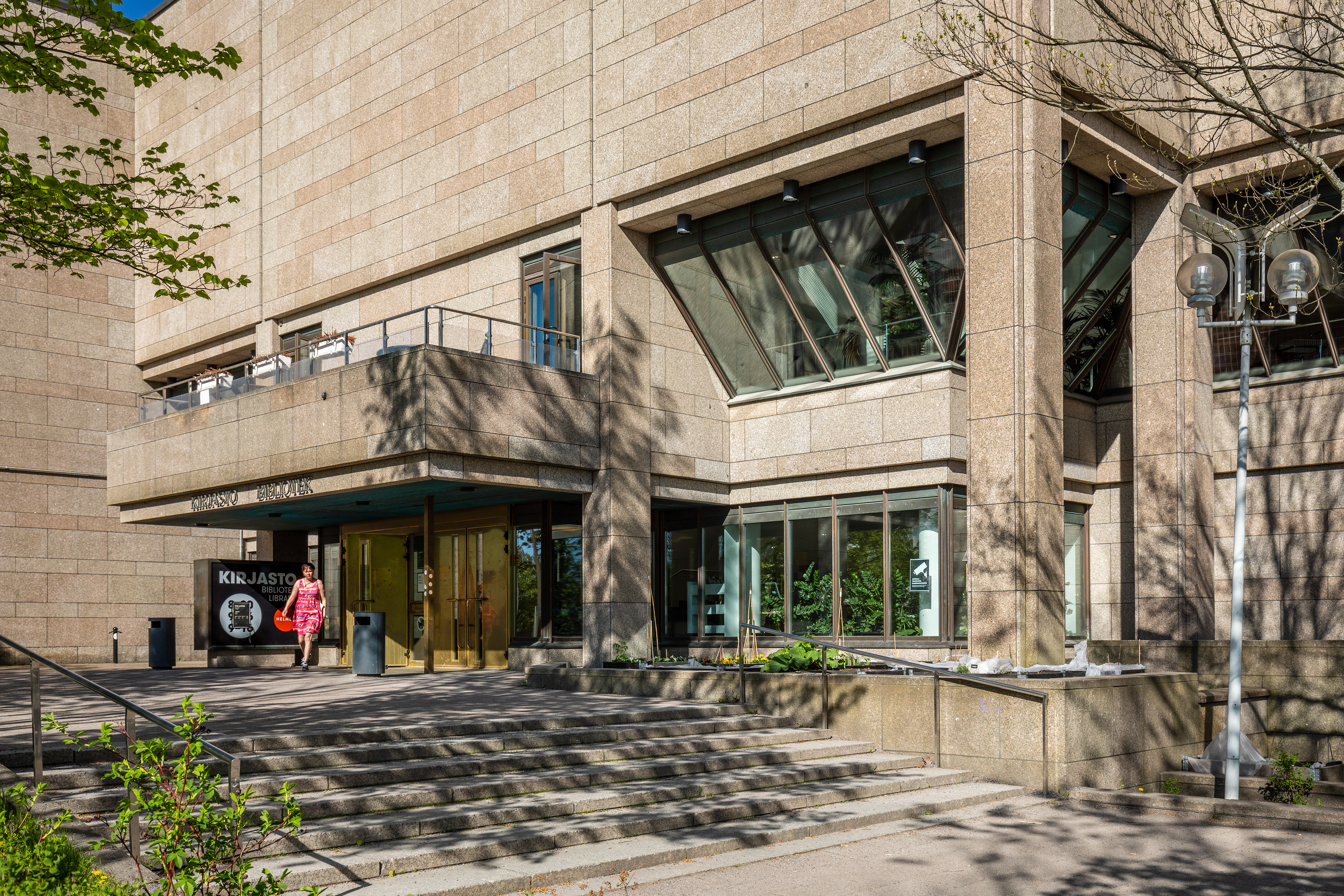
Tikkurila Library

Tikkurila is home to several services and facilities:

- Helsinki Metropolia University Lummetie campus
- Laurea University of Applied Sciences campus
- National Bureau of Investigation headquarters
- Shopping center Dixi at the railway station
- Shopping center Tikkuri
- Tikkurila Library, the main library of Vantaa
- Tikkurila Upper Secondary school, the largest high school in Finland
- Vantaa city hall

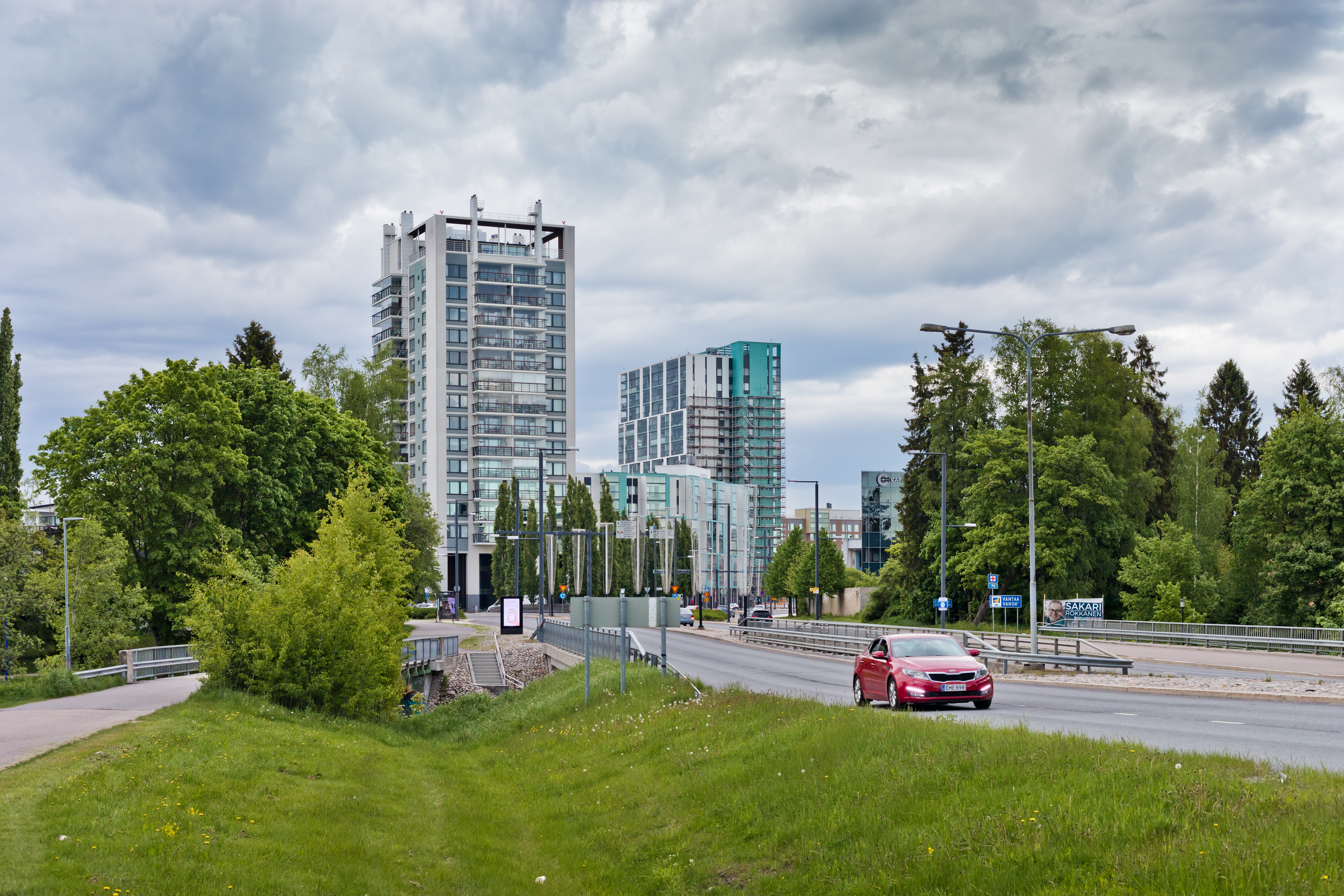
Kielotorni (left) and Sarastus are the tallest buildings in Tikkurila as of 2022

== Transportation ==
Tikkurila railway station is the busiest railway station in Vantaa, and the third busiest in all of Finland (after Helsinki Central and Pasila). Although the Helsinki Airport is not located in the Tikkurila major region, Tikkurila railway station is the nearest mainline station to it, connected by the Ring Rail Line and buses.

Tikkurila railway station connections include:

- Mainline station long-distance trains to most Finnish cities and Russia
- P-train to Helsinki
- K- and N-trains to Helsinki and Kerava
- H-, R-, and T-trains to Helsinki and Riihimäki
- Z-train to Lahti
- I-train to Helsinki Airport

Tikkurila also acts as the central bus station of eastern Vantaa, with connections to Helsinki Airport and almost all residential areas. Buses from Tikkurila also go to Helsinki. Ring III, which runs in the southern part of Tikkurila, is one of the most significant road connections in the area for car traffic.

== See also ==
- Helsinki Parish Village
- Korso
- Myyrmäki
