= Helsinki Airport station =

Railway station in Vantaa, Finland

Lentoasema Flygplatsen Airport
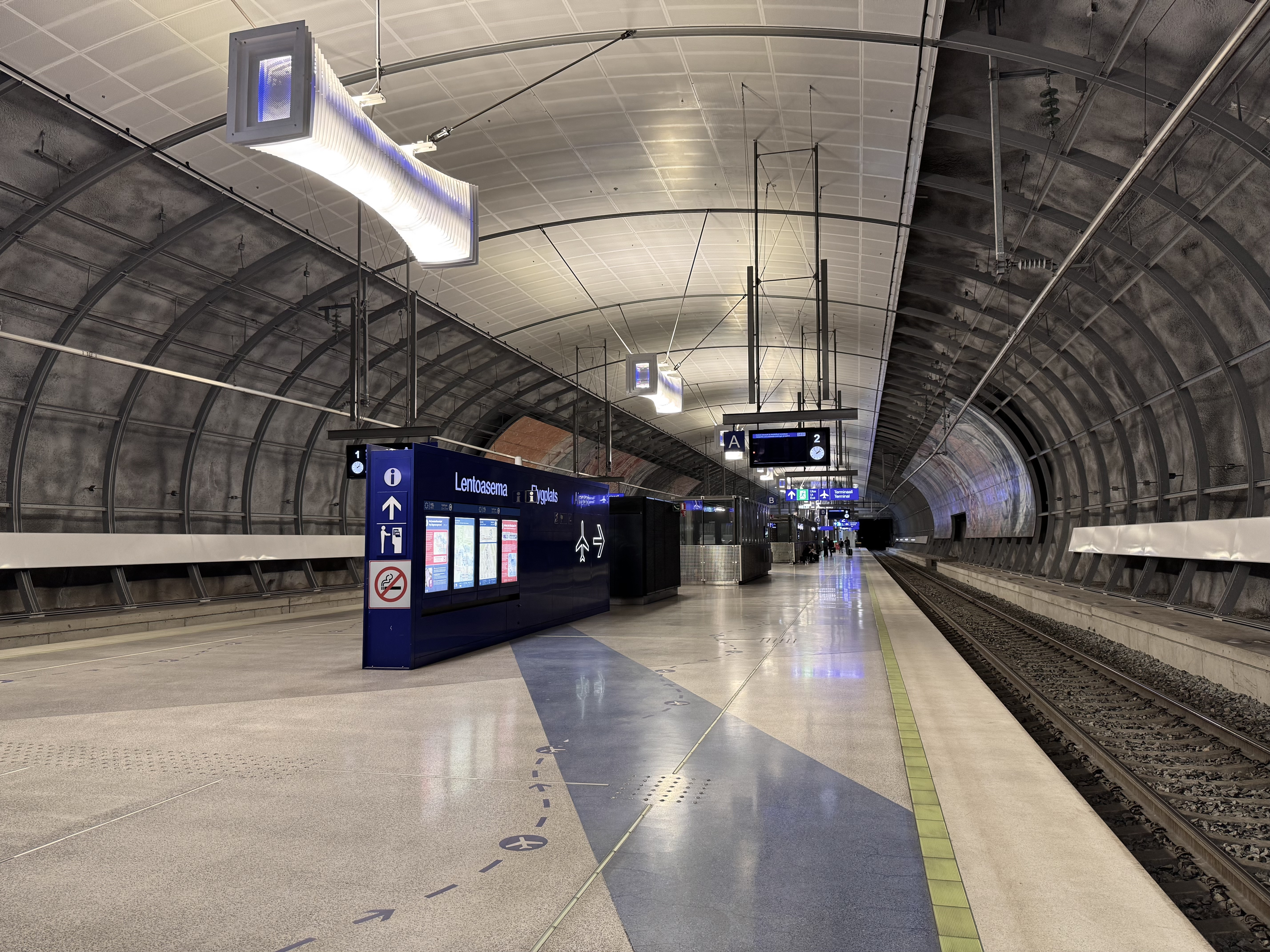

General information
- Location: Helsinki Airport; Lentokenttä, Vantaa, Uusimaa; Finland
- Coordinates: 60°18′58″N 024°58′08″E
- System: Helsinki commuter rail station
- Owner: Finnish Transport Agency
- Line: Ring Rail Line
- Platforms: 1 island platform
- Tracks: 2
- Train operators: VR on behalf of HSL

Construction
- Structure type: tunnel station
- Depth: 45 m (148 ft)

Other information
- Station code: Len
- Fare zone: C

History
- Opened: 1 July 2015

Passengers
- 2019: 4,406,584

Services
Preceding station	Helsinki commuter rail	Following station
Leinelä One-way operation	I counterclockwise via Tikkurila	Aviapolis towards Helsinki
Aviapolis One-way operation	P clockwise via Myyrmäki	Leinelä towards Helsinki
Location

Helsinki Airport station (Finnish: Lentoaseman rautatieasema, Swedish: Flygplatsens järnvägsstation) is a Helsinki commuter rail station located at Helsinki Airport in Vantaa, Finland.

Helsinki Airport station is on the Ring Rail Line, located between the stations of Aviapolis and Leinelä. It is the world's northernmost underground railway station.

== History ==
Although the Ring Rail Line opened on 1 July 2015, the airport railway station opened a few days later on 10 July 2015, and only the Tietotie exit was accessible at this time. Since the exit was the one further away from the terminal, a temporary shuttle bus was operated until the elevators for the passenger terminal-side exit were completed in December 2015. The escalators for the terminal-side exit were finally brought into use on 17 March 2016.

== Future proposals ==
As part of ongoing plans for high-speed rail in Finland, Helsinki Airport station would be linked to Helsinki Central via a direct tunnel (a project known as Lentorata), surfacing at Kerava and continuing to Tampere Central, at an estimated cost of €5.5 billion.

Proposals exist to connect Kouvola railway station to Helsinki via a new 106 km line, Itärata (Eastrail), through Porvoo and Helsinki Airport station.
