= Korso railway station =

Railway station in Vantaa, Finland

Korso
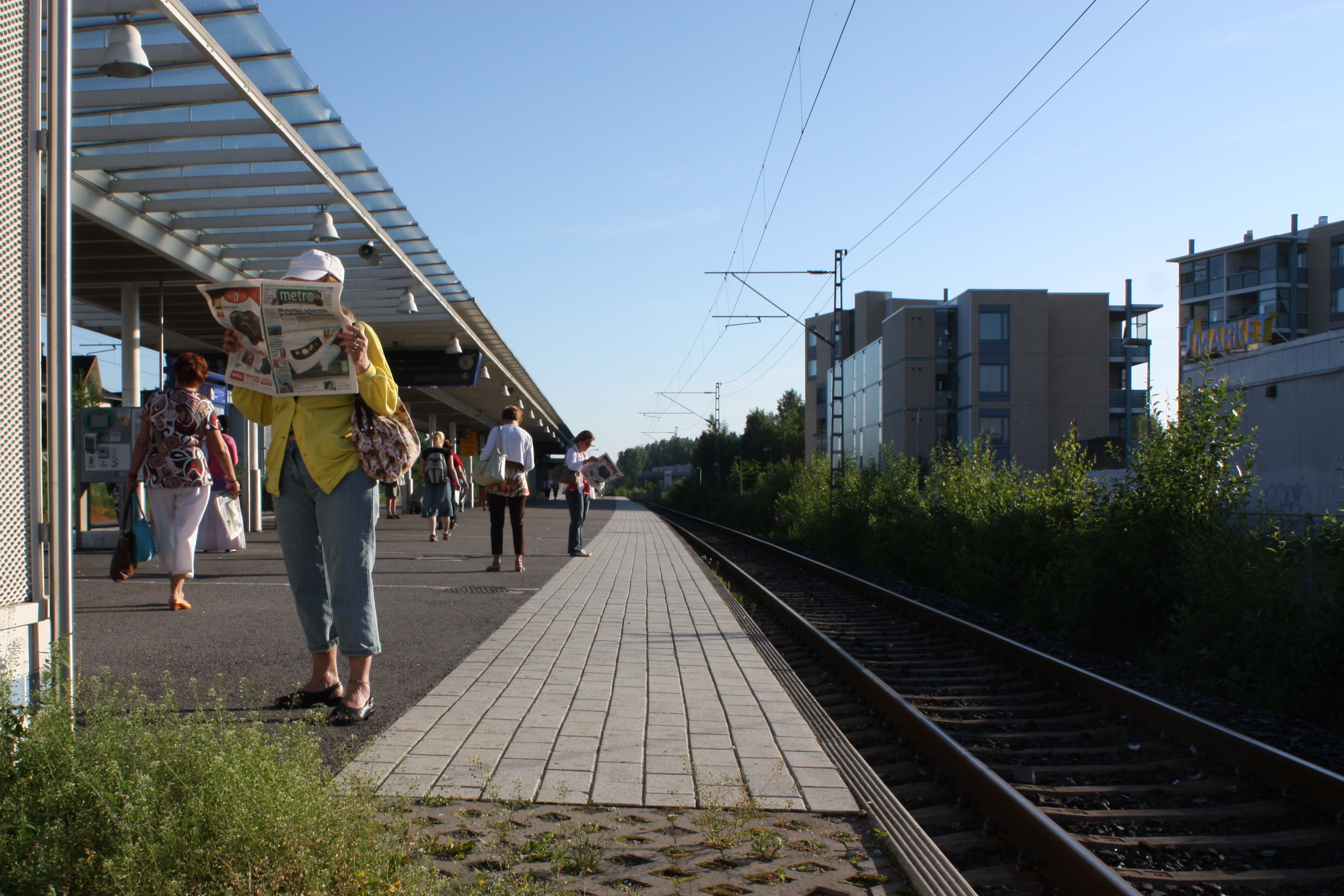

General information
- Location: Metsolantie 2, 01450; Korso, Vantaa, Uusimaa; Finland
- Coordinates: 60°21′05″N 025°04′42″E
- System: Helsinki commuter rail station
- Owner: Finnish Transport Agency
- Line: Helsinki–Riihimäki railway
- Platforms: 1 (island platform)
- Tracks: 2 (with platform); 4 (total)
- Connections: bus lines 587, 631, 633, 633N, 731, 731N, 735, 736, 736A, 739, 961, 961B, 972, 973

Construction
- Structure type: Ground station
- Accessible: 1

Other information
- Station code: Krs
- Fare zone: C

History
- Opened: 1889

Passengers
- 2019: 2,376,952

Services
Preceding station	Helsinki commuter rail	Following station
Rekola towards Helsinki	K	Savio towards Kerava
Preceding station	VR commuter rail	Following station
Rekola towards Helsinki	T	Savio towards Riihimäki
Location

Korso railway station (Finnish: Korson rautatieasema; Swedish: Korso järnvägsstation) is a Helsinki commuter rail station located in the district of Korso in the city of Vantaa, Finland. It is located approximately 22 kilometres (14 mi) from Helsinki Central railway station. The station is located in the C zone of the HSL area.

The Finnish Heritage Agency has classified the old station building and its surroundings as a nationally significant built cultural environment.

== History ==
Korso railway station was originally opened in 1889 as a meeting point for trains, back when the Finnish main line still had only one track. Passenger traffic began the next year. The station received its name from a nearby border post of rural municipalities known as Korsrå.

The original station building was destroyed in a fire in 1918 and replaced by a new one, designed by architect Thure Hellström, the same year. The station building was built with the same designs as Kauhajoki and Teuva stations on the Seinäjoki–Kaskinen railway, but has been modified a number of times since then. The station building is no longer in its original use. The ticket sales office was moved into a retail building located on the other side of the railway line in 1996 and was eventually closed in 2003.

== Connections ==
- K-line trains (Helsinki–Kerava)
- T-line trains (Helsinki–Riihimäki), nighttime

== Departure tracks ==
There are four tracks at Korso railway station, of which two (3, 4) have a platform for passenger trains.

- Track 3 is used by K trains to Kerava and T trains to Riihimäki.
- Track 4 is used by K and T trains to Helsinki.

== Parking ==
The station has a parking hall with 79 spaces (maximum 12 hours). There are about 155 bicycle parking spots in the area.
