= Henna railway station =

Railway station in Orimattila, Finland

Henna
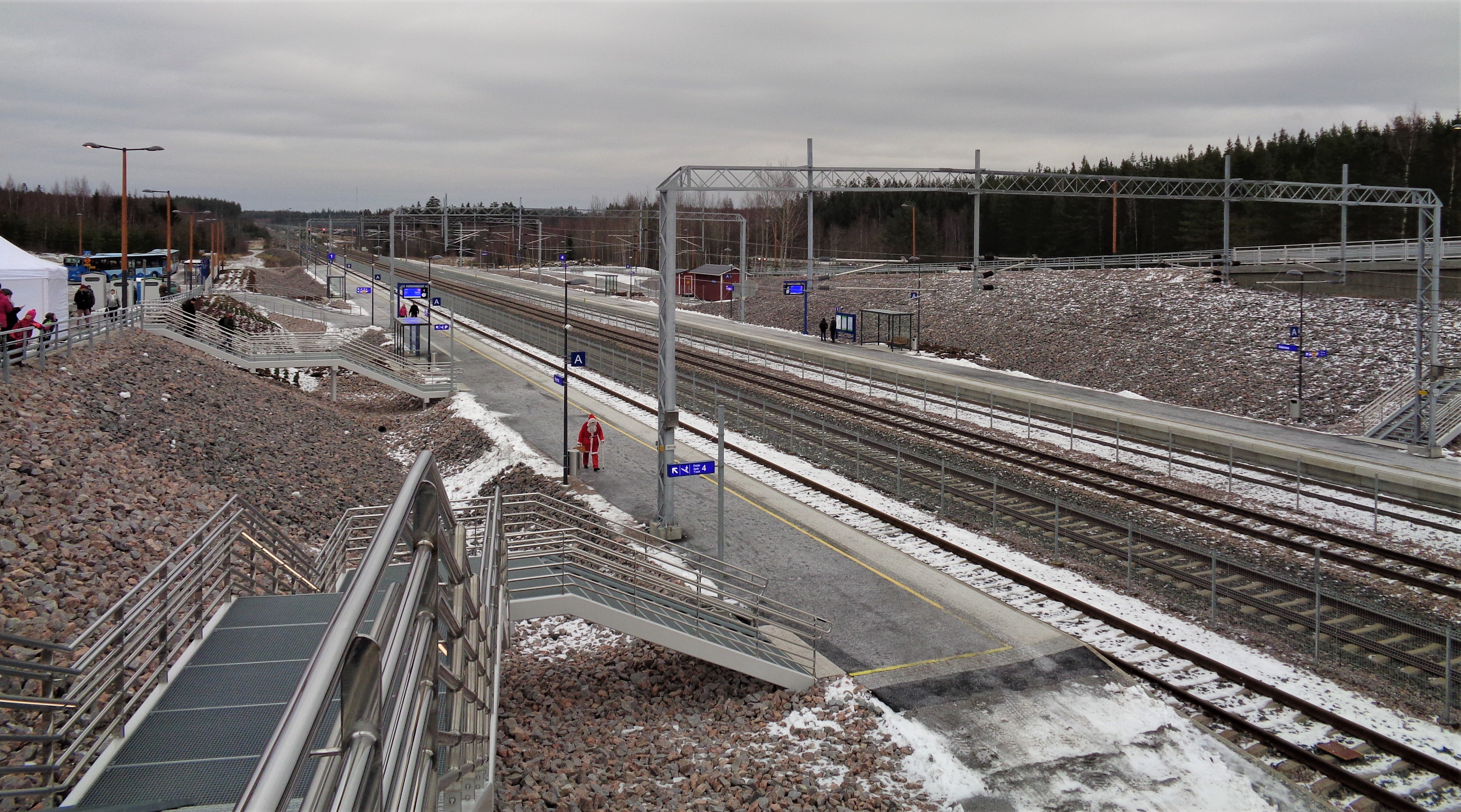
- Henna in 2017, view towards Lahti in the north

General information
- Location: Asemanrinne 1, 16510; Henna, Orimattila; Finland
- Coordinates: 60°47.982′N 025°29.688′E
- System: VR station
- Owner: Finnish Transport Infrastructure Agency
- Operator: VR Group
- Line: Kerava-Lahti
- Platforms: 2 side platforms
- Tracks: 2 (with platforms); 4 (in total)

Other information
- Station code: Hnn
- Classification: Operating point

History
- Opened: 10 December 2017
- Former names: Lähdemäki (until 25 March 2017)

Services
Preceding station	VR commuter rail	Following station
Mäntsälä towards Helsinki	Z	Lahti towards Lahti or Kouvola
Location

Henna railway station (Finnish: Hennan rautatieasema, Swedish: Henna järnvägsstation) is located in the town of Orimattila, Finland, in the district of Henna. It is located along the Kerava–Lahti railway, and its neighboring stations are Lahti in the north and Mäntsälä in the south.

== History ==
In 2012, the town of Orimattila and the Finnish Transport Infrastructure Agency signed a letter of intent as well as a planning agreement about the possibility of building a new halt in the town district of Henna. In the long term, the town plans to develop Henna into an urban area with accommodation for around 2,300–5,500 jobs and 6,400–15,400 residents.

The station was opened on 12 October 2017, and an official inauguration ceremony was held on the same day, in which Minister of Transportation and Communications Anne Berner was present. The new halt increased the travel time of commuter trains between Lahti and Helsinki by approximately 3 minutes, with minimal effects on freight train schedules. As of 2019, the station served under 100 passengers daily.

== Services ==
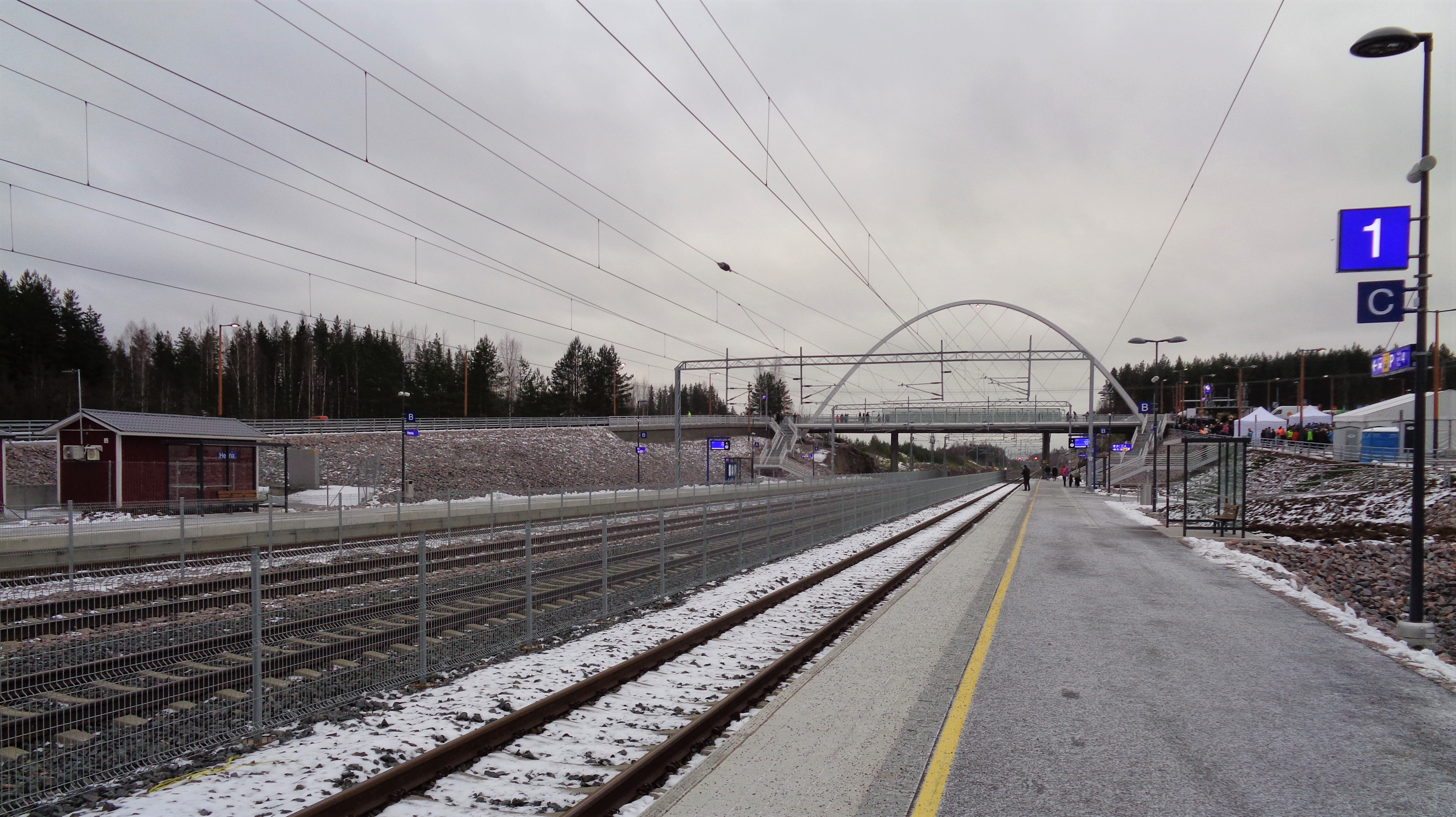
Henna in 2017, view towards Mäntsälä and Kerava in the south

Henna is served by VR commuter rail line Z on the route Helsinki–Lahti. During rush hours, the route extends further eastwards to Kouvola: two Z trains depart from Kouvola in the morning and return there in the evening rush hour. This service is also operated once in the direction Helsinki–Kouvola at midnight. Southbound trains toward Helsinki use track 1, while northbound trains toward Lahti and Kouvola use track 4. Tracks 2 and 3 have no platforms and are only used by long-distance trains that pass through the station.

A VR ticket vending machine, as well as 55 centimetres (22 in) high platforms enabling accessible entry to low-floor trains, are present at the station.
