= Ainola railway station =

Railway station in Järvenpää, Finland

Ainola
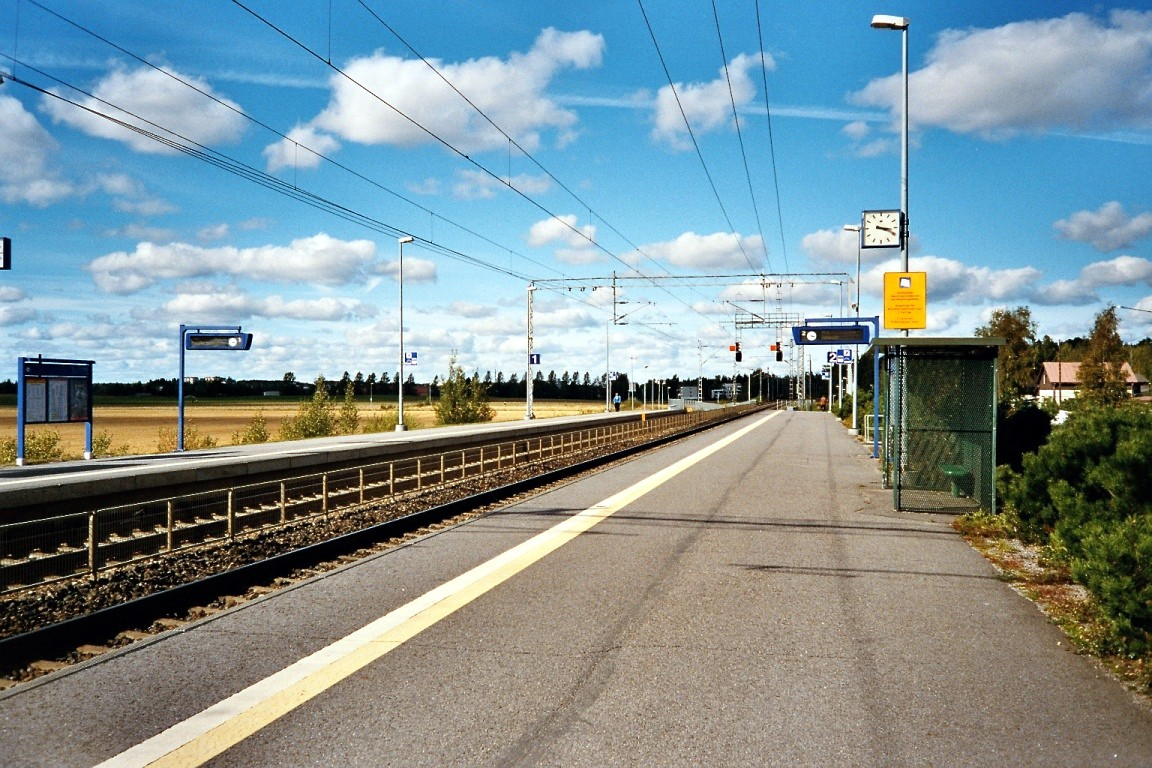

General information
- Location: Horsmakatu 1, 04420; Kyrölä, Järvenpää; Finland
- Coordinates: 60.4570°N 25.1016°E
- Owner: Finnish Transport Infrastructure Agency
- Operator: VR Group
- Line: Helsinki–Riihimäki
- Platforms: 2 side platforms

Construction
- Structure type: At-grade

Other information
- Station code: Ain
- Fare zone: E
- Classification: Part of split operating point (Järvenpää)

History
- Opened: 1 September 1949
- Former names: Kyrölä (until 1 June 2015)

Passengers
- 2015: 927 daily

Services
Preceding station	VR commuter rail	Following station
Kerava towards Helsinki	R	Järvenpää towards Riihimäki or Tampere
Kerava towards Helsinki	T	Järvenpää towards Riihimäki
Location

Ainola railway station (Finnish: Ainolan rautatieasema, Swedish: Ainola järnvägsstation), formerly Kyrölä railway station, is a Helsinki commuter rail station in the town of Järvenpää, Finland. The station is served by Helsinki commuter rail R and T line trains.

The station was renamed Ainola on 1 June 2015 to celebrate the 150th anniversary of the composer Jean Sibelius. Ainola was his and his wife Aino's home. The walk from the station to Ainola takes around 20 minutes. In 2025 the station was rebuilt completely as the rail section Kytömaa-Ainola has 2 new tracks being built to help InterCity trains not be stuck behind commuter rail trains/freight/ECS.

== Departure tracks ==
There are four tracks at Ainola railway station, of which two (1, 4) have a platform for passenger trains. Tracks 2–3 are used by long-distance trains that skip the station.

- Track 1 is used by R and T trains to Helsinki.
- Track 4 is used by R and T trains to Riihimäki or Tampere.
