= Saunakallio railway station =

Railway station in Järvenpää, Finland

Saunakallio
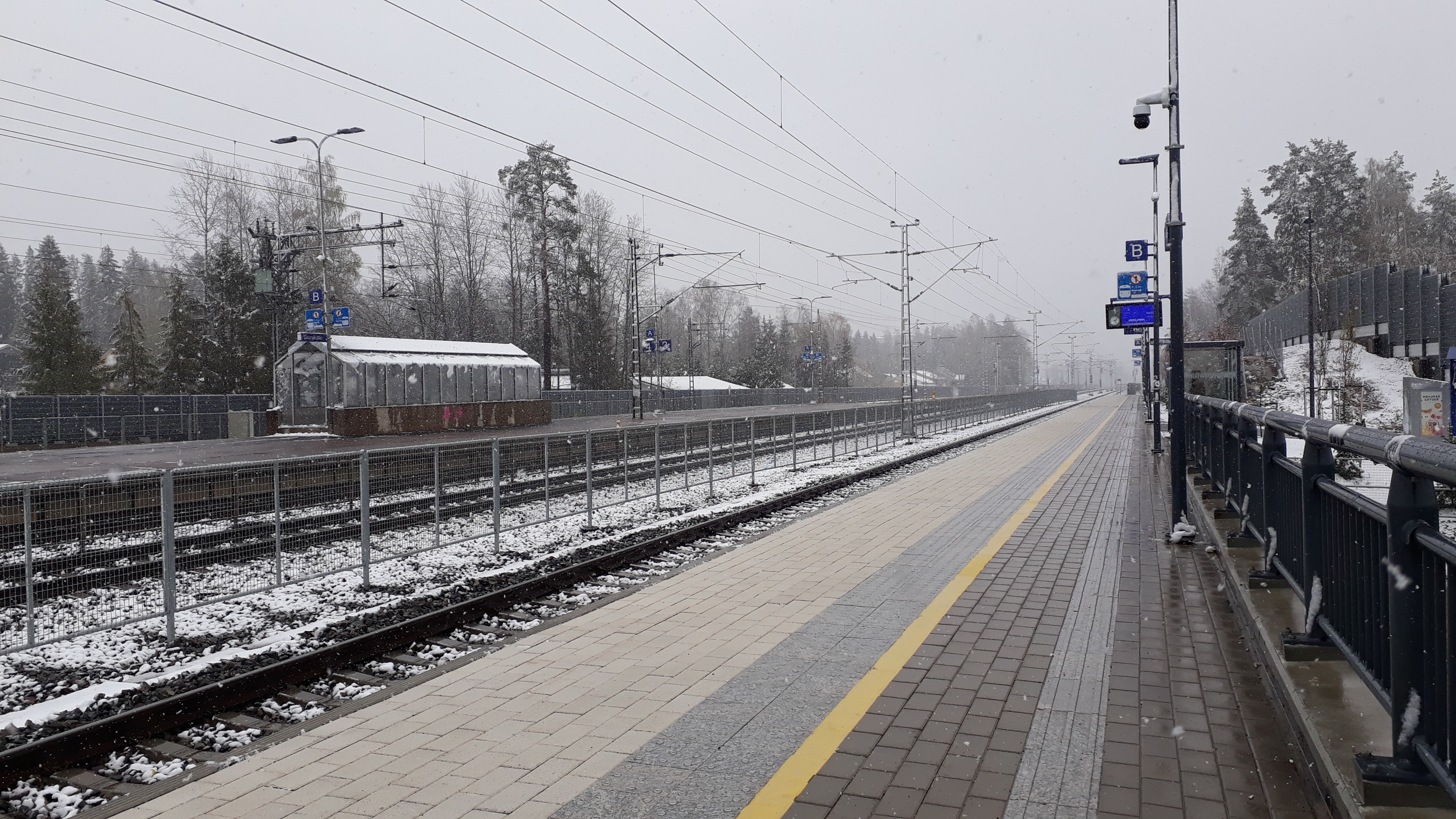

General information
- Location: Ristikatu 1, 04440; Saunakallio, Järvenpää; Finland
- Coordinates: 60.4874°N 25.0656°E
- Owner: Finnish Transport Infrastructure Agency
- Operator: VR Group
- Line: Helsinki–Riihimäki
- Tracks: 4 with platforms

Construction
- Structure type: At-grade

Other information
- Station code: Sau
- Fare zone: E
- Classification: Part of split operating point (Järvenpää)

History
- Opened: 16 August 1948

Passengers
- 2015: 858 daily

Services
Preceding station	VR commuter rail	Following station
Järvenpää towards Helsinki	R	Jokela towards Riihimäki or Tampere
Järvenpää towards Helsinki	T	Jokela towards Riihimäki
Location

Saunakallio railway station (Finnish: Saunakallion rautatieasema, Swedish: Saunakallio järnvägsstation) is a Helsinki commuter rail station in the town of Järvenpää, Finland, 39 km (24.5 mi) north from the Helsinki Central railway station. Commuter trains R and T stop at the station.

The station was the terminus for the G commuter line that ran from Helsinki to Saunakallio. The service was started on 4 June 2007. It was discontinued in 2011 in order to improve management of traffic and timetable keeping on the Main Line especially during winter conditions.

== Departure tracks ==
Saunakallio railway station has four tracks out of which tracks 1, 3 and 4 have a platform. Track 2 is used by southbound long-distance trains that skip the station meanwhile northbound long-distance trains that skip the station use track 3. Track 5 (formerly track 4, until 2019) was the departure track of the G trains to Helsinki in 2007–2011.

- Track 1 is used by commuter trains R and T to Helsinki.
- Track 4 is used by commuter trains R and T to Riihimäki.
