= Mäntsälä railway station =

Railway station in Mäntsälä, Finland

Mäntsälä
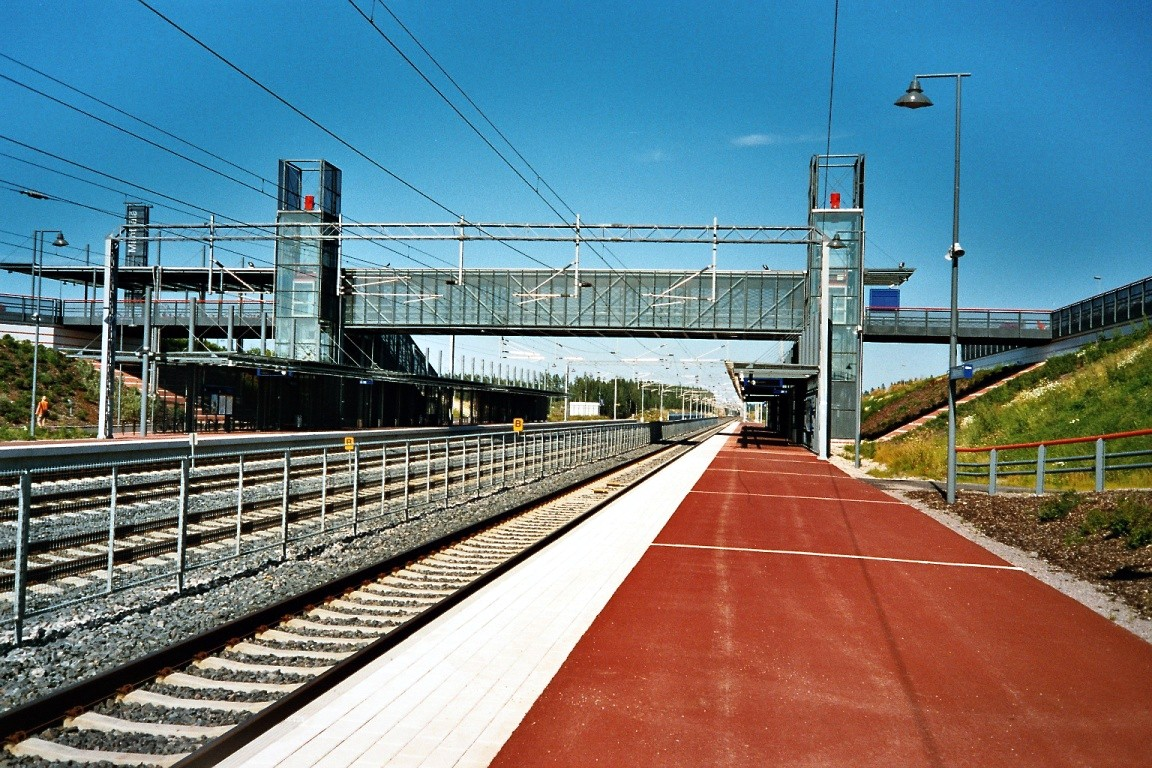

General information
- Location: Asemakatu 1, 04600; Mäntsälä; Finland
- Coordinates: 60°38′51″N 025°18′27″E
- System: VR station
- Owner: Finnish Transport Infrastructure Agency
- Operator: VR Group
- Line: Kerava–Lahti
- Platforms: 2 side platforms
- Tracks: 2 (with platforms); 4 (in total)

Construction
- Structure type: At-grade

Other information
- Station code: Mlä
- Classification: Operating point

History
- Opened: 3 September 2006; 19 years ago

Passengers
- 2015: 1,544 daily

Services
Preceding station	VR commuter rail	Following station
Haarajoki towards Helsinki	Z	Henna towards Lahti or Kouvola
Location

Mäntsälä railway station (Finnish: Mäntsälän rautatieasema, Swedish: Mäntsälä järnvägsstation) is located in the town of Mäntsälä, Finland, approximately 60 kilometres (40 mi) from Helsinki Central railway station.

The station was opened on 3 September 2006 as part of the new Kerava-Lahti railway line, and is served by the Z-trains which run on this route.

== Services ==
- Z commuter trains (Helsinki – Pasila – Tikkurila – Kerava – Haarajoki – Mäntsälä – Henna – Lahti)
  - Additional stops following Lahti during rush hours and late at night: Villähde – Nastola – Uusikylä – Kausala – Koria – Kouvola

== Departure tracks ==
There are four tracks at Mäntsälä railway station, of which two (1, 4) have platforms for passenger trains. Tracks 2–3 are used by long-distance trains that skip the station.

- Track 1 is used by Z trains to Helsinki.
- Track 4 is used by Z trains to Lahti.
