= Savio railway station =

Railway station in Kerava, Finland

Savio
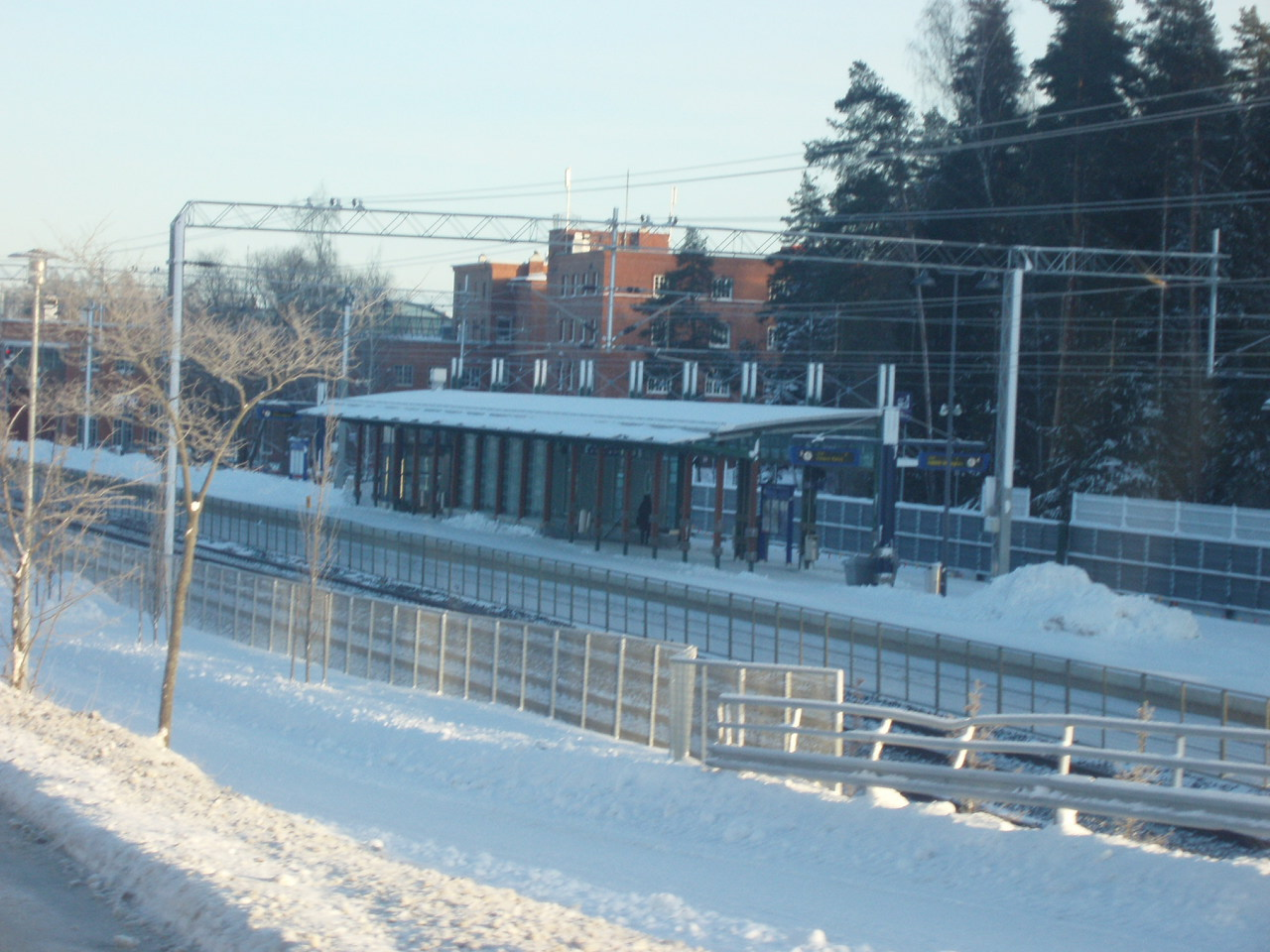

General information
- Location: Saviontie 80, 04260; Savio, Kerava; Finland
- Coordinates: 60°22′53″N 025°05′52″E
- System: Helsinki commuter rail station
- Owner: Finnish Transport Agency
- Line: Helsinki–Riihimäki railway
- Platforms: 1 island platform
- Connections: Helsinki buses

Construction
- Structure type: ground station
- Accessible: 1

Other information
- Fare zone: D
- Classification: Halt

History
- Opened: 1886

Passengers
- 2019: 770,682

Services
Preceding station	Helsinki commuter rail	Following station
Korso towards Helsinki	K	Kerava Terminus
Preceding station	VR commuter rail	Following station
Korso towards Helsinki	T	Kerava towards Riihimäki
Location

Savio railway station (Finnish: Savion rautatieasema, Swedish: Savio järnvägsstation) is located in the district of Savio in the city of Kerava, Finland. It is located between the stations of Korso and Kerava, and serves the K line between Helsinki and Kerava, as well as the T line from Helsinki to Riihimäki (at night only).

== Departure tracks ==
There are four tracks at Savio railway station, of which two (3, 4) have a platform for passenger trains.

- Track 3 is used by K trains to Kerava and T trains to Riihimäki.
- Track 4 is used by K and T trains to Helsinki.
