= Kerava–Vuosaari railway =

Freight railway line in Helsinki, Finland

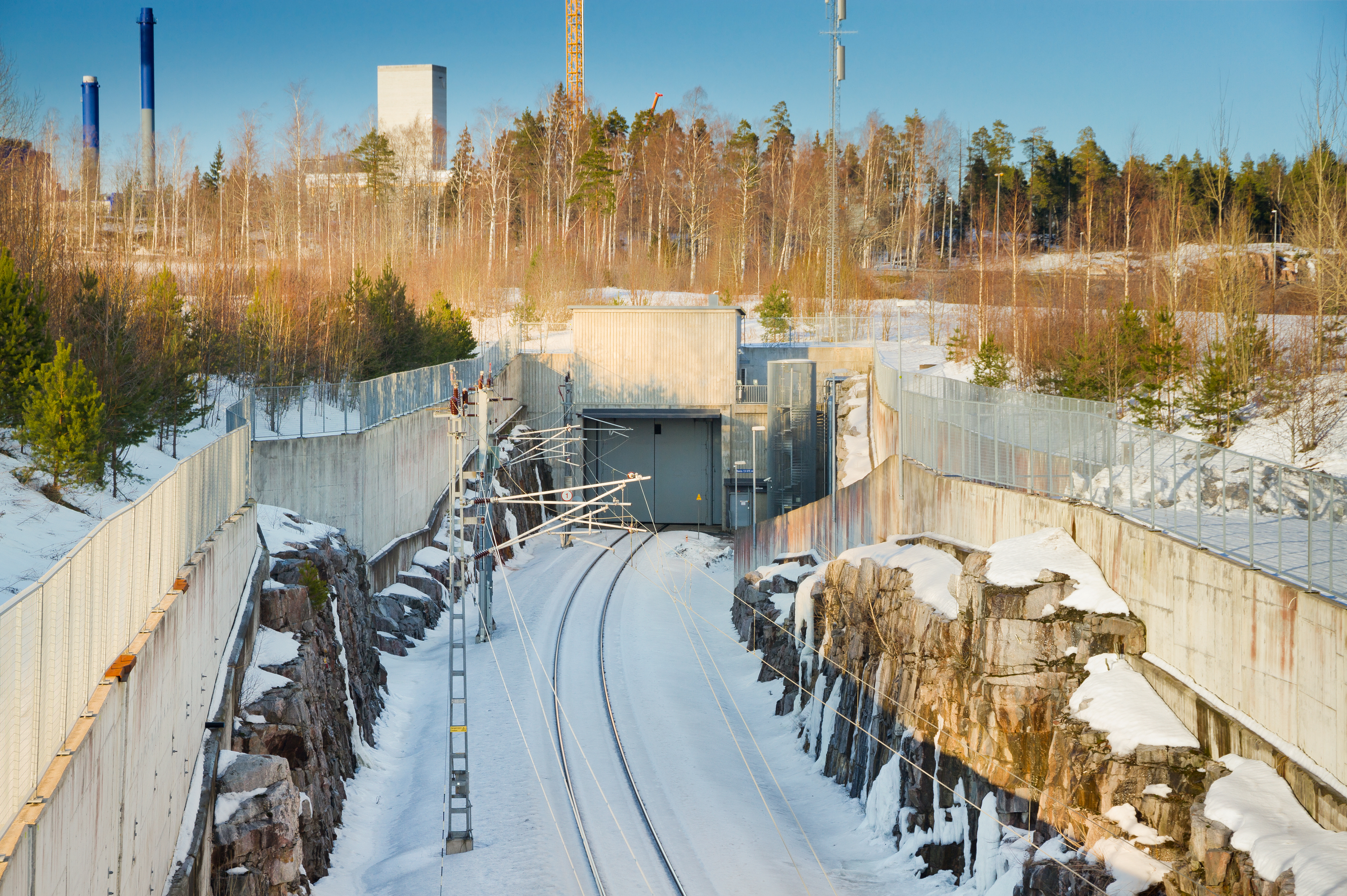
- The entrance to the Savio rail tunnel

Overview
- Locale: Helsinki, Finland

History
- Opened: 28 November 2008

Technical
- Line length: 19 km (12 mi)
- Track gauge: 1,524 mm (5 ft)
- Electrification: 25 kV 50 Hz AC
- Operating speed: 80 km/h (50 mph)

The Kerava–Vuosaari railway links the Vuosaari harbour in Helsinki, Finland to the Finnish Main Line. The line branches off the Main Line at Kerava railway station and runs alongside it until diverging from it south of Savio railway station. It only sees freight services and is electrified. The line is home to the Savio rail tunnel, the longest railway tunnel in Finland.

The Helsinki Metro has a service connection to the national railway network at Vuosaari.
