= Z Train =

Z Train may refer to:

- J/Z (New York City Subway service), United States
- Z train, Helsinki commuter rail, Finland
