= Kerava–Lahti railway =

Railway line in Finland

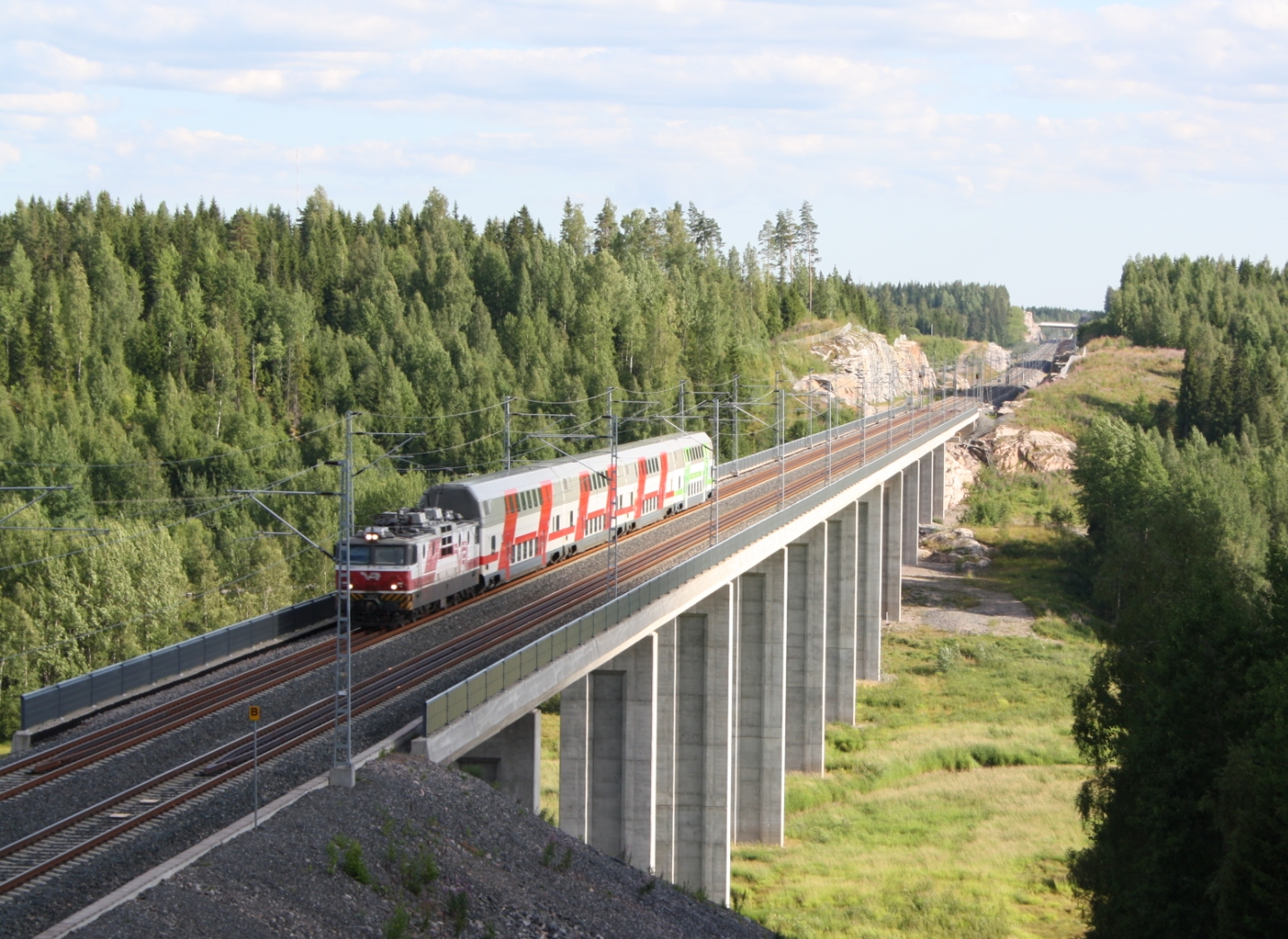
- A loco-hauled Intercity train crossing the Luhdanmäki railway bridge, part of the Kerava–Lahti railway, in July 2010.

Overview
- Owner: Finnish Transport Infrastructure Agency
- Locale: Southern Finland
- Termini: Kerava; Lahti
- Stations: 3

Service
- Operator(s): VR, Fenniarail

History
- Opened: 3 September 2006

Technical
- Line length: 75.7 km (47.0 mi)
- Number of tracks: Double track
- Track gauge: 1,524 mm (5 ft)
- Electrification: 25 kV @ 50 Hz
- Operating speed: 120 to 220 km/h (75 to 137 mph)
- Train protection system: ATP-VR/RHK

The Kerava–Lahti railway line or Lahden oikorata (Lahti direct line) is a railway line in southern Finland between the towns of Kerava and Lahti, which opened on 3 September 2006.

== History ==
In 1990, the Ministry of Transport commissioned a study regarding the construction of a new line connecting Helsinki with eastern Finland, prompted by the capacity problems of the Helsinki–Riihimäki railway. Three main routes for the new connection were proposed: Helsinki–Lahti–Mikkeli, Helsinki–Kouvola, and Helsinki–Kotka–Hamina–Luumäki. All three options were deemed superior to the alternative of simply upgrading the existing lines. The Kotka option was found to be the least economically viable of the three, while those of Lahti and Kouvola were found to be about equal in this respect. The study was completed in 1992, favoring the Lahti option.

The construction of the Kerava–Lahti railway line took four years and cost €331 million. At the time it was the first new passenger railway to be opened in Finland since completion of the Jämsänkoski–Jyväskylä line in 1977, reducing the journey time between Kerava and Lahti by 26 kilometres. Funding was provided by the Finnish government and the European Union, with the route forming part of the EU's "Nordic Triangle" TEN-T strategic transport route.

== Services ==
The line is used as a shortcut for services from Helsinki to eastern Finnish cities including Kouvola, Kuopio and Joensuu, which all used the line to Riihimäki prior to the construction of the Kerava–Lahti line. The Z train of the Helsinki commuter rail also uses the line, as well as the Allegro international high-speed train operated between Finland and Russia from 2010–2022.

== Future ==
Proposals exist to build a similar direct railway line from Helsinki Central to Kouvola via Helsinki Airport and Porvoo (known as Itärata), which would handle traffic to eastern Finnish cities such as Kuopio, Joensuu, Lappeenranta and Mikkeli, providing a shorter journey time between Helsinki and these cities than currently offered by the Kerava-Lahti line.

== Stations ==
- Haarajoki
- Mäntsälä
- Henna

== See also ==
- Helsinki commuter rail
- List of railway lines in Finland
- Rail transport in Finland
