= Kerava railway station =

Railway station in Kerava, Finland

Kerava Kervo
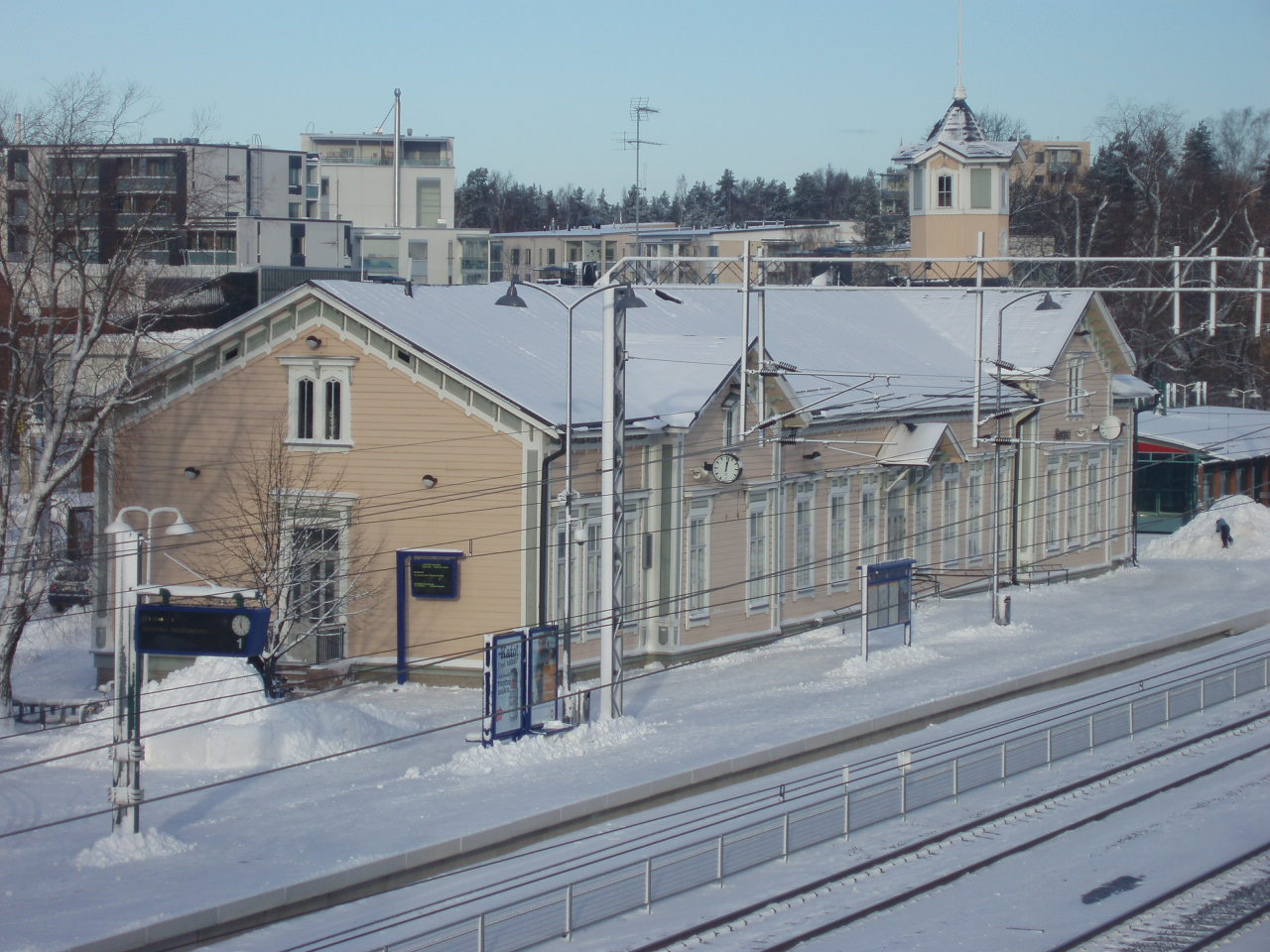

General information
- Location: Asema-aukio 1, 04200; Kerava; Finland
- Coordinates: 60°24′12″N 25°6′20″E
- System: Helsinki commuter rail station
- Owner: Finnish Transport Agency
- Platforms: 1 island platform 2 side platforms

Construction
- Accessible: 2

Other information
- Station code: Ke
- Fare zone: D

Passengers
- 2019: 4,632,122 (Helsinki commuter)

Services
Preceding station	Helsinki commuter rail	Following station
Savio towards Helsinki	K	Terminus
Preceding station	VR commuter rail	Following station
Tikkurila towards Helsinki	R	Ainola towards Riihimäki or Tampere
Tikkurila towards Helsinki	D	Järvenpää towards Riihimäki or Hämeenlinna
Savio towards Helsinki	T	Ainola towards Riihimäki
Tikkurila towards Helsinki	Z	Haarajoki towards Lahti or Kouvola
Location

Kerava railway station (Finnish: Keravan rautatieasema, Swedish: Kervo järnvägsstation) is located in the town of Kerava, Finland. It is located approximately 29 kilometres (18 mi) from Helsinki Central railway station. Six tracks run through the station, three of which have platforms for passenger traffic. Kerava is a significant junction station, with connections from the main track from Helsinki to Riihimäki to the tracks to Lahti, Sköldvik, Porvoo, and to the Vuosaari Harbour.

The station house is uncommonly large and was built in 1876−1878 and extended in 1904. When the house was built the station had already been operational for over ten years.

The Finnish Heritage Agency has classified Kerava railway station as a nationally significant built cultural environment.

== History ==
Kerava railway station was opened in 1863 and the first station building was built the same year, but it soon ended up being way too small for the station. The current Renaissance Revival style station, designed by architect Knut Nylander, was built in 1876−1878 and expanded in 1904.

Kerava became a junction station in 1874, as the Kerava−Porvoo line was opened. In September 2006, a new railway line to Lahti starting from the Kytömaa station at the northern side of Kerava station was opened. The Vuosaari harbour rail line opened in 2009.

The railyard has been modified several times, last time in 2000−2001. Freight traffic at the station ceased in 2002.

== Services ==
Kerava is served by a total of five lines on the Helsinki commuter rail network: K from Helsinki, for which it is the terminus; R, D and T on the route Helsinki−Riihimäki−Hämeenlinna−Tampere; and Z on the route Helsinki−Lahti−Kouvola. No long-distance services make stops at Kerava.

== Departure tracks ==
There are six tracks at Kerava railway station, out of which tracks 1, 4, 5 and 6 have a platform for passenger trains. Tracks 2 and 3 are used by long-distance trains that skip the station.

- Track 1 is used by commuter trains D, R and Z to Helsinki.
- Track 4 is used by commuter trains D, R and T to Riihimäki as well as Z to Lahti.
- Track 5 is used by commuter trains K and T to Helsinki.
- Track 6 is used by museum train services to Porvoo. Otherwise this track is not normally used by passenger trains.

== Gallery ==
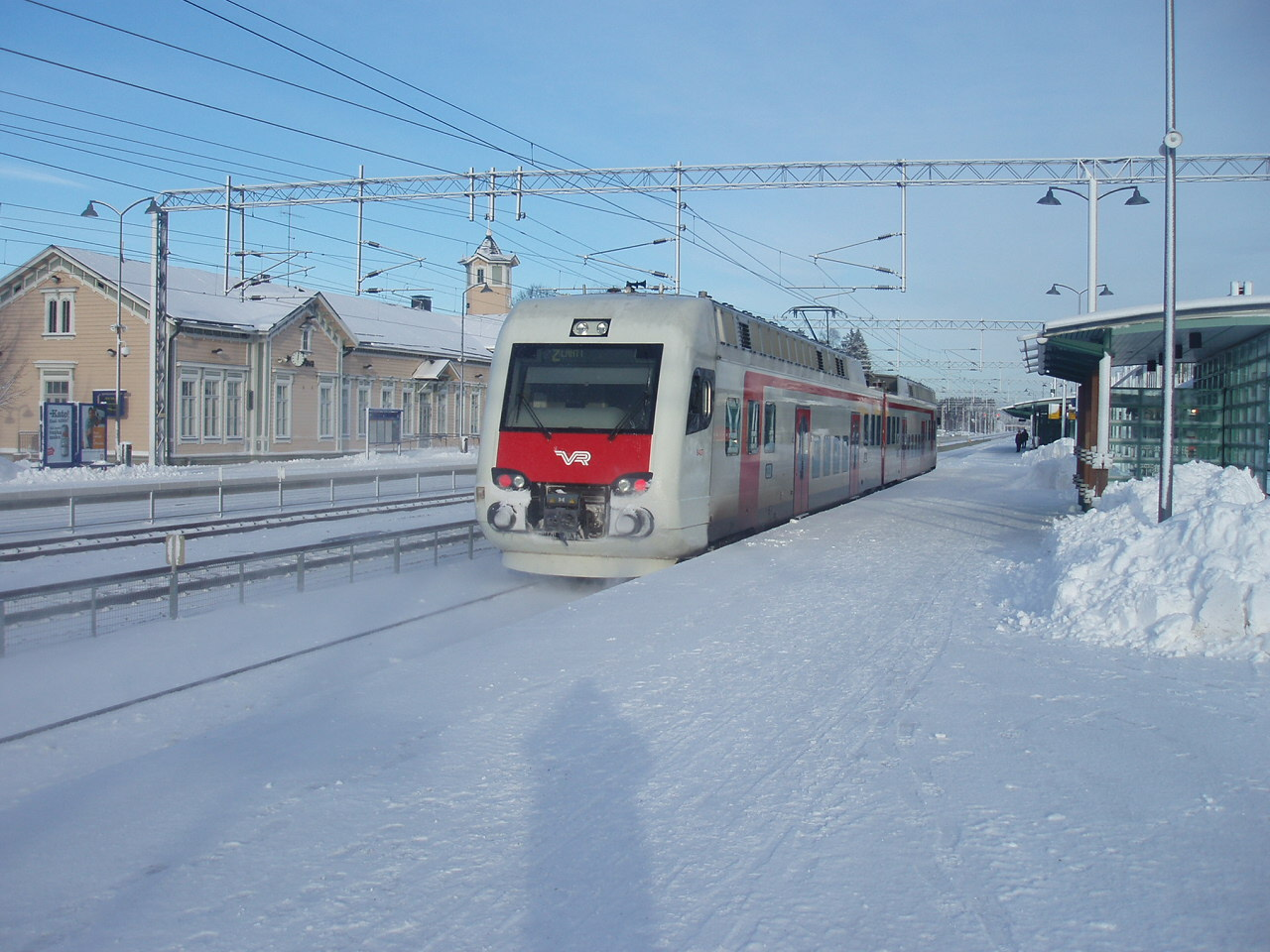
A northbound Z-line train in track four.

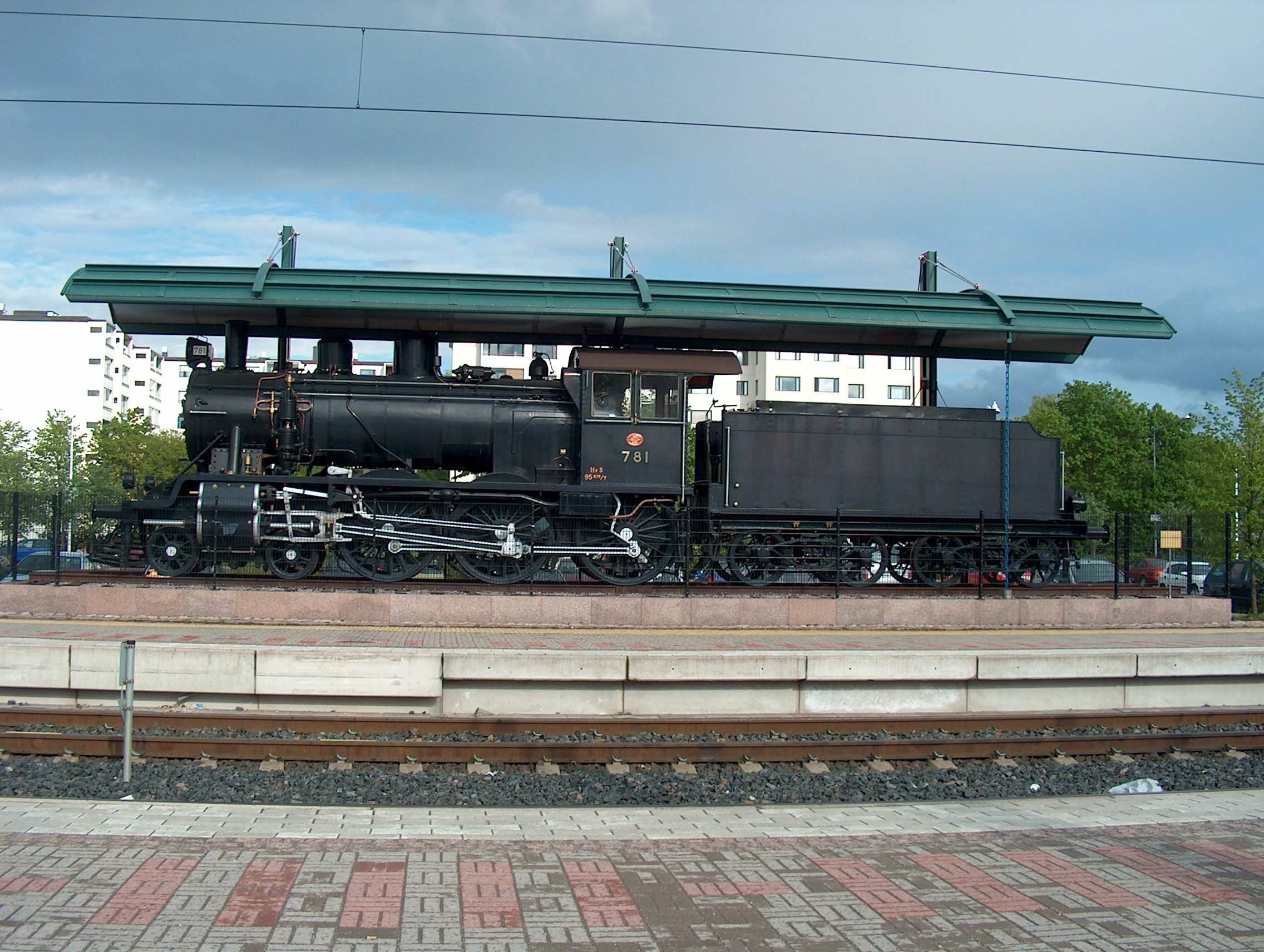
This Hv3 number 781 stands at the railway station of Kerava
