= Järvenpää railway station =

Railway station in Järvenpää, Finland

Järvenpää Träskända
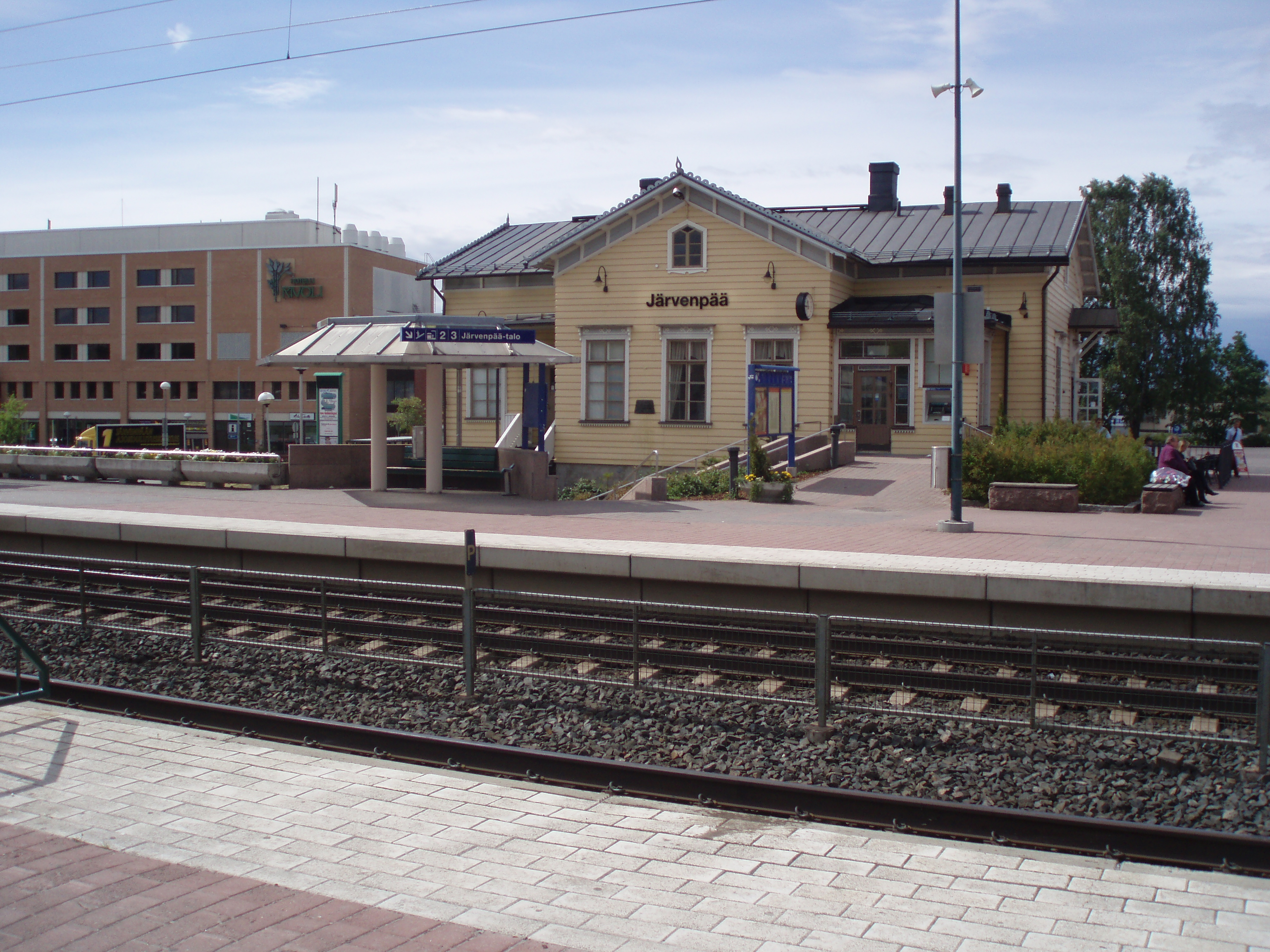

General information
- Location: Asema-aukio 1, 04400; Keskusta, Järvenpää; Finland
- Coordinates: 60°28′26″N 25°5′25″E
- Owner: Finnish Transport Infrastructure Agency
- Operator: VR Group
- Line: Helsinki–Riihimäki
- Platforms: 1 side platform 1 island platform

Construction
- Structure type: At-grade

Other information
- Station code: Jp
- Fare zone: E
- Classification: Part of split operating point (Järvenpää)

History
- Opened: 17 March 1862; 164 years ago

Passengers
- 2015: 9,227 daily

Services
Preceding station	VR commuter rail	Following station
Ainola towards Helsinki	R	Saunakallio towards Riihimäki or Tampere
Ainola towards Helsinki	T	Saunakallio towards Riihimäki
Tikkurila towards Helsinki	D	Hyvinkää towards Riihimäki or Hämeenlinna
Location

Järvenpää railway station (Finnish: Järvenpään rautatieasema, Swedish: Träskända järnvägsstation) is a railway station in Järvenpää about 37 kilometres (23 mi) north from Helsinki Central station. It is situated 200 metres (660 ft) northeast of the city centre on a small hill. Commuter trains D, R and T stop at the station.

Next to the station is the Järvenpää taxi rank. Many local bus lines stop at the station. The bus station is 300 m (980 ft) north of the station.

== History ==
Järvenpää railway station was one of the first railway stations in Finland, established on the country's first railway line in 1862. The station building was completed already in 1858, and is thought to be designed by architect Carl Albert Edelfelt. The station was originally planned to be the junction station for a railway line to Porvoo, but in the end, the railway line was built starting from Kerava station. When local train traffic in Finland began in summer 1886, Järvenpää acted as the terminus for two local train services.

In 1999, the station building was moved approximately 25 m (82 ft) further away from the tracks. The ticket sales office was closed in 2022 and a R-kioski was opened inside the station on December 20th, 2023.

== Departure tracks ==
Järvenpää railway station has four tracks out of which tracks 1, 3 and 4 have a platform. Track 2 is used by southbound long-distance trains that skip the station meanwhile northbound long-distance trains that skip the station use track 3.

- Track 1 is used by commuter trains D, R and T to Helsinki.
- Track 4 is used by commuter trains D, R and T to Riihimäki.
