= Savio Rail Tunnel =

Railway tunnel in Finland

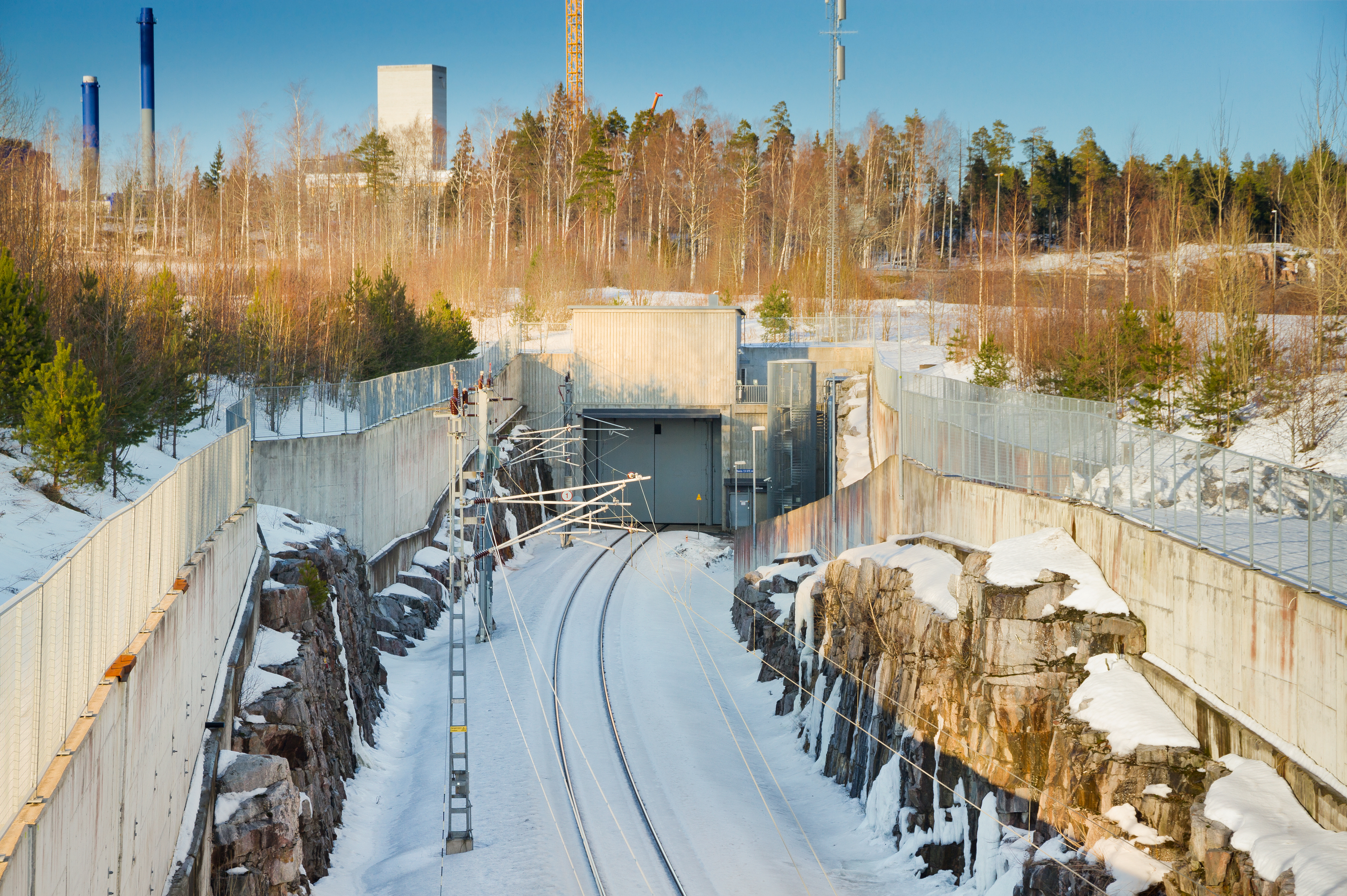
- Interactive map of Savio Rail Tunnel

Overview
- Location: Southern Finland
- Coordinates: 60°15′39″N 25°7′48″E
- Start: Savio, Kerava
- End: Länsisalmi, Vantaa

Operation
- Opened: November 28, 2008
- Operator: VR Group
- Character: Freight

Technical
- Length: 13.5 kilometres (8.4 mi)
- No. of tracks: Single
- Track gauge: 1,524 mm (5 ft)
- Electrified: 25 kV AC
- Operating speed: 80 kilometres per hour (50 mph)
- Min elevation: −20 metres (−66 ft)

The Savio Rail Tunnel connects the Vuosaari Harbour with the Helsinki–Tampere main line in Kerava. It is near the capital city of Helsinki, Finland. The tunnel is single track, electrified and 13.5 kilometres long. Construction began in 2004, and the tunnel opened in November 2008. The tunnel is part of a 19-kilometre Vuosaari harbour rail.
