= Helsinki commuter rail =

Commuter rail system in Uusimaa, Finland

Helsinki commuter rail Helsingin seudun lähijunaliikenne Huvudstadsregionens närtrafik
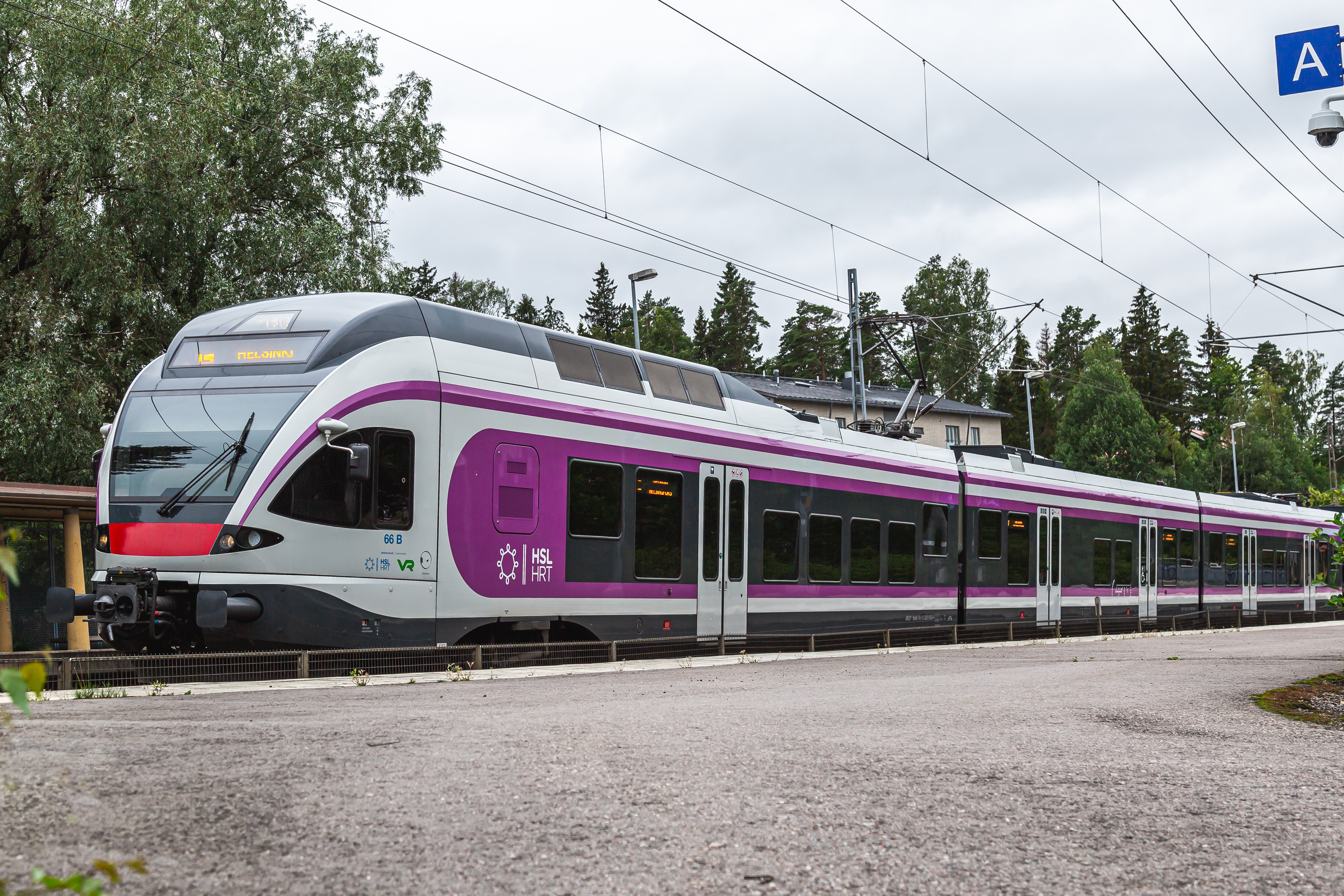
- JKOY Class Sm5 at Tuomarila railway station

Overview
- Locale: Helsinki metropolitan area, Finland
- Transit type: Commuter rail
- Number of lines: 4
- Number of stations: 46 in the HSL region 66 in total
- Daily ridership: 200,000 daily (2018)
- Annual ridership: 70 million (2018)
- Website: "VR's commuter traffic - VR". www.vr.fi.

Operation
- Began operation: 1969
- Operator: VR as contracted to HSL

Technical
- System length: 235 km (146 mi) (total length); 99.2 km (62 mi) (dedicated "city rail" tracks located entirely within the HSL zone)
- Track gauge: 1,524 mm (5 ft)
- Electrification: 25 kV 50 Hz AC
- Average speed: 54 km/h (34 mph)
- Top speed: 120 to 160 km/h (75 to 99 mph)

Helsinki commuter rail (Finnish: Helsingin seudun lähijunaliikenne, Swedish: Huvudstadsregionens närtrafik) is a commuter rail system serving the Helsinki metropolitan area. The system is managed by the Helsinki Regional Transport Authority (HSL) and operations are contracted out to VR at least until 2031.

The system operates on four railway lines and comprises 13 services, all of which terminate at Helsinki Central Station. Within the HSL region, tickets and timetables are fully integrated with other modes of public transport. Some VR commuter rail services extend into the HSL region, and HSL tickets are used instead of VR ones when travelling entirely within the HSL region. Both parties discontinued onboard ticket sales in 2017.

Commuter rail is a backbone of public transport in Helsinki and is by far the longest rapid transit system in Finland, carrying a total of around 70 million passengers in 2018 and operating around a thousand departures each weekday (2023).

== History ==
=== Late 1800s ===
The history of local trains in and around Helsinki began on 1 June 1886 with four daily back-and-forth services on the Main Line – two terminated at Malmi station (then a market town in the parish of Helsinge), one at Kerava station and one at Järvenpää station. These services only ran from June to September for their first ten years.

=== Early 1900s ===
The Coastal Line, completed in 1903, was designed and routed with local travel in mind which has since caused issues for operating long-distance trains. Local services on the line were initiated in 1904, with two daily back-and-forth services towards Kirkkonummi station and one towards Karis station. The construction of housing near stations began quickly and by 1910, the number of daily services had increased to ten.

=== 1920s to 1940s ===
During the steam locomotive era, local services were operated with wooden carriages with wide doors for embarkment, attached to locomotives such as the Class Pr1. Passenger numbers increased vastly after Finland gained independence in 1917, with 4 million trips made in 1920 and 9 million in 1924. The Great Depression decreased commuter numbers drastically – at its lowest, only 3 million trips were made per year in the 1930s. At the end of the decade, the tally was recorded at around 4 million.

As Finland was forced to lease the Porkkala Naval Base and its surrounding areas to the Soviet Union in 1944, westbound local trains from Helsinki had to terminate at Kauklahti station until the lease period came to an end in 1956.

=== 1950s to 1960s ===
After the Second World War, train tracks in Finland were generally in a very bad shape. Massive war reparations for the Soviet Union meant that the Finnish state was left with little to no resources for even regular maintenance of the country's railway lines. Thus, the Main Line and the beginning section of the Coastal Line had to keep accommodating long-distance and freight trains alongside a growing need for new local services and new diesel trains such as the Class Dm7.

The age of the modern Finnish commuter train began in 1969 as the first stretch of the Coastal Line up to Kirkkonummi station was electrified. With electrification came a significant drop in journey times – while the Class Dm7 railbus took an hour to reach Kirkkonummi after stopping at all stations, the electric Class Sm1 did the same in 45 minutes.

=== 1970s to 1980s ===
The 1970s marked many firsts for urban rail transport in southern Finland. Early in the decade, the term commuter train (Finnish: lähijuna) was first adopted into official use. Letters of the alphabet were introduced as service identifiers in 1972, as inspired by the Copenhagen S-train network. The initial letters A, H, K, L, N, P, R, S and T were chosen deliberately to function as mnemonic devices and to minimize the risk of ambiguity between each other. Somewhat confusingly, certain letters were also taken to use as identifiers for travel zones in the commuter train system.

Work began on the first purpose-built commuter rail lines in the country. The Martinlaakso Line, opened four years later, was the first rail branch in Finland meant exclusively for commuter trains and has been a backbone for urbanization of the city of Vantaa. The Kerava Urban Line was initially an additional third track for commuter services running on the newly electrified Main Line, first being built up to Hiekkaharju station in 1972 and reaching Kerava station in 1981.

=== 1990s ===
With the 1990s, the first common transport ticket system came to use in the Helsinki metropolitan area. YTV – the capital region commission for transport and environment, a partial precursor of HSL – took over ticket sales and inspections in the four capital region municipalities, former VR zones A and B.

In 1991, the Martinlaakso Line became the Vantaankoski Line after being extended one station further to Vantaankoski station. The Coastal Line was electrified up to Karis station in 1993 and another track of the Kerava Urban Line reached Tikkurila station in 1996.

=== 2000s ===
A new urban section running parallel to the Coastal Line, the Leppävaara Urban Line, was instated in 2001 with two new tracks for commuter services only.

The Lahti Line, opened in 2006, splits from the Main Line after Kerava station. The hourly commuter service running on it is known as the Z train.

=== 2010s ===
The Ring Rail Line opened in 2015, connecting the Vantaankoski Line to the Main Line via Helsinki Airport and four other newly opened stations. Unlike other Helsinki commuter rail lines, part of the Ring Rail Line runs in a tunnel with the Airport station and Aviapolis station being located underground. It is possible to construct a branch to Klaukkala in the future.

In the late 2010s, operations of the commuter trains were opened for competition for the first time ever. HSL prequalified seven companies for tendering in 2018 and two years later, chose to award the contract to VR until 2031, citing higher than expected cost savings in VR's proposal.

=== 2020s ===
In June 2021, VR commenced a ten-year contract to operate the network.

== Future extensions ==
The network within the Helsinki capital region. Thick brown lines represent lines with dedicated commuter rail tracks located entirely within the HSL zone. The Helsinki commuter rail itself extends beyond the boundaries of this map.

=== Espoo City Railway ===
The Leppävaara Urban Line – two tracks reserved exclusively for commuter trains, running parallel to the Coastal Line – is about to be extended by 14 km to Espoo station, thus becoming the Espoo City Railway. Work on the extension began in late 2023 and is expected to be completed in 2028. The project is overseen by the Finnish Transport Infrastructure Agency, and will allow for higher frequencies for westbound commuter rail services as well as provide increased capacity required for the Helsinki–Turku high-speed railway project.

=== New depots ===
Since the late-2010s, two new depots for Helsinki commuter rail rolling stock have been planned to be located in Kirkkonummi and Kerava, to relieve potential overcrowding at Ilmala depot.

=== Other proposals ===
Projects such as the City Rail Loop, the Vantaankoski Line branch to Klaukkala and the Kerava Urban Line branch to Nikkilä have been put on hold indefinitely.

== Services ==
All services begin and terminate at Helsinki Central, thus, only the final destination of each service is mentioned next to the service identifier. All services also call at Pasila station in both directions.

=== Coastal Line ===
A Stopping all stations to Leppävaara

The A train is the most frequent westbound service on the system, also being the shortest service on the entire Helsinki commuter rail. It has been operated in its current form since 2002, as made possible by the construction of the Leppävaara Urban Line which runs parallel to the Coastal Line. The A calls at all stations on its route.

For a short period of time in the 1970s, the letter A was designated to a stopping train to Kirkkonummi station.

E Semi-Fast train to Kauklahti

The E train has been in operation since 1974, originally as a stopping train terminating at Espoo station. In 2007, the service was extended one stop further to Kauklahti station.

L Stopping all stations to Kirkkonummi

The L train is one of only three services which have remained unchanged since the alphabetical services were introduced in 1972. It operates exclusively in the fringe hours and is the only Coastal Line service to run hourly through the night on weekends.

U Semi-Fast train to Kirkkonummi

The U train was instated in 1988 as a rush hour express service, becoming an all-day service in 2002 after the Leppävaara Urban Line was completed and capacity grew. In 2016, remaining services of the S train were merged into the U which then became a trunk service with 30 minute intervals.

Y Fast local train to Siuntio

The Y train is the fastest westbound service on the system, calling only at eight stations out of the 18 on its route. The Y train was originally introduced in 1974 as a limited-stop train to Kirkkonummi. This service was discontinued in 1987, being replaced by the S and U trains. The Y train was reintroduced in 2002 as an express train to Karis, stopping only at six stations. In March 2016, the terminus of the Y train was moved from Karis to Siuntio station and the train received two additional stops at Huopalahti and Espoo. In 2019, the train started also to stop at Kauklahti.

H Stopping train between Karis and Hanko / on certain departures an express train between Karis and Helsinki Central

The H train runs primarily between Karis and Hanko. On Wednesday, Friday and Sunday, one H train service is operated from Helsinki to Hanko and vice versa, stopping only at six stations between Helsinki and Karis.

=== Ring Rail Line ===
I Anticlockwise stopping train to Helsinki Airport and back to Helsinki Central

P Clockwise stopping train to Helsinki Airport and back to Helsinki Central

The I & P trains are commuter services running in opposite directions and calling at all stations. These services were instated in their current forms in 2015, after the completion of the Ring Rail Line, and have run on 10 to 20 minute intervals throughout the day ever since. The I and the P also cover the initial stretch of the Main Line and the entire Vantaankoski Line.

=== Main Line ===
D Express train to Hämeenlinna

The D train is a single return service operated on weekdays. It departs towards Helsinki in the morning and returns to Hämeenlinna station in the afternoon, calling at only eight stations on its route. The service was introduced in 2016, originally terminating at Riihimäki, replacing the former letterless extra services operated during peak hours on weekdays. The service was expanded to Hämeenlinna in 2020.

For a while in 2016 and 2017, the D was the only northbound commuter service to skip Tikkurila station.

K Stopping train to Kerava

The K train has terminated at Kerava station ever since its introduction in 1972 but has gradually shifted from an express service to a stopping train, now calling at all stations. Historically, the K had a counterpart stopping at all stations known as the N train. Before finally being merged to the K in 2019, the N was limited to fringe hours and weekend nights.

R Limited-stop train to Riihimäki / on certain departures to Tampere C

The R train is the Main Line's main commuter service. It has two termini – Riihimäki station every half an hour and Tampere Central every two hours. Before Kerava station, the R only calls at major interchanges Pasila and Tikkurila, calling at every station thereafter.

Often heavily crowded during peak hours, especially in the HSL region, most R departures are operated with up to four Class Sm4 units.

T Stopping train to Riihimäki

The T train is an hourly night time service, calling at all stations on the way to Riihimäki. It is the only regular train service in Finland to operate throughout the night on weekdays.

=== Lahti Line ===
Z Limited-stop train to Lahti / on certain departures to Kouvola

The Z train is an hourly service on the Lahti Line, inaugurated in 2006 after the new line was completed. Previously, the most straightforward way to Lahti went via Riihimäki station. Certain fringe hour departures are operated all the way to Kouvola station whilst calling at all stations in between. The extended Z route from Helsinki to Kouvola is the longest haul on the entire VR commuter rail network.

The Z was the first Finnish commuter service to regularly require rolling stock capable of running at a speed of 160 km/h.

== Schematic map of services ==
Note that commuter services G, M and O are not part of the Helsinki commuter rail network.

**HSL** region
**VR** region
**VR/Nysse** region
**VR/Kymenlaakso** region
= Helsinki commuter rail
= VR commuter rail
Y
**Siuntio**	U	L
**Kirkkonummi**
Tolsa
Jorvas	Martinlaakso
Masala	E	Louhela
**Kauklahti**	Myyrmäki
Espoo	Malminkartano
Tuomarila	Kannelmäki
Koivuhovi	Pohjois-Haaga
Kauniainen
Kera
Kilo	A
**Leppävaara**
Mäkkylä
Pitäjänmäki
Valimo
Huopalahti
Ilmala
**Pasila**
**Helsinki C**
Y	U	L	E	A	P	I
= train stops at station = train stops at station in the marked direction only = train passes station without stopping = train bypasses station **Bold** = Terminus / interchange with other modes of public transport

M	R
**Nokia**
Tesoma
**Tampere C**
Lempäälä	G	Z	O
Viiala	**Lahti**
**Toijala**	Herrala	Villähde
M	Iittala	Järvelä	Nastola
D	Parola	Lappila	Henna	Uusikylä
**Hämeenlinna**	Mommila	Kausala
Turenki	Oitti	Koria
T	Ryttylä	Hikiä	Mäntsälä	**Kouvola**
**Riihimäki**	Myllykoski
Hyvinkää	G	Inkeroinen
Jokela	Haarajoki	Tavastila
Saunakallio	Kymi
Vantaankoski	Järvenpää	Kyminlinna
Vehkala	K	Ainola	Paimenportti
Kivistö	Kerava	Kotka
Aviapolis	Savio	**Kotka Port**
**Airport**	Korso	O
Leinelä	Rekola
Koivukylä
Hiekkaharju
**Tikkurila**
Puistola
Tapanila
Malmi
Pukinmäki
Oulunkylä
Käpylä
**Pasila**
**Helsinki C**
I	P	K	T	D	R	Z

== Former services ==
Some discontinued letters have since been redesignated to new services on different lines and routes. For the purposes of distinction and clarity, symbols of former Helsinki commuter rail services are colored grey on Wikipedia, regardless of their actual color on former maps.

G Express train to Saunakallio

The former G train ran from Helsinki to Saunakallio. The line had six services a day in both directions and it was the only train with letter designation on the Helsinki–Riihimäki route that did not stop at Tikkurila. The service was started on 4 June 2007. It was abolished in 2011 in order to improve management of traffic and timetable keeping on the Main Line especially during winter conditions. The letter G was reintroduced in 2017 on the previously unlettered line between Riihimäki and Lahti.

H Limited-stop train to Riihimäki

The former H train ran from Helsinki to Riihimäki and operated with an interval of one hour. After stopping in Pasila, Tikkurila and Kerava, the line proceeded to stop at all stations. The letter H is an original designation from 1972. Several stops (listed above in parentheses) were procedurally closed in 1990–98 due to low passenger numbers and the H trains disturbing other traffic by being too slow. In March 2016, the Purola and Nuppulinna stations were closed and the H trains were replaced with the R train that now has two additional stops and double the frequency.

M Stopping train to Vantaankoski

The former M train ran from Helsinki to Vantaankoski. The train operated with 10–30 minutes intervals, stopping at all stations. The service ran continuously between 1975, when the track to Martinlaakso was completed, and 2015, when the Vantaankoski Line was continued by the Ring Rail Line. In 1991, the line was continued one stop further to Vantaankoski. The letter M stood for Martinlaakso, though the M train was substituted in 2015 with the P train, to avoid confusion with the Helsinki Metro. The letter M is now (since 2019) used for Tampere commuter rail service entirely operating in the Tampere metropolitan area in Pirkanmaa.

N Stopping train to Kerava

The N train ran from Helsinki to Kerava, stopping at all stations. On its final years in operation, the train operated only on early morning and on evening during weekdays, with 30 minute intervals. On weekends the train operated more frequently with 10 minute intervals on Saturday and 15 minute intervals on Sunday. The N train was abolished in August 2019 and was replaced by K train, which started to stop at all stations.

P Stopping train to Hiekkaharju

The former P train ran from Helsinki to Hiekkaharju, stopping at all stations. The service was started in 1972 and stopped in August 2004. The letter P was reintroduced in 2015 as a clockwise Ring Rail train.

S Limited-stop train to Kirkkonummi

The S train ran from Helsinki to Kirkkonummi. The train was operated with one hour intervals in both directions. Of the two daytime trains running between Helsinki and Kirkkonummi, the S trains were faster. From 28 May 1972 to 25 May 1974, the S trains were running between Helsinki and Kauniainen. The route was continued to Kirkkonummi on 27 September 1987. The S train was abolished in March 2016 when two small stops located between Kauklahti and Masala and served only by the U-line were closed and the U line now runs twice an hour.

X Limited stop train to Siuntio

The X train ran originally from Helsinki to Kirkkonummi and was the fastest commuter train service on Helsinki-Kirkkonummi line along with the Y train. The X train had only one service in both directions on weekdays. The X train was introduced in March 2016 and abolished in June 2018. The X train was reinstated in 2020 as the identifier for limited-stop trains to Siuntio station, formerly operated as exceptional services of the U train. The X train was once again abolished in April 2, 2024 and its services were turned into Y trains.

Before being instated on the Coastal Line in 2016, the letter X had been used unofficially by railway staff to designate a letter-lacking service to Riihimäki station on the Main Line.

== Rolling stock ==
Since 2017, all services within the HSL region have been operated with a fleet of 81 Stadler Flirts manufactured between 2008 and 2017, designated as Class Sm5. The previously used Class Sm2 and Class Sm4 trainsets have since served on VR-operated longer-distance commuter routes.

In a unique structure of ownership and management, the Class Sm5 trains are owned by neither HSL as the authority or VR as the operator. Instead, to make the purchase of new modern trainsets possible, a holding company called Pääkaupunkiseudun junakalusto was established by the four cities forming the Helsinki capital region. Under direct ownership of said cities, JKOY is a fully independent rolling stock corporation capable of leasing trainsets to any train operator when necessary.

Formerly, commuter rail has been operated with locomotive-hauled wooden-bodied cars as their last commercial use before being retired in the late 1980s. After that, Class Eil cars replaced them, remaining in use themselves until the late 2010s.

History of Helsinki commuter rail rolling stock
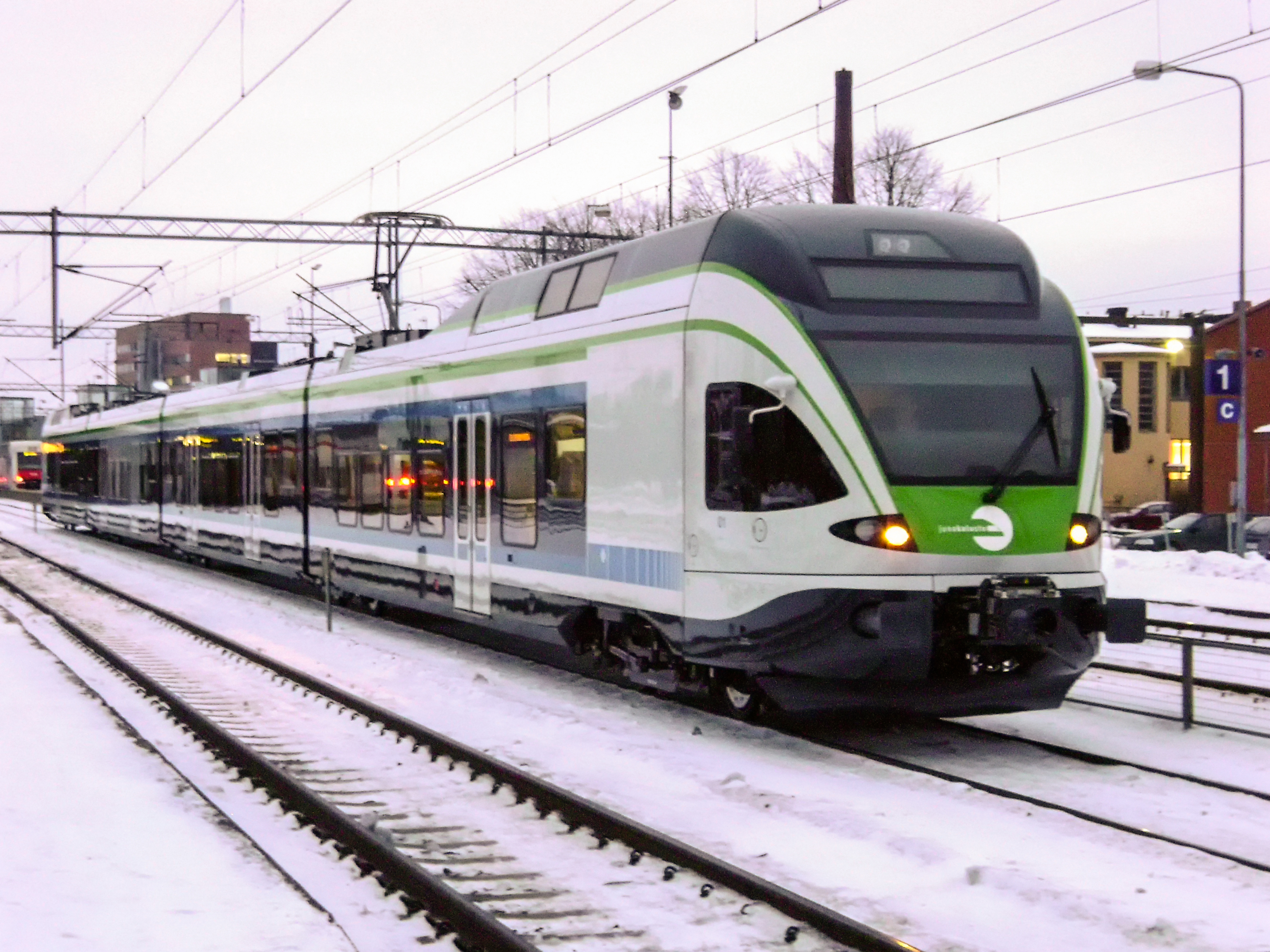
Sm5 EMU at Riihimäki on a test run in February 2009 prior to entering commercial service.

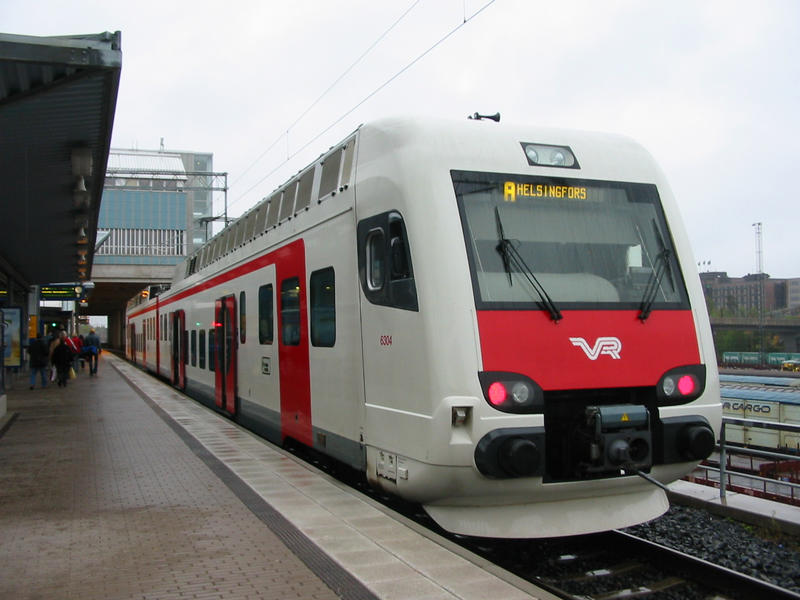
Sm4 EMU at Pasila

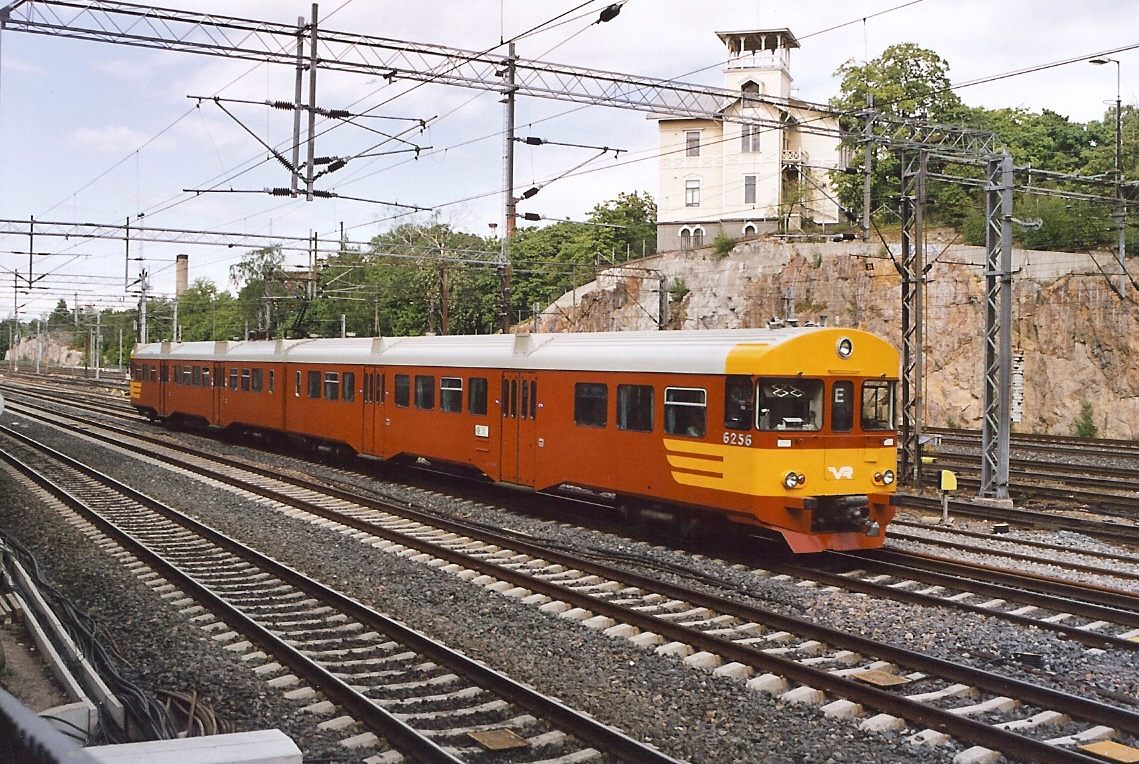
Sm2 EMU from the 1970s between Pasila and Helsinki in old colors (June 2001)

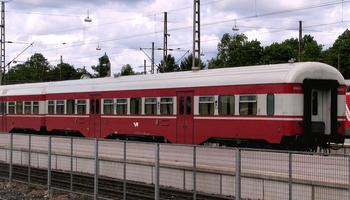
Eil class commuter cars at Helsinki Central railway station

== See also ==
- Helsinki Metro
- Jokeri light rail
- VR commuter rail
