= Lahti–Heinola railway =

Railway line in Finland

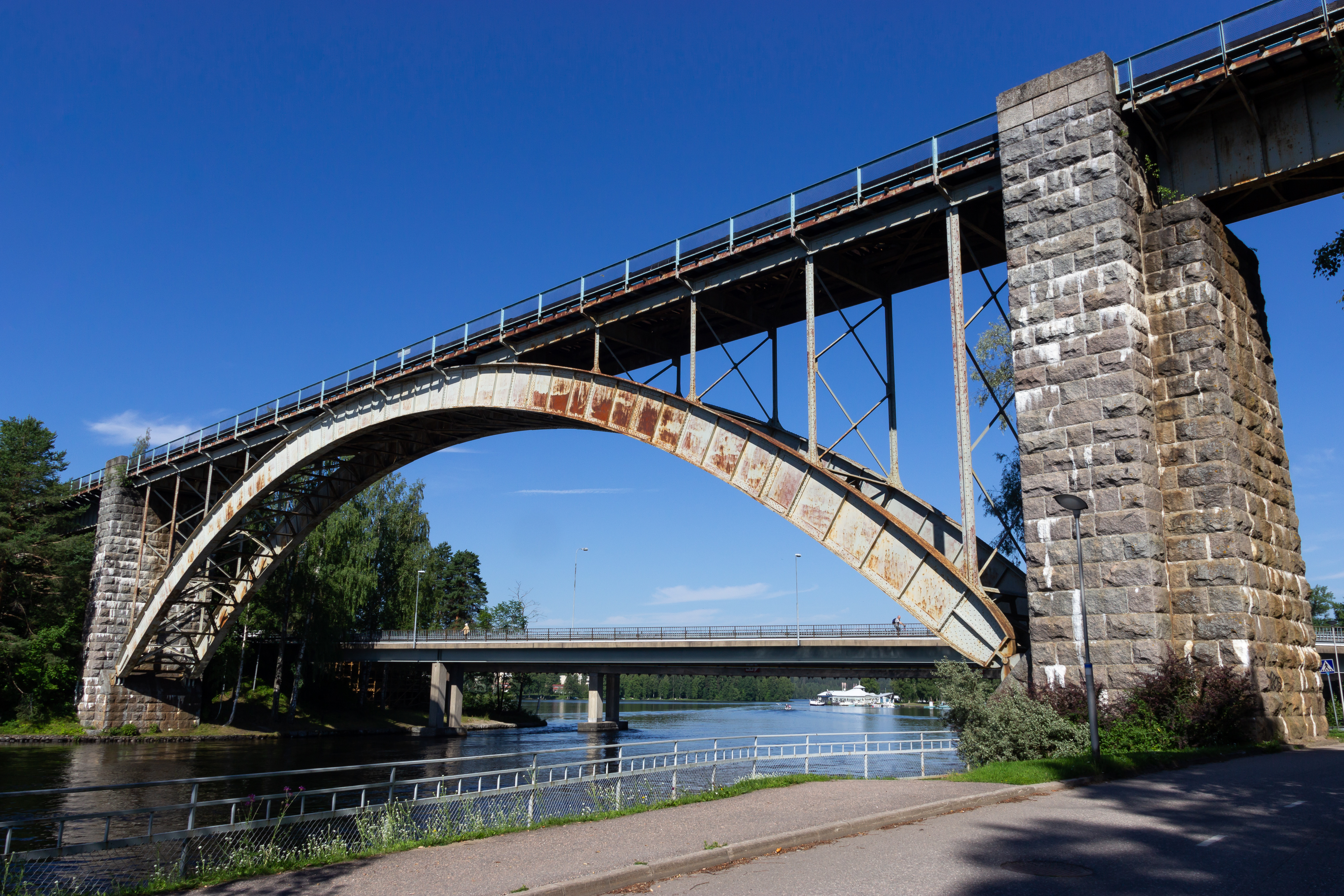
- The railway bridge crossing river Jyrängönvirta in Heinola

Overview
- Status: Open
- Owner: Finnish government
- Locale: Päijät-Häme
- Termini: Lahti; Heinola

Service
- Operator(s): VR Group

History
- Opened: 1 January 1932
- Passenger services ceased: 26 May 1968

Technical
- Line length: 37.4 km (23.2 mi)
- Number of tracks: 1
- Track gauge: 1,524 mm (5 ft)
- Electrification: None
- Operating speed: 50–60 km/h (31–37 mph)

The Lahti–Heinola railway (Finnish: Lahti–Heinola-rata, Swedish: Lahtis–Heinola-banan), also called the Heinola railway (Finnish: Heinolan rata, Swedish: Heinolabanan) is a 1,524 mm (5 ft) railway in Finland, connecting the towns and stations of Lahti and Heinola in the region of Päijät-Häme.

== History ==
The prospect of building a railway reaching from Lahti to Mikkeli via Heinola was brought up for the first time after the completion of the Riihimäki–Saint Petersburg railway in the planning process of the Savonia railway. Even though the line ended up being built beginning from Kouvola instead, the idea of connecting Heinola to the fledgling railway network was brought up by the town's representatives in the Finnish Diet's sessions through the 1880s to the early 1900s, with little success. In part due to efforts from two former members of parliament, Mikeal Soininen and Oskari Orasmaa, both hailing from Heinola, the final decision to build the railway was finally made by the Finnish parliament on 4 November 1909. However, the beginning of the construction itself ended up being heavily delayed, in part due to the beginning of the Finnish Civil War.

As the newly independent Finland stabilized and its economic conditions improved, lobbying in favor of the Heinola line was reinitiated; in 1924, representatives from the town and several nearby municipalities of Mikkeli, Juva, Savonlinna, Kerimäki and Sulkava founded a committee that raised the matter of constructing a west-to-east line from Lahti to Matkaselkä, some 30 kilometres (19 mi) north of Sortavala, via Heinola, Mikkeli and Savonlinna. The committee, backed by the services of engineer Artur Grönmark – responsible for a study regarding the route and economic impact of the prospective line – delivered an appeal to the government in the same year.

The project budget was approved in 1926 and construction work began on 10 September 1928. A significant part of the work on a 21 kilometres (13 mi) stretch was done by a workforce of prisoners: 275 prisoners were situated in Ahtiala, 120 in Mäkelä, and 140 in Vierumäki. Each prisoner was entitled to a daily compensation of 30 markka, and were accommodated with health, hygiene, religious and educational services.

It was originally planned to place the Heinola station on the west bank of the Jyrängönvirta, on the territory of the rural municipality of Heinola. In 1928, however, the Finnish government officialized a plan to extend the line further over the river, to have it reach the town limits. Even after the construction of the railway had been initiated in 1928, the exact placement of the bridge was subject to dispute; it took two more years for the construction of the bridge to begin.

The line was opened for provisional traffic on 1 October 1931; during this time, the station of Ränninmäki, later renamed Jyränkö, acted as the terminus of the line until the completion of the Jyrängönvirta bridge. A formal inauguration ceremony was held on 10 September 1932, which featured a jubilee train carrying president Pehr Evind Svinhufvud and his spouse Ellen from Helsinki to Heinola. The celebration held a sentimental value to president Svinhufvud, thanks to his earlier tenure as a judge in the judicial district of Heinola in 1906–1908.

== Overview ==
The Lahti–Heinola railway stretches approximately 37.4 kilometres (23.2 mi) long, consists of one track for its entire length, has a top speed limit of 50–60 km/h (31–37 mph), and is unelectrified. While the line has had several stations in the past, in the present the stations of Lahti and Heinola are the only ones where cargo loading and unloading activities occur: the operating points of the Vierumäki and Myllyoja stations are still active, though they are only used for the purposes of track maintenance. The only regular user of the line in the present is the Stora Enso paperboard factory in Heinola.
