= Haarajoki =

District in Järvenpää, Finland

Coordinates: 60.4968°N 25.1288°E

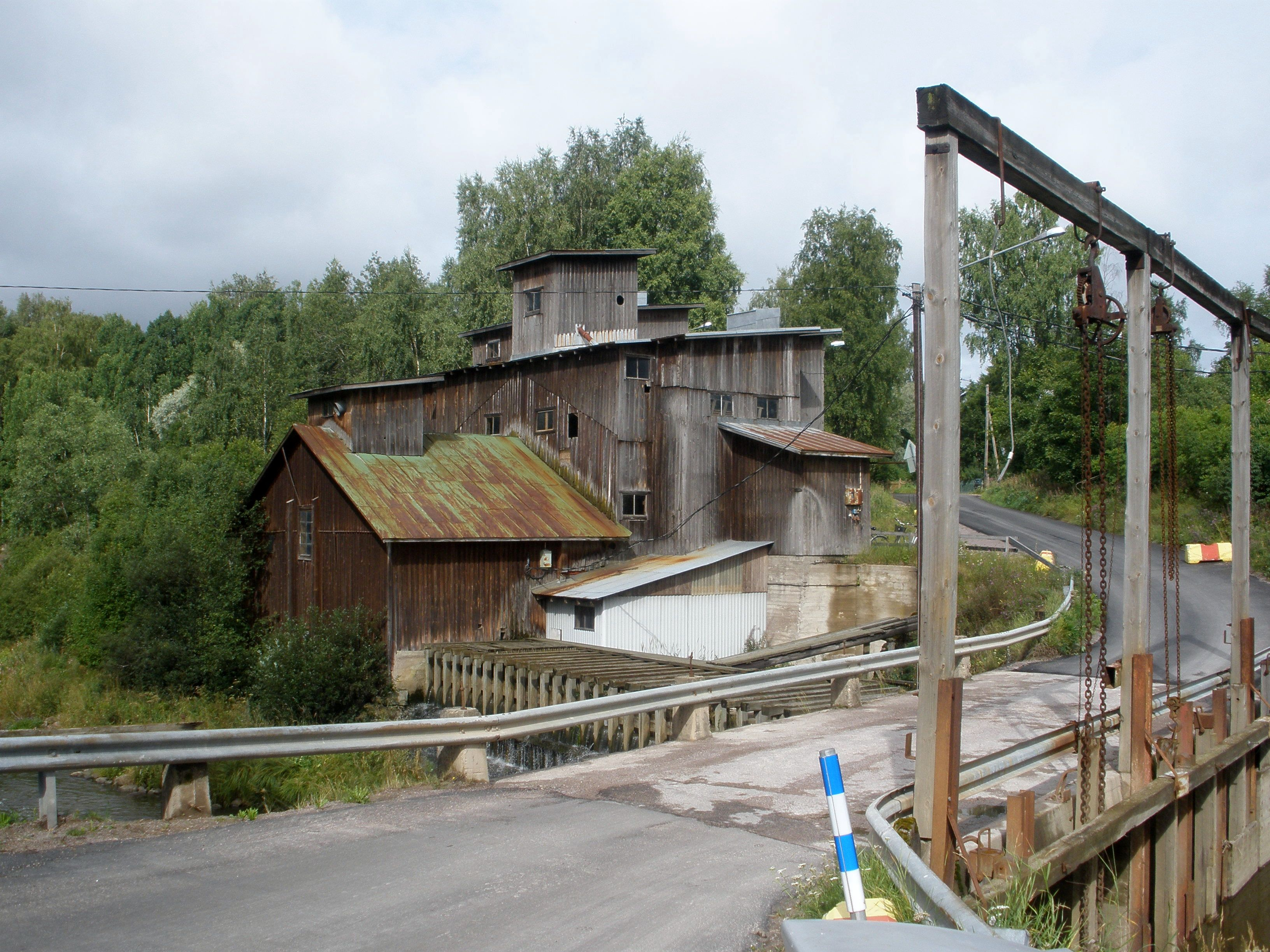
Haarajoki

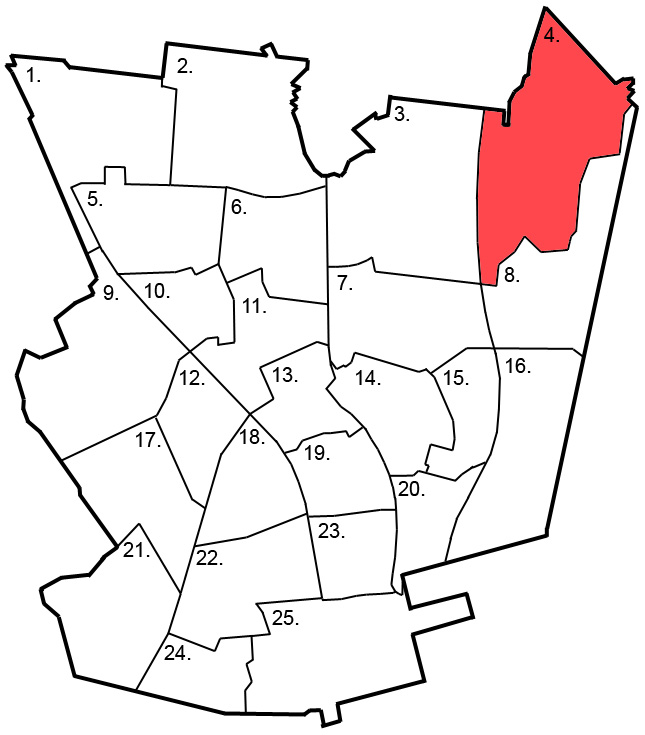

Haarajoki is a district in northern Järvenpää, Finland. In 2014, Haarajoki had a population of 1,539. Haarajoki railway station is located in Haarajoki.
