= Thure Hellström =

Finnish architect (1880–1946)

Thure Adolf Hellström (30 May 1880 – 23 December 1946) was a Finnish architect working on railroad stations for Rautatiehallitus (The Railroad Board) with Bruno Granholm.

Hellström was born in Koivisto. He designed wooden railway station buildings at Kemi - Rovaniemi, Joensuu-Nurmes, Seinäjoki-Kaskinen, Perälä-Kristinestad, Pieksämäki-Savonlinna and Sciences-Pieksämäki. His early style was Art Nouveau, but he also designed Neoclassical station buildings.

Later, he designed more substantial buildings in stone such as Hämeenlinna, Ore, Kuopio, Pori, Riihimäki railway stations, and in 1935 in brick, Gulf station. He died in Helsinki.

== Stations designed by Hellström ==
Some of Hellström's original buildings have since been demolished, but others remain in active use.

- Hämeenlinna railway station (finished in 1921)
- Kuopio railway station
- Malmi railway station
- Pori railway station
- Riihimäki railway station
- Lahti railway station (finished in 1935)
- Tampere railway station (finished in 1936)

== Source ==
- Husbyggnaderna vid statens järnvägar. Finska statsjärnvägarne 1862–1912 11, Thure Hellström, Helsingfors, 1915, 314. (in Swedish)
