= Lahti railway station =

Railway station in Lahti, Finland

Lahti Lahtis
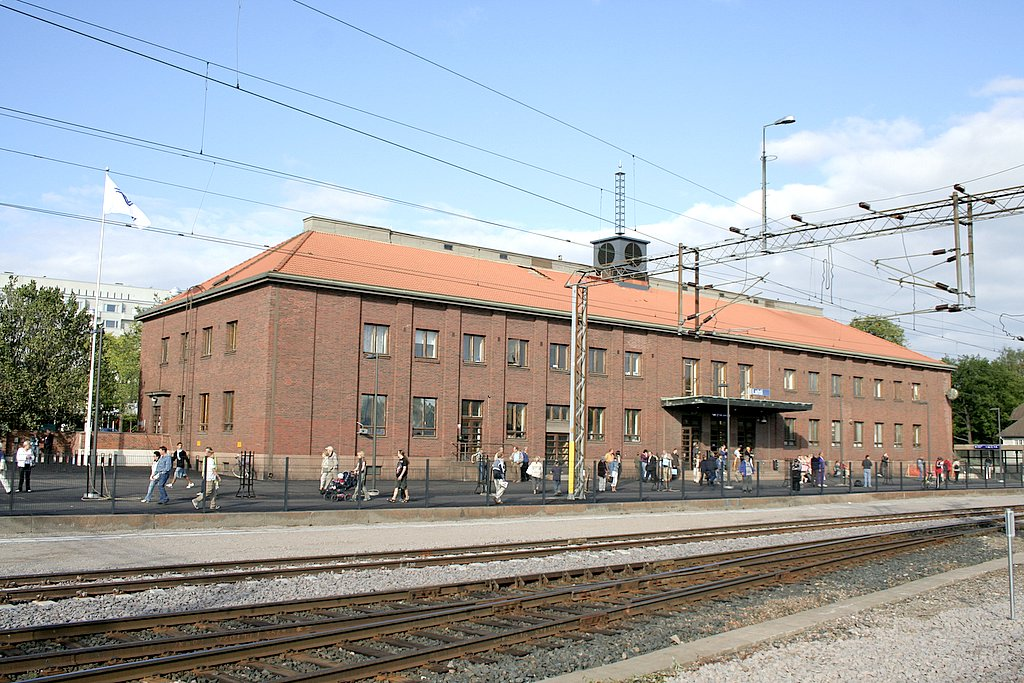
- Lahti railway station.

General information
- Location: Mannerheiminkatu 15, 15100; Keski-Lahti, Lahti; Finland
- Coordinates: 60°58′37″N 25°39′27″E
- System: VR station
- Owner: Finnish Transport Agency
- Lines: Riihimäki–Kouvola; Kerava–Lahti; Lahti–Loviisa; Lahti–Heinola
- Platforms: 3
- Tracks: 7

Construction
- Structure type: Ground station

Other information
- Station code: Lh

Passengers
- 2014: 880,000

Services
| Preceding station | VR commuter rail | Following station |
|---|---|---|
| Herrala towards Riihimäki | G | Terminus |
| Mäntsälä towards Helsinki | Z | Terminus |
| Terminus | O | Villähde towards Kotkan satama |
| Preceding station | VR Group | Following station |
| through to Tikkurila | Kerava–Lahti | through to Kouvola |
Location

The Lahti railway station (Finnish: Lahden rautatieasema, Swedish: Lahtis järnvägsstation) is located in the city of Lahti in Finland.

== History ==
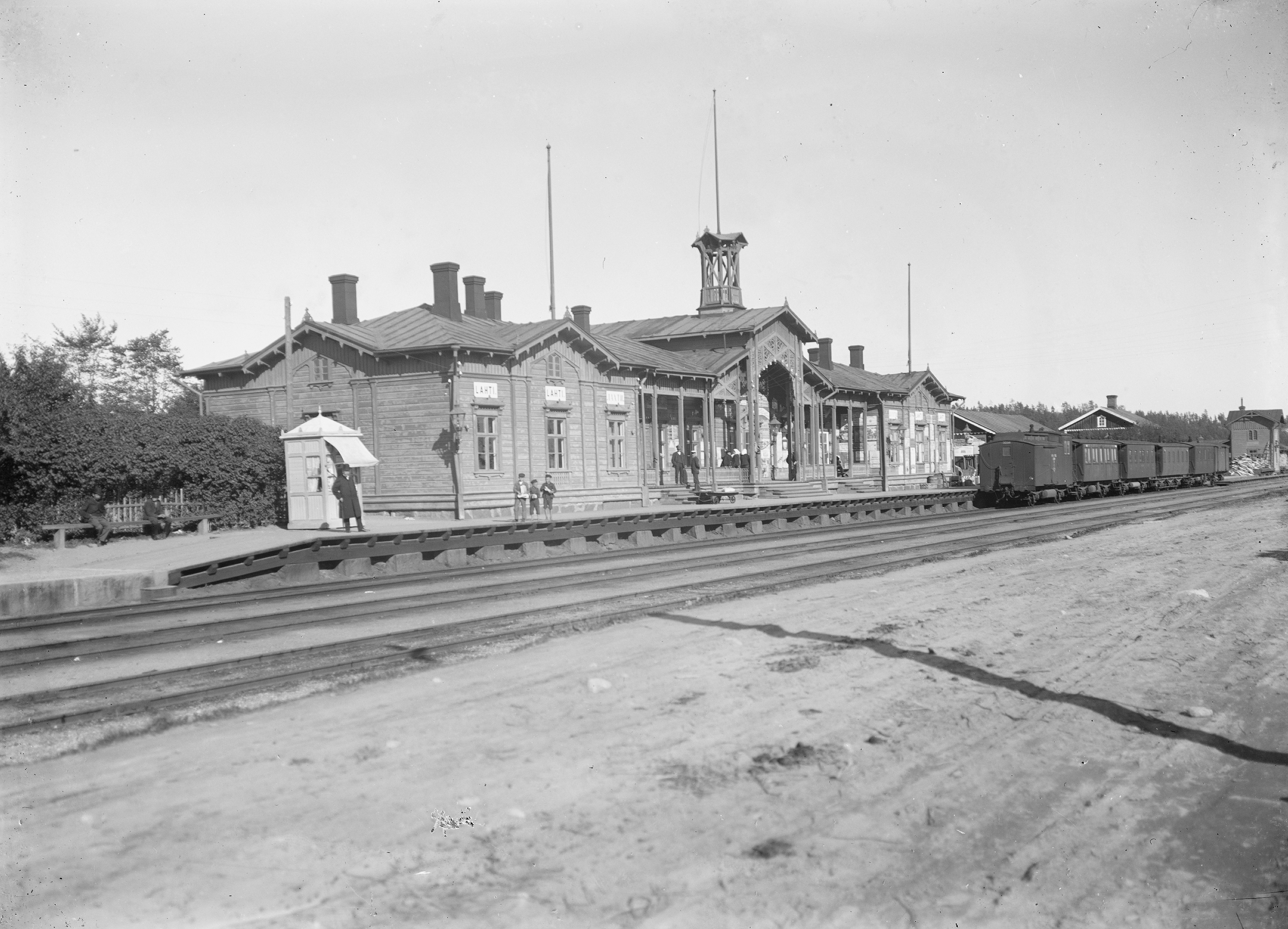
The second station building in Lahti in 1908

During the planning stages of the Saint Petersburg railway, two track alignment options were weighed with regard to connecting the fledgling Finnish railways with the important waterborne route on lake Päijänne: one passing through Anianpelto in Asikkala on the narrow isthmus between lake Vesijärvi and the Päijänne, and another grazing the Vesijärvi on its southern shore, in the village of Lahti in Hollola. The plan to build the line via Lahti was officialized in 1864, largely due to pragmatic reasons: the line turned out approximately 50 kilometres (31 mi) shorter than the Anianpelto option, amounting to about two hours saved per trip between Helsinki and St. Petersburg.

The diet of Finland in its 1867 session accepted the Senate's proposal to initiate work on the St. Petersburg railway in the following year. The fast schedule was intended to combat the economic fallout of the famine of 1866–1868, and the project indeed attracted numerous workers from all over Finland, a number of which settled in Lahti. The impoverished and malnourished workforce was ravaged by a typhoid epidemic, which inevitably made its way to the local population as well; out of the total population of about 7,000 of the parish of Hollola, 1,010 died in 1868, along with approximately 600 workers from elsewhere. As the only cemetery of the parish could not cope with the amount of the dead, a new one dedicated to the deceased builders was founded in the nearby village of Järvenpää, which also housed a temporary hospital.

The Riihimäki–Saint Petersburg railway reached Lahti in August 1869, and the first train arrived there just three months later, on 1 November. Around the same time, a siding to the shore of the Vesijärvi was built and the Vesijärvi railway station established, marking the beginning of the development of Lahti's status as a crossing between the railway and the waterborne traffic on the Päijänne.

The first station building in Lahti, built according to stock plans from Knut Nylander for class III stations, was completed in 1869; however, it was destroyed in a fire soon after its opening. A new station was designed in 1873, again by Nylander, and its construction was completed in 1874. It bore a resemblance to the original Vyborg railway station building, presumed to have been designed by either Nylander himself or Wolmar Westling.

== Architecture ==
Shortly after the railway to Heinola was completed, the second station building was deemed to have grown insufficient to meet the needs of the city and the traffic passing through it. The third and final station building was built in 1935. The station was designed by architect Thure Hellström from the Finnish State Railways and built in 1935. Because of the depression in the 1930s, the station did not get a third floor, neither did it get a tower, as the Tampere railway station did. The plan of the station is rectangular and it has two floors. It is built of dark brown brick, just as the warehouses in the vicinity of the main building. In the 1950s, the room between the station house and the rail yard was filled by a garden, featuring a fountain.

In 2006, the station was renovated. The ticket office was moved from the east side of the corridor to the west side, and the storage lockers and R-kioski were removed from there, so that the ticket office is on the right-hand side when entering the station. The station restaurant is still in its original place on the east side of the station. The station platforms and the underpass tunnel of the west side of Vesijärvenkatu were also renovated. The renovation intended to make the station more efficient, when the more direct track from Helsinki to Lahti was opened on 1 September 2006.

Near the Lahti railway station is the stationmaster's quarters, which is considered to be a culturally significant building in the Päijät-Häme region around Lahti. It was built in 1912 and was designed by architect Albert Leidenius.

== Services ==
=== Commuter trains ===
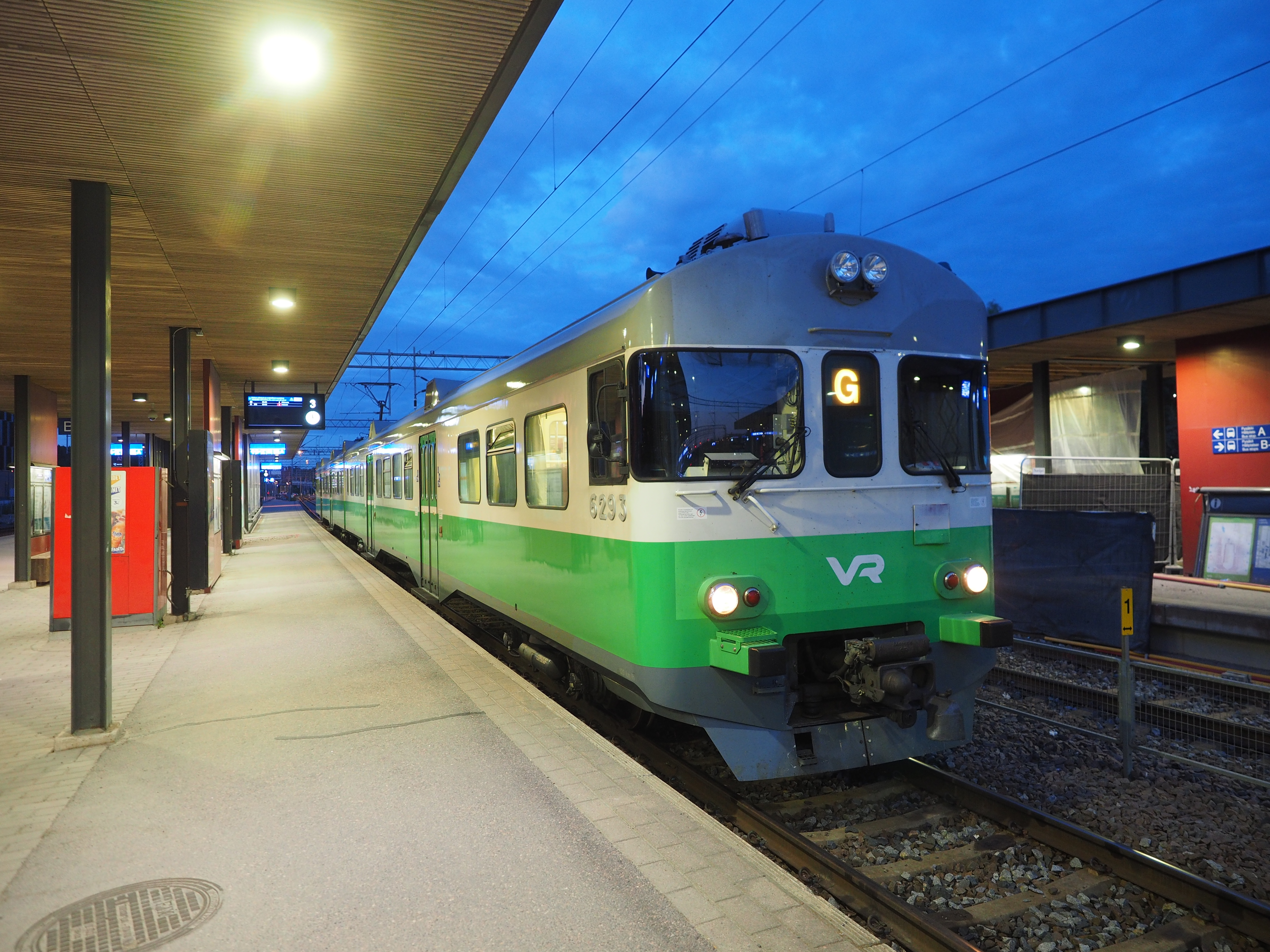
A commuter train on line G at Lahti railway station in the middle of the night.

Lahti is a terminus for two lines on the Helsinki commuter rail network: Z to Helsinki and G to Riihimäki. It is also one end of the unnamed commuter rail line to Kouvola, which merges with line Z at points: on weekdays, two commuter trains leave Kouvola in the early morning and proceed to Helsinki via Lahti. This service is also operated in the direction Helsinki–Kouvola once at late at night on weekdays, as well as in the direction Kouvola–Helsinki on weekend middays. Additionally, several of the Lahti–Kouvola commuter services are operated all the way from or continue towards Kotka as well.

=== Long-distance trains ===
As one of the termini of the Kerava–Lahti railway, all eastbound long-distance services from and to Helsinki stop at Lahti. After making a stop in Kouvola, these services then diverge to either the Kouvola–Iisalmi line towards Kuopio, or on the Kouvola–Joensuu line towards Imatra or Joensuu.

There is also a direct connection to Loviisa on the south coast, with the route's other terminus being in the Port of Loviisa.

=== International trains ===
Lahti was served by both of the services operated between Finland and Russia: night train Tolstoy between Helsinki and Moscow, and high-speed train Allegro between Helsinki and St. Petersburg. Both services were suspended during the COVID-19 pandemic and withdrawn completely following the 2022 Russian invasion of Ukraine.

== Departure tracks ==
Lahti railway station has four platform tracks.

- Track 1 is used by eastbound long-distance trains as well as some of the commuter train service to Kouvola and some individual commuter train services to Helsinki and Riihimäki.
- Track 2 is used by some of the Z trains to Helsinki as well as by some of the O trains to Kouvola/Kotka Port.
- Track 3 is used by some of the G trains to Riihimäki some of the Z trains to Helsinki.
- Track 4 is used by westbound long-distance trains as well as a few Z trains to Helsinki and some G trains to Riihimäki.

== Gallery ==
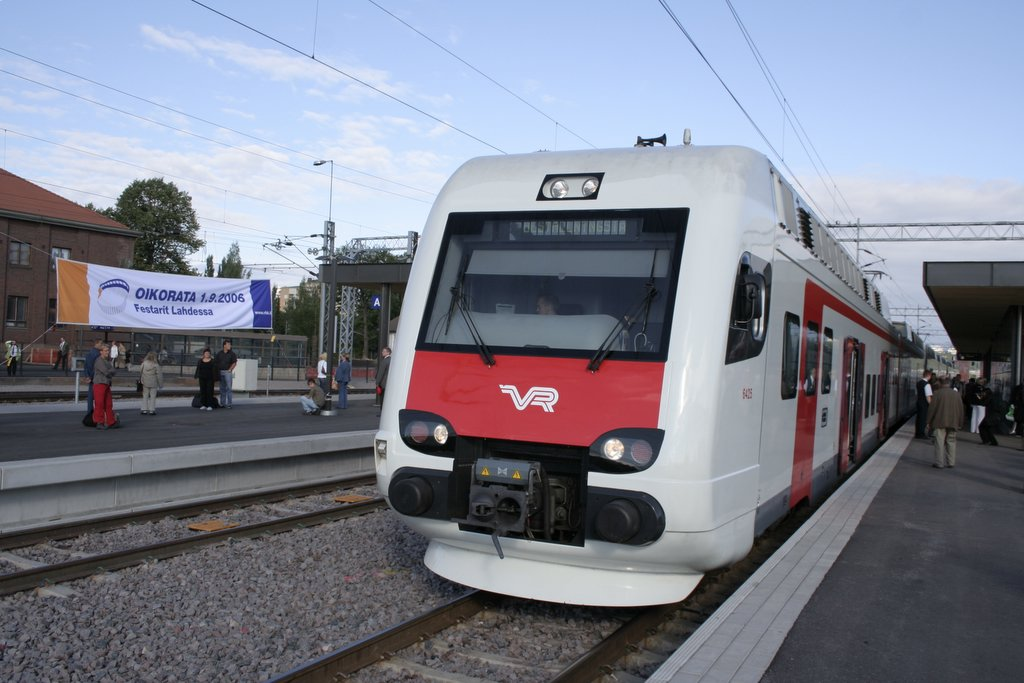
The first festival train to Mäntsälä right before leaving Lahti, on 1 September 2006.

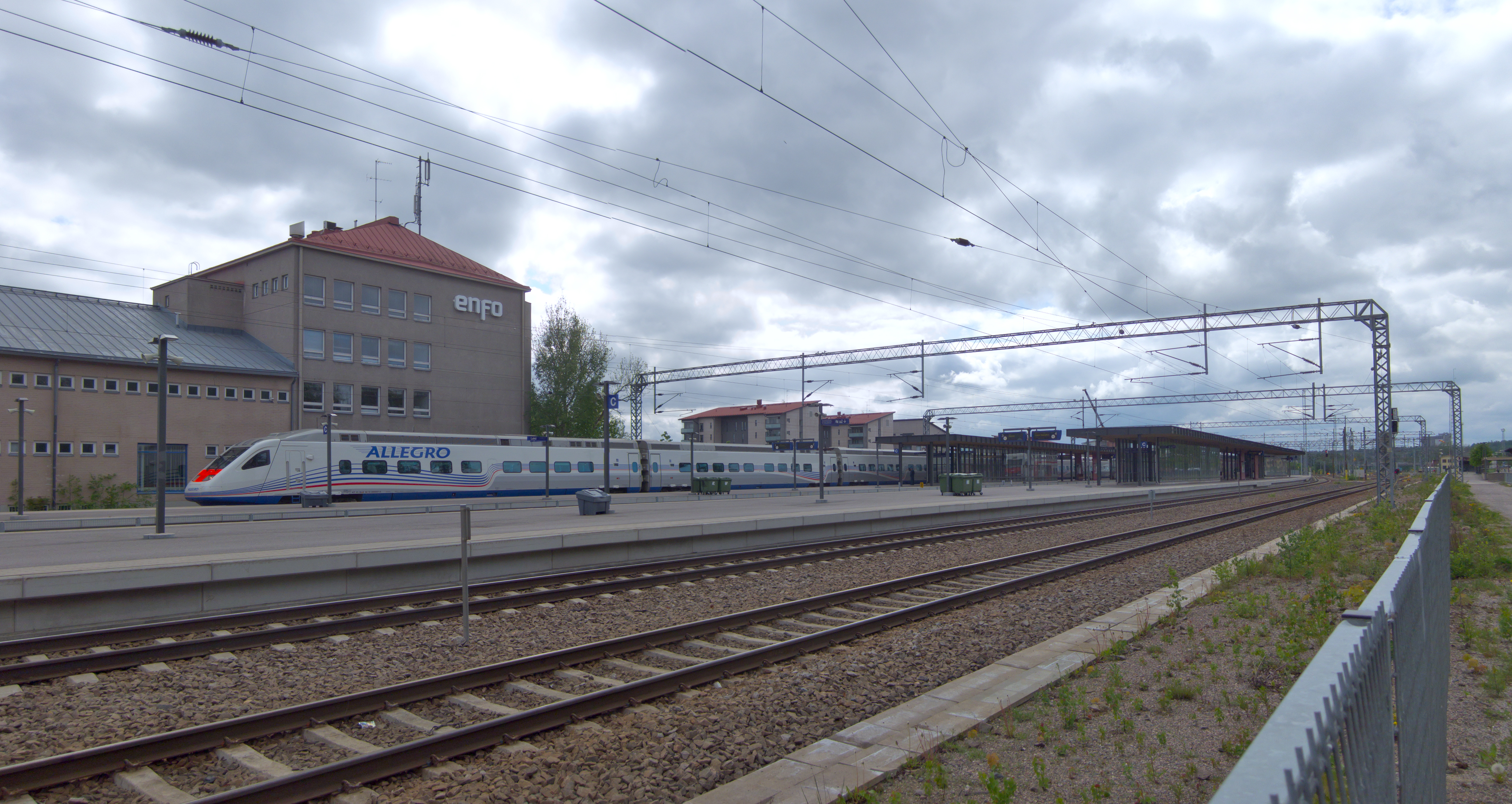
The Allegro high-speed train formerly connected Lahti to Saint Petersburg.

== See also ==
- Vesijärvi railway station
- Lahti bus station
