= Riihimäki railway station =

Railway station in Riihimäki, Finland

Riihimäki
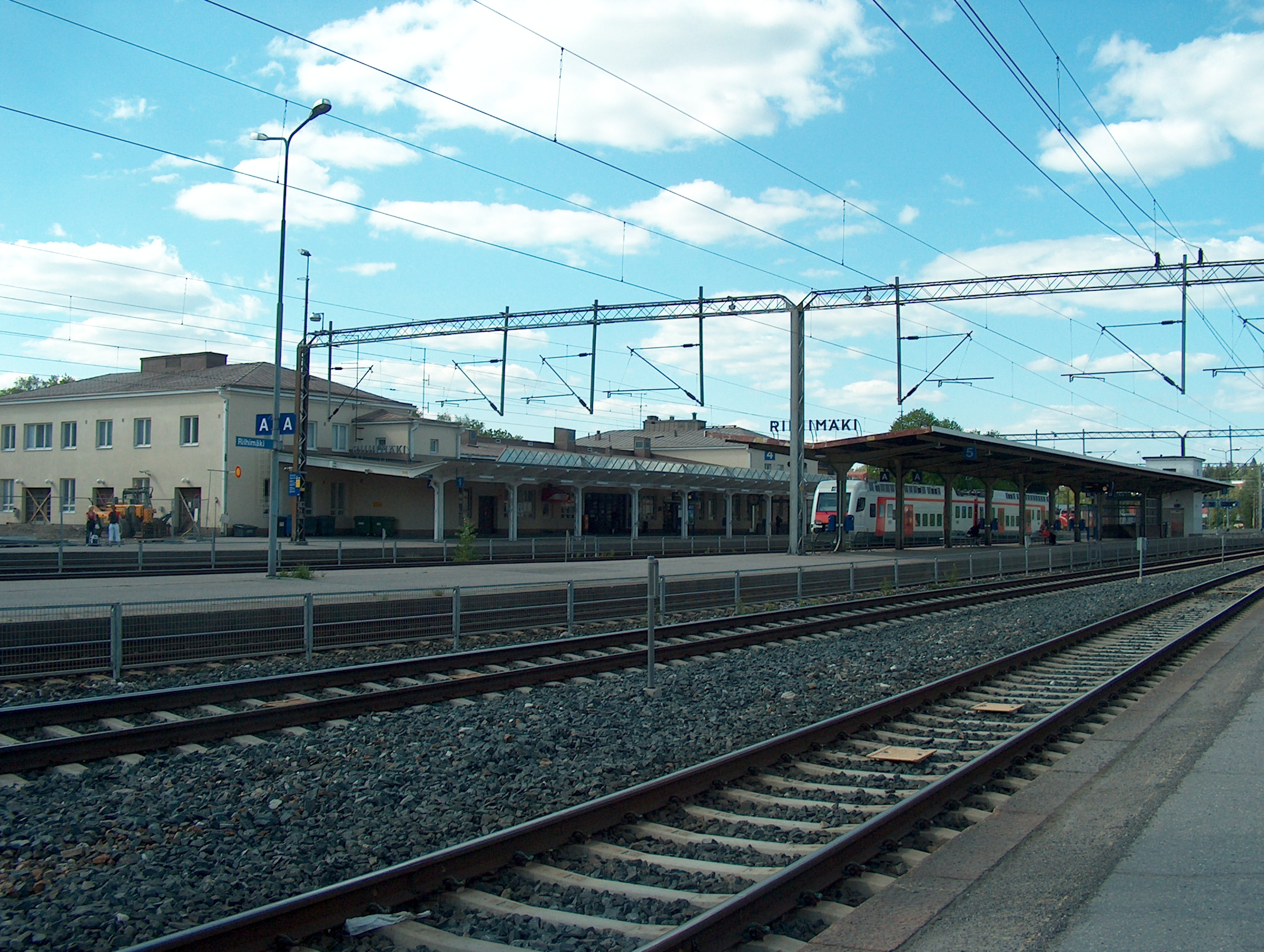
- Train platforms and station building

General information
- Location: Asemanaukio, 11130 Riihimäki
- Coordinates: 60°44′06″N 24°46′52″E
- System: VR station
- Owner: Finnish Transport Infrastructure Agency
- Lines: Helsinki–Riihimäki; Riihimäki–Tampere; Riihimäki–Lahti
- Platforms: 6 (one temporary)
- Tracks: 11

Construction
- Structure type: Ground

History
- Opened: 1862; 164 years ago

Passengers
- 2019: 878,740

Services
Preceding station	VR commuter rail	Following station
Hyvinkää towards Helsinki	T	Terminus
Hyvinkää towards Helsinki	D	Ryttylä towards Hämeenlinna
Hyvinkää towards Helsinki	R	Ryttylä towards Tampere
Terminus	G	Hikiä towards Lahti
Preceding station	VR Group	Following station
Tikkurila towards Helsinki	Helsinki–Riihimäki	Terminus
Terminus	Riihimäki–Tampere	Hämeenlinna towards Tampere
Location
- Location within Kanta-Häme Location within Finland

Riihimäki railway station (Finnish: Riihimäen rautatieasema, Swedish: Riihimäki järnvägsstation) is a railway station located in the town of Riihimäki, Finland.

The Finnish Heritage Agency has classified Riihimäki railway station along with the nearby former residential area of railway workers called Rautatienpuisto as nationally significant built cultural environment.

== History ==
Riihimäki is one of the original railway stations in Finland established on the country's first railway line opened in 1862. The original station building was planned to be built out of bricks, since the station was one of the candidates to become the starting point of a railway line to Saint Petersburg, Russia. As the location of the possible junction station remained unclear, the station building for the Riihimäki station was planned as wooden building in 1859. Due to financial issues the building planned was never built, and when the railway line was opened, Riihimäki station only had a warehouse, a water tower, a wooden shed and a platform shelter.

In 1868, a former work leader's house from 1857 was moved from Hyvinkää to the Riihimäki station to function as the station building, expanded with a two-storey additional structure. The building was expanded yet again in 1886 with new waiting rooms and restaurant spaces.

The construction of the railway line from Riihimäki to Saint Petersburg began 1867 and was completed in 1870. In 1907, a narrow-gauge railway to the shore of the Lake Kesijärvi at Loppi was built. The railway was originally horse-drawn but was converted into a steam locomotive railway in 1911. The railway served passenger traffic until 1949 and freight traffic until 1952. The railway was then scrapped.

The railway station and its surrounding regions were originally a part of Hausjärvi. A village started to form around the railway station after its opening. In 1900, the village had a population of about 600 people. In 1904, a sawmill was established in the village, followed by a glass factory in 1910. By 1914, the population had grown above 5 000. A densely populated community was established at Riihimäki in 1919 and three years later, Riihimäki separated from Hausjärvi becoming an independent market town.

The current functionalist style station building, designed by architect Thure Hellström, was completed in 1935. The new station building was originally supposed to be placed in the middle of the railyard, between the train tracks. These plans were discarded due to being too expensive.

The role of Riihimäki station as a major junction station somewhat decreased in September 2006, when the Kerava–Lahti line was opened and the long-distance trains via Lahti to eastern Finland and Russia were moved to run via the new line. A travel centre for buses was completed on the southern side of the station in 2009.

The railway station underwent a renovation in 2018–2021, during which the platforms were raised and the platform shelters, the lifts and the lighting was renewed. A temporary platform was also built on track 11. The third platform (tracks 7–8) was renovated in June 2019–September 2019, followed by the first platform renovated in September 2019–December 2019 and the second platform (tracks 4–5) in June 2020–October 2020. The underpass tunnel was also renovated in 2021.

== Train connections ==
Helsinki commuter rail:

- R-line trains (Helsinki–Riihimäki–Tampere)
- D-line trains (Helsinki–Hämeenlinna)
- T-line trains (Helsinki–Riihimäki, nighttime)
- G-line trains (Riihimäki–Lahti)

Long-distance:

- InterCity and Pendolino trains (Helsinki–Tampere, Helsinki–Pori, Helsinki–Jyväskylä–Pieksämäki)
- Overnight trains to Lapland (Helsinki–Kolari, Helsinki–Rovaniemi–Kemijärvi)

== Departure tracks ==
There are eleven tracks at the Riihimäki railway station of which six (1, 4, 5, 7, 8, 11) have platforms for passenger trains.

- Track 1 is used by southbound long-distance trains and some of the commuter trains (R, T) to Helsinki.
- Track 4 is used by northbound long-distance trains and a couple of R-line commuter trains to Tampere.
- Track 5 is used by commuter trains to Helsinki (D, R, T) and to Tampere (R).
- Track 7 is used by some few commuter trains to Helsinki (R, D) and to Lahti (G).
- Track 8 is used only by G-line commuter trains to Lahti.
- Track 11 is a temporary platform track used mostly by the G-line commuter trains during the station renovation.
