= Finnish Transport Infrastructure Agency =

Organization responsible for the maintenance of Finland's transport system

Väylävirasto Trafikledsverket

Government agency overview
- Formed: 1 January 2010 (as Finnish Transport Agency)
- Preceding agencies: Finnish Road Administration; Finnish Rail Administration; Finnish Maritime Administration
- Type: Government agency
- Jurisdiction: Finland
- Headquarters: Helsinki, Finland
- Employees: 430
- Annual budget: 2.1 billion € (2022)
- Government agency executive: Kari Wihlman
- Parent Government agency: Ministry of Transport and Communications of Finland
- Website: vayla.fi/en

The Finnish Transport Infrastructure Agency (Finnish: Väylävirasto, Swedish: Trafikledsverket) – FTIA in English or Väylä in Finnish – is a Finnish government agency responsible for road, rail, and waterway maintenance, operating under the Ministry of Transport and Communications.

The agency was launched in its current form on 1 January 2019. In 2025, the agency operated with an annual budget of 1.6 billion euros.

== History ==
=== 2010–2018 ===
The Finnish Transport Agency (Finnish: Liikennevirasto, Swedish: Trafikverket) was launched on 1 January 2010 to join three separate transportation agencies:

- Finnish Rail Administration (Finnish: Ratahallintokeskus or RHK, Swedish: Banförvaltningscentralen)
- Finnish Maritime Administration, (Finnish: Merenkulkulaitos, Swedish: Sjöfartsverket)
- Finnish Road Administration (Finnish: Tiehallinto, Swedish: Vägförvaltningen).

=== 2019 onwards ===
In 2019, the functions of the Finnish Transport Agency were split into three new instances:

- Traficom, the Finnish Transport and Communications Agency
- Fintraffic, Traffic Management Finland Oy (a state-owned limited company) [fi]
- Väylävirasto, responsible for maintenance

== Operations ==
=== Road network ===
The Finnish road network consists of highways, municipal street networks and private roads. Along with ten regional economic development centres [fi], the FTIA is responsible for the maintenance and development of the state-owned road network. There are 78,000 kilometres of highways maintained by the FTIA, of which about 50,000 are paved. In all, the Finnish road network is 454,000 kilometers long, of which about 350,000 are privately owned. There are a total of 5,000 kilometers of pedestrian walkways and bicycle tracks in Finland.

=== Railway network ===
The FTIA is responsible for the planning, construction and maintenance of the Finnish railway network, mainly used by VR but open to competition under the open access model since 2021. At the end of 2014, the total length of the Finnish railway network was 5,944 kilometers, of which 3,256 was electrified. The FTA spends about 200 million euros on rail infrastructure maintenance annually.

=== Waterways ===
The FTIA maintains approximately 8,300 kilometers of coastal fairway and 8,000 kilometers of inland waterways as part of Finland's waterway network. FTA is also responsible for producing charts (ENC & RNC) covering Finland waterways and coastal waters.
