= Tapanila =

Coordinates: 60.2644°N 25.0214°E

Tapanila Mosabacka
- Helsinki Subdivision
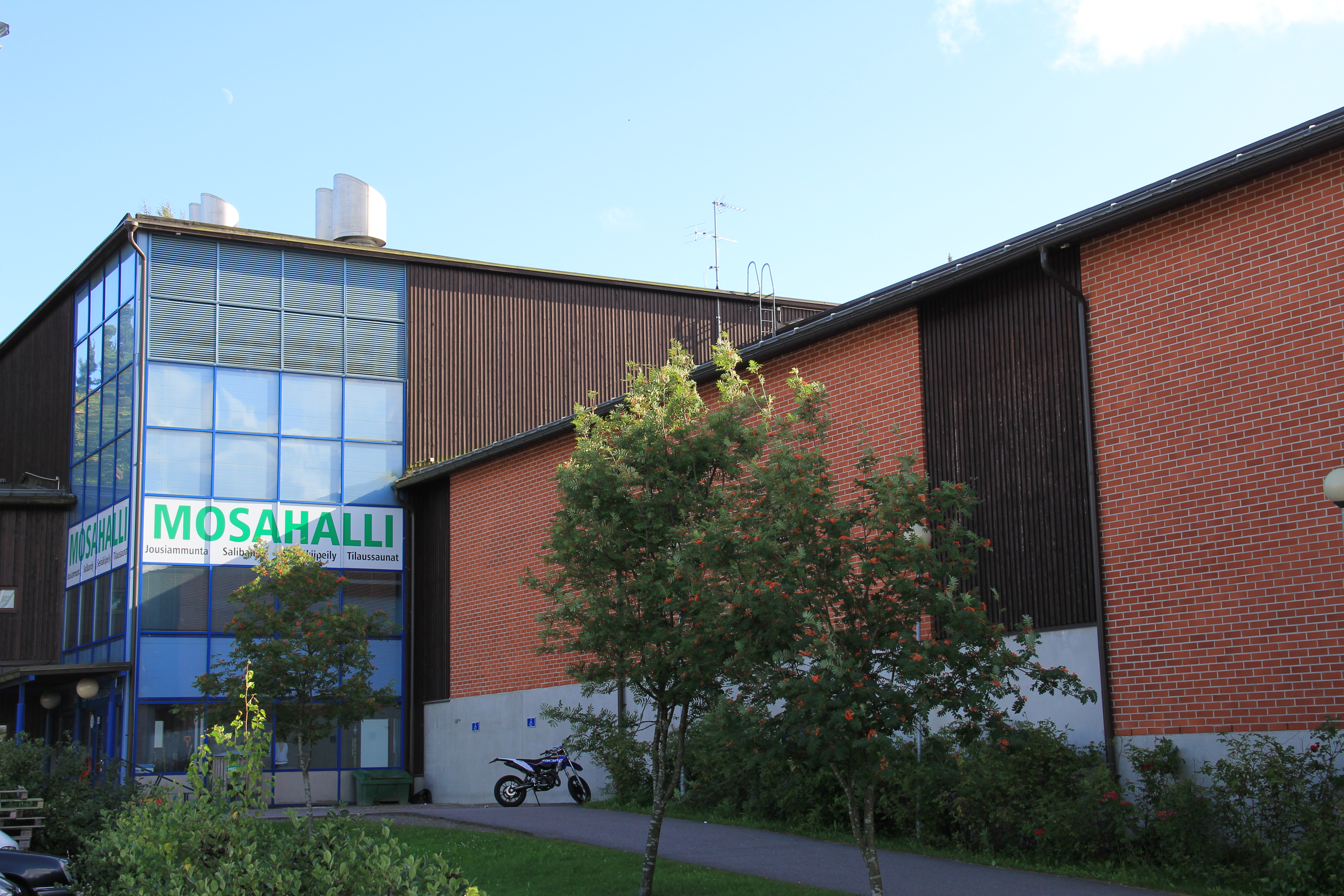
- Mosahalli sports hall in Tapanila

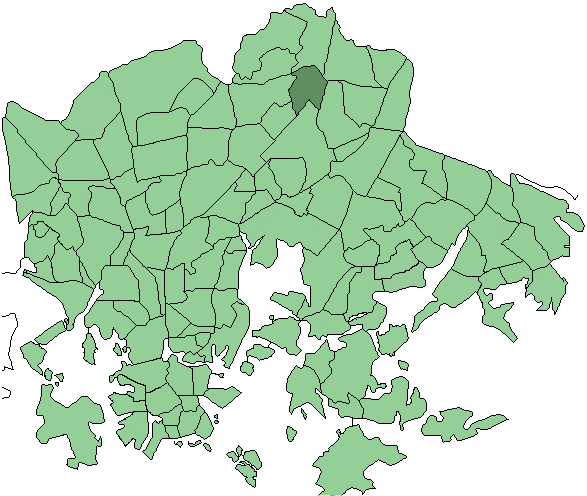
- Position of Tapanila within Helsinki
- Country: Finland
- Region: Uusimaa
- Sub-region: Greater Helsinki
- Municipality: Helsinki
- District: Malmi
- Area: 1.46 km^{2} (0.56 sq mi)
- Population (1.1.2005): 5,474
  - Density: 3,749/km^{2} (9,710/sq mi)
- Postal codes: 00730, 00731
- Subdivision number: 392
- Neighbouring subdivisions: Ylä-Malmi, Tapaninvainio, Tapulikaupunki, Malmin lentokenttä, Puistola and Ala-Malmi.

Tapanila (Swedish: Mosabacka) is a neighbourhood in Malmi district, Helsinki. Tapanila has a population of 5,474 inhabitants (2005). Tapanila has its own railway station.

It is known that there were few farm houses in Tapanila already in the 16th century. Back then Tapanila was one of the biggest villages in the Helsinki area. In 1862, railroad between Hämeenlinna and Tapanila was built. Tapanila was largely rebuilt from 1910–1935 based on Letchworth Garden City in England, the first in the Garden city movement. The area was annexed to Helsinki in 1946.

There is also Franzén's cottage in Tapanila, where the Finnish national author Aleksis Kivi lived in 1870. The cottage was built as employees' housing for railroad guards. In 1870 it was residence of Anders Gustav Franzen and now it is known as Franzen's croft (Finnish: Franzenin torppa); see article "Allotment system" for the explanation of the latter term.
