= Malmi railway station =

Railway station in Helsinki, Finland

Malmi Malm
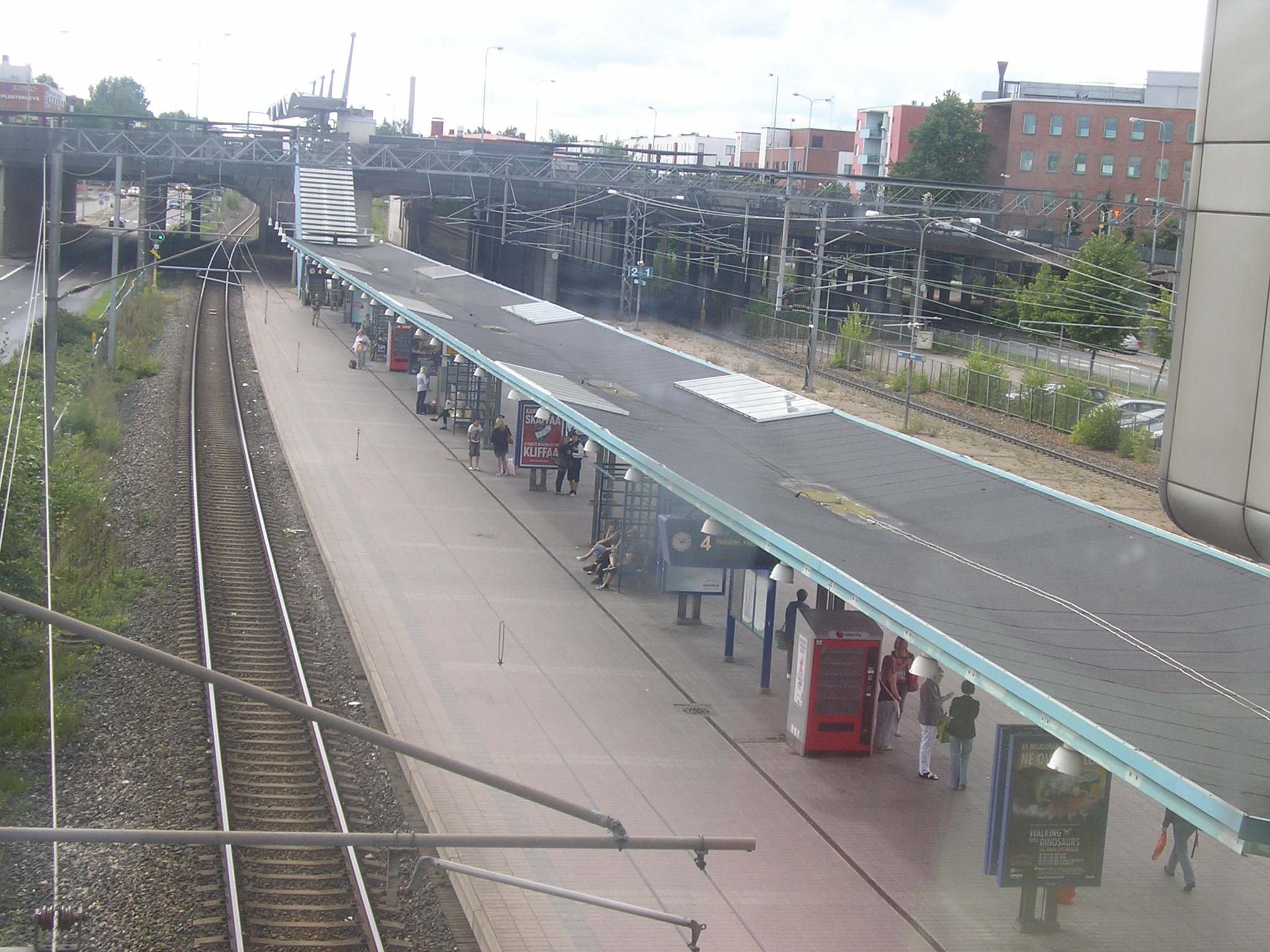

General information
- Coordinates: 60°15′07″N 025°00′44″E
- System: Helsinki commuter rail station
- Owner: Finnish Transport Agency
- Lines: I, P, T, K
- Platforms: 2
- Connections: bus lines 69, 70, 73/N, 74/N, 79/N, 552, 553/K, 554, 560, 561, 603, 701, 702, 703, 705

Construction
- Structure type: bridge station
- Accessible: 3

Other information
- Fare zone: B

History
- Opened: 1871
- Rebuilt: 1873, 1878, 1934, 1986
- Electrified: 1969

Passengers
- 2019: 6,530,693

Services
Preceding station	Helsinki commuter rail	Following station
Pukinmäki One-way operation	I counterclockwise via Tikkurila	Tapanila towards Helsinki via Airport
Tapanila One-way operation	P clockwise via Myyrmäki	Pukinmäki towards Helsinki
Pukinmäki towards Helsinki	K	Tapanila towards Kerava
Preceding station	VR commuter rail	Following station
Pukinmäki towards Helsinki	T	Tapanila towards Riihimäki
Location
- Location within Helsinki (mainland)

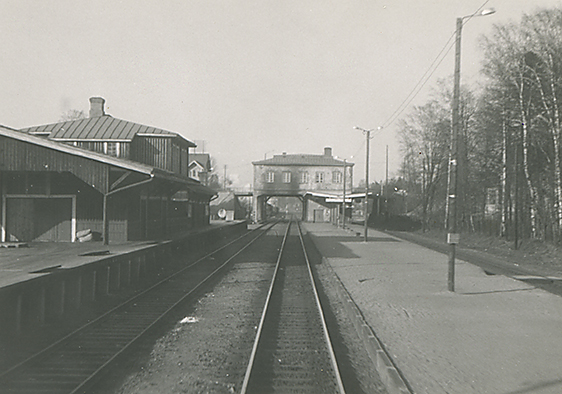
Third and old station building, platforms and tracks in 1965, before electrification

Malmi station (Finnish: Malmin rautatieasema, Swedish: Malms järnvägsstation) is a railway station in the Malmi district of Helsinki, Finland. It is located between the stations of Pukinmäki and Tapanila, along the main railroad track from Helsinki to Riihimäki, about 11 kilometres (7 mi) north from Helsinki Central.

The Finnish Heritage Agency has classified Malmi railway station as a nationally significant built cultural environment.

== History ==
Malmi railway station was opened as a stop in 1871, originally to serve a nearby army training ground. The first station building was completed in 1873 but was replaced by another one already in 1878. A large community formed quickly around the station which already had industry, workshops, an electric utilities and two schools in the 1910s.

When local train traffic began in Finland in summer 1886, Malmi acted as the terminus for two local train services on the Finnish main railway line (the other two continuing further up to Järvenpää). A new functionalist style station building designed by Thure Hellström was completed in 1934. The new building was exceptional from the station buildings of that time, since it was built above the train tracks. This station building was closed in 1986, as the current bridge station was completed. When the fourth track between Helsinki and Tikkurila was introduced in 1996, the trains making a stop at the station started using the eastern platform (tracks 3–4) while the western platform (tracks 1–2) was closed, only to be used in exceptions. The ticket sales office was closed in 2004.

=== Malmi Cemetery Railway ===
In 1894, a branch line was built from Malmi railway station to the Malmi Cemetery (fi:Malmin hautausmaan rautatie). The line was opened at the same time as the cemetery and the track diverged from the main line at the northern side of the station and then curved southwards to the cemetery. The branch line served funeral trains until December 1954 and has since been torn down.

== Departure tracks ==
Malmi railway station has four tracks all of which have a platform. Platform tracks 1–2 are unused by the passenger trains that stop at the station and are no longer accessible.

- Track 3 is used by I trains to the Helsinki Airport as well as K and T trains towards Kerava.
- Track 4 is used by P, K and T trains to Helsinki.

== Gallery ==
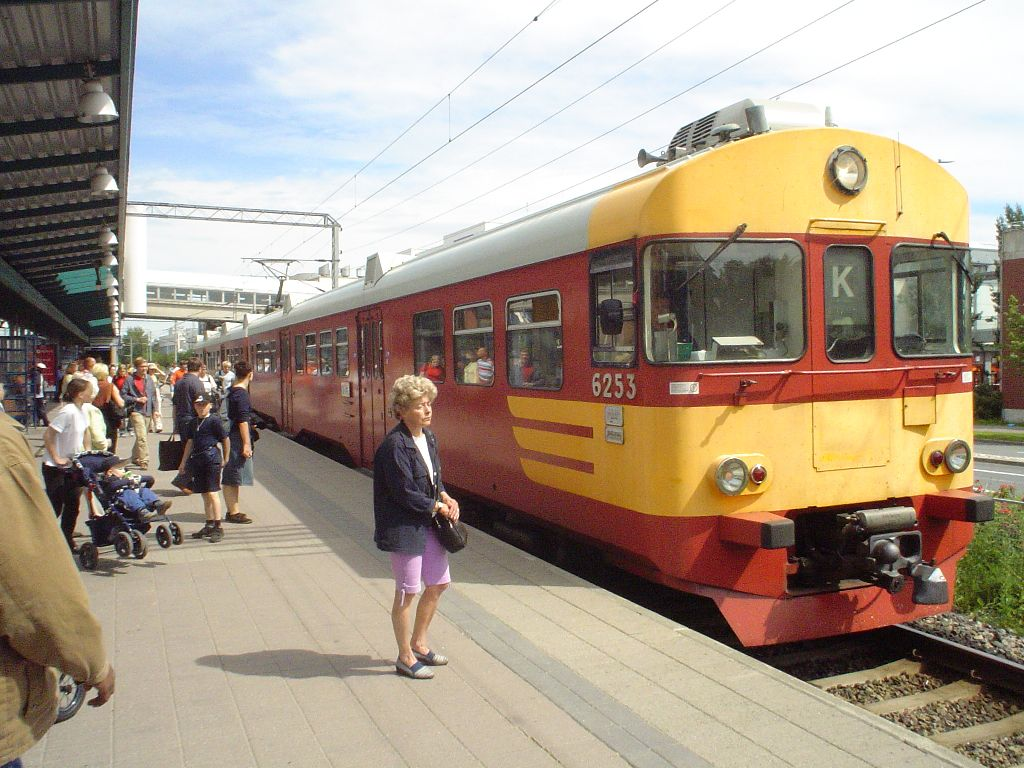
Southbound K-line train

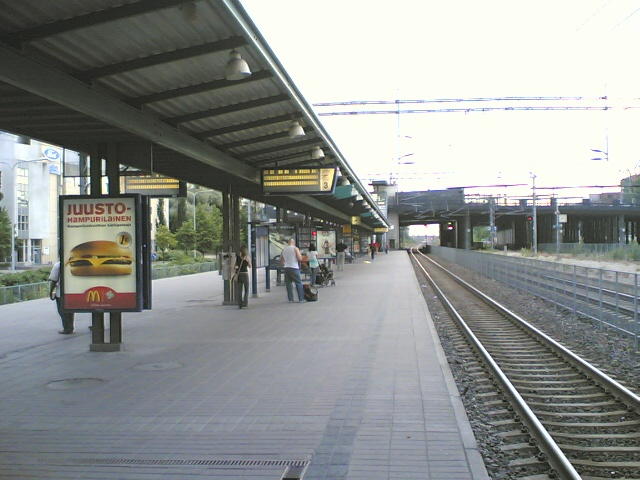
The station as seen from the platforms.
