= Pukinmäki railway station =

Railway station in Helsinki, Finland

Pukinmäki Bocksbacka
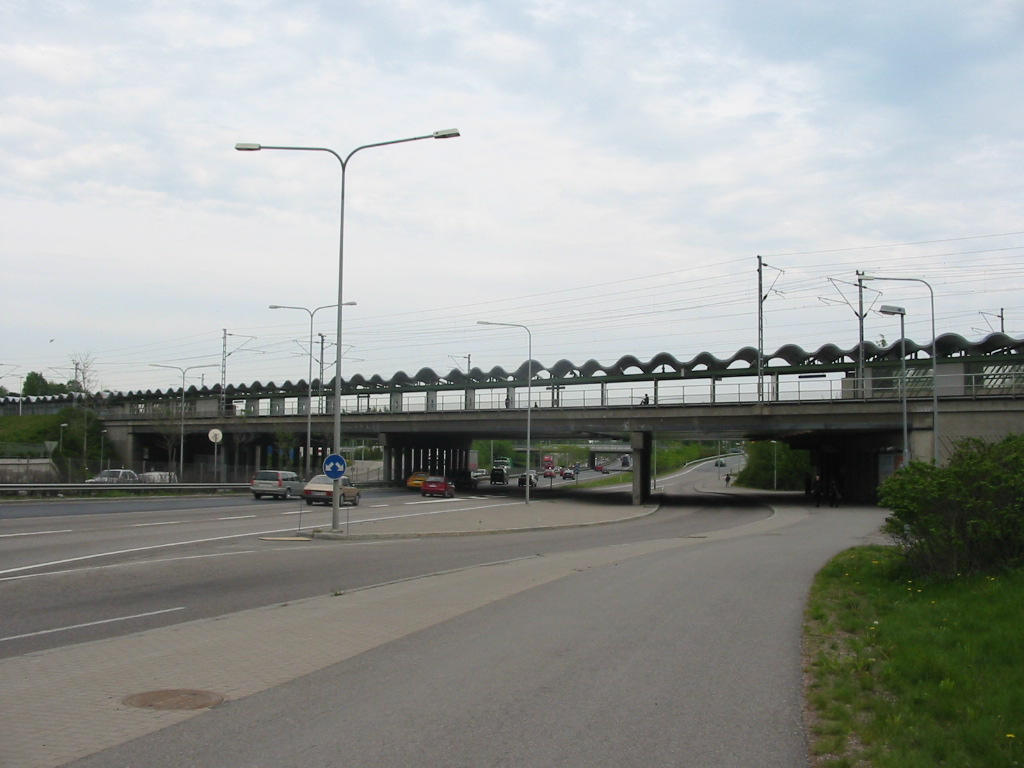

General information
- Location: Kehä I, Pukinmäki
- Coordinates: 60°14′31″N 24°59′36″E
- System: Helsinki commuter rail station
- Owner: Finnish Transport Agency
- Platforms: Island platform
- Tracks: 2
- Connections: bus lines 54, 61/N/T, 69, 70, 552, 553/K

Construction
- Structure type: Elevated station
- Accessible: 1

Other information
- Fare zone: B

Passengers
- 2019: 2,396,485

Services
Preceding station	Helsinki commuter rail	Following station
Oulunkylä One-way operation	I counterclockwise via Tikkurila	Malmi towards Helsinki via Airport
Malmi One-way operation	P clockwise via Myyrmäki	Oulunkylä towards Helsinki
Oulunkylä towards Helsinki	K	Malmi towards Kerava
Preceding station	VR commuter rail	Following station
Oulunkylä towards Helsinki	T	Malmi towards Riihimäki
Location
- Location within Helsinki (mainland)

Pukinmäki railway station (Finnish: Pukinmäen rautatieasema, Swedish: Bocksbacka järnvägsstation) is a railway station in the Pukinmäki district of Helsinki, Finland. It is located between the stations of Oulunkylä and Malmi, along the main railroad track from Helsinki to Riihimäki, on top of Kehä I. The station is served by commuter trains I, P, K and T.

== History ==
Pukinmäki railway station was originally opened in June 1886 near the Pukinmäki Manor as a small stop (known as laituri in the old classification of railway stations in Finland used until 1969) for local trains that operated under the Malmi railway station. At first, the stop was used only in the summer, but ten years later it was in use throughout the year. In the 1900s, the areas near the stop were turned into villa properties and in 1915 a densely populated community was formed in Pukinmäki.

The first station building was completed around 1910. The second station building, designed by architect Thure Hellström, was completed in 1934. The second building was closed as a station in 1982, when a new ticket sales office and a waiting room were completed on the northern side of Ring I. The ticket sales office was closed in 2000 and the office was converted into a restaurant.

== Departure tracks ==
Pukinmäki railway station has four tracks, of which tracks 1, 3 and 4 have platforms. The platform track 1 is unused by passenger trains that stop at the station and is no longer accessible.

- Track 3 is used by I trains to the Helsinki Airport as well as K and T trains towards Kerava.
- Track 4 is used by P, K and T trains to Helsinki.

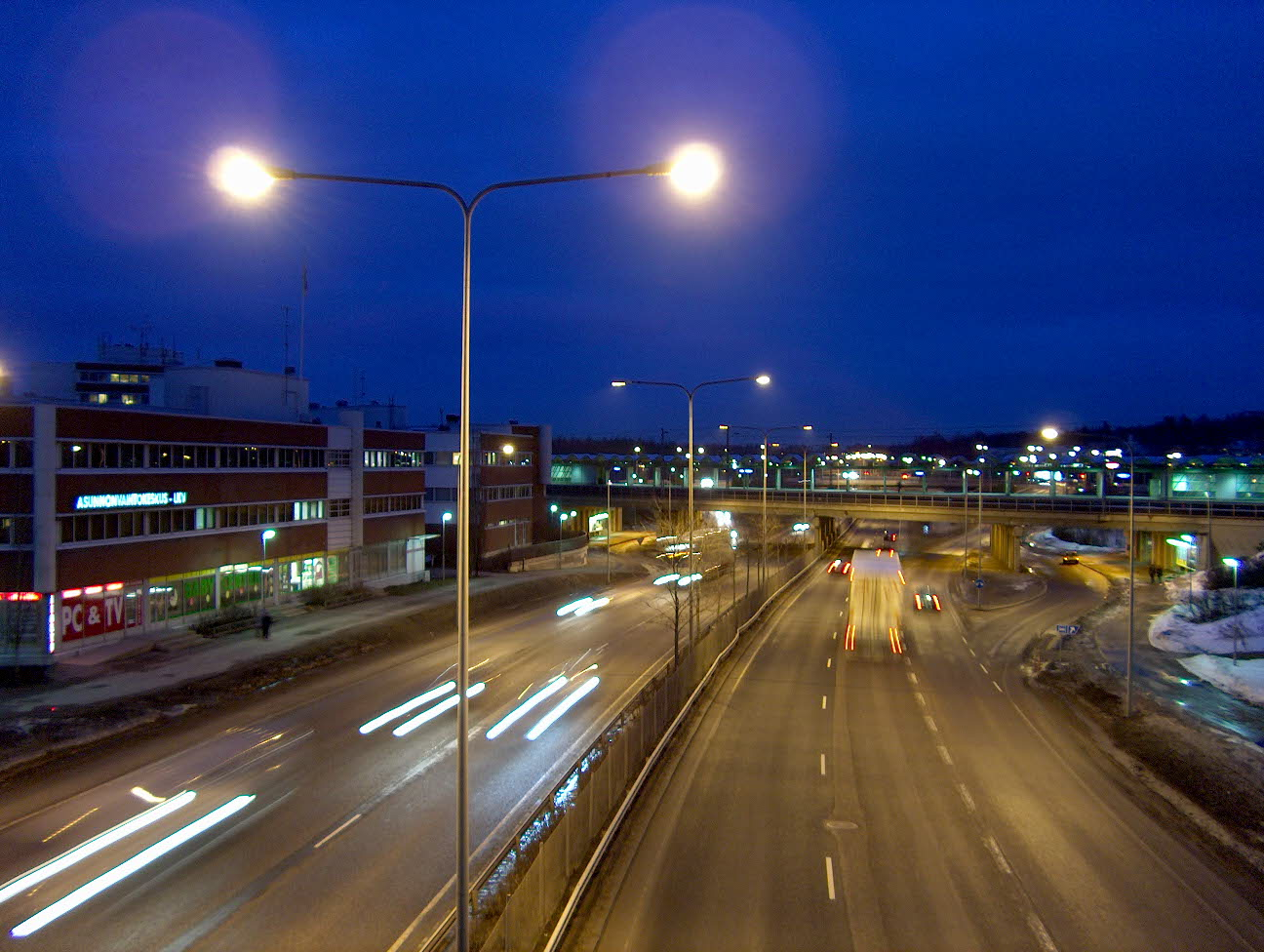
The station viewed from a nearby bridge. There are bus stops on either side of Kehä I under the station
