= Oulunkylä railway station =

Railway station in Helsinki, Finland

Oulunkylä Åggelby
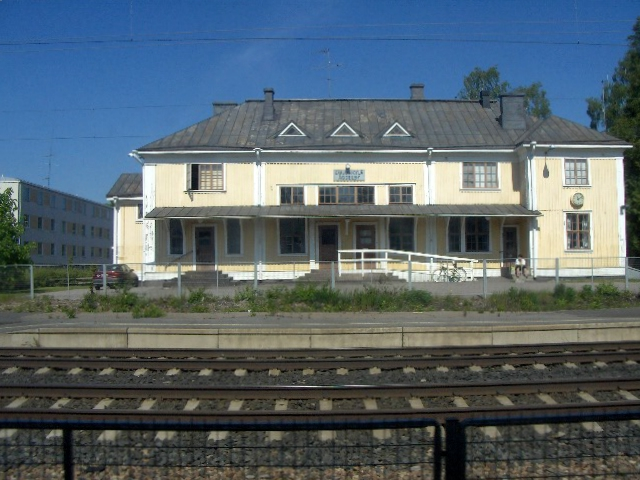

General information
- Location: Oulunkyläntori 2 A, 00640; Oulunkylä, Helsinki; Finland
- Coordinates: 60°13′41″N 024°58′00″E
- System: Helsinki commuter rail station
- Owner: Finnish Transport Infrastructure Agency
- Line: Helsinki–Riihimäki railway
- Platforms: 2 side platforms
- Connections: Helsinki buses 15

Construction
- Structure type: Bridge station
- Accessible: 1

Other information
- Station code: Olk
- Fare zone: B
- Classification: Part of split operating point (Helsinki)

History
- Opened: 1881

Passengers
- 2019: 2,736,736

Services
Preceding station	Helsinki commuter rail	Following station
Käpylä towards Helsinki	K	Pukinmäki towards Kerava
Käpylä One-way operation	I counterclockwise via Tikkurila	Pukinmäki towards Helsinki via Airport
Pukinmäki One-way operation	P clockwise via Myyrmäki	Käpylä towards Helsinki
Preceding station	VR commuter rail	Following station
Käpylä towards Helsinki	T	Pukinmäki towards Riihimäki
Location

Oulunkylä railway station (Finnish: Oulunkylän rautatieasema, Swedish: Åggelby järnvägsstation) is a railway station in the Oulunkylä district of Helsinki, Finland. It is located between the stations of Käpylä and Pukinmäki, along the main railroad track from Helsinki to Riihimäki, about 7 kilometres (4 mi) north of the Helsinki Central railway station.

The station building in Oulunkylä is no longer in use for train traffic, and the station does not have ticket sales.

== History ==
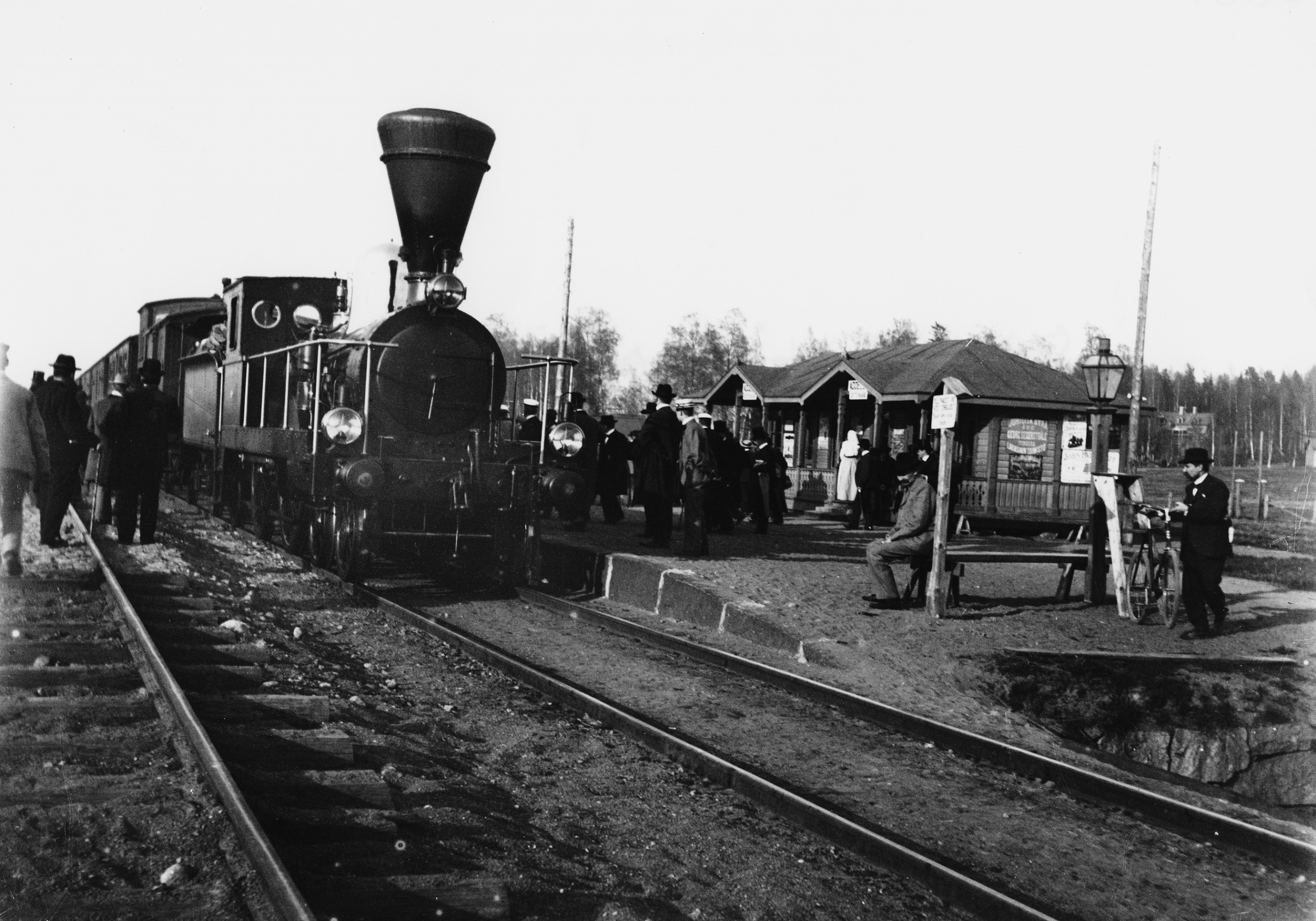
Åggelby (later Oulunkylä) in 1900-1903

As work on the Helsinki–Riihimäki railway was started in the 1850s, one of the workers' headquarters was established in the village of Åggelby. It was equipped with a residencies for use by the work chief, accountant and material scribe, as well as barracks for smiths and workers, the latter of which had capacity for 100 people at a given time. In addition, areas surrounding the village were acquired and rented by the government to accommodate 400 more workers.

In November 1857, the railway administration proposed establishing a kestikievari - a type of lodging tavern - in Åggelby, but the plan was met by resistance from the locals; their stance also got the backing of the justice department of the hundare of Helsinki. It was not until March 1859 that the plan was put into effect by declaration from provincial governor Antell. The kestikievari, headed by Johan Weurlander, was established in the estate of Månsas, and was reserved for use only by those whose travels directly concerned the railway project.

The railway was opened for traffic in 1862, but it took fifteen more years for Åggelby to receive a station of any kind as a freight platform was constructed in 1873. In December 1880, a group of people with summertime residencies in village, presumed to be public officials and military officers from Helsinki, proposed to the Railway Administration the establishment of a pysäkki (a station of lower significance, translating to "stop"). The proposal was accepted by the Railway Administration and the Finnish Senate, under the condition that the proposers should take on the responsibility of building and maintaining a road to the station. The owners of the estates that surrounded the area of the proposed station, J. H. Eklund of Månsas and M. W. Nyström of Petas and Nybondas, in April gave up their respective shares of the required land area to the Railway Administration, free of compensation, and the station was founded later that year. This enabled growth in the village: villas were built in its lands, and it was received the status of a taajaväkinen yhdyskunta – an autonomous part of the rural municipality of Helsinki. In 1921, it became an independent municipality, but was later annexed to Helsinki proper in 1946. The station had its Finnish name – Oulunkylä – officialized in 1925.

Oulunkylä's importance as a freight station grew in 1939 as the Herttoniemi railway was opened for traffic. The cargo-only track had several sidings, including one in Veräjälaakso, right by Oulunkylä proper. The railway also had a branch built to the Helsinki Metro depot in 1977. In addition, a siding from Oulunkylä to the Hankkija industrial area was built in 1974. The line to Herttoniemi fell out of use as the oil harbour was closed in 1992 and most of the line was dismantled; however, the metro siding remained. It was later rebuilt with grooved rails to accommodate the Jokeri trunk bus line.

As of 2005, Oulunkylä has been one part of the split railway operating point of Helsinki. The others currently include the passenger stations of Helsinki, Pasila, Käpylä and Ilmala, the Pasila freight and car loading stations, the Ilmala depot and the Helsinki Kivihaka crossover.

== Station building ==
The first station building that was constructed upon the establishment of Oulunkylä as a pysäkki in 1881 was located to the east of the railway. At some point, it was relocated and repurposed as housing for the staff of the Finnish State Railways. A new station was built in the early 1900s, but it was presumably destroyed in a fire soon after. The third and final station was built in 1922, this time to the west of the tracks. Its blueprints are dated to 1919. It was transferred into the possession of Senate Properties in 2007.

A new signal box was constructed in 1973.

== Services ==
Oulunkylä is served by lines K, T, I and P on the Helsinki commuter rail network.

== Departure tracks ==
Oulunkylä has two platform tracks for passenger trains (3, 4). Track 1 has a short platform that is unused by the passenger trains that stop at the station and is no longer accessible.

- Track 3 is used by I trains to the Helsinki Airport as well as K and T trains towards Kerava.
- Track 4 is used by P, K and T trains to Helsinki.

== links ==
- Media related to Oulunkylä railway station at Wikimedia Commons
