= Tapanila railway station =

Railway station in Helsinki, Finland

Tapanila Mosabacka
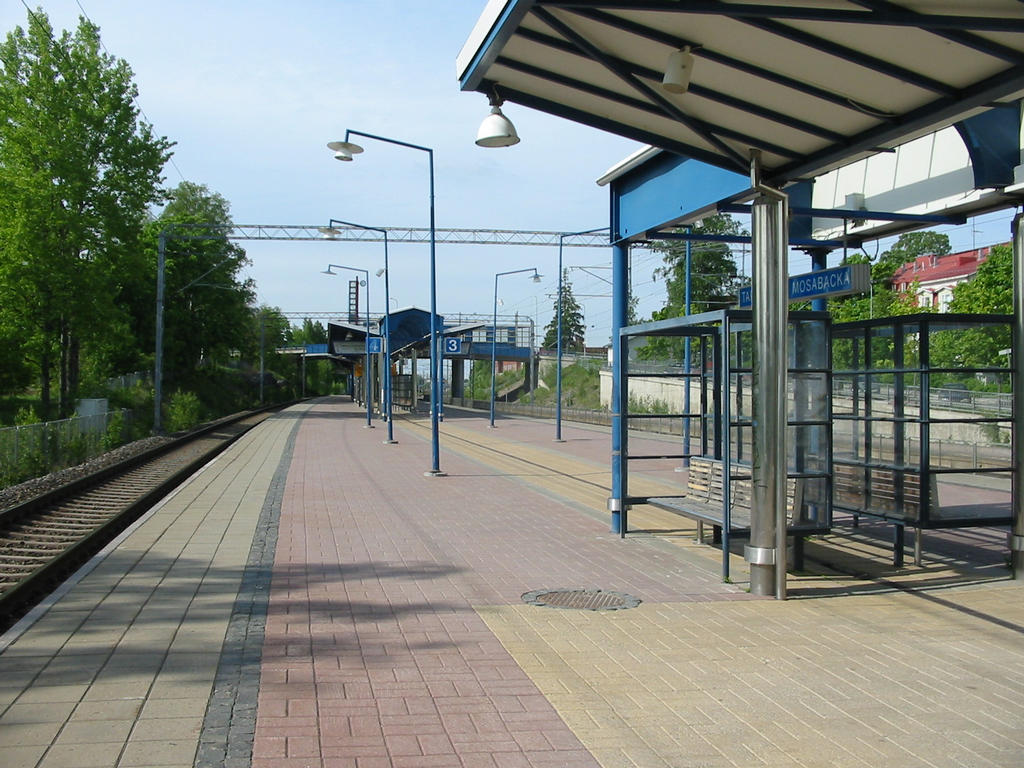

General information
- Coordinates: 60°15′43″N 25°1′40.5″E
- System: Helsinki commuter rail station
- Owner: Finnish Transport Agency
- Lines: I, P, K, T
- Platforms: 1
- Connections: bus lines 74, 74N, 705

Construction
- Structure type: ground station
- Accessible: 1

Other information
- Fare zone: B

Passengers
- 2019: 1,623,986

Services
Preceding station	Helsinki commuter rail	Following station
Malmi One-way operation	I counterclockwise via Tikkurila	Puistola towards Helsinki via Airport
Puistola One-way operation	P clockwise via Myyrmäki	Malmi towards Helsinki
Malmi towards Helsinki	K	Puistola towards Kerava
Preceding station	VR commuter rail	Following station
Malmi towards Helsinki	T	Puistola towards Riihimäki
Location
- Location within Helsinki (mainland)

Tapanila (Finnish) or Mosabacka (Swedish) is a railway station in the Tapanila district of Helsinki, Finland. It is located between the stations of Malmi and Puistola, along the main railroad track from Helsinki to Riihimäki, about 13 kilometres northeast from the Helsinki Central railway station.

== History ==
Tapanila railway station was opened as a small stop in 1907. The stop was originally named Vanda, but was renamed as Mosabacka already in the next year. The first station building was completed in 1910. A new station building was completed in 1939 but was moved to Pikku Huopalahti in 1991. Nowadays Tapanila has no station building.

== Departure tracks ==
Tapanila railway station has two platform tracks for passenger trains (3, 4). Track 1 has a short platform that is unused by the passenger trains that stop at the station and is no longer accessible.

- Track 3 is used by I trains to the Helsinki Airport as well as K and T trains towards Kerava.
- Track 4 is used by P, K and T trains to Helsinki.

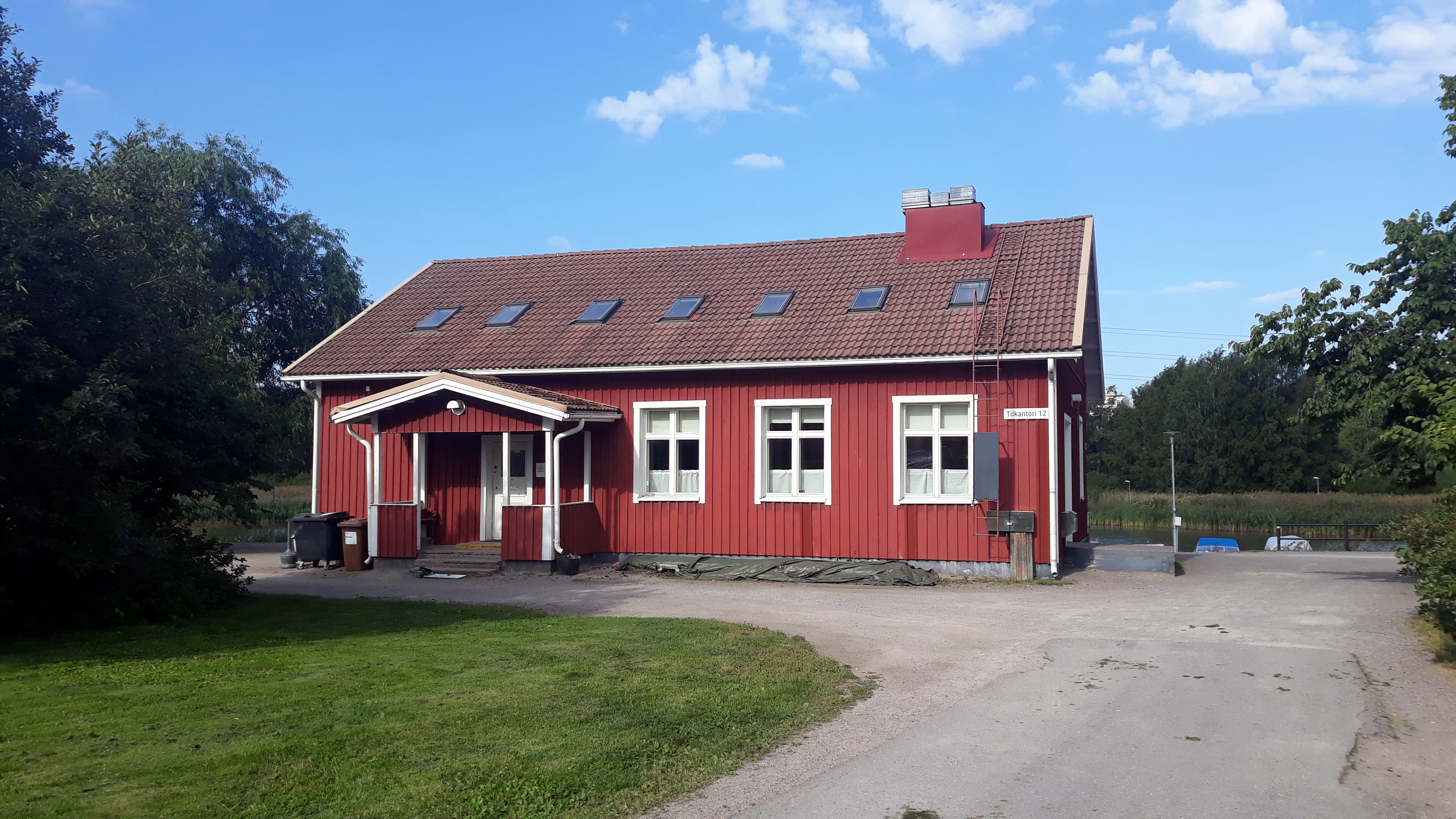
The former station building, now located in Pikku Huopalahti.
