= Dixi (building) =

Retail building in Vantaa, Finland

Coordinates: 60°17′34.8″N 25°2′37.68″E

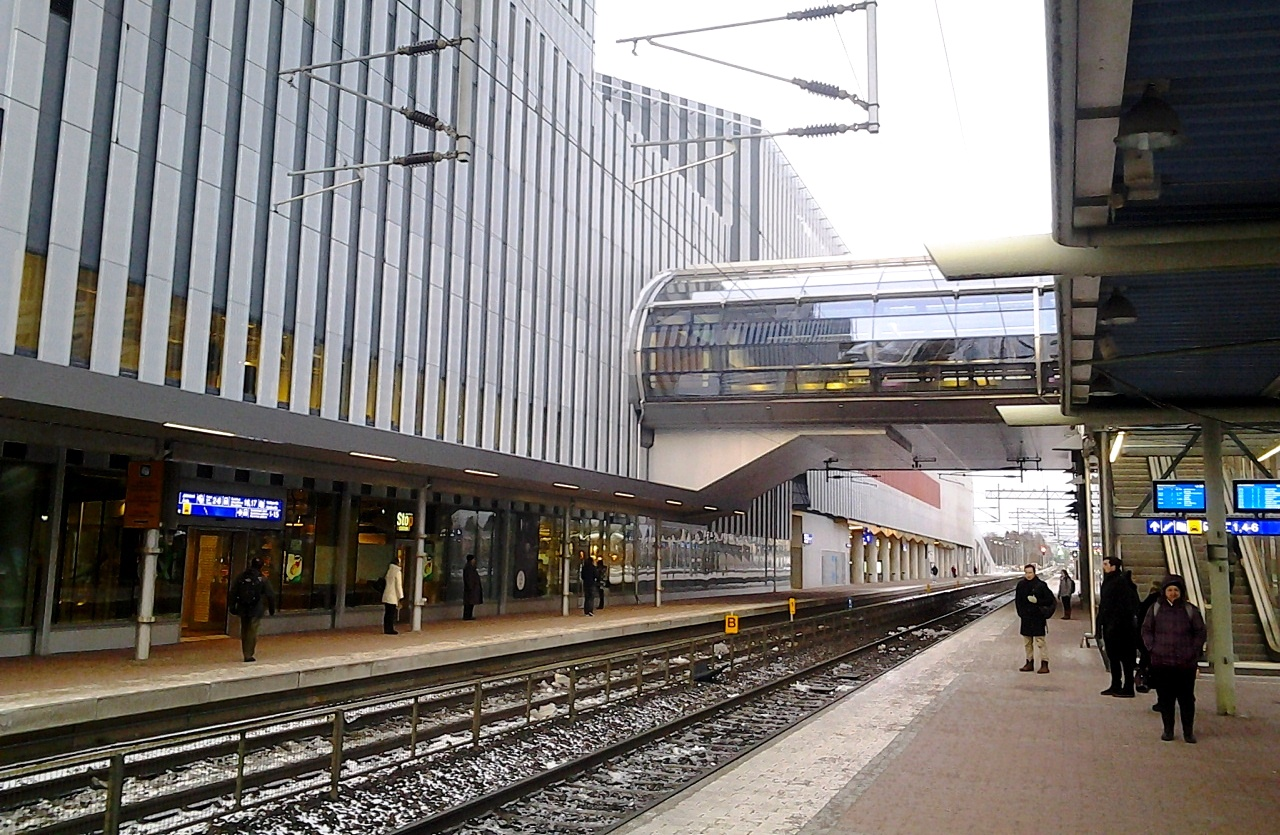
Dixi (on the left) seen from the platform of the Tikkurila railway station.

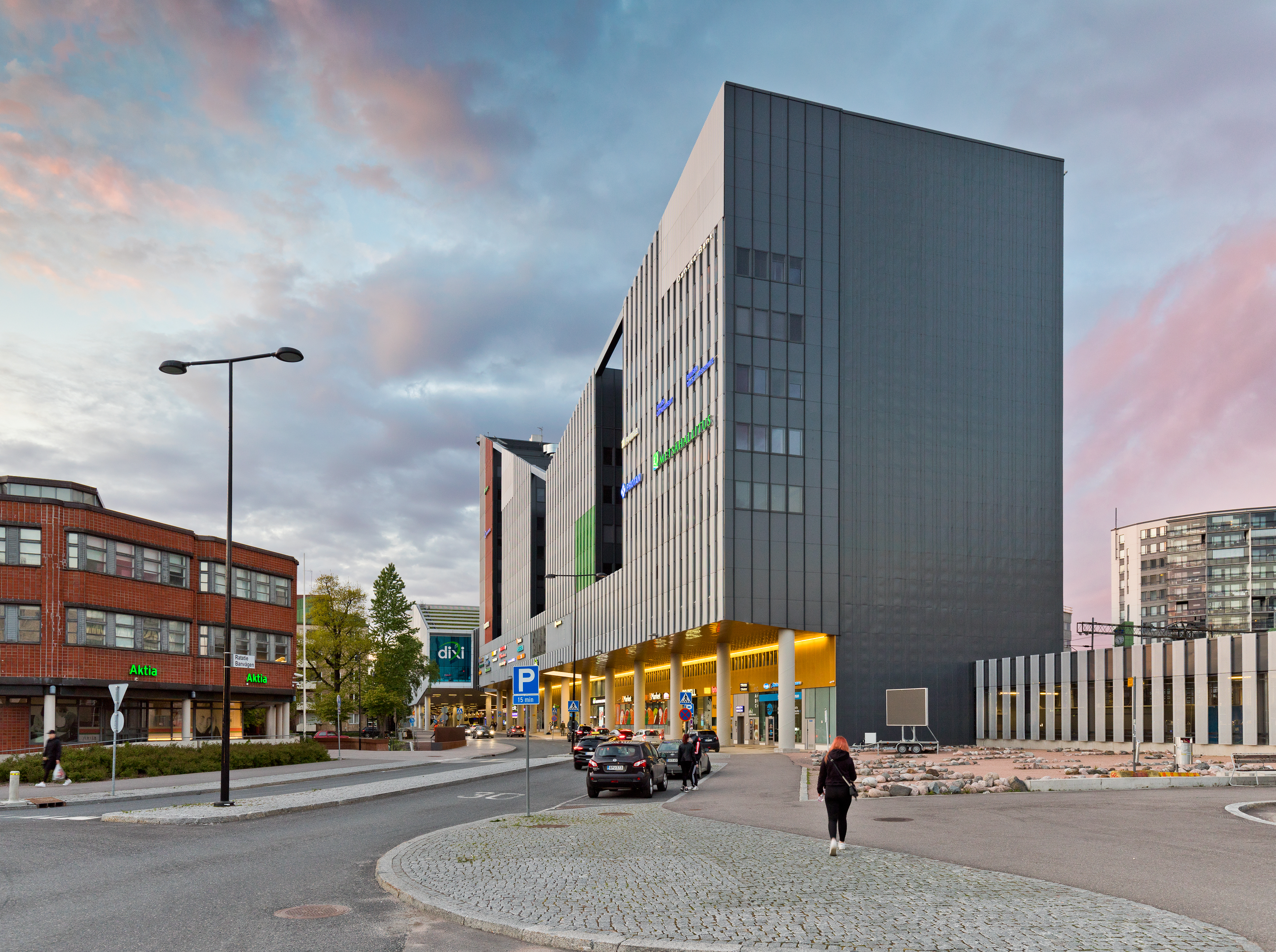
Dixi seen from the south from Ratatie.

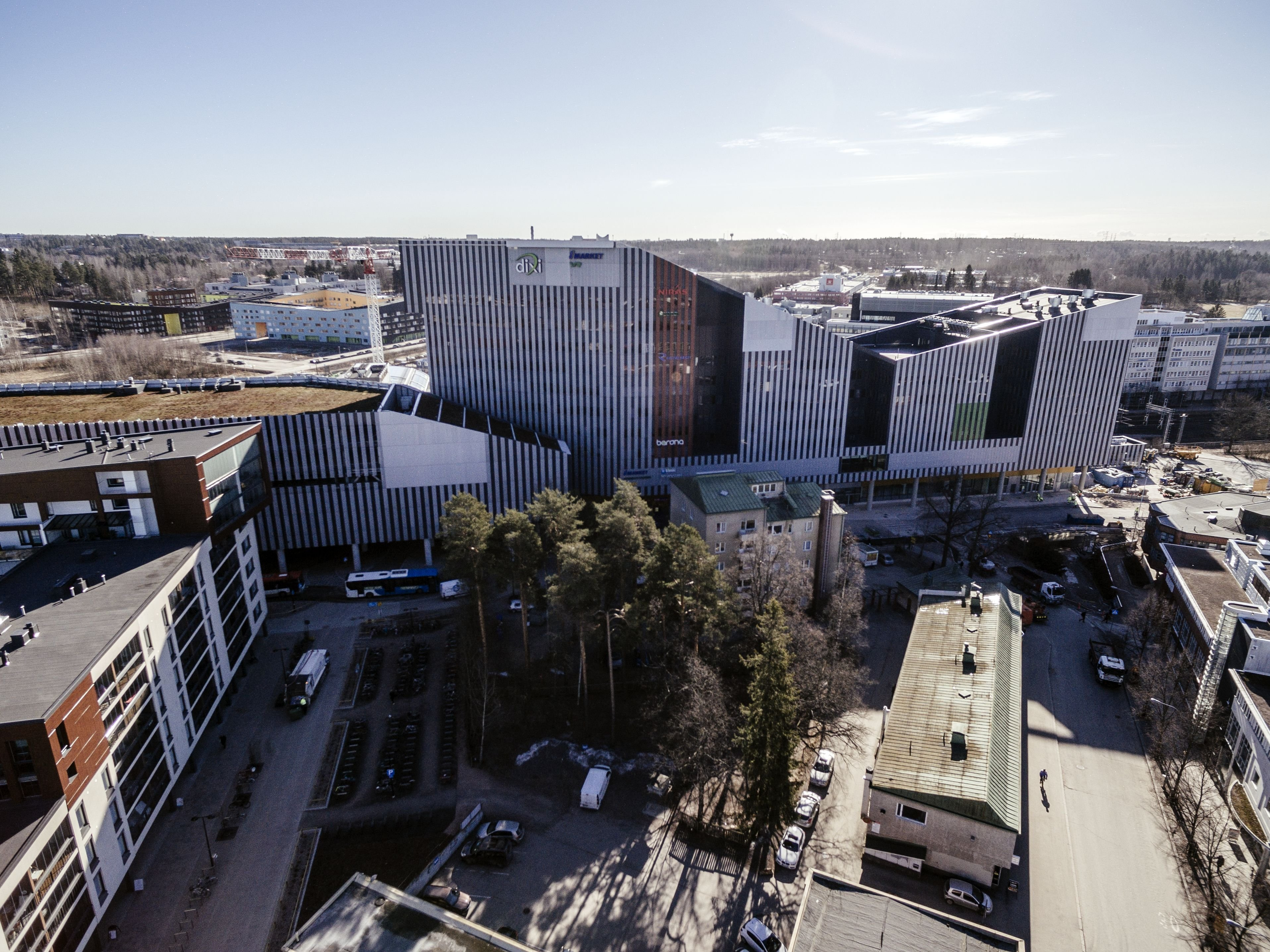
Dixi and the station environment seen from the west. In the foreground is the Asematie street.

Dixi is a combined office, shopping and transport centre in Tikkurila, Vantaa, Finland, in connection to the Tikkurila railway station. Dixi is located to the west of the railway track, to the north of the old station building. The shopping centre was opened in 2015 and was expanded with a 100-metre-long (330 ft) expansion in 2017, with an upcoming final phase of a further 6,000 m^{2} (65,000 sq ft) of office space to its southern part on Ratatie.

The building contains plenty of office space and about thirty businesses, including kiosks, cafés, restaurants, special businesses, a medical station, barbershops, a gym, a service point of the city of Vantaa (Vantaa-info), VR Group ticket sales and an S-market grocery store. The bus terminal of the Tikkurila railway station was moved to Dixi with the buses driving to the open bottom floor of the shopping centre. There is a grass roof the size of a football field on top of the building.

Dixi can be accessed from the west from Ratatie, which handles the arriving connections of the bus terminal or from the railway platforms via a station bridge with a roof and glass walls connecting to the third floor. The station bridge and most of the railway platforms are actually located in the neighbouring district of Jokiniemi. However, the businesses on the station bridge are not counted as part of the Dixi shopping centre. On the other end of the station bridge is also located the Väritehtaankatu 8 office and business building in Jokiniemi, which is not part of Dixi. This building hosts offices, a lunch restaurant and a gym. The second phase of the building on Väritehtaankatu was completed in late 2021, consisting of an additional building with six floors and a total floor space of 4,000 m^{2} (43,000 sq ft).

== First phase ==
Dixi's first phase consisted of a shopping centre, an office tower, a bus station at the ground floor and a parking garage. The 250-metre-long shopping centre opened in 2015 has three floors. The first phase has a total floor area of 34,000 m^{2} (370,000 sq ft), of which the shopping centre has about 8,300 and the office tower has about 8,400. The parking garage has spaces for five hundred cars and an area of 17,300 m^{2} (186,000 sq ft). At the time of its opening, the shopping centre was owned by Nordic Real Estate Partners and the office tower by the Ilmarinen Mutual Pension Insurance Company. In 2019 the ownership was transferred to the Finnish eQ real estate company. Floors 4 through 11 of the office tower host premises for the Helsinki and Uusimaa Hospital District, Terveystalo and Barona.

== Second and third phase ==
Dixi's second phase was built in the place of the former ticket sales office; the building has 12 floors and hosts office and business spaces. The business spaces of the second phase were opened on 27 April 2017.

The third phase is under planning. The final phase will be built to the south end of the building next to the Ratatie intersection to an area of 600 m^{2} (6,500 sq ft), but the project consists of a total of 6,000 m^{2} (65,000 sq ft) of floor space on several floors. The additional building will have eight floors. After the completion of the final phase, the final extent of the building from the driveway to its southern end will be approximately 450 metres (1,480 ft) in length and a total of 57,000 m^{2} (610,000 sq ft).
