= Käpylä railway station =

Railway station in Helsinki, Finland

Käpylä Kottby
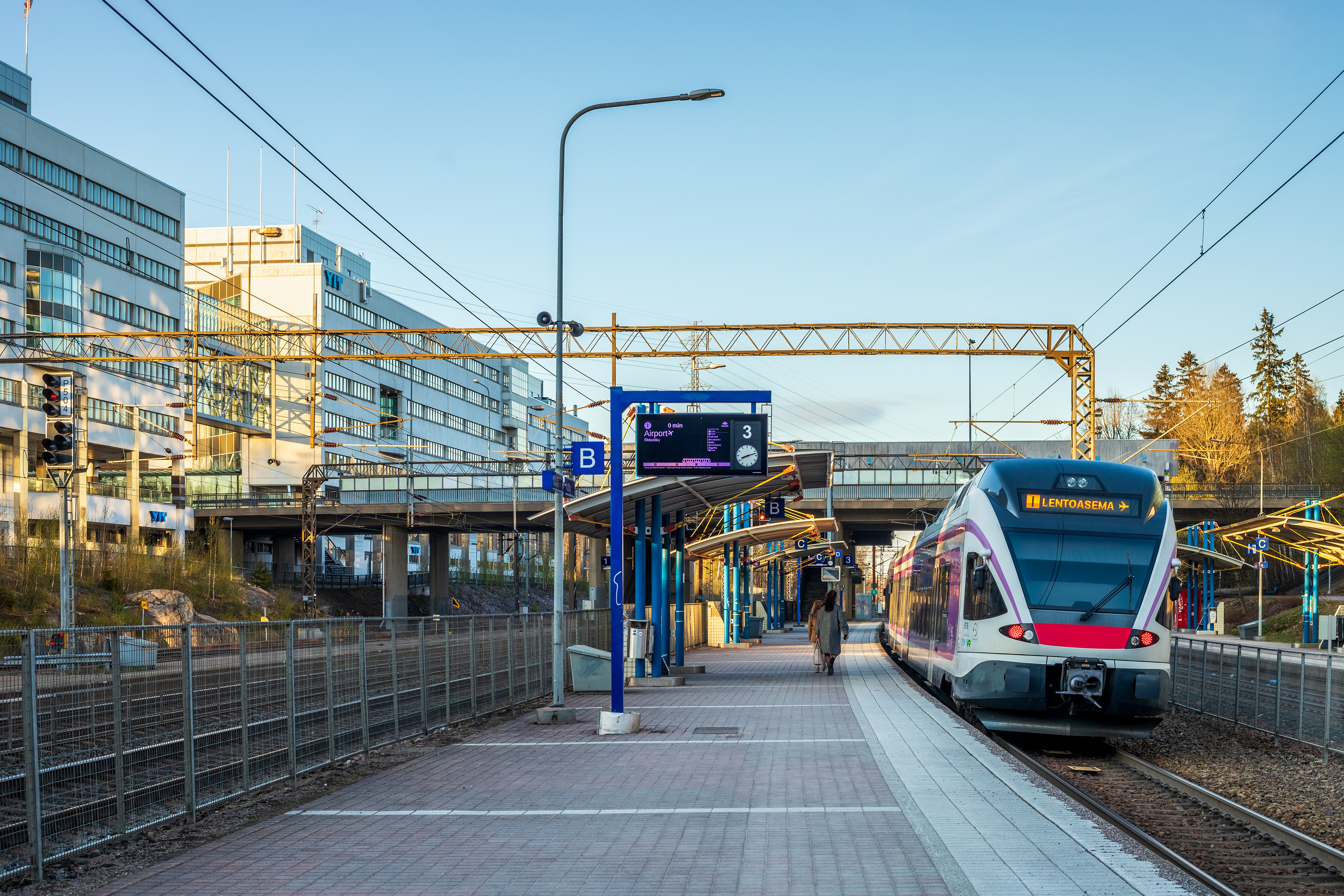

General information
- Location: Panuntie 9, 00620; Käpylä, Helsinki; Finland
- Coordinates: 60°13′14″N 24°56′51″E
- System: Helsinki commuter rail station
- Owner: Finnish Transport Agency
- Line: Helsinki–Riihimäki railway
- Platforms: 2 side platforms
- Tracks: 2
- Connections: Helsinki buses

Construction
- Accessible: 1

Other information
- Station code: Käp
- Fare zone: A
- Classification: Part of split operating point (Helsinki)

History
- Opened: 1910

Passengers
- 2019: 1,446,326

Services
Preceding station	Helsinki commuter rail	Following station
Pasila towards Helsinki	K	Oulunkylä towards Kerava
Pasila One-way operation	I counterclockwise via Tikkurila	Oulunkylä towards Helsinki via Airport
Oulunkylä One-way operation	P clockwise via Myyrmäki	Pasila towards Helsinki
Preceding station	VR commuter rail	Following station
Pasila towards Helsinki	T	Oulunkylä towards Riihimäki
Location

Käpylä (Finnish) or Kottby (Swedish) is a railway station in the Käpylä district of Helsinki, Finland. It is located between the stations of Pasila and Oulunkylä, along the main railroad track from Helsinki to Riihimäki, about 6 km north from the Helsinki Central railway station.

== History ==
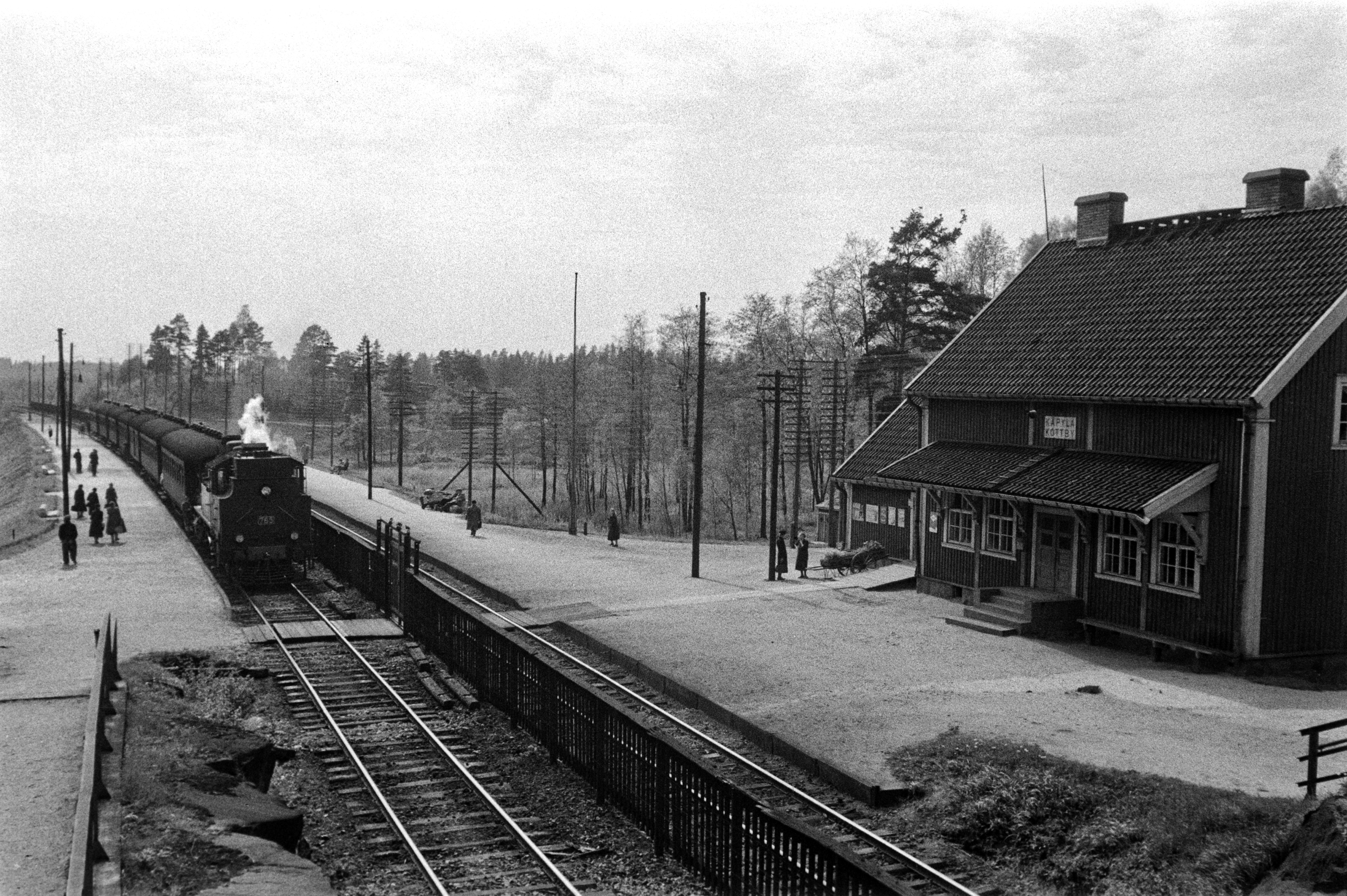
A local train arriving in Käpylä in 1950

The Kottby station was opened as a pysäkki (a station of lower significance, translating to "stop") in 1910, and its first station house was completed in the same year. At the time, it was situated on a nigh entirely uninhabited area on the northern outskirts of Helsinki that had been annexed to the city just four years prior. At this time, the first few kilometers of the Helsinki–Riihimäki railway ran from the Helsinki central station to the Fredriksberg (currently Pasila) lower rail yard, via the current location of the Ilmala depot. This changed in 1920 as the Fredriksberg station was relocated further east, along with the rest of the Helsinki–Kottby segment.

In 1922, a new two-floor station building was constructed; the old, smaller station was moved to Nuppulinna. In 1924, the Panuntie overpass was constructed. It was part of the Tuusulantie road until the motorway section of national road 45 was completed midway through the 1960s. The station had its Finnish name – Käpylä – officialized in 1925.

The station lies quite some distance away to the northwest of the suburbs of Käpylä, the bulk of which were built in the interwar period. The station building fell out of use as Käpylä was made an unstaffed halt in 1963; it was dismantled at some point towards the end of the 1970s. The station was connected with the Ilmala depot in 1969 with the construction of a siding.

As of 2005, Käpylä has been one part of the split railway operating point of Helsinki. The others currently include the passenger stations of Helsinki, Pasila, Oulunkylä and Ilmala, the Pasila freight and car loading stations, the Ilmala depot and the Helsinki Kivihaka crossover.

== Services ==
On the Helsinki commuter rail network, Käpylä is served by lines K to Kerava, I and P to the Helsinki Airport, and nighttime line T to Riihimäki. All of these lines make stops at all stations on their routes. The station has a HSL ticket vending machine, as well as elevators and 55 centimetres (22 in) high platforms for accessibility.

Bus stops bearing the station's name are found on Panuntie street, crossing over the platforms on the eastern side of the station, as well as on the Tuusulanväylä highway and its interchange ramps on the western side. Both sides also have city bike terminals, positioned right by the respective pedestrian overpasses. The Käpylä station, as well as its surrounding bus stops, belong to HSL fare zone A.

== Departure tracks ==
Käpylä railway station has three platform tracks. Track 1 is not used by passenger trains that stop at the station and is no longer accessible for passengers.

- Track 3 is used by I trains to the Helsinki Airport as well as K and T trains towards Kerava.
- Track 4 is used by P, K and T trains to Helsinki.
