= Tapaninkylä dumping ground =

Highly Chemicalised and Fertile Tapaninkyla

Coordinates: 60°15′51″N 025°00′54″E

The Tapaninkylä dumping ground was a dumping ground in Helsinki Rural Commune, present Tapaninkylä, Helsinki. It was put into use by The Finnish State Railways in 1903, and remained in use until 1944. In 1946, the area was annexed to Helsinki. The area is now known as the Hiidenkivi Park.

== History ==
The history of the site began when the State Railways acquired the area through compulsory purchase. The area was located between the streets of Rajatie, Kotinummentie and Vanha Tapanilantie. It was used to take gravel to be used for railroad construction. In 1903, the city of Helsinki decided to make the site its dumping ground. At the time, the site was located far from the city, in the countryside. Waste was partly taken to the site by train, which was unique in Finland. A branch line went to the site.

The waste taken to the site was mainly domestic waste. The area was not guarded. Hazardous materials have only been found in minute quantities, since at the time the waste was mainly organic waste that decomposed easily.

== The history of the settlement and commercial gardens ==
Human dwellings began to emerge in the vicinity of the site, mainly the dwellings of the city sanitation workers. Due to the possibility of easy acquisition of fertilizing matter, commercial gardens also sprang up in the area. They numbered only about 20, but they were rather sizable. The dumping ground aided the gardeners a great deal, since the landfill decomposed easily, and it contained much manure.

The long period of use of the dumping ground, over 40 years, indicates that the waste decomposed completely, and it also reflects the fact that the waste turned into fertilizing matter, which could be put to use locally. Apparently the dumping ground never was expanded, but it seems that in the 1940s the amount of the waste accumulated became so great that the site could no longer be used in the original manner.

== The site today ==
Hiidenkivi Park is at the site. No signs of the former dumping ground remain.
