= Puistola railway station =

Railway station in Helsinki, Finland

Puistola Parkstad
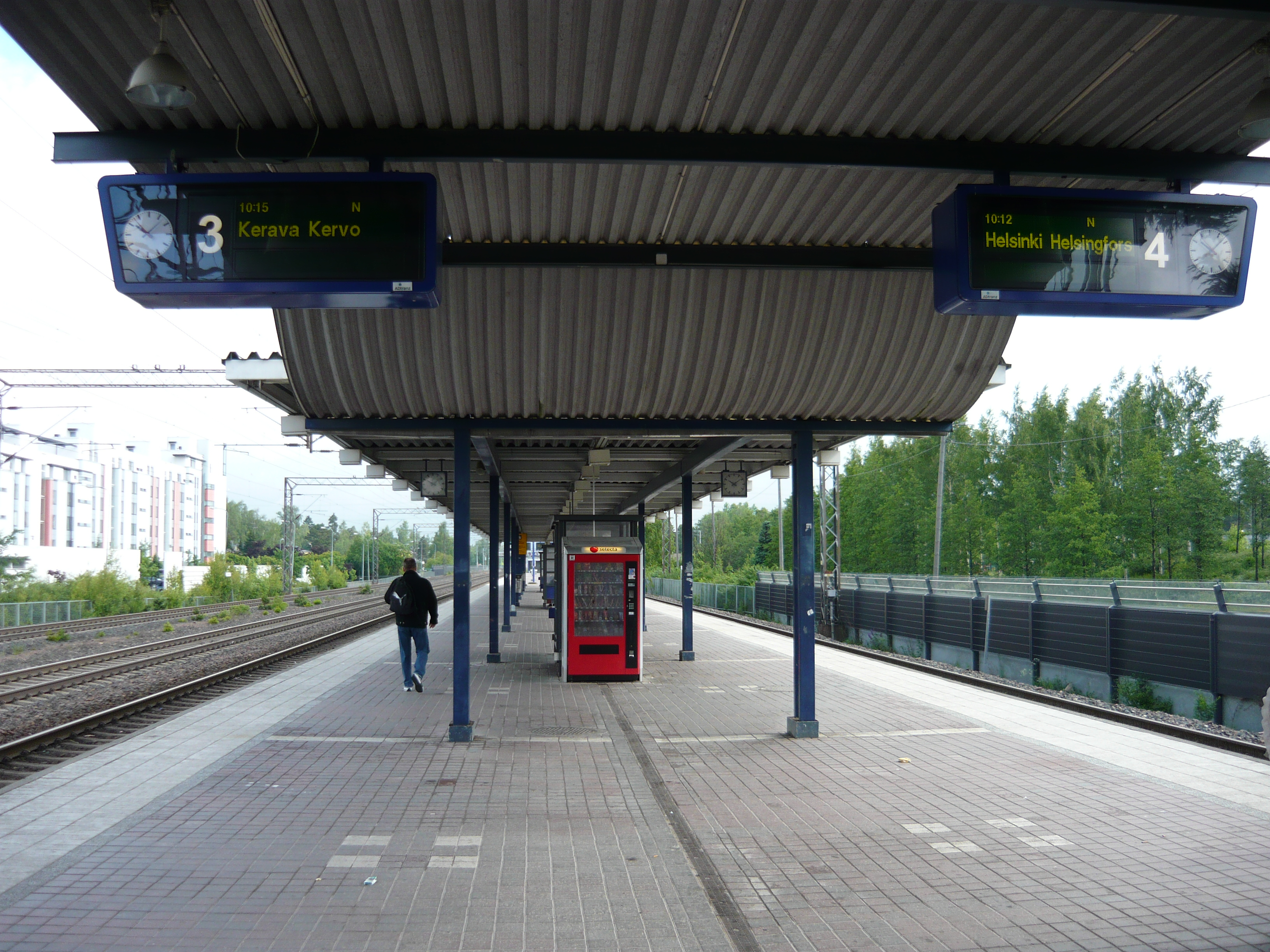

General information
- Coordinates: 60°16′27″N 25°2′8.5″E
- System: Helsinki commuter rail station
- Owner: Finnish Transport Agency
- Lines: I, K, P, T
- Platforms: 1
- Connections: bus lines 73/N, 74/N, 75, 79/N, 705

Construction
- Structure type: ground station
- Accessible: 2

Other information
- Fare zone: B

History
- Opened: 1910

Passengers
- 2019: 3,089,456

Services
Preceding station	Helsinki commuter rail	Following station
Tapanila One-way operation	I counterclockwise via Tikkurila	Tikkurila towards Helsinki via Airport
Tikkurila One-way operation	P clockwise via Myyrmäki	Tapanila towards Helsinki
Tapanila towards Helsinki	K	Tikkurila towards Kerava
Preceding station	VR commuter rail	Following station
Tapanila towards Helsinki	T	Tikkurila towards Riihimäki
Location
- Location within Helsinki (mainland)

Puistola (Finnish) or Parkstad (Swedish) is a railway station in the Tapulikaupunki district of Helsinki, Finland. It is located between the stations of Tapanila and Tikkurila, along the main railroad track from Helsinki to Riihimäki, about 14 kilometres northeast from the Helsinki Central railway station.

== History ==
Puistola railway station was opened in 1910, originally named Fastböle. A small waiting room was built at the station in 1913, but was already replaced by a new station building designed by architect Thure Hellström in 1924. The station building remained in use until 1978, when the station was moved further south, after which a new ticket sales office and a waiting room connected to the underpass tunnel was opened. The ticket sales office was closed in 2000. The former station building was demolished in 2001.

== Departure tracks ==
Puistola has two platform tracks for passenger trains (3, 4). Track 1 has a short platform that is unused by the passenger trains that stop at the station and is no longer accessible.

- Track 3 is used by I trains to the Helsinki Airport as well as K and T trains towards Kerava.
- Track 4 is used by P, K and T trains to Helsinki.
