= Tapulikaupunki =

Coordinates: 60°16′30″N 25°02′00″E

Tapulikaupunki Stapelstaden
- Helsinki Subdivision
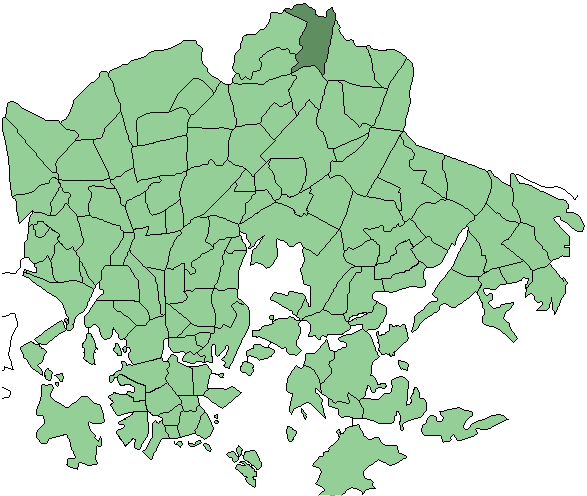
- Position of Tapulikaupunki within Helsinki
- Country: Finland
- Region: Uusimaa
- Sub-region: Greater Helsinki
- Municipality: Helsinki
- District: Northeastern
- Area: 220 km^{2} (85 sq mi)
- Population (1 January 2005): 8,582
  - Density: 3,901/km^{2} (10,100/sq mi)
- Postal codes: 00730, 00740, 00750
- Subdivision number: 402
- Neighbouring subdivisions: Puistola, Tapaninkylä, Töyrynummi, Siltamäki, Tapanila

Tapulikaupunki (Finnish), Stapelstaden (Swedish) is a northern neighborhood of Helsinki, Finland.

Tapulikaupunki is located on the Main Line next to Puistola station. The subarea of Puistola in the district Suursuo is located on the opposite side of the railroad. Lower Tikkurila is a subarea of Tapulikaupunki.

Tapulikaupunki is built on the land that belonged to an agricultural research station from 1925 to 1960. When operations ceased began planning what to do with the muddy fields. In the 1970s, a high-rise district with square concrete houses was scheduled high and tight. The designated car parking separated from the houses was a new innovation that enabled the creation of pedestrian areas.

The area was first called the high-rise area of Puistola station, but residents quickly began calling area Tapulikaupunki after a road named Tapulikaupungintie that passed through the district. In the 1970s, the name Tapulikaupunki became official.

Most of the buildings are from the 1970s and early 1980s. In the 1990s, a new townhouse and apartment block area were built. In the 2000s, modern high-rises along the railway were built.

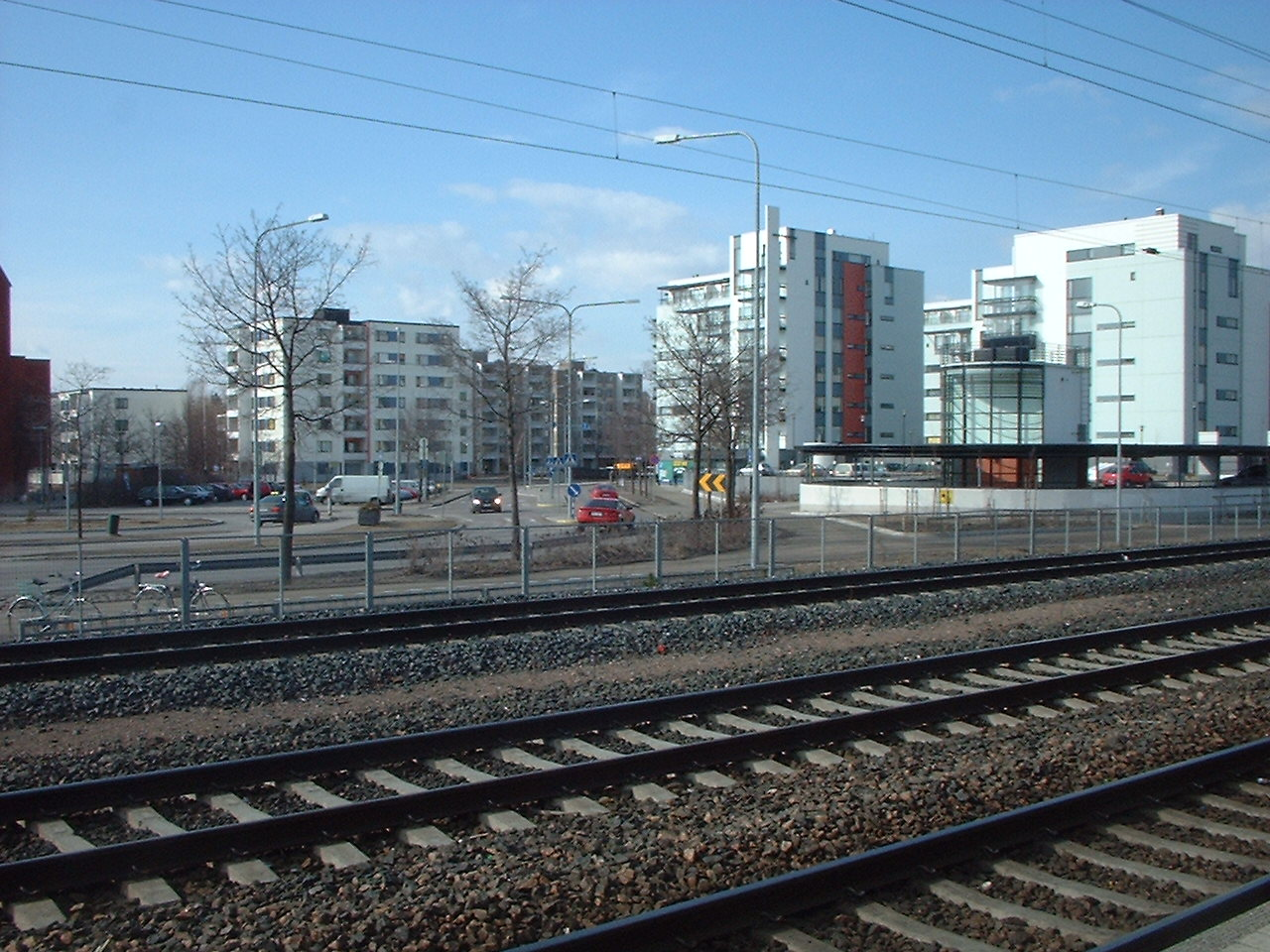
Buildings around the station.
