= Puistola =

Puistola (in Finnish) Parkstad (in Swedish)
- Neighborhood of Helsinki
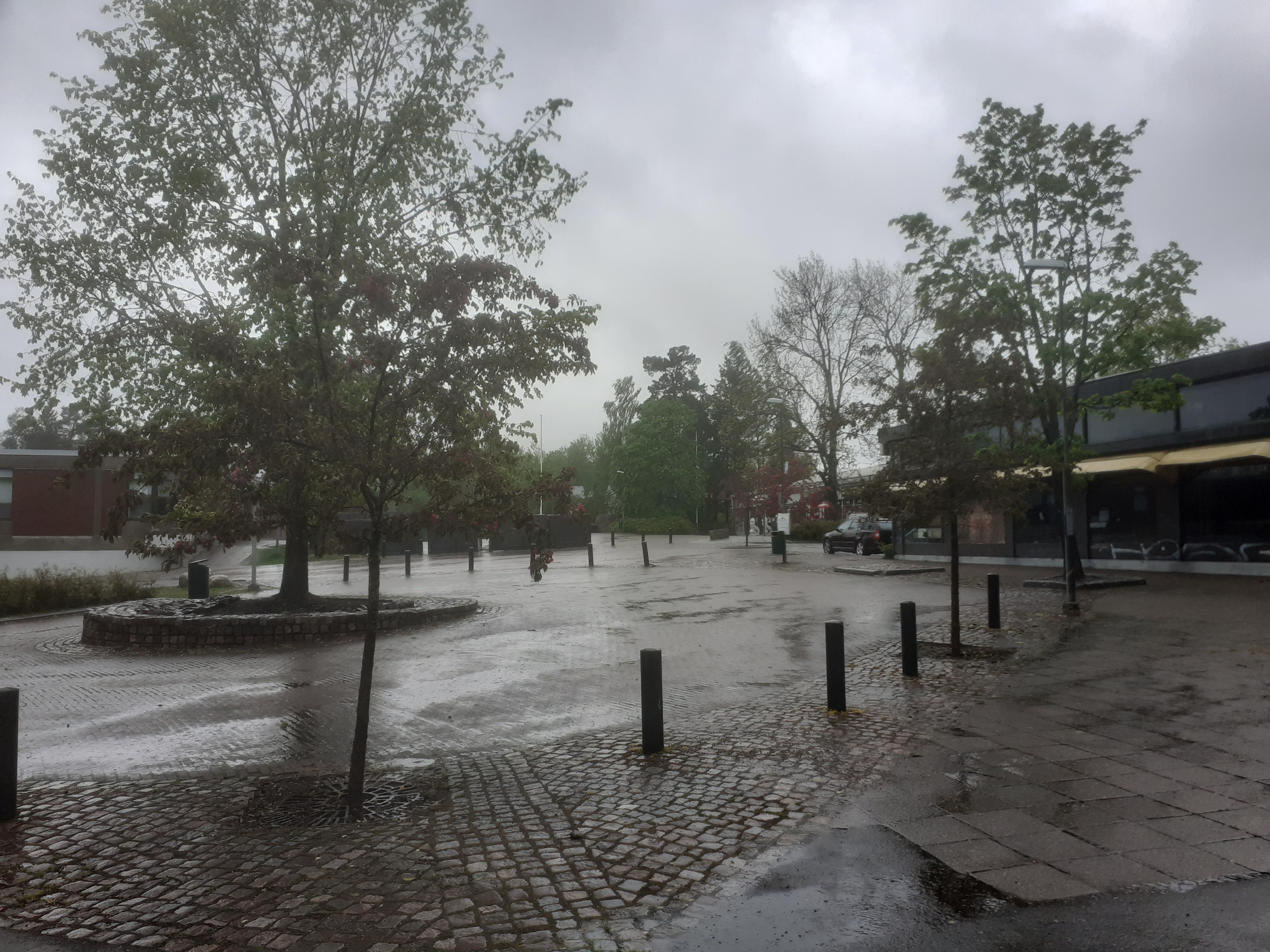
- Puistola square (Puistolantori)

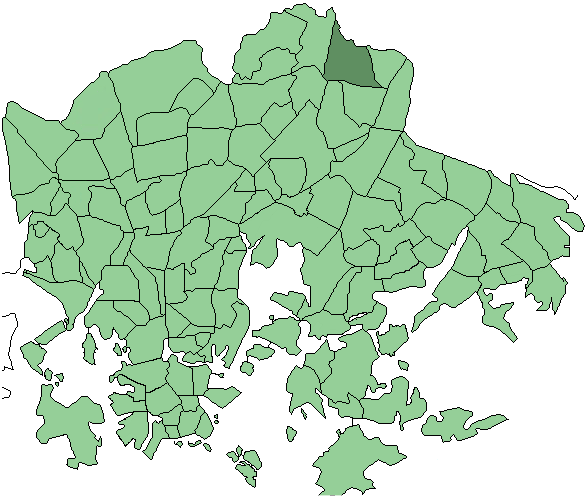
- Location in Helsinki
- Coordinates: 60.27244°N 25.04522°E
- Country: Finland
- Province: Southern Finland
- Region: Uusimaa
- Sub-region: Helsinki
- Time zone: UTC+2 (EET)
  - Summer (DST): UTC+3 (EEST)

Puistola (Swedish: Parkstad; literally means "park town") is a neighborhood in the northeastern part of Helsinki, Finland. It is located along the main railway (Helsinki–Hämeenlinna railway) about two kilometers south of Tikkurila (Vantaa) and about six kilometers north of Malmi (Helsinki). Puistola was previously also considered a field area on the west side of the main railway, but after its construction it was named Tapulikaupunki and classified as belonging to the Suutarila district.

Between Puistola and Tapulikaupunki, along the main railway, is the Puistola railway station.
