= Tapaninkylä =

Tapaninkylä (in Finnish) Staffansby (in Swedish)
- Subdistrict of Helsinki
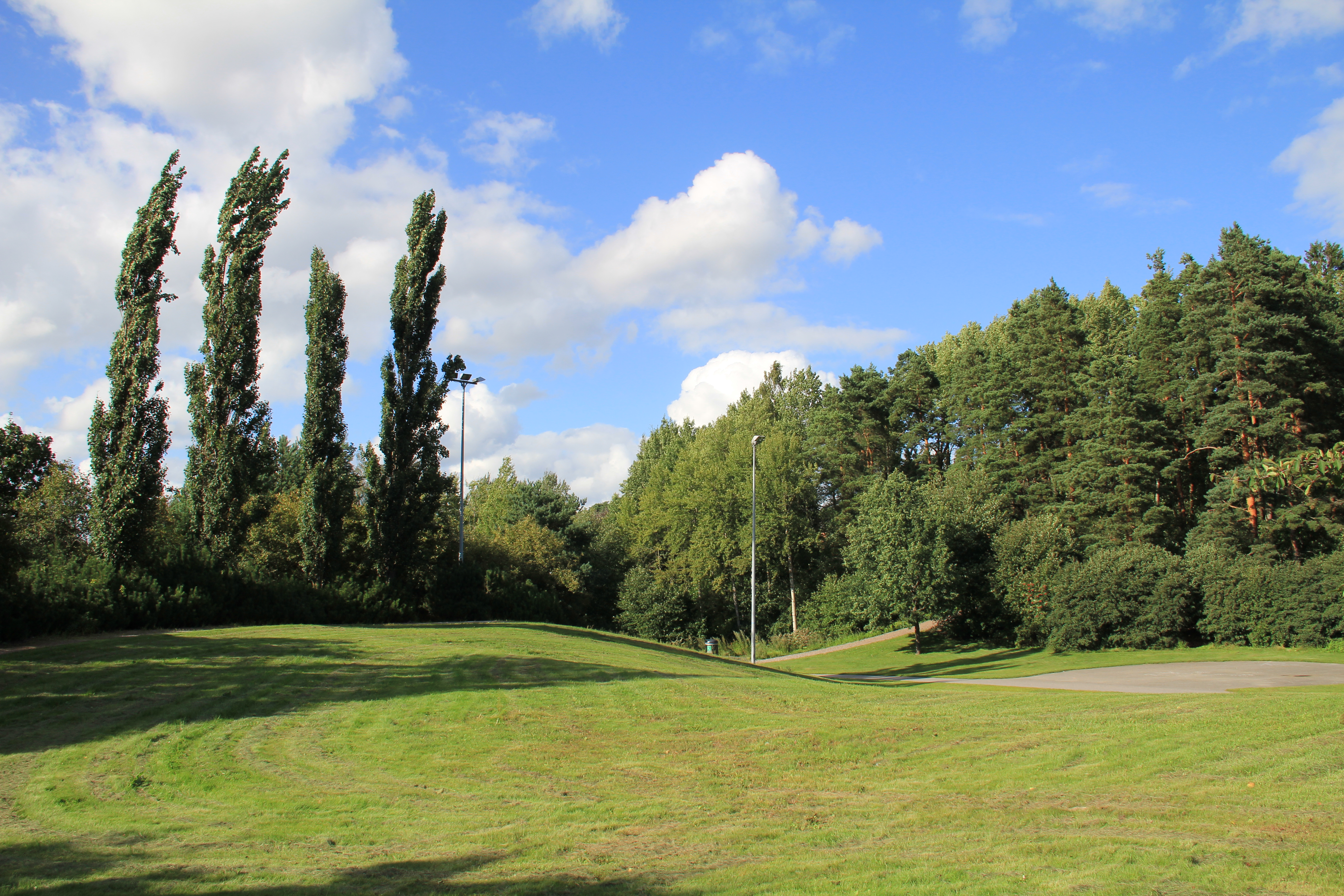
- Hiidenkivi park, Tapanila, Helsinki, Finland
- Interactive map of Tapaninkylä (in Finnish); Staffansby (in Swedish)
- Coordinates: 60.263266°N 25.011332°E
- Country: Finland
- Province: Southern Finland
- Region: Uusimaa
- Sub-region: Helsinki
- Time zone: UTC+2 (EET)
  - Summer (DST): UTC+3 (EEST)

Tapaninkylä (Finnish), Staffansby (Swedish) is a subdistrict of Helsinki, Finland.

Tapaninkylä dumping ground was located there from 1903 to 1944. It was later developed into Hiidenkivi Park.
