= Terveystalo =

Finnish Private Healthcare Company

Terveystalo (literally "health-house") is a Finnish private healthcare company. Terveystalo provides healthcare, work healthcare and hospital care services for private persons, corporations, insurance companies and the public sector in about 100 localities with about 180 locations all over Finland.

== History ==
The history of Terveystalo dates back to the 1940s, when the oldest daughter companies of the group were founded. Terveystalo started activities in 2001 when the group was joined by Vaajakosen Lääkäriasema Oy and the Medipa Oy medical stations in Alajärvi, Kauhava and Härmä. The company grew significantly from 2002 to 2007 when over a hundred corporate and business deals were made, and the company has continued to grow. The growth was partially influenced by the company being listed on Nasdaq Helsinki in early 2007.

The largest business deal was made in June 2007 when Suomen Terveystalo Oyj acquired Medivire Työterveyspalvelut Oyj founded in 1995 for 127 million euro. After the deal Suomen Terveystalo Oyj became Finland's largest private healthcare company. In December 2007 Medivire Työterveyspalvelut Oy was renamed Suomen Terveystalo Työterveyspalvelut Oy, and Medivire Työterveyspalvelut was kept as an auxiliary name.

=== From capital investors back to the stock market ===
The British capital investment company Bridgepoint Group and its daughter company Star Healthcare made an acquisition offer of Terveystalo on 19 January 2009. Terveystalo Healthcare's listing on Nasdaq Helsinki ended on 25 August 2009 after Star Healthcare had bought the entire company out of the stock market. In early summer 2009 Star Healthcare owned about 97.9% of the company's stock and in August it acquired also the remaining shares. In September 2013 the Bridgepoint Group sold Terveystalo to the Swedish EQT VI fund owned by the Wallenberg family.

During its history Terveystalo has significantly expanded through corporate acquisitions. In EQT's ownership Terveystalo expanded its activities to dental care and mouth healthcare in summer 2015, and in late 2017 the dentist network of the concern reached to 20 localities. In November 2016 the Helsinki Deaconess Institute foundation made a deal to fuse the Diacor healthcare company to Terveystalo in spring 2017. This made the Helsinki Deaconess Institute one of the largest owners of Terveystalo.

In September 2017 Terveystalo announced it would return to Nasdaq Helsinki. At this time, Varma, Hartwall Capital, Rettig Group and the Elo insurance company registered as its anchor investors. The stock release at the time of the listing was overmarked by a manifold and trading the company stock started on the stock market's main list on 13 October 2017. In May 2018 EQT AB announced it would relinquish ownership of Terveystalo.

In May 2018 Terveystalo announced it would acquire the healthcare servies of its rival Attendo in Finland, which made Terveystalo the largest private healthcare company in Finland by far.

Terveystalo's CEO Yrjö Närhinen resigned in May 2019. In August 2019 Ville Iho was named Närhinen's successor as CEO and he started at the post on 6 December 2019.

In June 2021 Terveystalo announced it would acquire the Swedish company Feelgood.

== Services ==
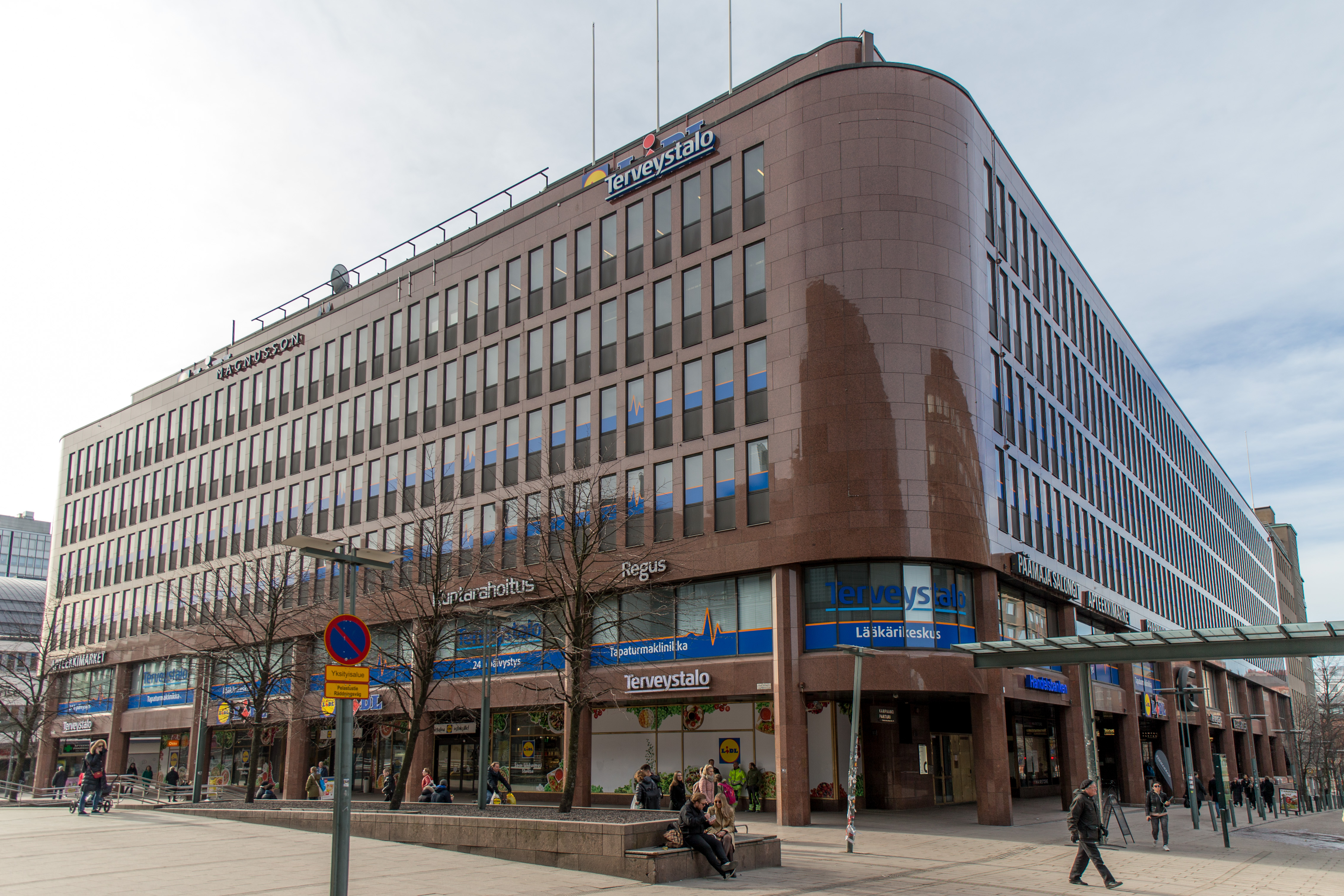
A Terveystalo healthcare location in Kamppi, Helsinki.

The Terveystalo concern provides services in general medicine, work healthcare and special hospital care, diagnostics, daytime surgery, mouth healthcare and other complementary healthcare for private and corporate customers and customers in the public sector. According to the Terveystalo concern it had about 663 thousand work healthcare customers in Finland in 2018. The nationwide network included about 180 locations at about 100 localities.

The Association for Finnish Work awarded the Avainlippu award to Terveystalo in 2018 for providing services produced in Finland employing Finnish people.

== Economy ==
Economical figures about Terveystalo:

	2013	2014	2015	2016	2017	2018
Number of employees	3 200	3 100	3 400	3 463	4 265	6 018
Revenue (millions of euro)	312	305	325	473	690	745
