= Tikkurila railway station =

Railway station in Vantaa, Finland

Tikkurila Dickursby
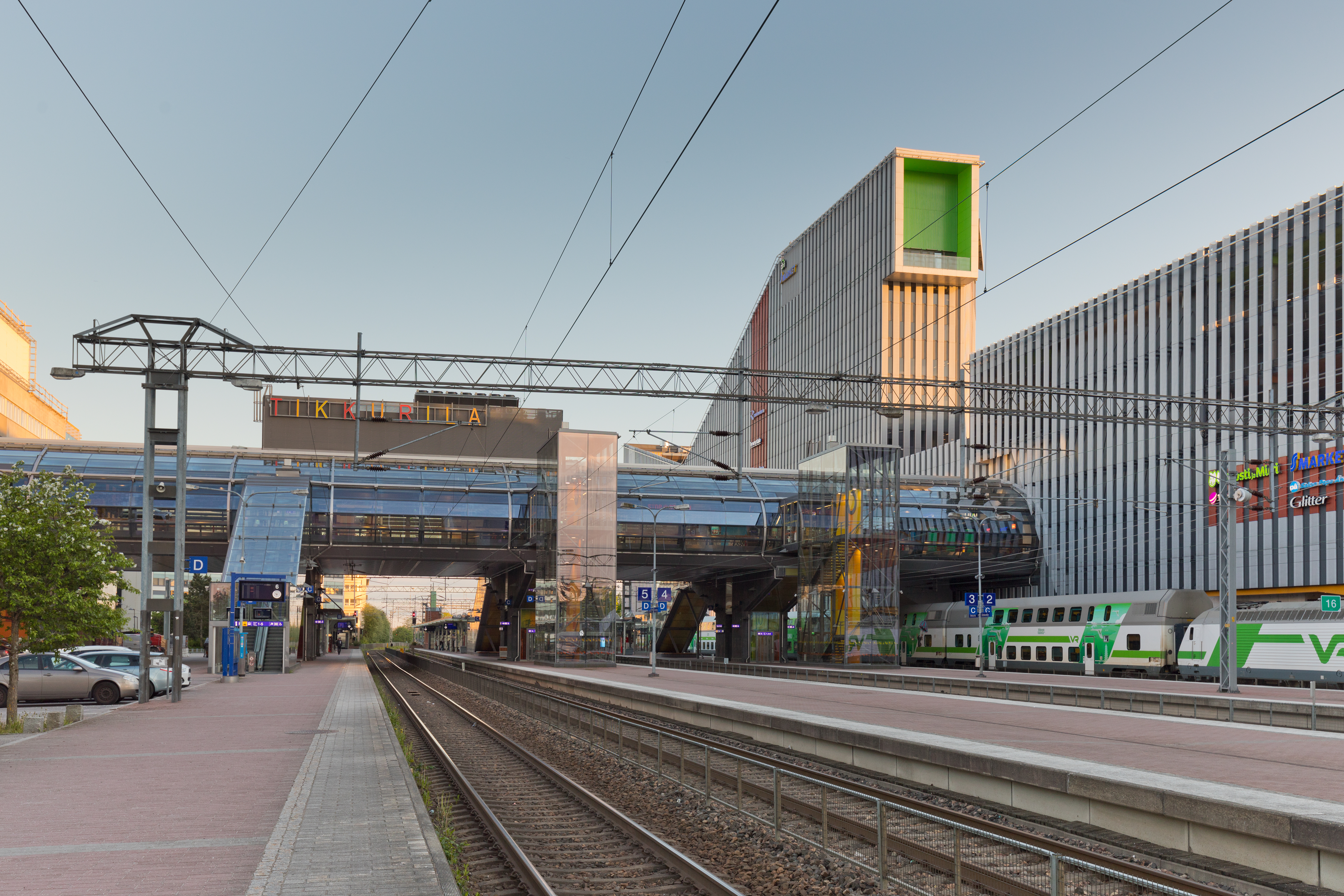
- Tikkurila railway station

General information
- Location: Ratatie 11; Vantaa, Uusimaa; Finland
- Coordinates: 60°17′38″N 25°2′42″E
- System: VR station
- Owner: Finnish Transport Agency
- Line: Helsinki–Riihimäki railway
- Platforms: 2 island platforms 2 side platforms
- Tracks: 6
- Connections: Helsinki buses

Construction
- Accessible: 2

Other information
- Station code: Tkl
- IATA code: HVT
- Fare zone: C
- Classification: Part of split operating point (Tikkurila)

History
- Opened: 1862; 164 years ago

Passengers
- 2019: 10,063,798 (Helsinki commuter)
Services
Preceding station	Helsinki commuter rail	Following station
Hiekkaharju One-way operation	P clockwise via Myyrmäki	Puistola towards Helsinki
Puistola One-way operation	I counterclockwise via Tikkurila	Hiekkaharju towards Helsinki via Airport
Puistola towards Helsinki	K	Hiekkaharju towards Kerava
Preceding station	VR commuter rail	Following station
Puistola towards Helsinki	T	Hiekkaharju towards Riihimäki
Pasila towards Helsinki	R	Kerava towards Riihimäki or Tampere
Pasila towards Helsinki	Z	Kerava towards Lahti or Kouvola
Preceding station	VR Group	Following station
Pasila towards Helsinki	Helsinki–Riihimäki	Riihimäki Terminus
Pasila towards Helsinki	Helsinki–Riihimäki	through to Lahti
Pasila towards Helsinki	Helsinki–Kemijärvi (overnight service)	Riihimäki towards Kemijärvi
Pasila towards Helsinki	Helsinki–Kolari (overnight service)	Riihimäki towards Kolari
Location

Tikkurila station (Finnish: Tikkurilan rautatieasema, Swedish: Dickursby station) (IATA: HVT) is located in Tikkurila, the administrative centre of Vantaa in the Helsinki metropolitan area. It is located approximately 16 kilometres (9.9 mi) from Helsinki Central railway station and 5 kilometres (3.1 mi) from Helsinki Airport. The station is considered the main railway station of Vantaa, and almost all long-distance and commuter trains stop here.

== History ==
Tikkurila was one of the first seven railway stations in Finland founded on the country's first railway between Helsinki and Hämeenlinna in 1862. Out of the intermediate stations, Tikkurila, Riihimäki and Turenki were supposed to be built out of brick, but eventually Tikkurila ended up being the only intermediate station to have a station building built out of brick. The Renaissance Revival style brick building designed by architect Carl Albert Edelfelt was completed in 1861.

As the railway station was opened, the population of Tikkurila started to grow. In 1865 the population was still 300 but by the turn of the century it had doubled. By 1950, the population was nearly 5,000 and two decades later it was already above 20,000.

A new station building was opened in 1978. The old station building from 1861 currently houses the Vantaa City Museum, opened in December 1990. The Finnish Heritage Agency has classified the former station building as a nationally significant built cultural environment.

On January 1, 2015, the new station/retail building Dixi was opened, replacing the previous station building from 1978.

== Connections ==
The station is a local transportation hub. Bus services include local neighbourhood service by a minibus and various connections inside Vantaa as well as regional services to Helsinki. Among the more important services running via Tikkurila station is the service 570, which connects the station to the Jumbo shopping centre, Aviapolis, and Flamingo in the west to Hakunila, Jakomäki and Mellunmäki (metro station) in the east on a 24-hour-basis. The 570 bus service will be replaced by the under-construction Vantaa light rail, which will cross under the station in a tunnel.

Since the completion of the Ring Rail Line the station has a frequent rail connection to Helsinki-Vantaa Airport some 5 km to the west of the station as well western parts of Vantaa with the northbound I-train service. All southbound services end at the Helsinki Central railway station.

== Departure tracks ==
There are six tracks at Tikkurila railway station all of which have a platform for passenger trains

- Track 1 is used by southbound long-distance trains and commuter trains D, R and Z to Helsinki.
- Tracks 2 and 3 are used by northbound long-distance trains towards Riihimäki and Lahti.
- Track 4 is used by commuter trains D and R to Riihimäki as well as Z to Lahti.
- Track 5 is used by commuter trains I to the Helsinki Airport as well as K and T towards Kerava.
- Track 6 is used by commuter trains P, K and T to Helsinki.

== Services ==
The station bridge and the Dixi centre offer a number of services to commuters, tourists and the public in general.

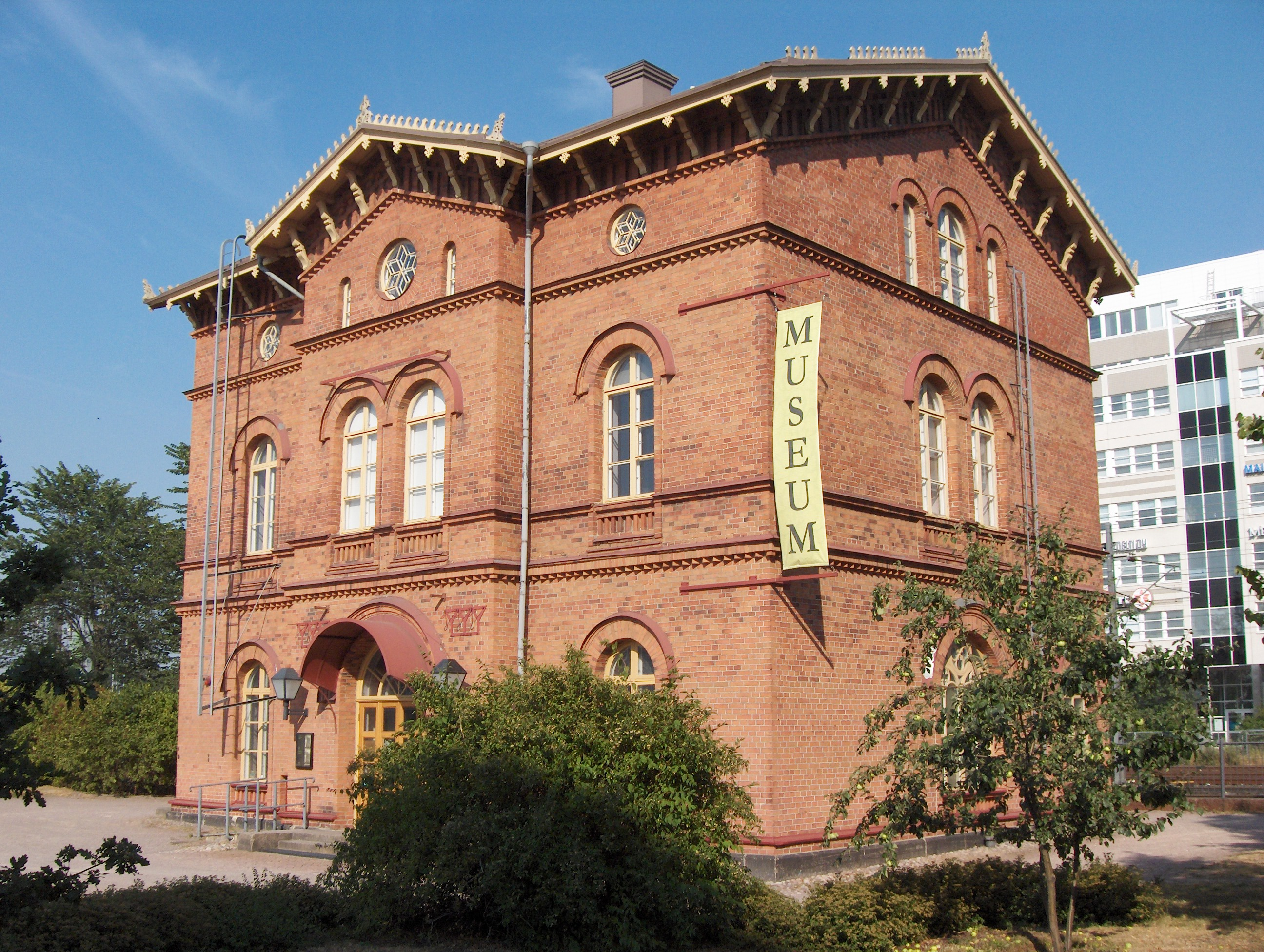
The very first station building from 1861 still exists today

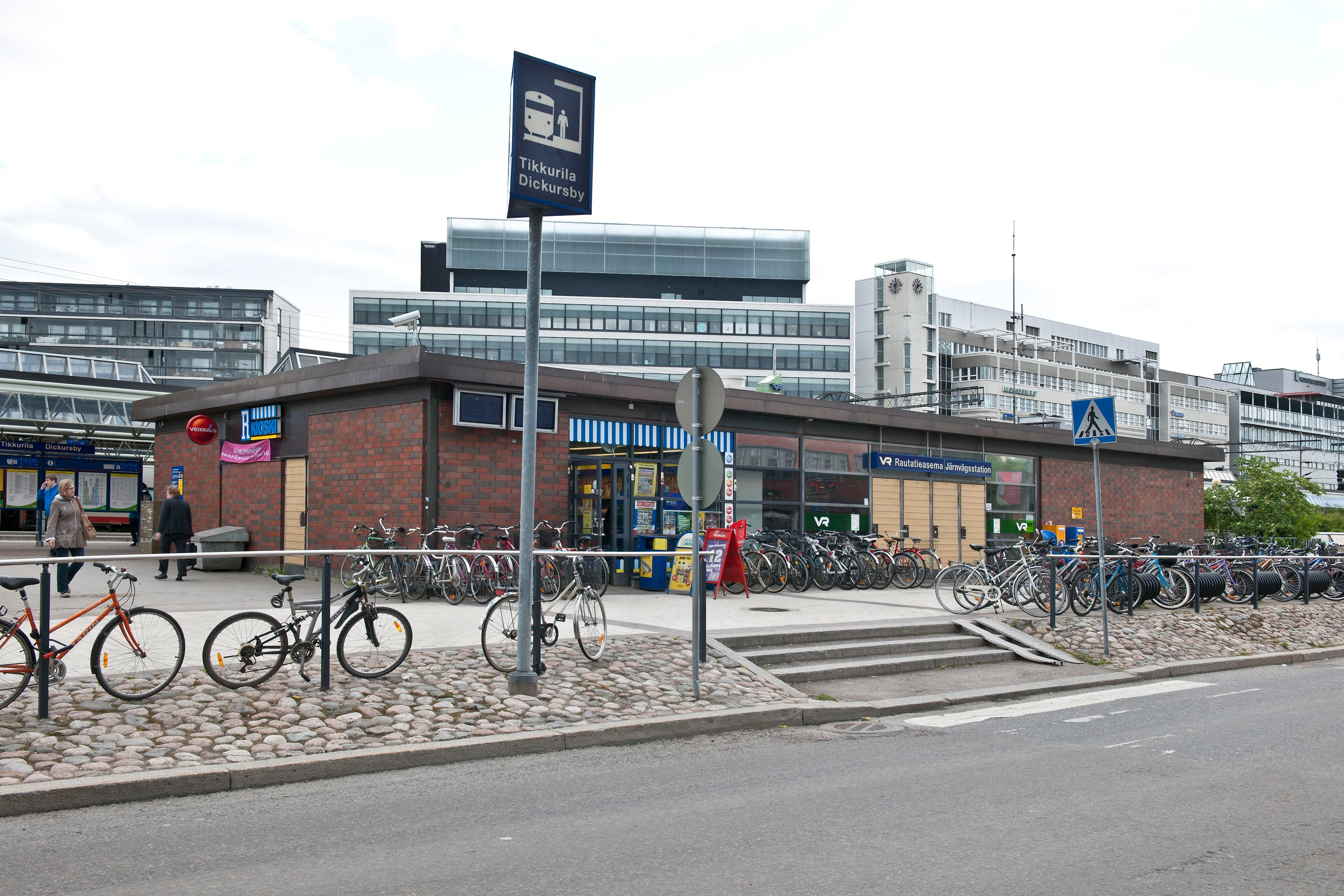
The newer station building before its demolition in 2015

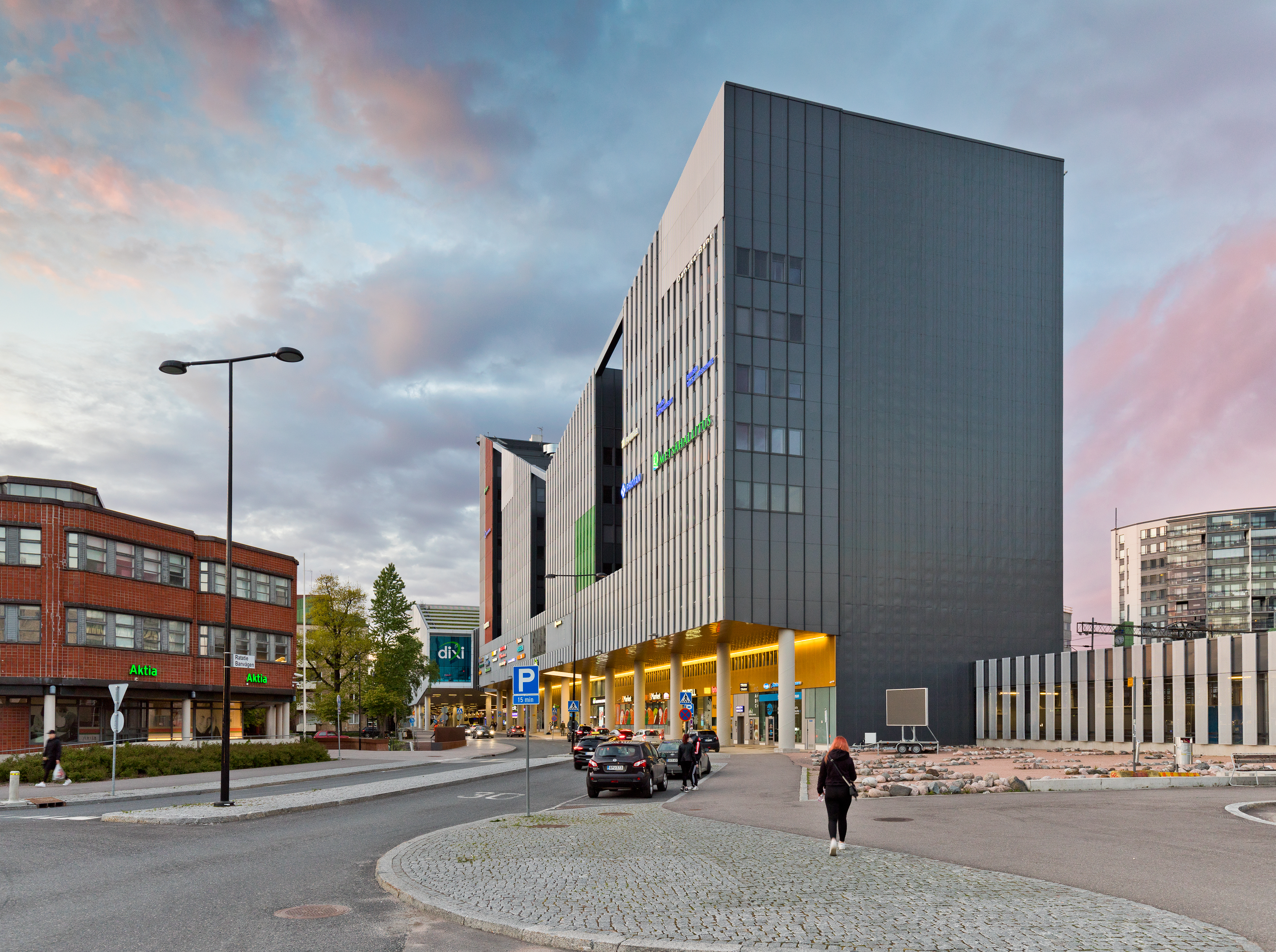
The station today with the notable Dixi centre

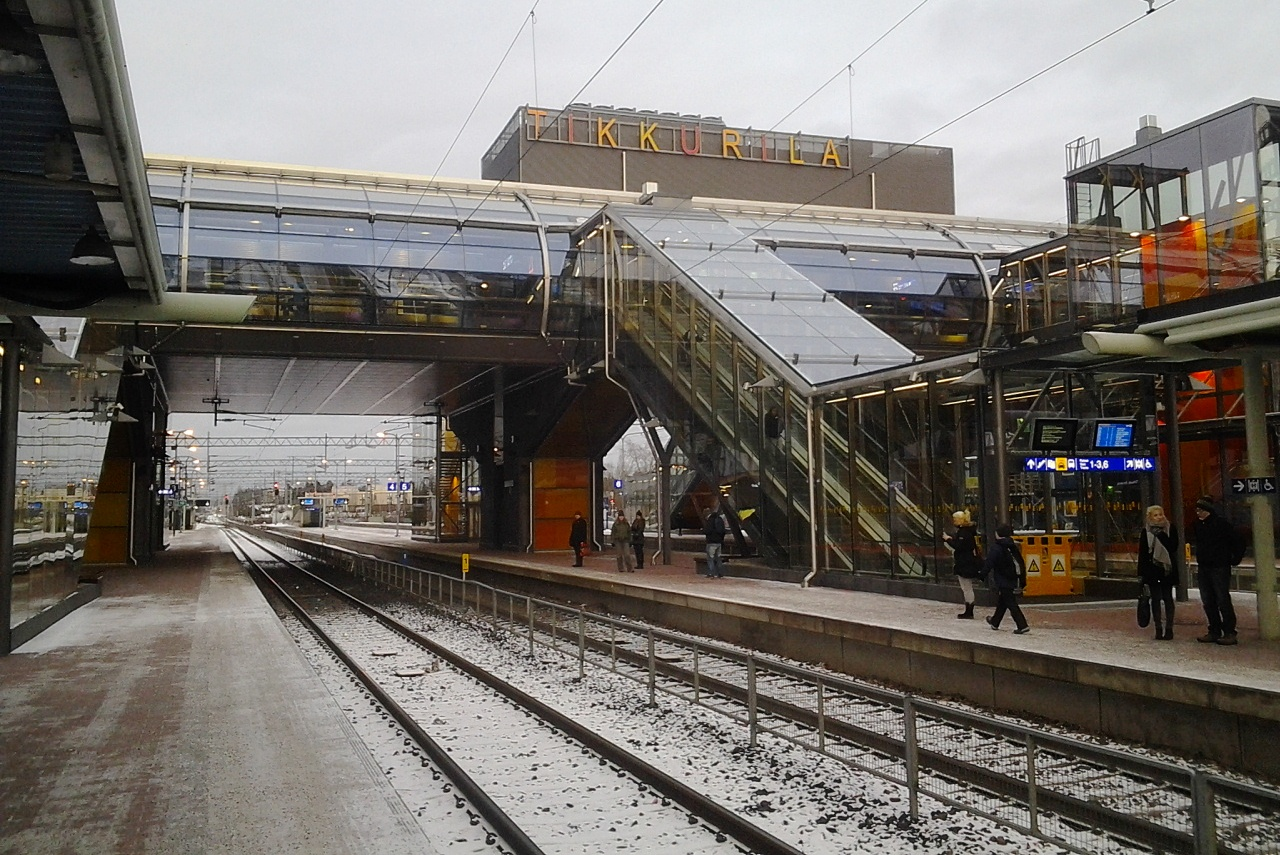
View of the new station from the south

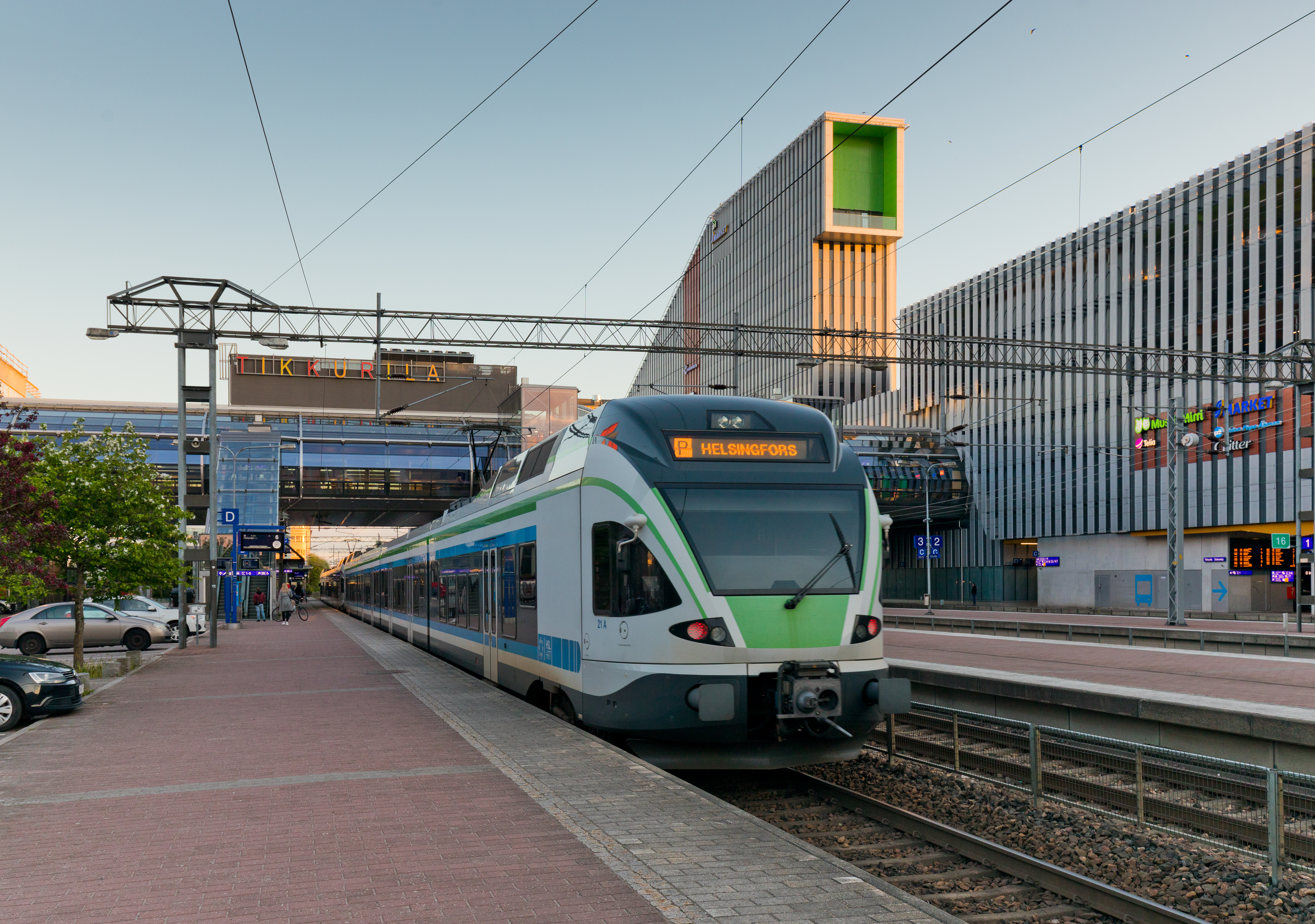
A Sm5 commuter train to Helsinki

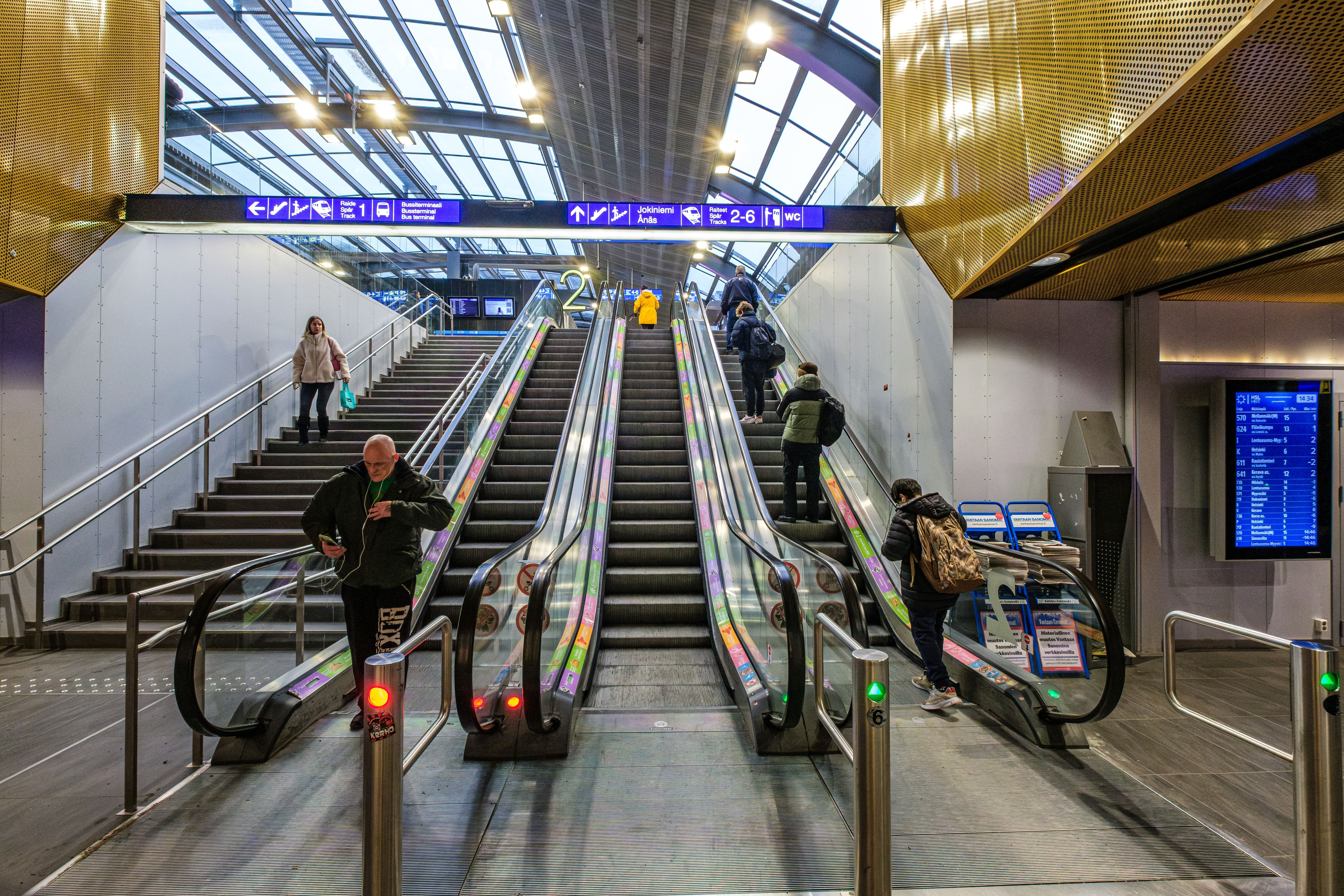
Station interior

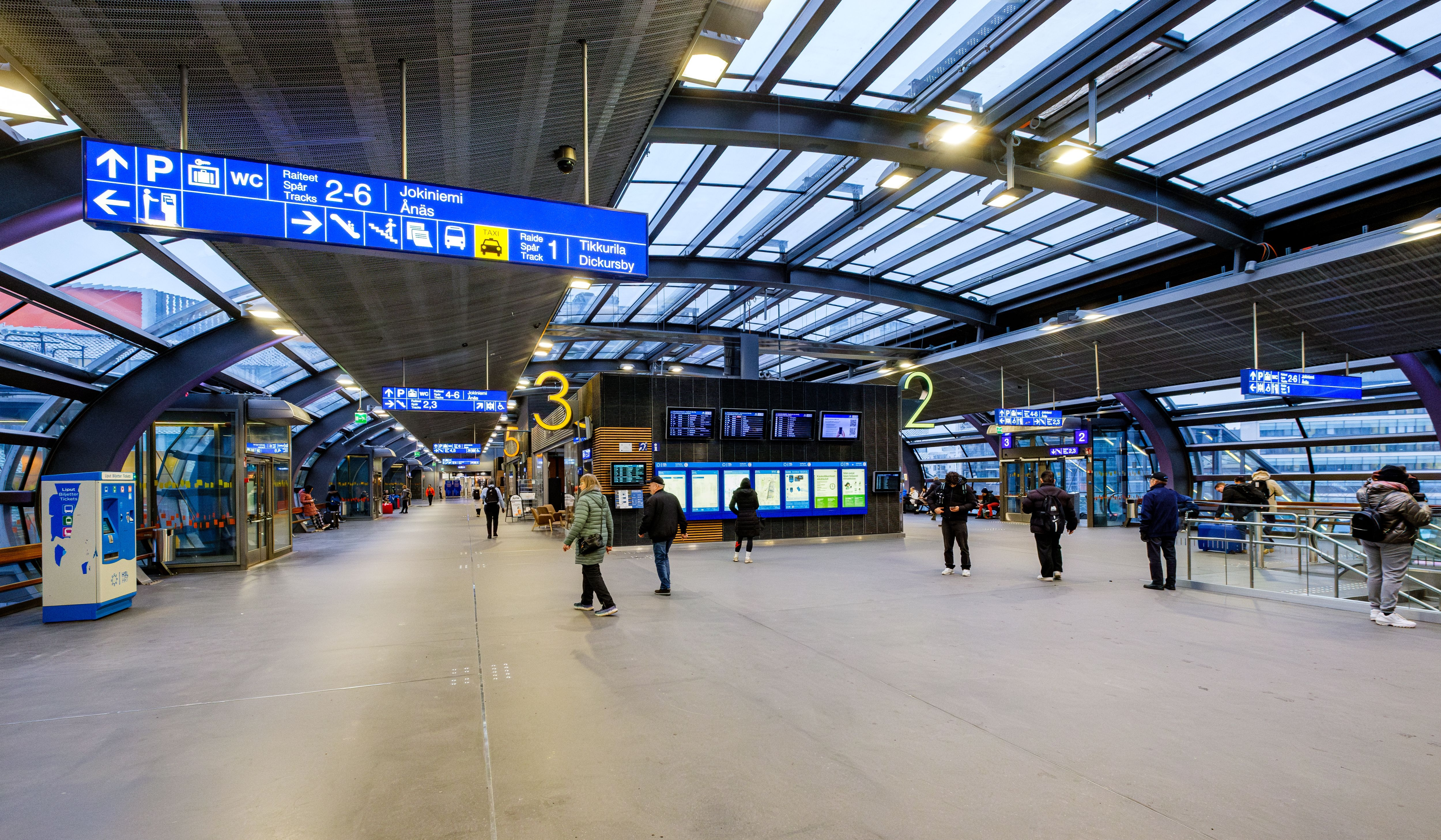
The station bridge

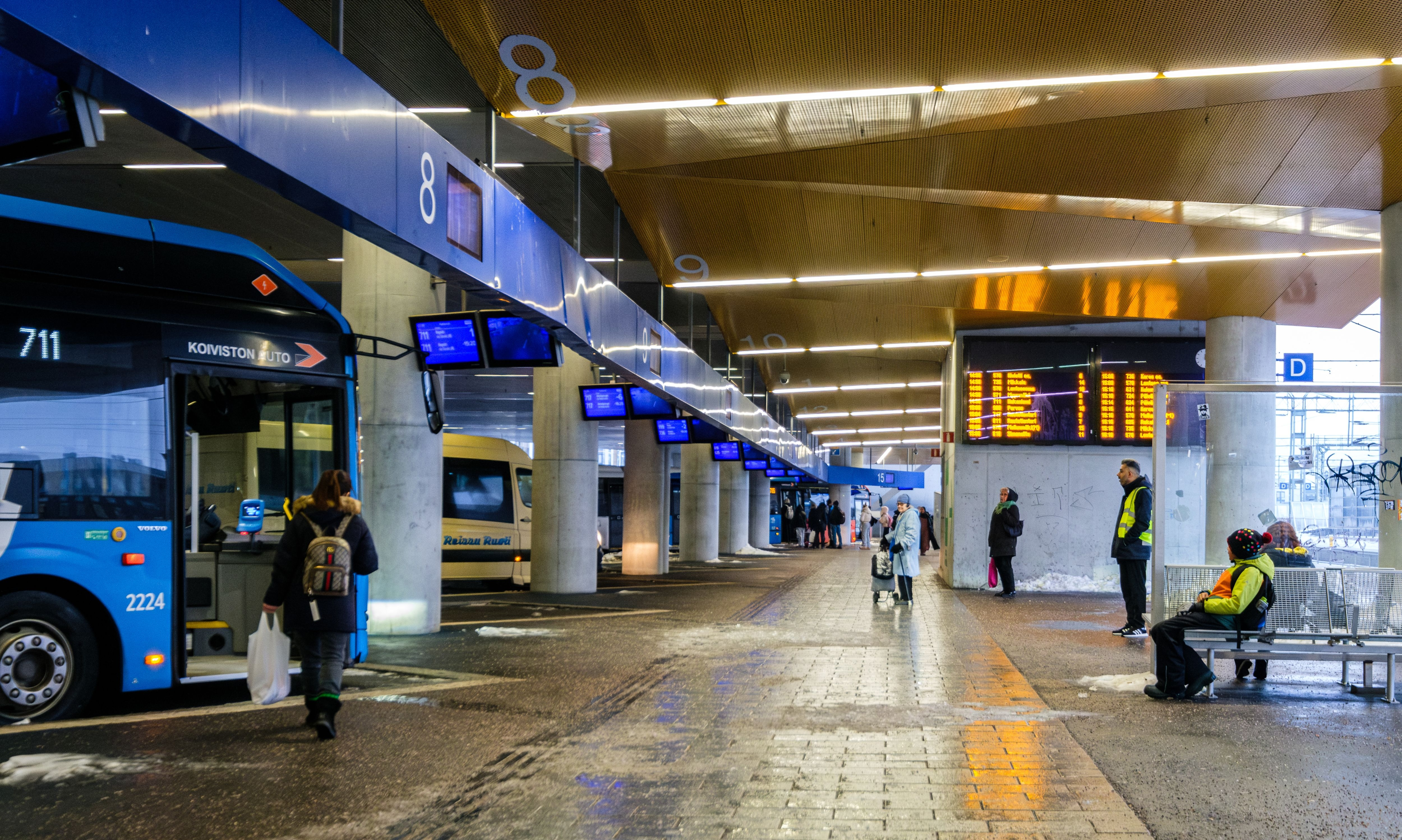
Bus terminal
