= Helsinki City Bikes =

Finnish bicycle sharing system

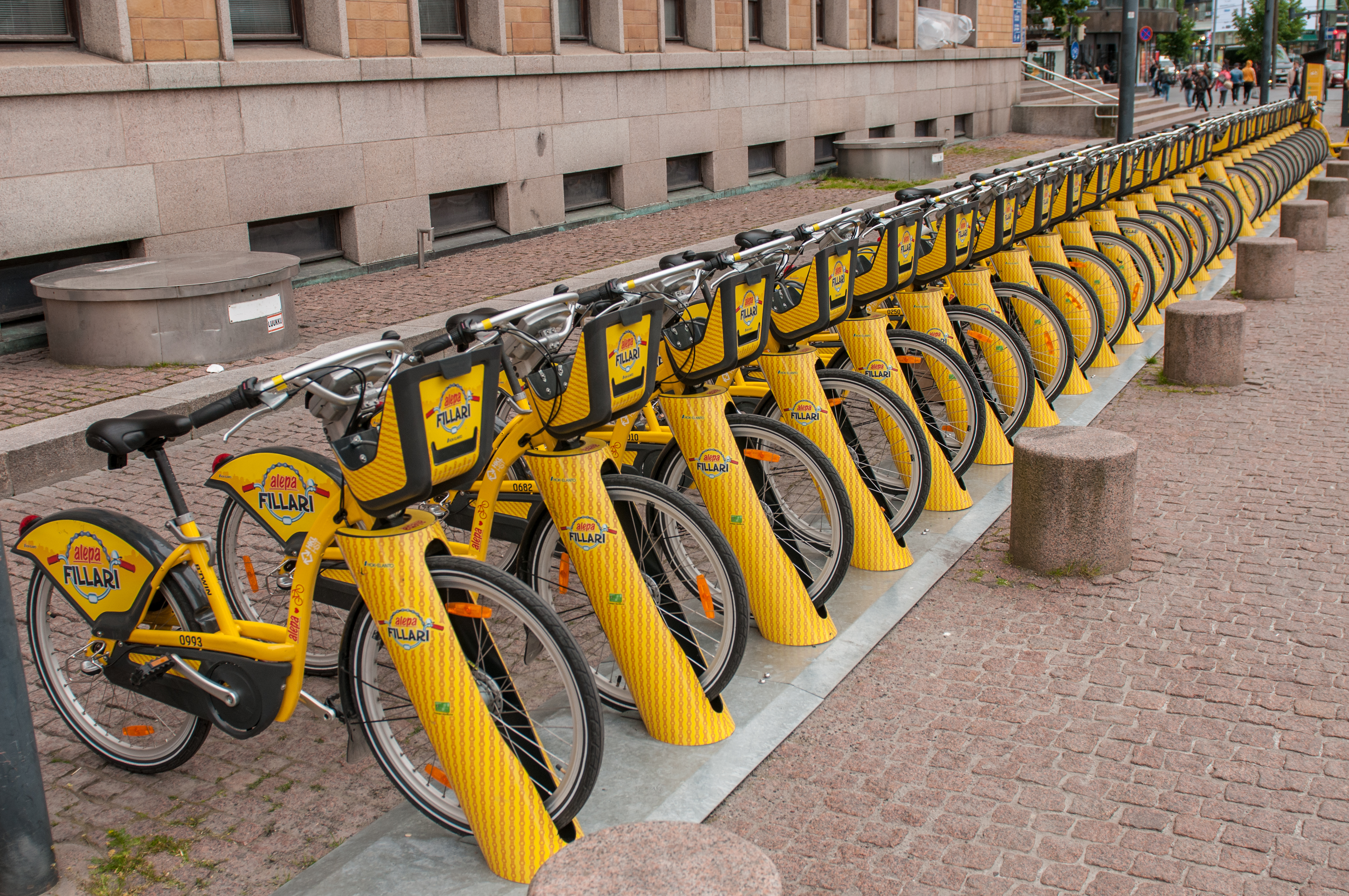
- Helsinki City Bikes at the street in 2017

Overview
- Owner: Helsinki City Transport
- Locale: Helsinki and Espoo, Finland
- Transit type: Bicycle sharing system
- Number of stations: 345
- Annual ridership: 3,218,800 (2018)
- Website: www.hsl.fi/en/citybikes/

Operation
- Began operation: May 2, 2016; 10 years ago
- Operator: Moventia
- Number of vehicles: 3450 bicycles

Helsinki City Bikes (Finnish: Kaupunkipyörät or Alepa-fillarit, Swedish: Stadscyklar) is a public bicycle system in Helsinki and Espoo and integrating with the rest of the public transport in Helsinki since May 2016. It is operated as a public-private partnership between Helsinki Regional Transport Authority (HSL), Helsinki City Transport (HKL), Espoo Technical and Environment Services, Moventia and Smoove.

== History ==
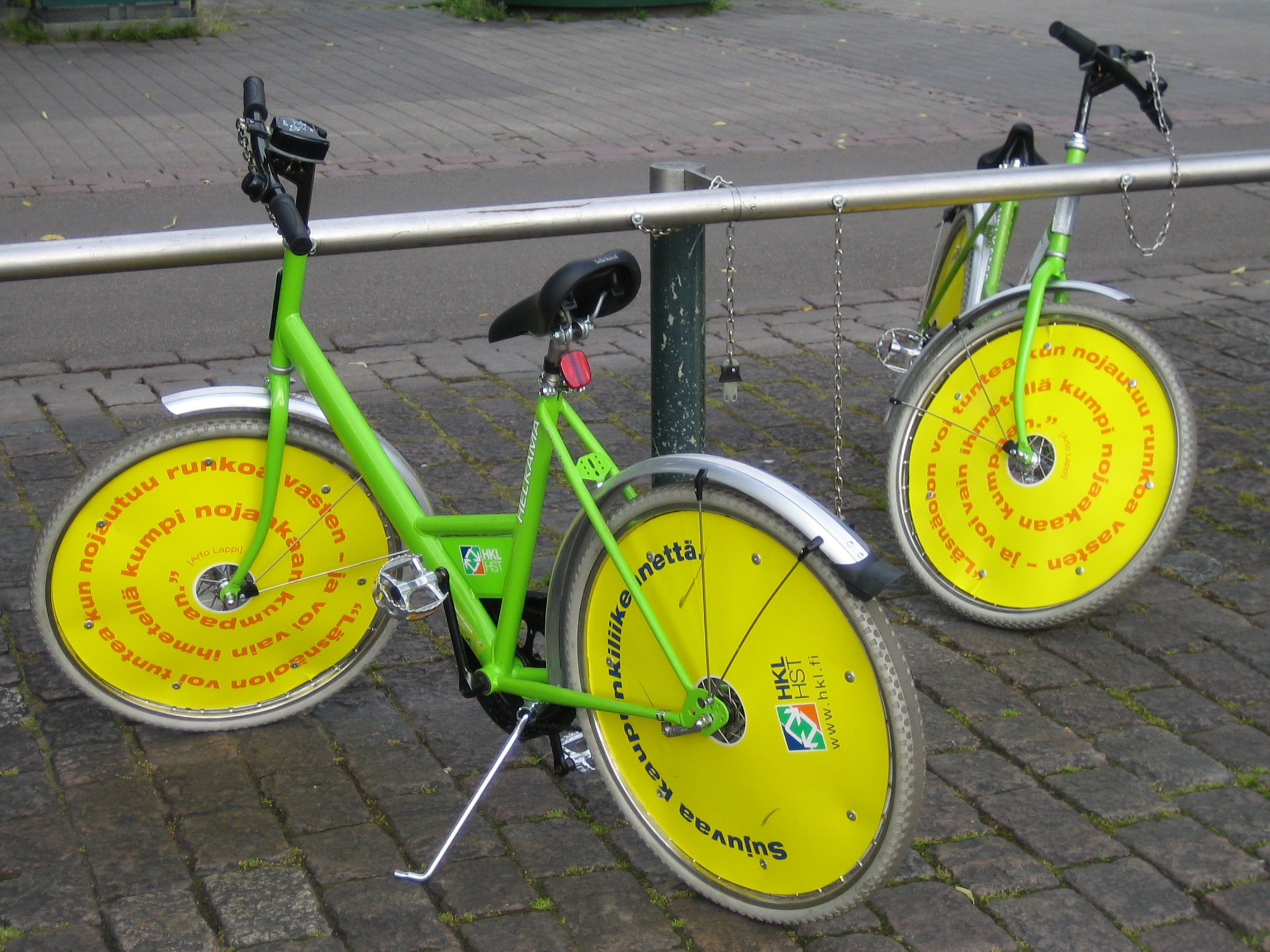
First generation (2000 - 2010) city bikes, 2005

The City of Helsinki had similar bike share program to Copenhagen City Bikes (also cancelled) from 2000 until 2010 when it was terminated in owing to funding issues and ongoing vandalism that required costly repairs and replacement of bicycles. Since the demise of first City Bikes, Helsinki City Transport was negotiating with JCDecaux Finland for a new bike share system. The system would have included 500 bikes and 34 stands in downtown Helsinki, modeled after the Paris Vélib' program, with part of the program costs to be paid by commercial businesses in exchange for 45 double-sided advertisement boards inside the city centre. However Helsinki could not agree places for advertisement boards and the deal was cancelled. In 2015 HKL made agreement with Moventia and Smoove about 2nd generation City Bikes and operation started in May 2016.

During the first week of operation, the bikes were used 15 000 times, which amounted to more than 6 rides per bike per day. In first three weeks 43 000 trips were made with the bikes and system had 6 000 registered users. During the first season when 500 bikes were in operation users rode over 740 000 kilometers.

After successful start Helsinki metropolitan area cities Espoo and Vantaa are considering joining the Helsinki bike sharing system. Autumn 2016 Espoo decided to start pilot trial with Helsinki bikes in summer 2017.

July 2017 system had 28 000 registered users for annual pass which is over double compared to 2016 season.

Helsinki ranked first in the study made in 2019 about the popularity of city bikes in different cities around the world. In the study, the Helsinki City Bikes System was compared with 50 cities around the world. Rate of use was used as a measure of popularity, i.e. the number of journeys made per bike per day.

== Hubs and bikes ==
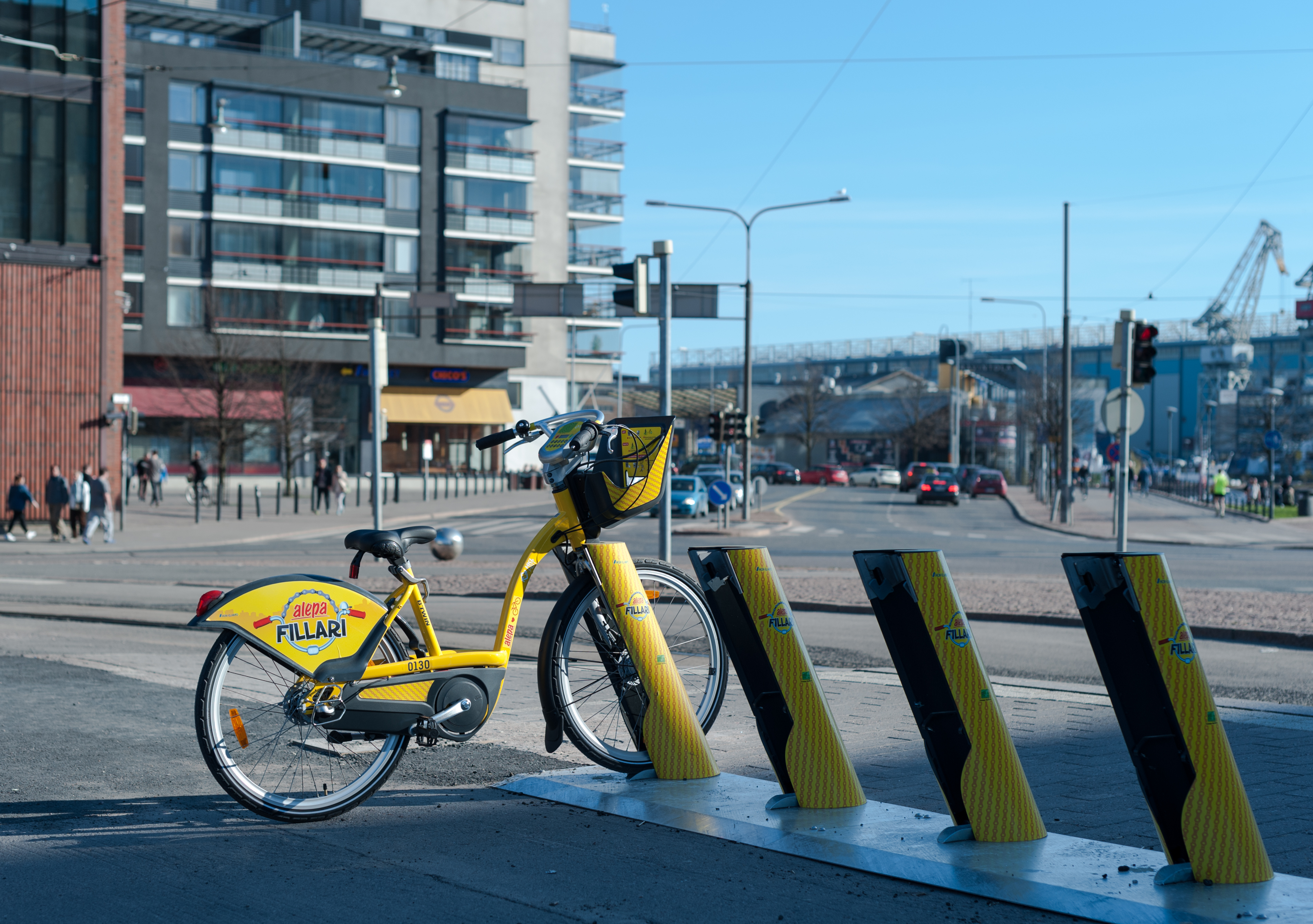
Helsinki City Bike in hub at Hietalahdentori, 2016

Helsinki's city bike system was opened in early May 2016 with 50 city bike stations (hubs) and 500 bikes serving the inner city area.

The system was expanded for the 2017 season to 150 hubs and 1500 bikes, covering Munkkiniemi, Pasila and Kumpula in addition to the inner city.

For the 2018 season the system was expanded to Espoo, having 70 stations from May and 35 more to be added during the summer. And had altogether 2550 city bikes.

== Rental system ==
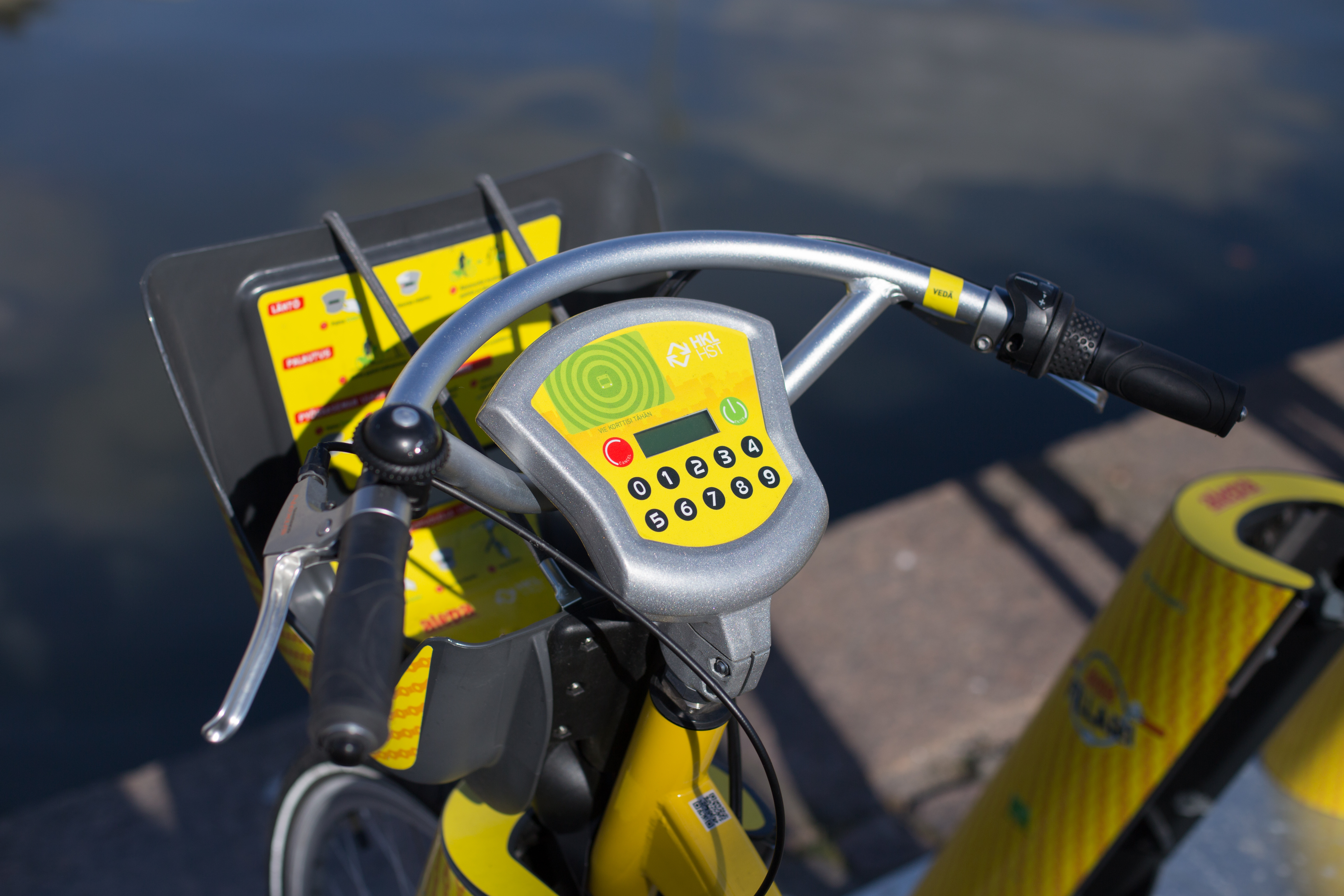
A bike control panel, with the RFID card reader (for Travel Card), 2016

The rental system is fully web-based. Unlike many other city bike systems, riders do not need to pick up a card to access the system. A rider can register for and pay for a daily, weekly or annual pass. The rider will be given a personal cyclist ID and a PIN code for unlocking a bike from any station. The locations of stations and information about bike availability can be accessed on HSL's Journey Planner. A HSL Travel Card can be used instead of a cyclist ID. The pass entitles the user to an unlimited number of rides of up to 30 minutes. Extra charges apply for longer journeys.

Bikes are available from April until 31 October, unlike many other public bicycle programs that are available throughout the year.

== Financing and management ==
The Helsinki city bike system is procured by Helsinki City Transport. The contract has been made for 10 years for a total value of 12 950 000 euros. The bikes and bike stations are supplied by Smoove, and Moventia is responsible for supplying the stations with bikes at even rates and for the upkeep of the bikes. Clear Channel Finland organizes project promotion and partnerships as a Moventia & Smoove subcontractor. Helsinki Cooperative Society Elanto’s (HOK-Elanto's) grocery store Alepa is the main cooperation partner of the city bike's and supports the system's implementation.

== Integration with public transport ==
City bikes form a part of the overall public transport travel chain in Helsinki. The city bike stations, the availability of bikes and route information are included in the revised Helsinki Region Transport (HSL) on-line journey planner. The inclusion of city bikes in the public transport routing system is unique by worldwide standards.

Locations of stations and information about bike availability is also available as Open data API.
