= Helsinki Metropolitan Area Council =

Logo

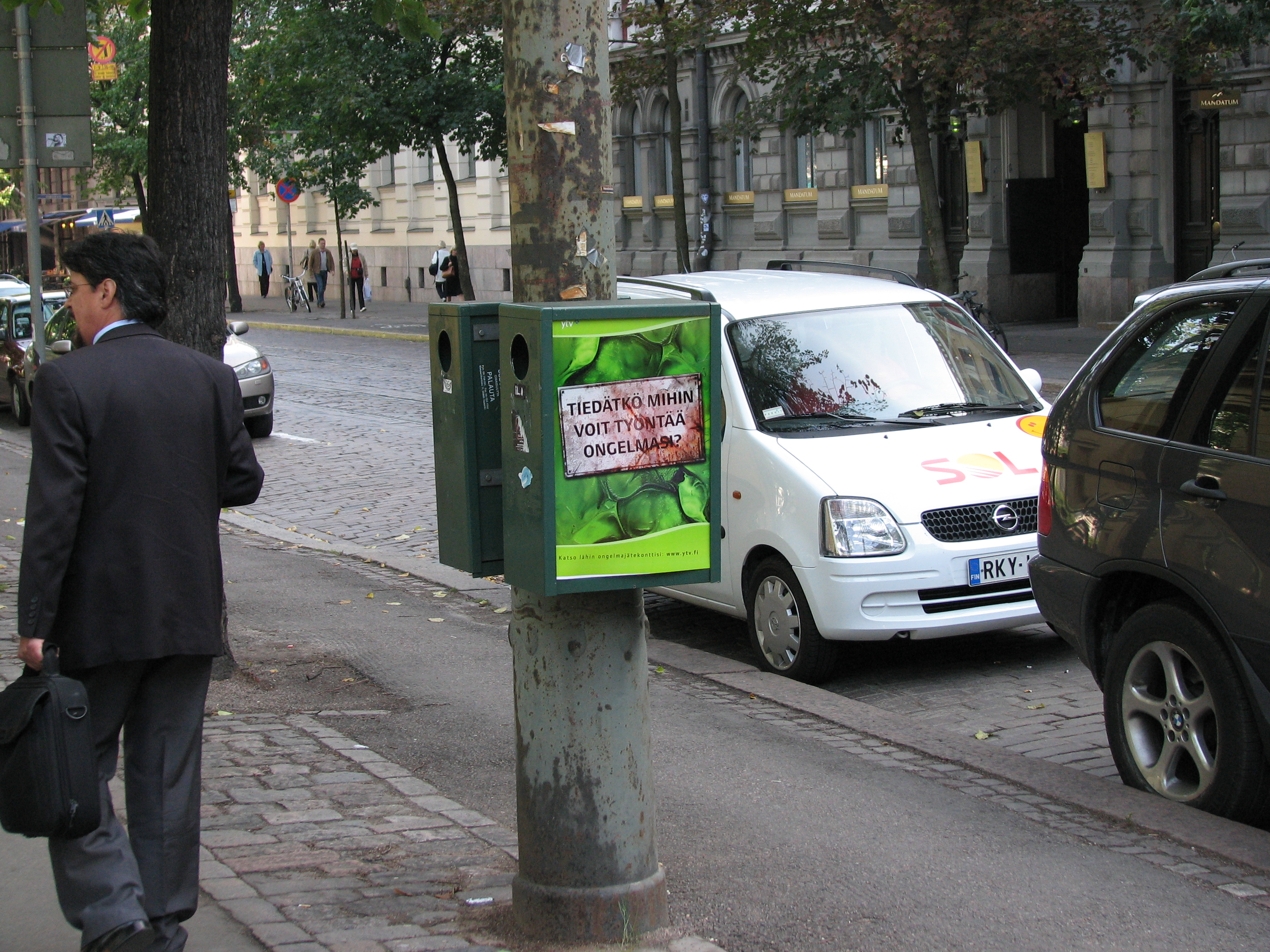
A street advertisement promoting YTV services

The Helsinki Metropolitan Area Council (Finnish: Pääkaupunkiseudun yhteistyövaltuuskunta, YTV, Swedish: Huvudstadsregionens samarbetsdelegation, SAD) was a co-operation agency operating in the Helsinki metropolitan area, now replaced by HSL and HSY. The organisation had a few responsibilities, most notably regional public transport and waste management. It was subordinated to the city councils of the four participating cities (Helsinki, Vantaa, Espoo and Kauniainen). Furthermore, transport cooperation also included neighboring municipalities of Kerava and Kirkkonummi.

== Transportation management ==
The Metropolitan Council grouped together different Public Transportation companies operating in the Metropolitan area, such as HKL, operator of the metro, Suomenlinna ferry service and bus services within the Helsinki region, and published a timetable of all public transport quarterly, and provided a public transport route planner service on the Internet. It also ran ticketing and prices, fixing prices at the same level for all public transportation, irrespective of method or transportation company. These services are now (since January 1, 2010) provided by Helsingin seudun liikenne.

Most tickets were bought using the electronic travel cards, a smart card service run by Buscom. These travel cards supported two types of payment for trips:

Payment for trips
English	Finnish	Swedish	Description
Value	arvo	värde	A specific amount of money can be spent, within an unlimited time period. There were no inherent zone restrictions as each zone can charge for its trips individually.
Period	aika	period	An unlimited number of trips can be made, within a specific limited time period. The time periods were specific to each zone separately.

If the same travel card was loaded with both value and period, period took priority when applicable to the current zone. If the period ran out, or the passenger travelled to a zone where the period was not applicable, value was used instead.

The travel cards were bought through certain shops and Public Transport Information Centres.

The Helsinki Metropolitan Area Council managed the following zones before 2010:

- Helsinki
- Espoo and Kauniainen
- Vantaa
- Regional traffic 1: Helsinki, Espoo, Kauniainen and Vantaa
- Regional traffic 2: Espoo, Kauniainen, Vantaa, Kerava and Kirkkonummi (excluding Helsinki)
- Entire region: Helsinki, Espoo, Kauniainen, Vantaa, Kerava and Kirkkonummi
