= Metropolitan Area Transport Ltd =

Public transport company in Helsinki, Finland

- Native name: Pääkaupunkiseudun Kaupunkiliikenne Oy; Huvudstadsregionens Stadstrafik Ab
- Type: Osakeyhtiö
- Predecessor: Helsinki City Transport
- Founded: 2022
- Headquarters: Helsinki, Finland
- Area served: Greater Helsinki
- Subsidiaries: Suomenlinnan Liikenne oy
- Website: kaupunkiliikenne.fi

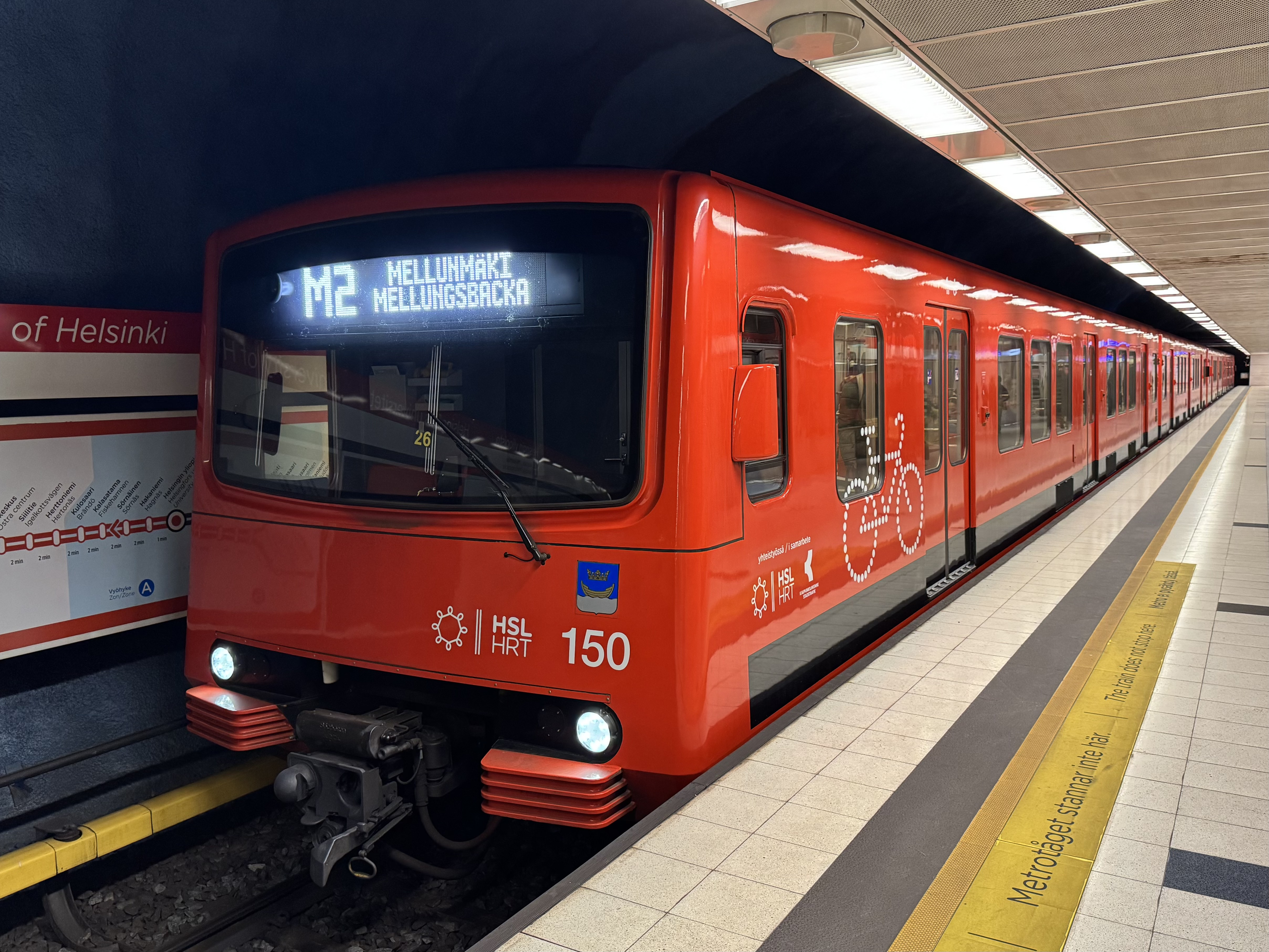
One of the metro trains in Helsinki

Metropolitan Area Transport Ltd (Finnish: Pääkaupunkiseudun Kaupunkiliikenne Oy, Swedish: Huvudstadsregionens Stadstrafik Ab) is a Finnish city-owned transportation company responsible for operating the Helsinki tram network and parts of the Helsinki Metro for the Helsinki Regional Transport Authority. Its subsidiary Suomenlinnan Liikenne Oy operates the Suomenlinna ferry.

The company was founded in February 2022 to replace Helsinki City Transport in order to better support the expansion of the metro and tram networks from Helsinki into the neighbouring cities of Espoo and Vantaa.
