= Helsinki City Transport =

City-owned public transport company

- Native name: Helsingin kaupungin liikennelaitos; Helsingfors stads trafikverk
- Company type: Public
- Industry: public transport
- Founded: 1945
- Successor: Metropolitan Area Transport Ltd
- Headquarters: Helsinki, Finland
- Area served: Helsinki
- Key people: Ville Lehmuskoski (Chief executive officer)
- Services: Public transportation Helsinki metro
- Owner: The City of Helsinki
- Website: www.hel.fi/hkl/hkl-fi

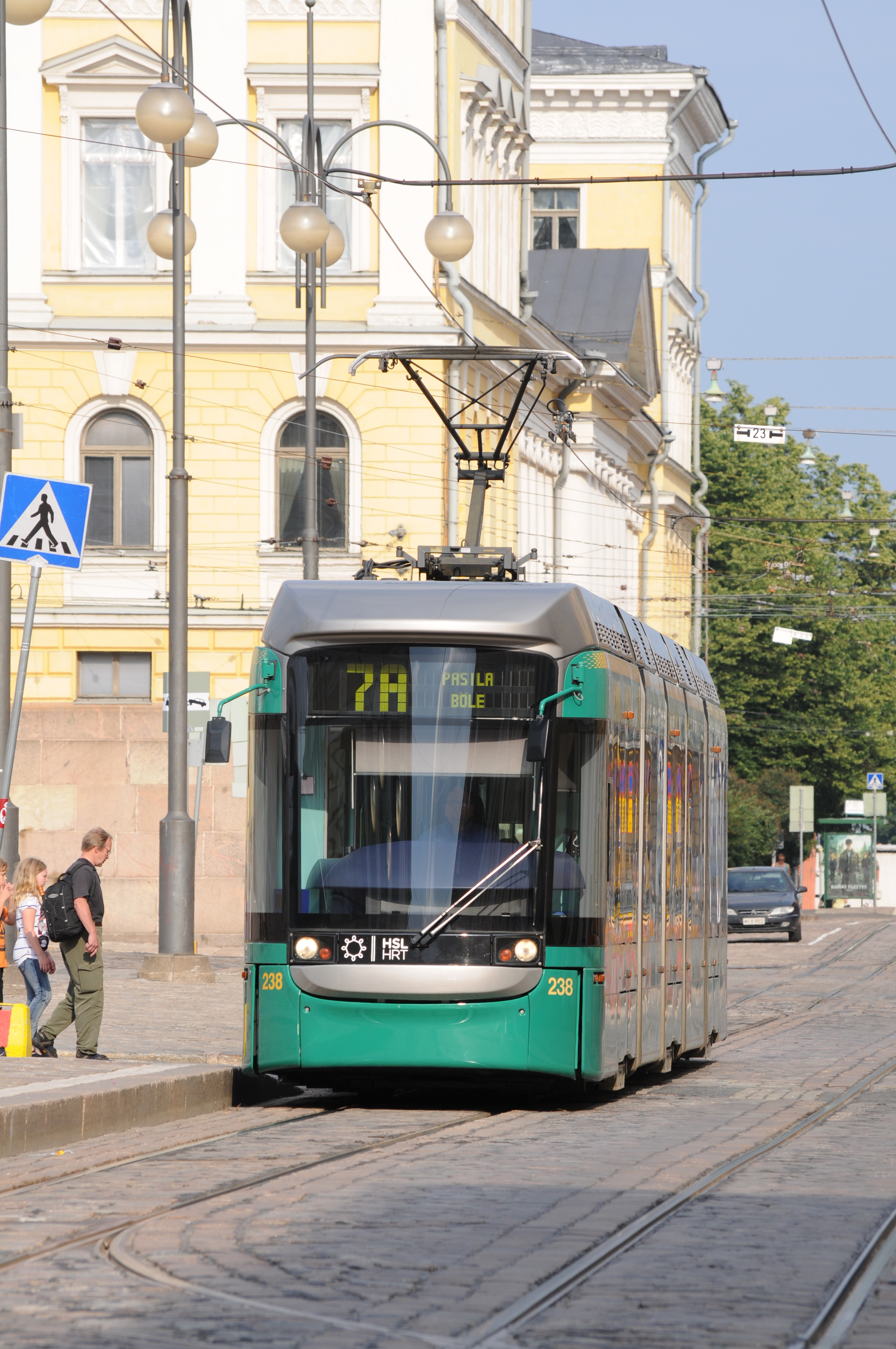
Tram 7A at the Senate Square (2011)

Helsinki City Transport or HKL (Finnish: Helsingin kaupungin liikennelaitos, Swedish: Helsingfors stads trafikverk, abbreviated to HST) is one of the contractors to the Helsinki Regional Transport Authority, conducting some operations related to the Helsinki Metro.

Until the founding of HSL in January 2010, HKL was responsible for the planning and organization of all public transport in Helsinki. HKL's bus operations were merged with another city-owned company, Suomen Turistiauto, to form a new bus company called Helsingin Bussiliikenne, which has since been acquired by Koiviston Auto. The majority of HKL's operations, excluding certain parts of the Metro operations, were corporatised and moved to Metropolitan Area Transport Ltd in February 2022.

== See also ==
- Public transport in Helsinki
- Helsinki metro
- Helsinki tram
- Helsinki City Bikes
