= Helsinki Regional Transport Authority =

Public transportation authority in Finland

- The public transport map of Helsinki (2025)
- Native name: Helsingin seudun liikenne (Finnish); Helsingforsregionens trafik (Swedish)
- Type: Kuntayhtymä (Inter-municipal cooperation)
- Predecessor: YTV; HKL
- Founded: January 1, 2010
- Headquarters: Opastinsilta 6 A, Helsinki, Finland
- Area served: Greater Helsinki
- Key people: Mika Nykänen (CEO)
- Services: Public transport
- Members: City of Helsinki; City of Espoo; City of Vantaa; City of Kauniainen; City of Kerava; Municipality of Kirkkonummi; Municipality of Sipoo; Municipality of Tuusula; Municipality of Siuntio
- Number of employees: c. 400
- Website: www.hsl.fi

The Helsinki Regional Transport Authority (Finnish: Helsingin seudun liikenne, HSL; Swedish: Helsingforsregionens trafik, HRT) is the inter-municipal authority that maintains the public transportation network of the nine municipalities of Greater Helsinki, Finland.

HSL oversees the operation of all of Helsinki's public transportation. The system consists of local buses, trams, metro trains, ferries, commuter trains, and bikeshare.

Apart from four electric buses, HSL does not own rolling stock. Due to this, HSL relies on third-party contractors for the day-to-day operation of the transit system.

== History ==
=== Founding ===
HSL was founded on 1 January 2010 on the basis of the Finnish public transportation law, joukkoliikennelaki, which was adopted on 3 December 2009. According to joukkoliikennelaki, HSL is responsible for the planning of public transportation in Greater Helsinki. The traffic functions of the inter-municipal Helsinki Metropolitan Area Council (YTV) and planning, procuring and tendering functions of Helsinki City Transport (HKL, within the city of Helsinki) were moved into the transport authority.

When it was founded, HSL had a revenue of over €500 million and approximately 350 employees.

=== Digitransit ===
In 2016, HSL started to develop a new version of its native journey planner, Reittiopas, originally released by YTV in 2001. The replacement intermodal public transport route planner, called Digitransit, is built on the open source OpenTripPlanner. Digitransit has been adopted by most public transport providers in Finland, (Note: In addition to the HSL region, Digitransit is used in Hämeenlinna, Joensuu, Jyväskylä, Kotka, Kouvola, Kuopio, Lahti, Lappeenranta, Mikkeli, Oulu, Pori, Raasepori, Rovaniemi, the Tampere region, the Turku region, and Vaasa.) and also by the pan-Estonian journey planner, the German cities of Herrenberg, Ludwigsburg, Aachen and Pforzheim, and the Embark transit authority in Oklahoma City.

== Transportation ==
HSL oversees the operation of all public transportation in the Helsinki region. However, apart from select bus routes with electric units, the agency does not operate any rolling stock. Therefore, it relies mainly on independent contractors for the operation of the network.

=== Metro ===
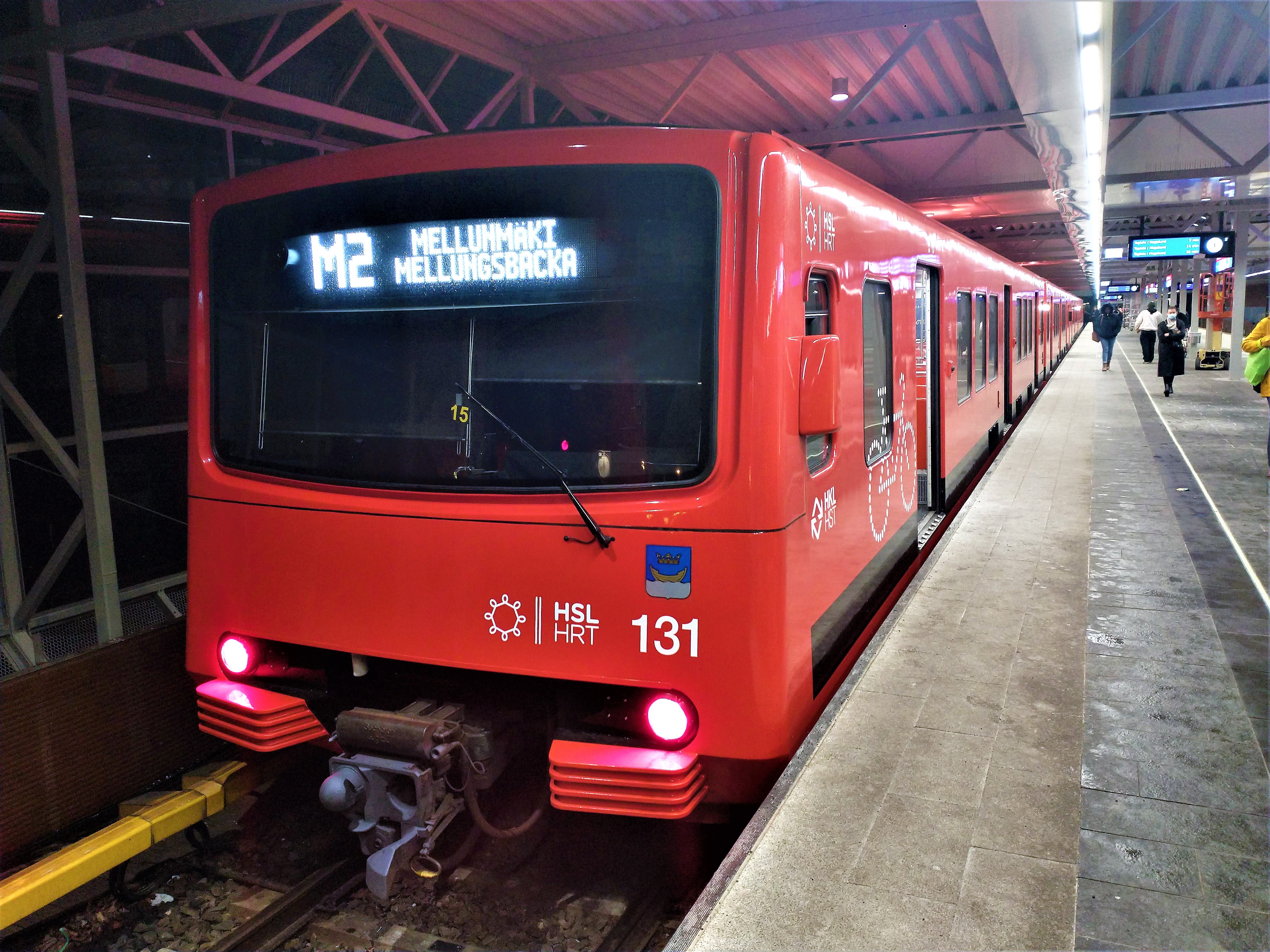
Renovated M100 Helsinki Metro train.

The Helsinki Metro is operated by HKL. The metro line opened in 1982. The system serves 30 stations in total on its two lines, M1 and M2.

==== Länsimetro ====
The first phase of the Länsimetro expansion program extended the metro lines west to Lauttasaari and southern Espoo, serving eight new stations. The second phase of the extension opened in December 2022. At that time, the total number of metro stations on the line increased from 25 to 30.

=== Commuter rail ===
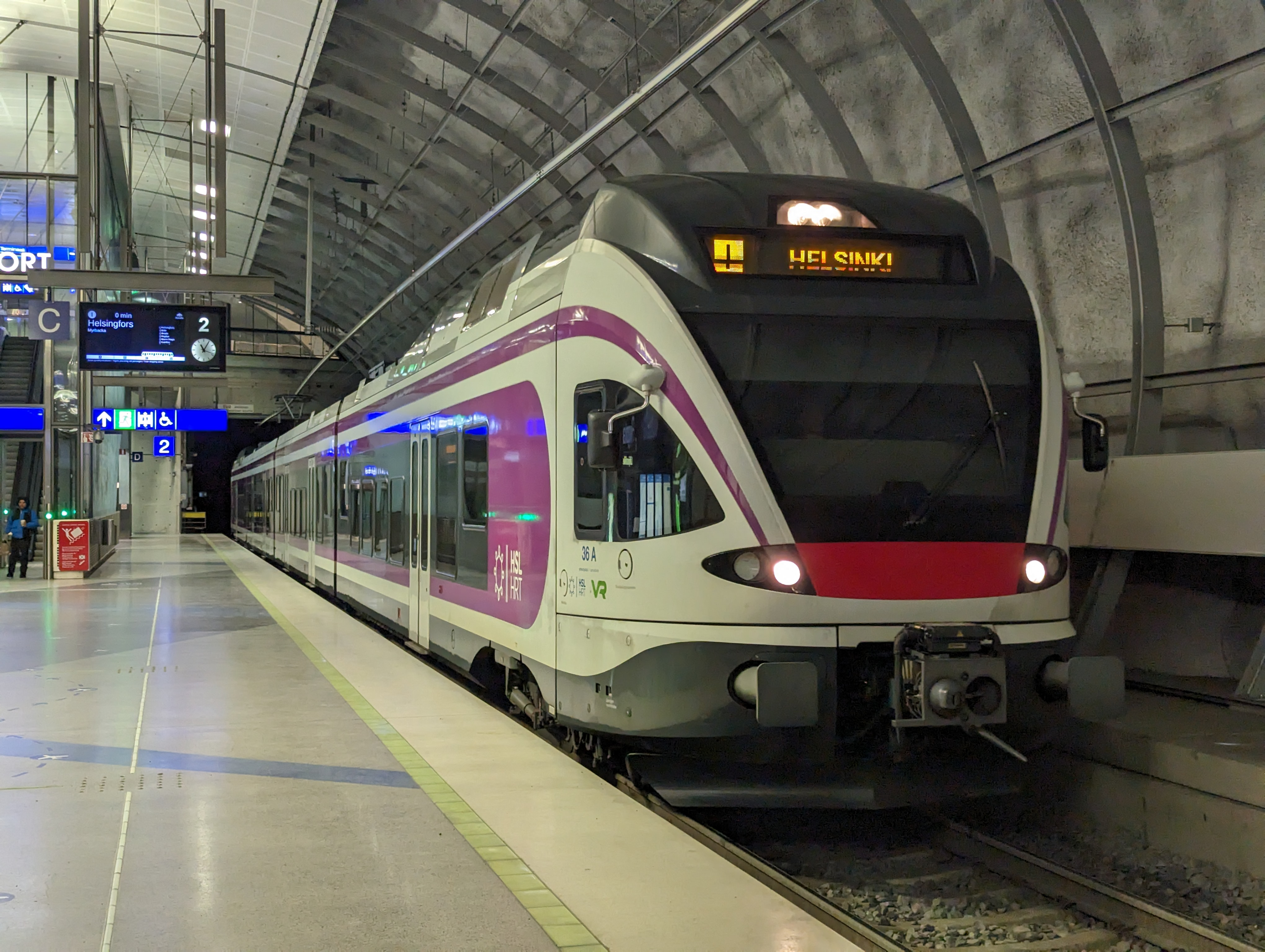
I train at Helsinki Airport station.

Commuter rail service in the region is operated by VR. There are 52 stations in the network, which are served by 15 lines. Out of HSL's three rail networks, commuter rail is the most far-reaching; it serves the northern, north-eastern, and western suburbs of the city, as well as Helsinki Airport in Vantaa.

=== Trams ===
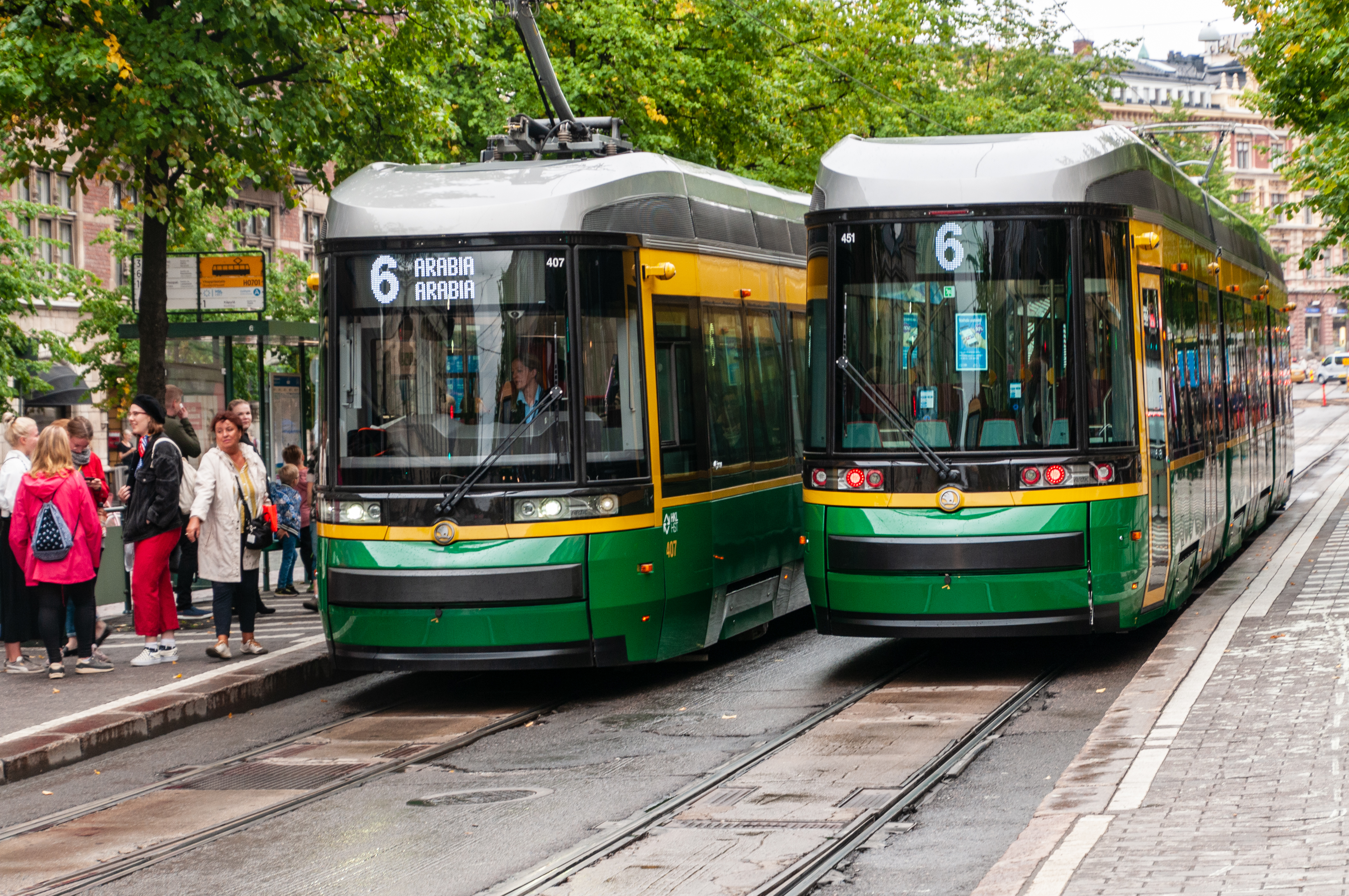
Helsinki Tram on line 6.

Trams in Helsinki are operated by HKL. Helsinki was the only Finnish city with tram service in use from 1972, when tram services in Turku ended, until 2021, when the Tampere light rail was opened. Tram service in Helsinki began in 1891.

The first light rail line, line 15, began operating in 2023.

=== Buses ===
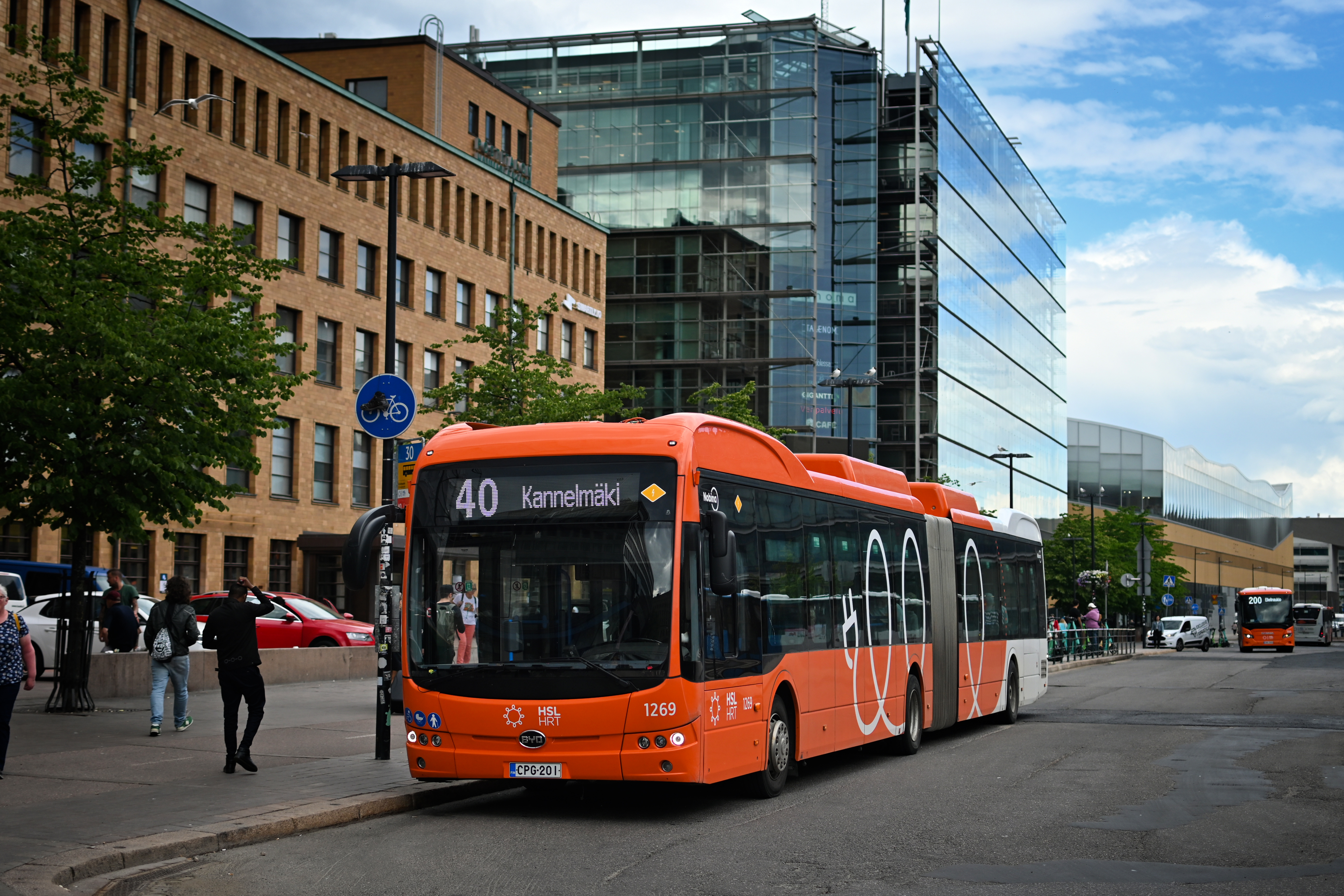
BYD electric bus on trunk line 40 in Helsinki

HSL offers three types of bus service: "blue" standard buses, neighbourhood buses and nine small headway crosstown "orange" lines ("runkolinja", literally: trunk lines).

HSL tickets are also valid on most U-routes which are run by separate companies and serve cities outside of the HSL area.

=== Ferry ===
A ferry to Suomenlinna is part of the HSL network. This route is operated by Suomenlinnan Liikenne Oy (SSL) on two ferries, Suokki and Suomenlinna II.

=== Bikeshare ===
In 2016 HSL launched Helsinki's bikeshare program. Starting on 2 May 2016, users could register to use the network for a day fee of €5, a week fee of €10 or the entire season from May to the end of October for €25. The initial network included 500 bikes, one of which a user could use to travel from any of the 50 stations to another.

The bikeshare system is a joint venture between CityBike Finland, HKL, and HSL. The system is sponsored by HOK-Elanto's grocery shop chain Alepa, which has purchased the commercial space on the bicycles. Due to this, the bicycles are colloquially known as alepapyörät (”Alepa bikes”).

In late 2016 HSL announced the details of a revamped bikeshare system, this time spanning 1,500 bikes and 150 stations. The expanded bike program brought the service to Munkkiniemi, Pasila, and Vallila. In addition to having 1,400 bikes and 140 stations in Helsinki, the service covered Matinkylä and Olari in Espoo with 100 bikes and 10 stations. The 2018 season saw a further-expanded network, with a total of 2,200 bikes at 220 stations, of which 70 are located in Espoo. The season fare was increased to €30.

== Ticketing ==
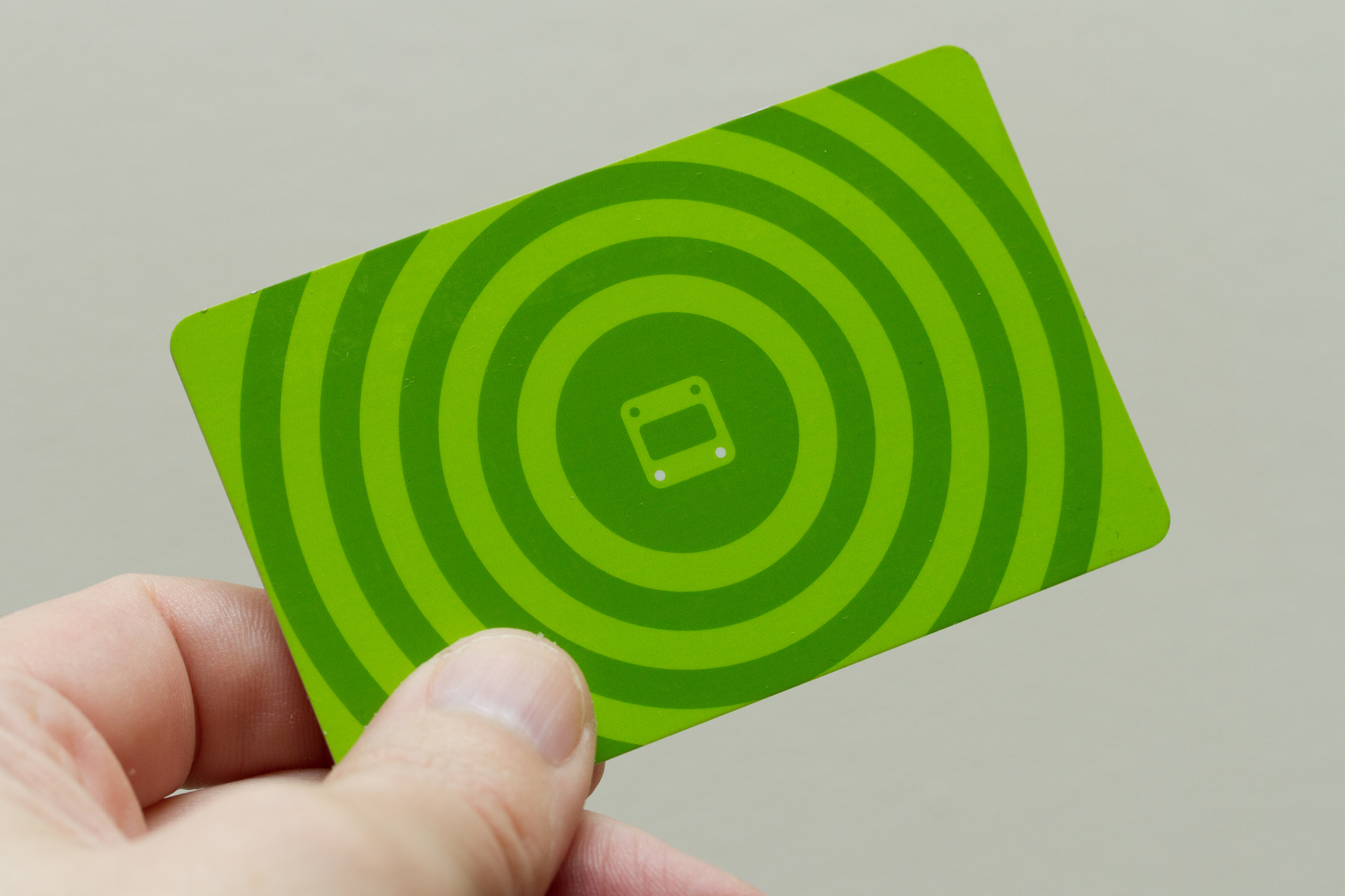
An HSL travel card in use until 2016

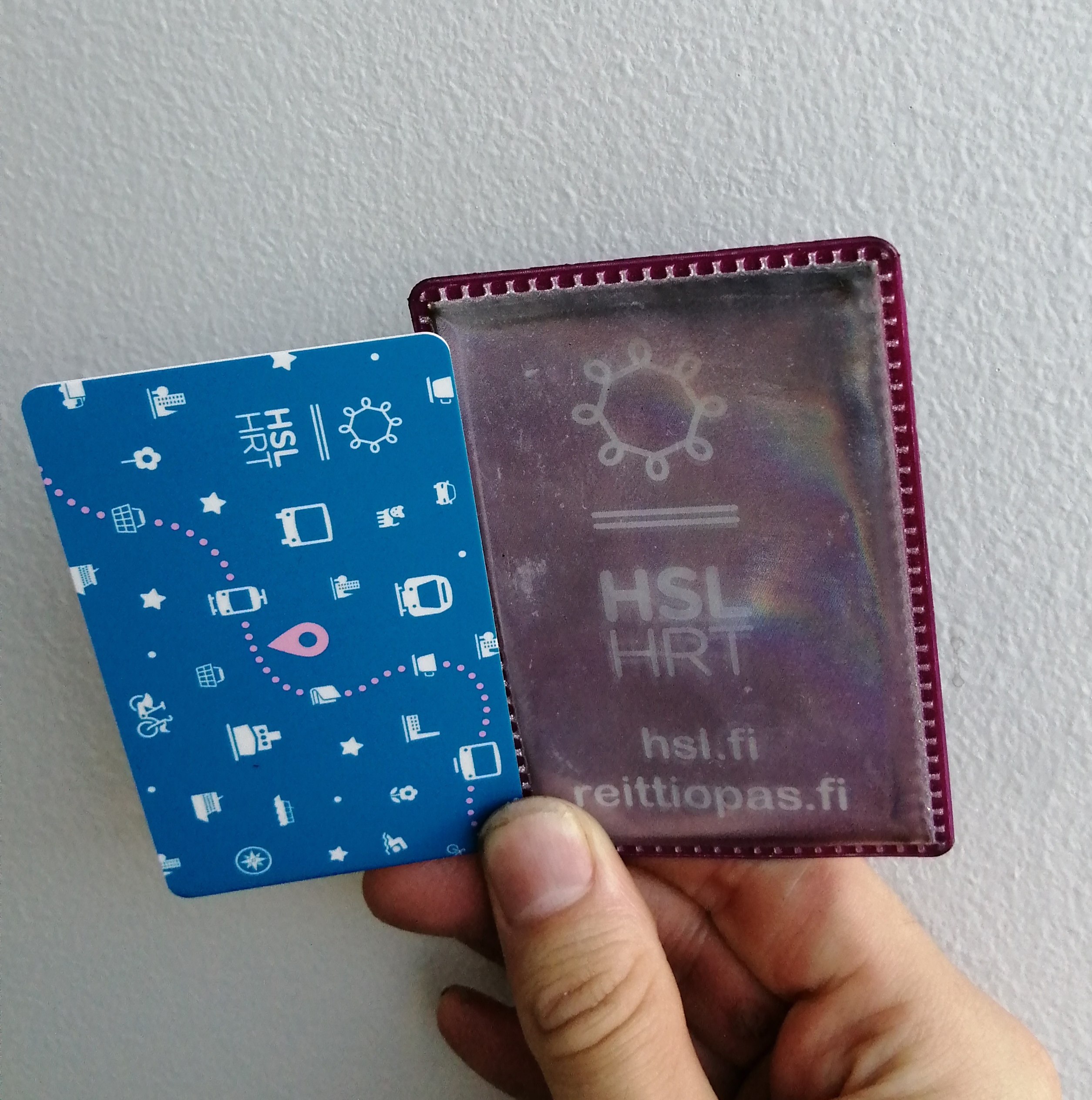
An HSL travel card in use since April 2016 alongside a reflective sleeve

Starting June 2026, the HSL area is divided into five zones designated with letters A–E and roughly circularly divided according to distance from the city centre of Helsinki. Customers are obligated to buy a ticket spanning at least two zones at a time. Available tickets include single, multi-journey, day and seasonal tickets, all of which can be bought using a travel card, from kiosks and select stores or from HSL's vending machines or mobile application.

HSL controls the sale and inspection of transit tickets. Apart from the bus network, all of HSL's services use a proof-of-payment system: there are no gates at metro and commuter rail stations or tram stops. Instead, passengers are required to present a valid ticket to fare inspectors, who randomly patrol the network. If caught without a valid ticket, a passenger must pay a fine of €100 in addition to the full price of the ticket.

=== Zones ===
- A – spans from the city centre of Helsinki to the districts of Lauttasaari, Etelä-Haaga, Käpylä and Kulosaari
- B – the rest of Helsinki, Kauniainen, eastern Espoo and southern Vantaa
- C – the Östersundom district of Helsinki, western Espoo and northern Vantaa
- D – municipalities of Kirkkonummi, Siuntio, Sipoo and Tuusula, and southern Tuusula
- E – municipality of Järvenpää and northern Tuusula

== Organization ==
HSL is owned by the cities of Helsinki, Espoo, Vantaa, Kerava, and Kauniainen and the municipalities of Kirkkonummi and Sipoo. In 2017, Tuusula and Siuntio voted to join HSL.

The other municipalities in the Greater Helsinki area (Järvenpää, Nurmijärvi, Mäntsälä, Pornainen, Hyvinkää, and Vihti) have the possibility of joining HSL in the future. About 1.3 million people live in the 14 municipalities of Greater Helsinki and the population is estimated to increase to approximately 1.5 million by the year 2030.

HSL's office is located in Opastinsilta 6 A, Helsinki.

== Work ==
HSL's duty is to do its part in taking care of the functioning, economical aspects and caring of nature in greater Helsinki. This goal is achieved by promoting the usage of public transportation and by organizing affordable and well functioning public transportation services.

HSL takes care of planning the regional public transportation and internal public transportation of Helsinki, Espoo and Vantaa. Beside planning, HSL also tenders the bus companies. The organization owns no buses or rail rolling stock.

One of the agency's jobs is to compile the Helsinki Region Transport System Plan.

== Identity ==
=== Name ===
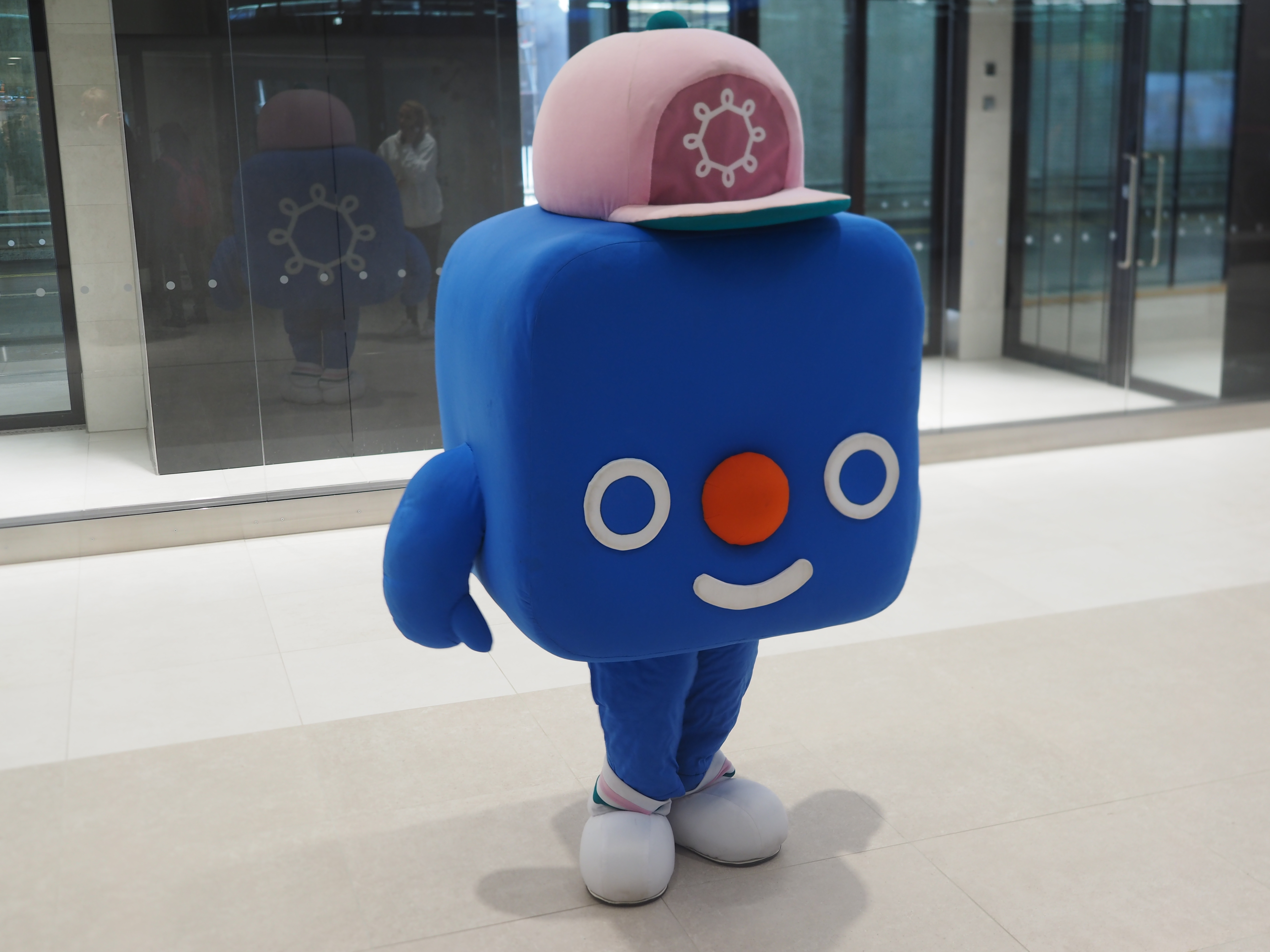
Välkky, a blue cube with a face and a cap, is the official mascot of the Helsinki Regional Transport Authority.

The official name of the transport authority is Helsingin seudun liikenne -kuntayhtymä HSL in Finnish and Samkommunen Helsingforsregionens trafik HRT in Swedish. The official name of HSL in English is Helsinki Regional Transport Authority. Also the shorter form of the name, Helsinki Region Transport (HSL) may be used in everyday use.

=== Visual identity ===
After the founding of HSL, the visual identity of all transportation services in Helsinki was unified under one brand name and logo. The HSL identity is heavily based on the color-coding of different elements to highlight the types of information presented; danger is represented in red, optional information in blue.

The visual identity of HSL was created by the design office Kokoro & Moi. The designers have explained the concept as:

"The outlook shows reliability, freshness and ease of approaching. The octagonal shape of the logo is symbolizing the expanding public transportation network. The loops in the logo remind of leaf shoots, telling of new ways of action and new partnerships and of ecological values. The eight loops also represent all cardinal directions and are sending a message of the broad-ranged function of the organization. In the middle of the logo there are two graphical lines, symbolizing uniting organizations and the public transportation with its tracks, wheels and map lines."

==== Colours ====
The base colour for HSL is blue (#007AC9). Each of the forms of transit are represented with a colour of its own.

The name of the colour	RAL	CMYK	RGB (Hex)
HSL blue	RAL 5015	100, 32, 0, 0	0, 122, 201 (#007AC9)
HSL pink	RAL 3015	1, 50, 0, 0	240, 146, 205 (#F092CD)
HSL Tram green	RAL 6024	100, 0, 85, 0	0, 152, 95 (#00985F)
HSL Commuter train purple	RAL 4008	43, 90, 0, 10	140, 71, 153 (#8C4799)
HSL Metro orange	RAL 2003	0, 78, 100, 0	255, 99, 25 (#FF6319)
HSL Ferry blue		76, 0, 5, 0	0, 185, 228 (#00B9E4)
Light rail turquoise	RAL 5021	96, 3, 35, 12	0, 126, 121 (#007E79)
Light green		65, 0, 100, 0	100, 190, 30 (#64BE1E)
Additional colours
Light Ferry blue		23, 1, 0, 0	190, 228, 248 (#BEE4F8)
Light pink		2, 14, 0, 0	244, 222, 234 (#F4DEEA)
Attention yellow	RAL 1018	0, 10, 100, 0	254, 209, 0 (#FED100)
Warning red	RAL 3027	0, 97, 46, 0	220, 4, 81 (#DC0451)

==== Fonts ====
Fonts used in HSL brand are Gotham Rounded and Gotham XNarrow. The foremost font type is Gotham Rounded which is present in most of the materials. Gotham XNarrow is used less, mostly in advertisements, quotations, numberings and line listings.

==== Pictograms ====
HSL has its own collection of dedicated pictograms which follow the design guidelines. They also offer a library for the ready-made pictograms that are used both in signposts and on the website as icons without the frame.

== Criticism ==
=== 2016 fare card readers ===
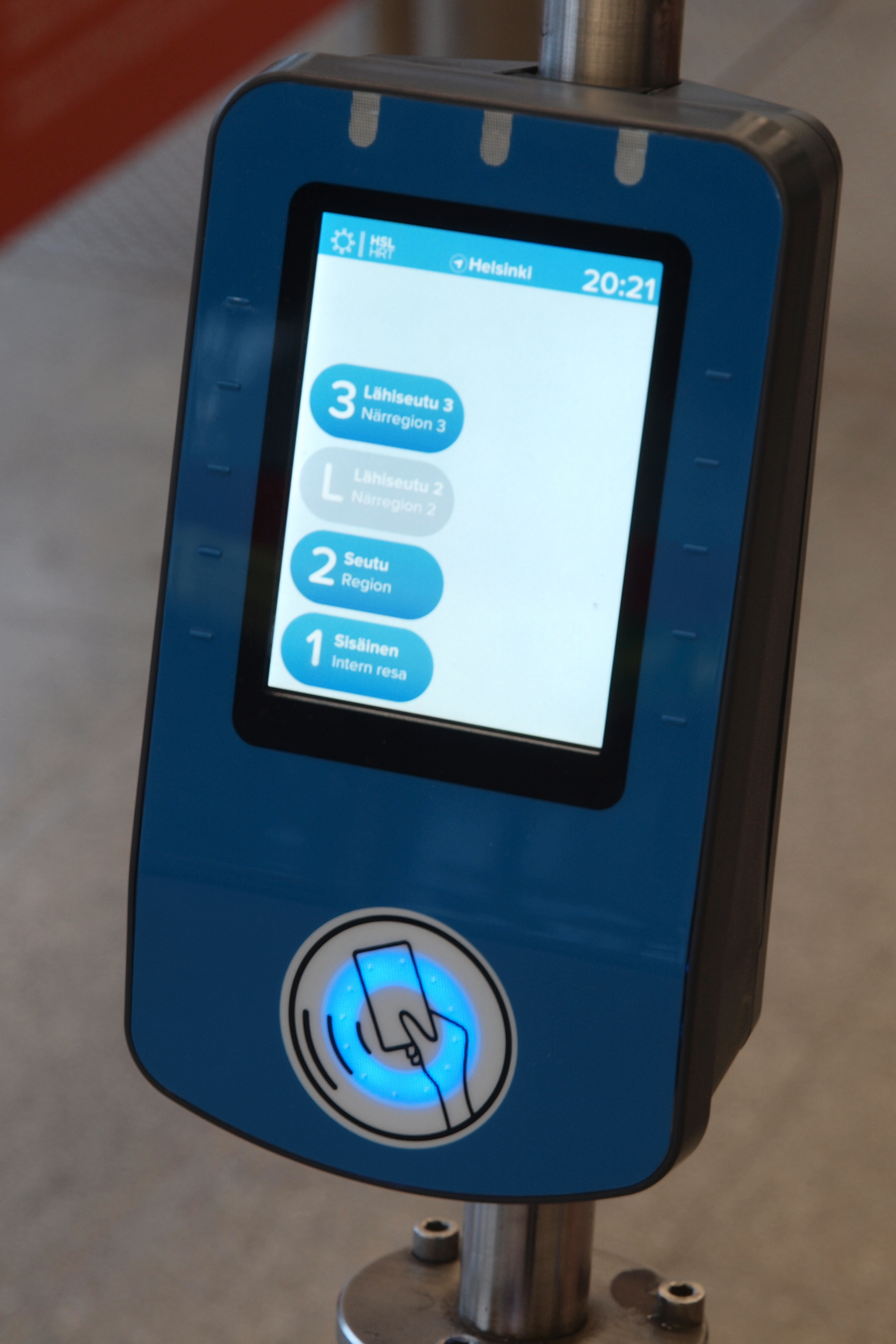
An HSL card reader, 2016 model

HSL began installing new fare card readers on public transportation vehicles in 2016. The new reader's interface was considered more difficult to use than the previous one, so HSL was advised to redesign the interface. Most of the criticism focused on the difficulty of using the device's OK button.

At the end of 2016, Yle reported HSL's decision to retain the interface. HSL's project manager, Satu Rönnqvist, explained the decision: "The old fare card readers have had many of these error selections, which result in thousands of compensation claims to HSL each year. These are being attempted to be reduced with this OK button."

In March 2017, Yle reported that HSL was still considering a new fare card reader interface. HSL's customer and sales manager, Mari Flink, said that the company was conducting user tests regarding the ease of use of fare card readers. After these user tests, in the fall of 2017, HSL made the validation of season tickets faster.

The fare card readers have been replaced again in 2024, allowing contactless payments with Visa and Mastercard.

=== Selection of new CEO ===
HSL's first CEO, Suvi Rihtniemi, retired and on November 3, 2020, Mika Nykänen was selected as her successor. Nykänen will come from the position of director of the Geological Survey of Finland and has no previous experience in public transportation. HSL's board voted on the selection and in the election HKL's CEO Ville Lehmuskoski and Nykänen both received seven votes, and the selection was then decided by drawing lots.

The selection of a new CEO in 2020 became politicized a few days before the selection. Mika Nykänen, who was selected for the position, has a long history in the National Coalition Party, and his selection as director of the Geological Survey of Finland has been considered political. Other candidates for the CEO position included HKL's CEO Ville Lehmuskoski, OnniBus.com's founder Pekka Möttö, and other veterans of the public transportation industry.

=== Requirement for a smartphone and a certain operating system ===
In the summer of 2021, HSL (Helsinki Regional Transport Authority) decided that starting in 2022, students would only be able to receive discounts on fares purchased through the HSL mobile app. Student status would be automatically verified through the Ministry of Education's Koski service. Students whose information is not found in the Koski service, such as students of folk high schools, would be able to receive discounts on physical fare cards. HSL's decision was appealed to the administrative court, as receiving the student discount would require owning a smartphone if the student's information is found in the Koski service. The appeal also argued that the smartphone and its operating system must be sufficiently new for the HSL app to function. The phone's operating system must be Android or iOS. The Helsinki Administrative Court overturned HSL's decision, stating that students are entitled to receive discounts on physical fare cards in addition to the app. The decision was justified by ensuring equality.
