= Public transport in Helsinki =

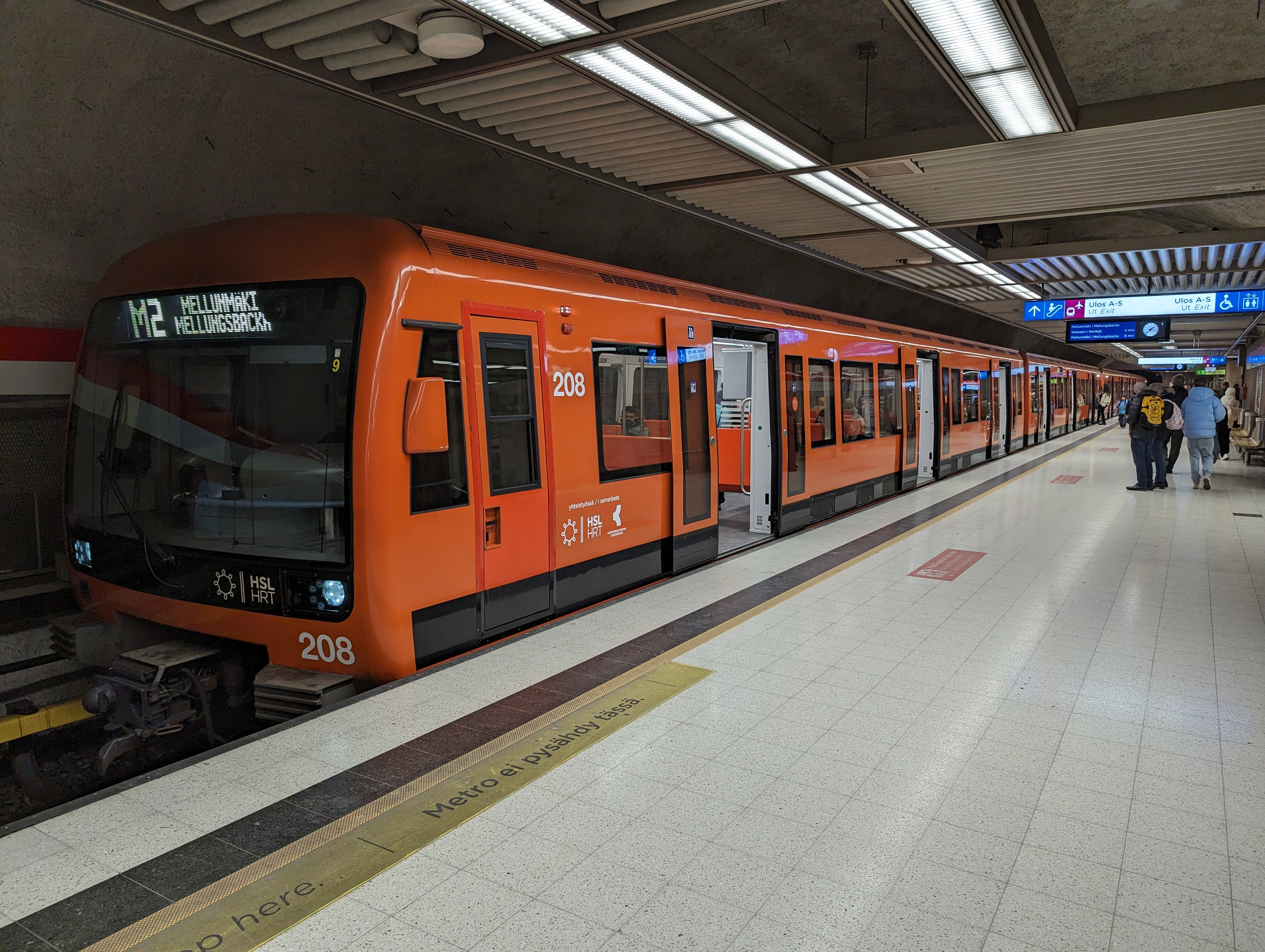
A renovated M200 metro train.

Public transport in Helsinki consists of bus, tram, metro, local railway and ferry services. The system is managed by the Helsinki Regional Transport Authority (Finnish: Helsingin seudun liikenne, or HSL) and covers Helsinki, Espoo, Kauniainen, Vantaa and the outlying Kerava, Kirkkonummi, Sipoo and Tuusula.

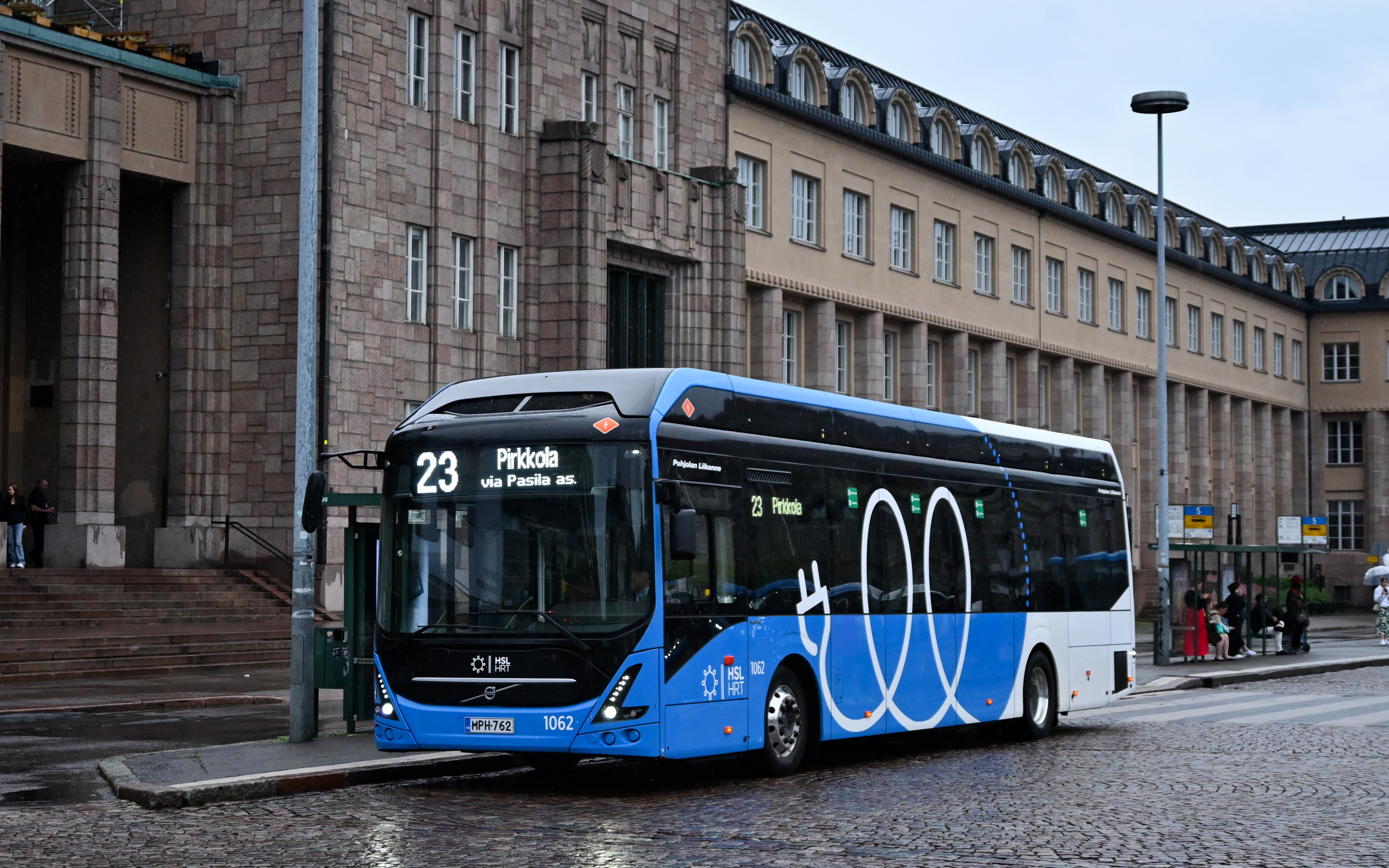
Helsinki Volvo 7900E bus

Until the August 9, 2021 opening of the Tampere light rail, Helsinki was the only Finnish city to have a tram system. The city of Turku dismantled its tram system in 1972, and Finland lost the city of Vyborg to the USSR in World War II and the city subsequently withdrew its trams in 1957. In 2017, construction started on a tram line in the city of Tampere; services initiated in 2021.

50% of commuting trips within the city limits of Helsinki are made using public transport and only 28% using a private car, while 48% of the households have access to a car. For comparison, Helsinki's public transport system has a higher ridership than any city in the U.S. except New York.

The Helsinki Metro, opened in 1982, was the first, and so far the only, rapid-transit metro system in all of Finland. The metro currently serves the eastern suburbs of Helsinki, some areas close to the city center, and parts of southern Espoo. For the first 16 years of its existence, the line was topologically only one straight line, but in 1998 a branch to the eastern suburb of Vuosaari was opened. The construction of the long-debated western extension of the metro system into southern parts of Espoo was approved by Espoo City Council in 2006. The eight-station first phase was opened in November 2017, and the second phase, extending metro service west to Kivenlahti, opened in December 2022. Helsinki is also planning to extend the existing metro line from its eastern terminus at Mellunkylä to Östersundom, an area annexed from Sipoo by Helsinki in 2009 for the purpose of building a large new planned community.

Local trains operate on grade-separated, dedicated tracks on three rail lines that radiate out from the Helsinki Central railway station. Most routes offer rapid-transit-like service with a peak headway of 10 or 15 minutes, the last trains departing from Helsinki city center only after 1 am, or 4 am on weekend nights. A service to the Helsinki Airport began in July 2015, when the Ring Rail Line extension to the system opened. A number of the local and regional trains run further out to towns as far north as Riihimäki and Lahti and as far west as Karis on tracks shared with long-distance trains. These regional services have headways of up to one hour and often more limited operating hours.

Long-distance trains depart from the Central Railway Station and Pasila railway station to destinations across Finland. Intercity trains offer connections to major Finnish cities.

A railway tunnel has been proposed to connect Helsinki with Tallinn, though the proposal is still in the investigation phase.

== Bus services ==
=== Trunk bus lines ===
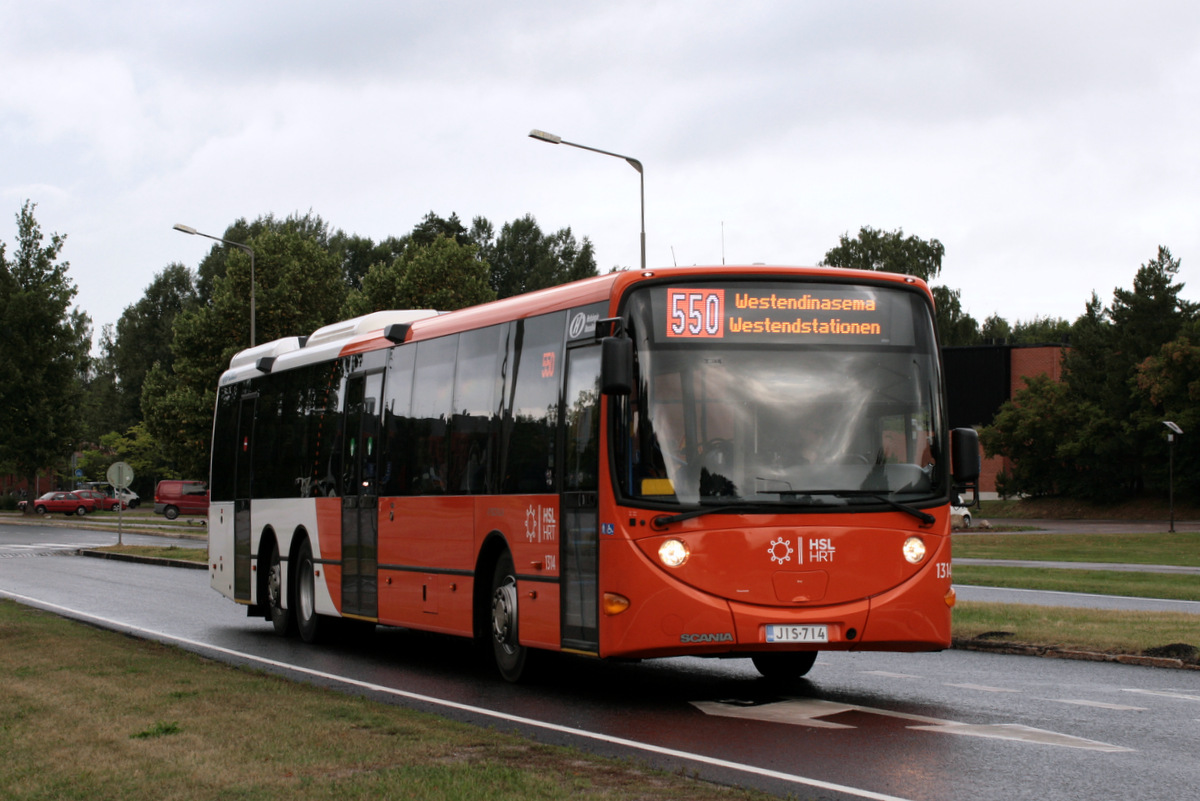
Helsingin Bussiliikenne bus on HSL trunk line 550, on the day the traffic started with the new fleet and image.

In August 2013, HSL launched the first trunk bus route, the orbital line 550, formerly branded Jokeri. The trunk lines are meant to provide "metro-like" service with very short headways and a distinguishable fleet. The second orbital trunk line, number 560, opened in August 2015. Trunk lines 500 and 510 started in August 2019. August 2020 saw the addition of trunk line 200, while August 2021 was the start date of trunk buses 20, 30, 40 and 570. Trunk lines 300, 400 and 600 started in August 2022. In August 2023, lines 520 and 530 started.

=== Regular bus lines ===
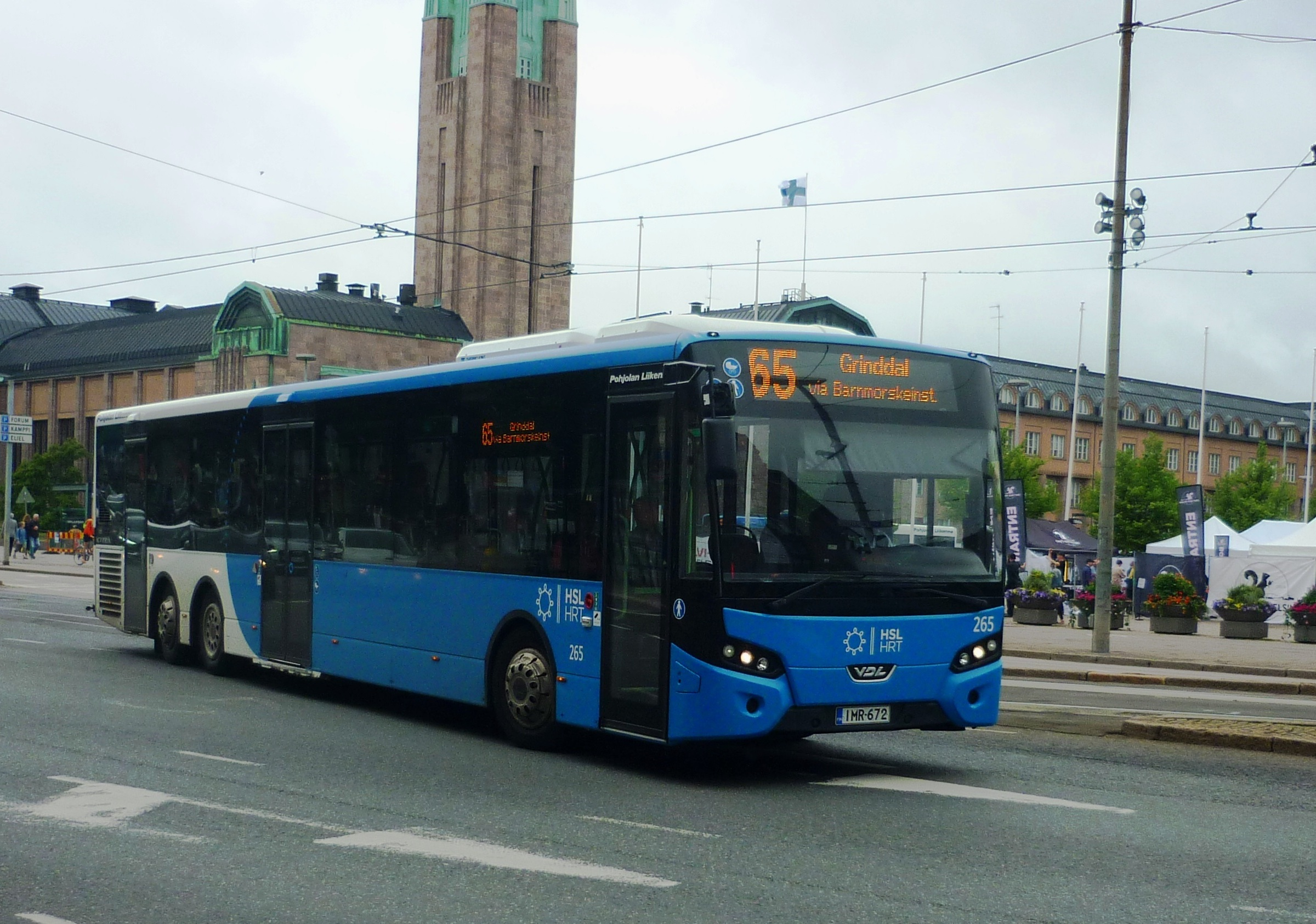
Pohjolan Liikenne bus on HSL line 65. The bus is in HSL's livery, which is a requirement for all new buses offered in tenders.

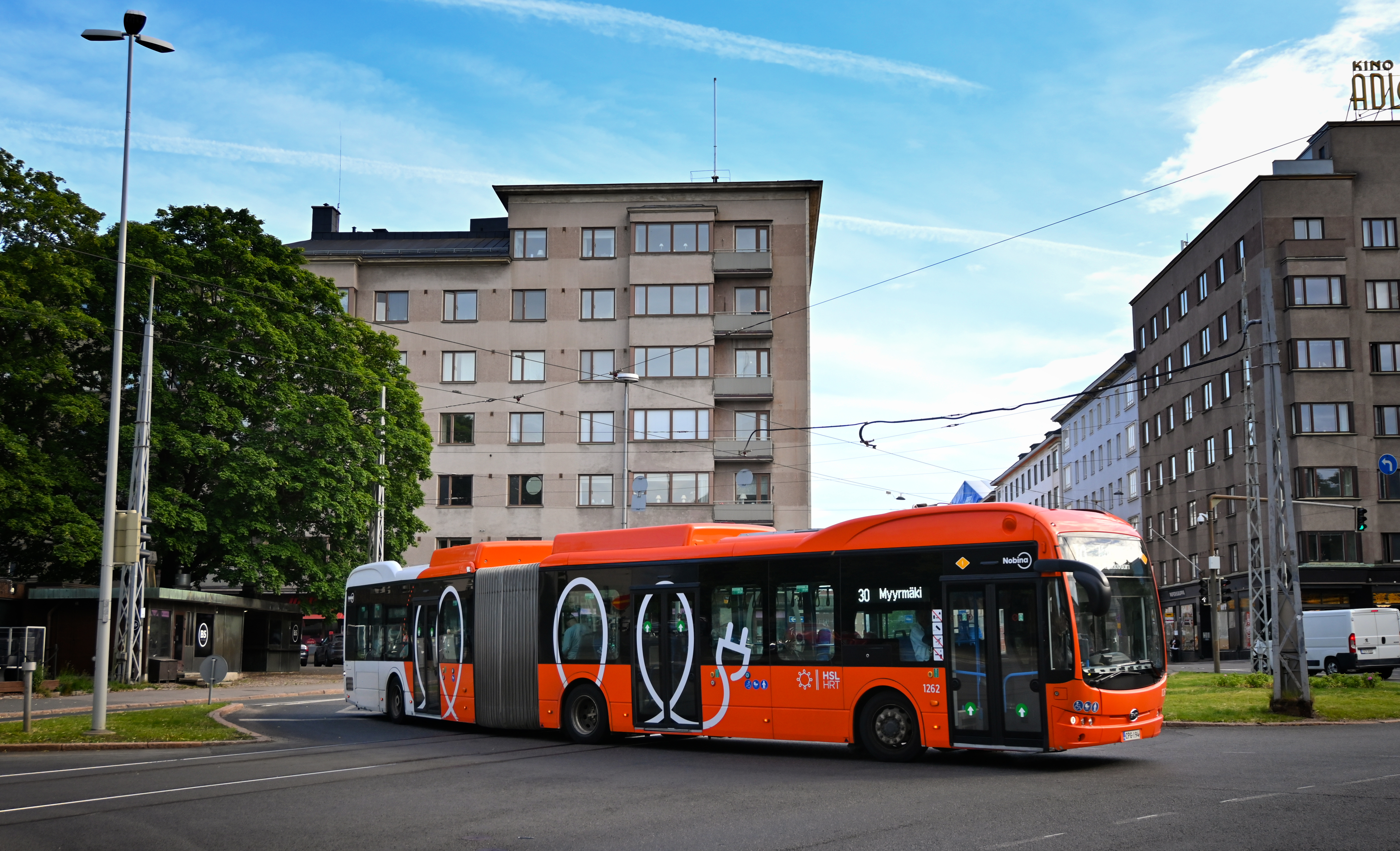
HSL articulated bus on trunk line at Töölö

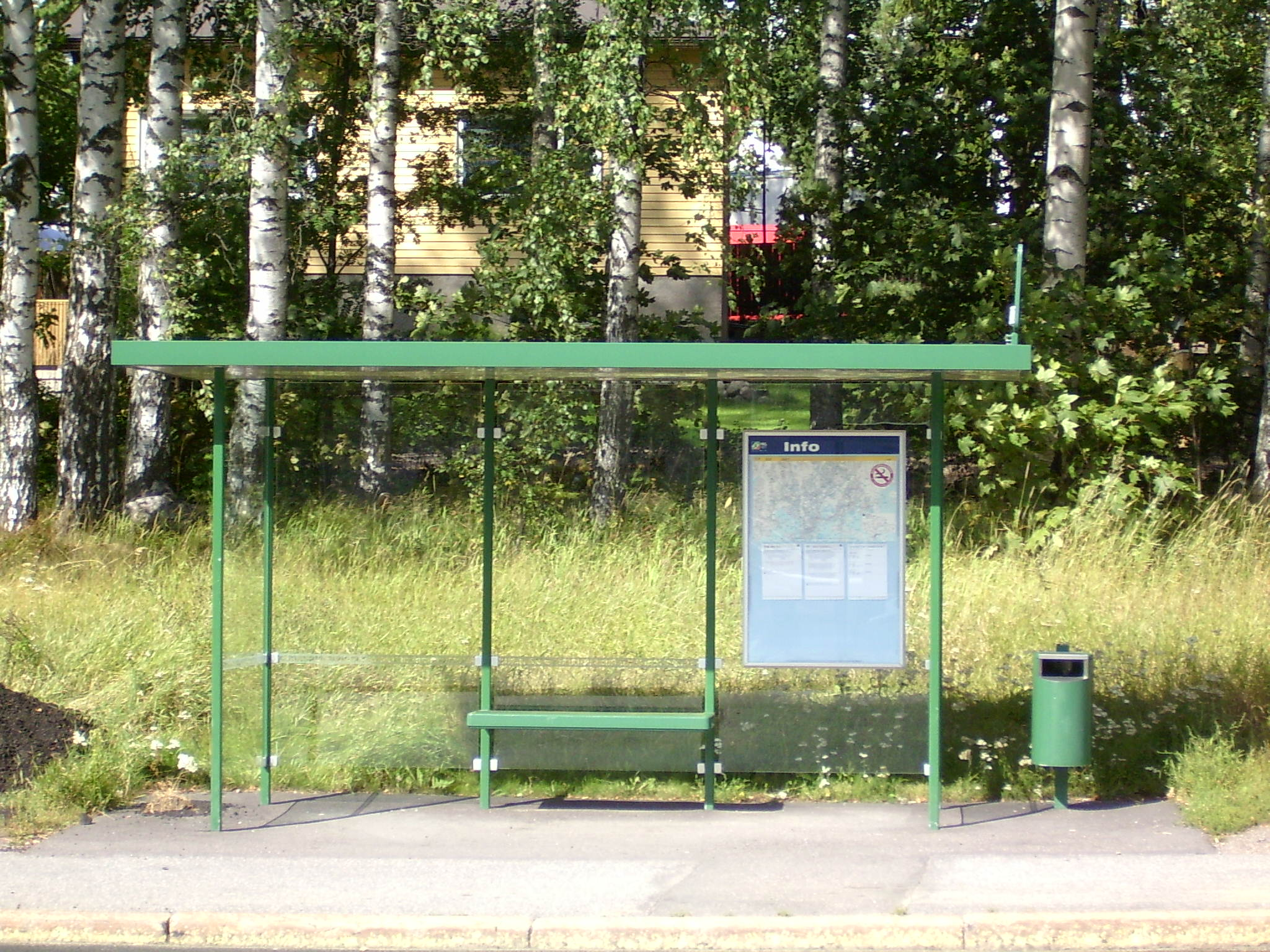
Kaadekuja bus stop

Internal bus routes of Helsinki can be found almost anywhere in Helsinki. For some parts of the city, even high-density, these buses provide the backbone of the public transportation system.

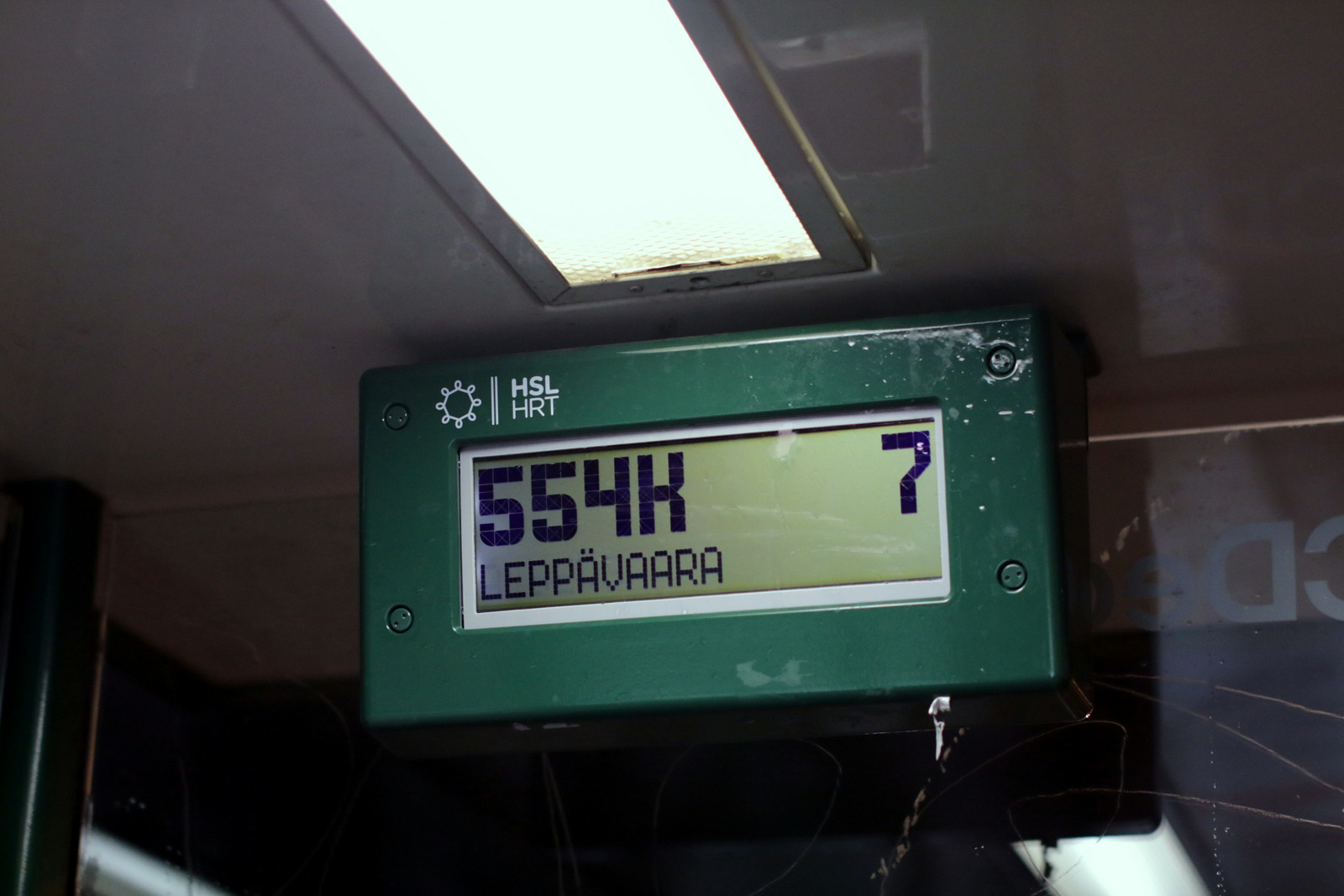
An electronic, battery-powered timetable display found at selected stops

The routes are drawn and the timetables set by HSL, but operated by independent companies. HSL tenders a route or a set of routes and the company offering to operate the route for the best quality-price ratio will get the contract. The quality is measured with a pointing system which gives points for such aspects as the quietness, environmental efficiency and the size of the buses that would be used. The biggest bus operators are Nobina Finland, the VR (state rail) owned Pohjolan Liikenne, and Helsingin Bussiliikenne (HelB). These companies run a majority of the contract services.

Many of the buses operating in eastern Helsinki and Southern Espoo act as feeder lines for the Helsinki Metro. Nearly all other routes have the other end of their lines in the downtown near the Helsinki Central railway station. Such exceptions are present as dedicated lines operating directly from a suburb to another past the centre (for example Helsinki buses 51–54, 56–59).

The line numbers for the internal lines contain two or three digits and sometimes one or two letters.

Most lines are operated between 5:30 and 23:30, the most popular between 5:00 and 1:30. In daytime outside of rush hours the basic interval for buses is mostly either 10, 15, 20, 30 or 60 minutes depending on the length and the demand of the line. Nighttime lines that operate only from 23:30 to 1:30 (and sometimes early morning) are signified by the additional letter N. Recently the tradition of having designated night routes has been broken and replaced with N-variants of daytime routes.

Other letters include:

- A: lengthened route, often to Kamppi, Elielinaukio or Rautatientori
- B: shortened, less direct route, often a feeder to a nearby metro station
- H: trams to/from Koskela and Töölö depots
- K: exception in route, often a lengthier route through a neighbourhood or termination somewhere different
- R: robot bus
- T: exception in route, often involving serving long cul-de-sacs
- V: rush hour route (usually along a highway or busier roads)
- Z: faster or more direct route (usually along a highway or busier roads)

Helsinki bus terminals include Kamppi (mainly used for night and rush-hour buses), Rautatientori, Elielinaukio and Hakaniemi. Larger metro stations have their own feeder bus terminals.

=== Night bus ===
Most daytime bus lines run between the hours of 5:30 and 23:45, with the most popular lines running until 1:30. On weekends, night buses operate between 1:30 and 4:00. During these times, there is a direct bus connection to all areas from the centre of Helsinki, while during the daytime for many of the same areas it would require a combination of train and bus or metro and bus to get to the same places. At least 40 such night routes are part of the Helsinki bus network. As with daytime buses, the bus drivers do not sell tickets or cards onboard and they must be purchased in advance. Helsinki Central Station is the local transport hub for night buses in the city centre.

=== Regional services ===
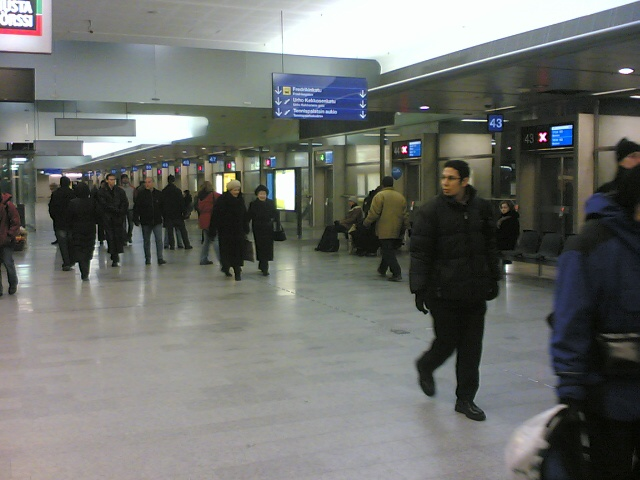
Kampin keskus, the terminal of night and rush-hour buses to Espoo

The regional bus lines are currently managed by HSL in similar manner to the management of the internal lines of Helsinki. The regional lines are specially designed for moving people between important points in the metropolitan area and for the sole purpose of getting to downtown Helsinki. These lines tend to use the fastest possible way to get out of Helsinki, usually through motorways.

Lines from southern Espoo terminate at Kampin keskus during peak hours only, the ones from central Espoo and western Vantaa terminate at Elielinaukio and the ones from northern Vantaa and Kerava terminate at Rautatientori. The last two mentioned are located next to the central railway station. Some lines from central Espoo terminate at Kamppi instead of Elielinaukio.

The operating hours for regional lines are similar to those of internal lines, but the departures are often not as frequent.

At most times, the line numbers are composed of three digits and occasionally a letter or two accompanying them. Two-number regional lines are rare, and thus far only two have been created: 39 Kamppi-Myyrmäki (replaced by trunk bus 30) and 74 Hakaniemi-Porttipuisto (IKEA).

== Tram and light rail ==
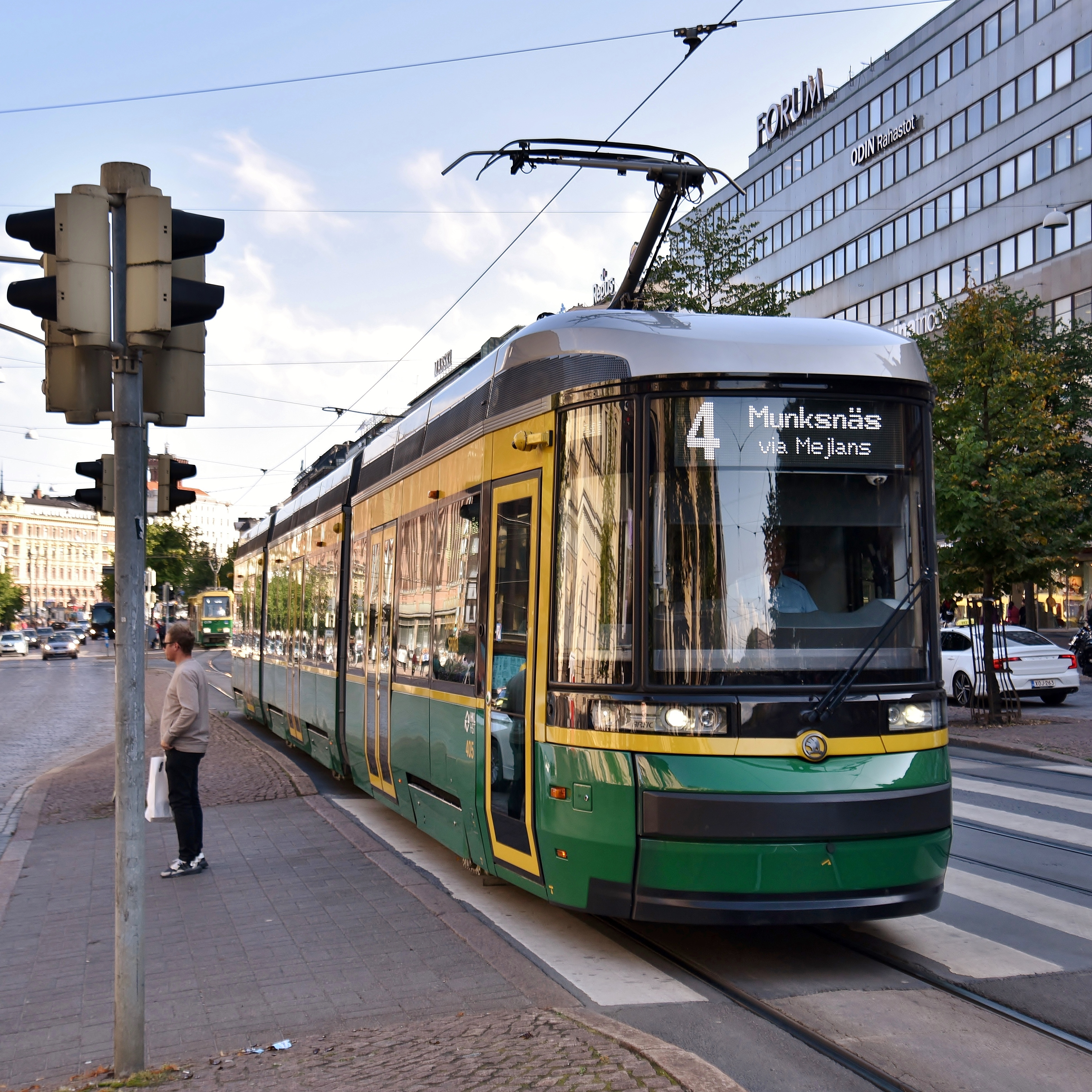
Škoda Artic on line 4

Helsinki's tram network has been operated continuously with electric drive since 1900 and it is mostly of a traditional type, with all of the tramways located on the streets, on both dedicated tram lanes and in mixed traffic. The network covers the densely populated central districts and some of the adjacent areas, but it has been expanded only very modestly after the 1950s. The network is composed of 10 lines, all of which except one (line 8) run through some part of the city centre. Over 50 million trips are made with the trams each year.

In addition to the streetcar style tram network in and near the city center, Helsinki has a single light rail line (line 15 connecting Keilaniemi and Itäkeskus), with several projects in various stages of planning and construction. The current line 15 is separate from downtown tram lines, but the systems are compatible with each other.

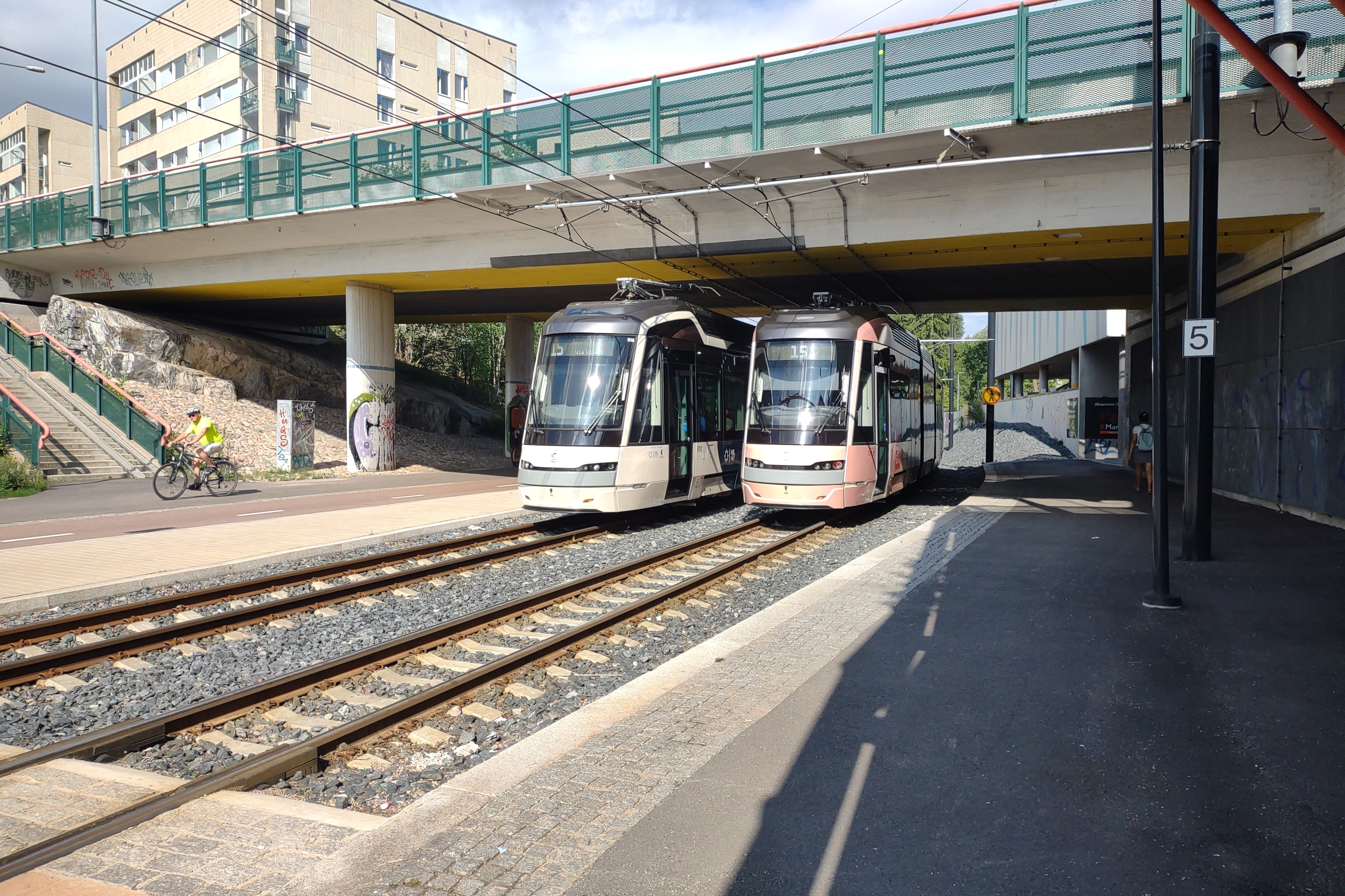
"Jokeri" light rail line in Helsinki, Finland, 2024 July

All tram and light rail lines are currently operated by Metropolitan Area Transport Ltd.

== Metro ==
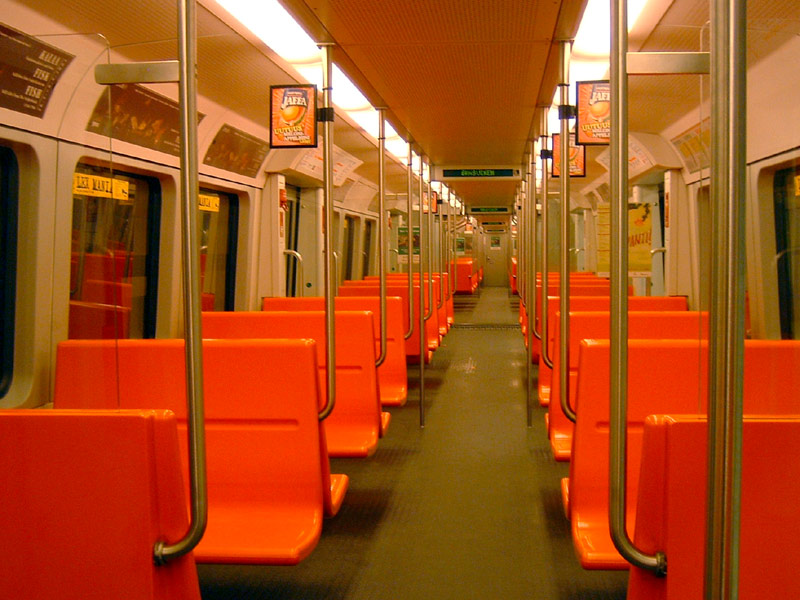
Interior of a series 200 metro

The metro is the backbone for traffic east and west of central Helsinki. The system consists of two lines, M1 and M2, with a total of 30 stations.

The metro is managed and operated by HKL.

== Commuter rail ==
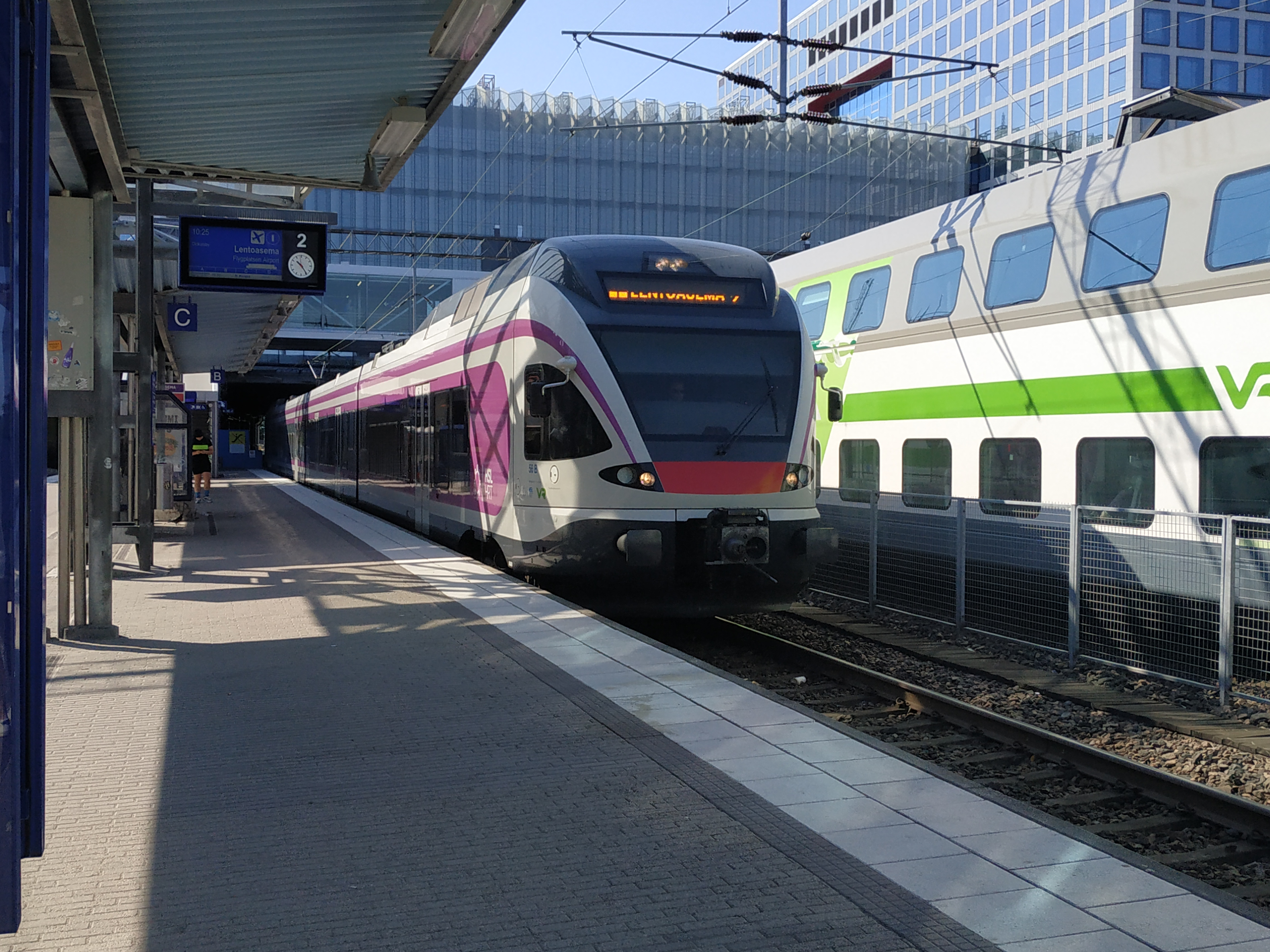
HSL's Sm5 commuter train next to VR's intercity train at Pasila

The commuter rail system is the backbone for the areas northeast and northwest from downtown. The network reaches relatively far from Helsinki with metro-like services from Helsinki to Kerava, Kirkkonummi and the Helsinki Airport. The network is managed by HSL and operated by VR. Trains not managed by HSL reach even further, to Lahti, Tampere via Riihimäki and Kouvola.

== Ferry ==
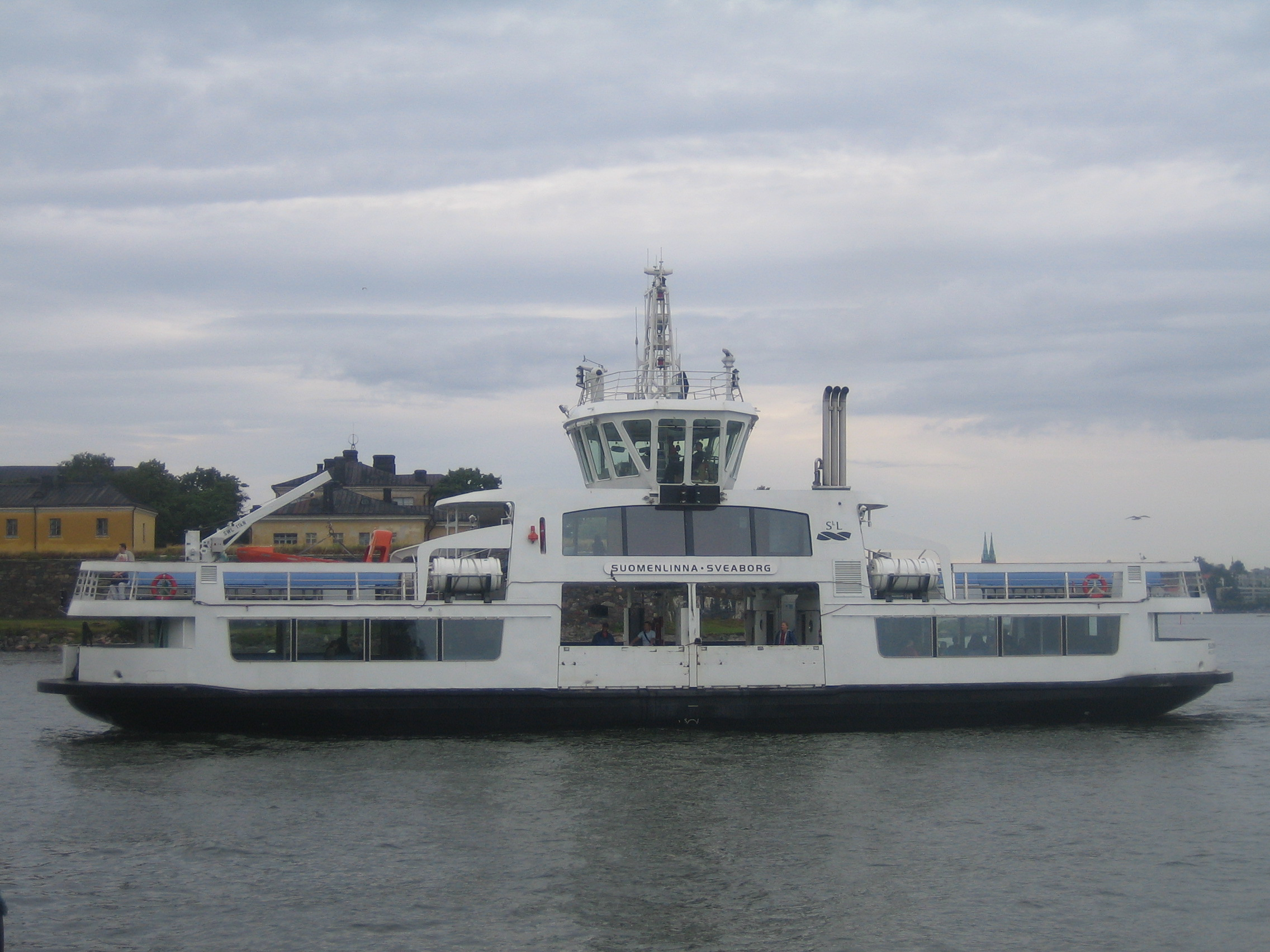
M/S Suomenlinna II

Helsinki has three ferry lines, all operated by Suomenlinnan Liikenne Oy. One ferry line connects Suomenlinna to the Market Square. There is also a maintenance ferry to Suomenlinna on weekdays that leaves from Katajanokka. The ferries are the only connection to the mainland for the residents of Suomenlinna, though a tunnel for emergency vehicle access is in place. The third line connects the mainland (from Meritullintori) to the Kruunuvuorenranta.

There is also ferry to the Korkeasaari Zoo, although is not part of the general ticket system. There is a land access to the Zoo with bus number 16.

== City bikes ==
Helsinki's city bike system was opened in May 2016 with 50 city bike stations and 500 bikes serving the inner city area. The system was expanded in 2017 to cover an additional 100 stations and 1000 bikes. Currently the network consists of 345 stations with 3450 bikes. The annual ridership in 2018 was 3,218,800.

== Tickets ==
=== Zones ===
Under the current fare system, the region is divided onto five arch shaped zones: A, B, C, D and E. Zone A covers the inner Helsinki to about five kilometers from the Helsinki Central Station. Zone B covers rest of Helsinki (excluding areas in the east added to Helsinki in 2003) and parts of Vantaa and Espoo and whole Kauniainen. It covers up to 14 km from the Central station. Zone C covers the east most parts of Helsinki and rest of Espoo and Vantaa, including the airport. Zone D covers all of Sipoo and Kerava, and most of Tuusula in the northeast, and Siuntio and Kirkkonummi in the west. Zone E was split from zone D in 2026 and includes northern Tuusula as well as all of Järvenpää.

=== Ticket types ===
The transport system offers a vast number of different tickets and several ways to get them.

Single fare tickets can be bought from ticket machines or by a mobile app. Single trip tickets are valid for 80–110 minutes, depending on the zones used. Each metro station and ferry stop, and most railway stations, are equipped with at least one ticket machine. Tickets are not sold on board vehicles.

Most users of the public transport have a Travel Card, an RFID card used as an electronic ticket. Users can load period and value on their cards. Period ticket offers unlimited travel for the dates paid for. Value is used to pay for one trip, which may contain changes.

=== Fare collection ===
On most buses, the driver checks tickets as passengers board. The metro, local trains, trams, ferries, and nine bus lines classified as trunk lines use a proof-of-payment system: fare inspectors check tickets on randomly selected vehicles, and charge a fine of €100 and the price of a single ticket to those who do not have one. If a passenger has forgotten their Travel Card with valid travel period, the passenger may later visit a service point of the transport company and will not have to pay the fine.

== See also ==
- Public transport
  - Public transport in Tampere
- Urban sprawl
