= Helsinki Central Station =

Major railway terminus in Finland

Helsinki Helsingfors
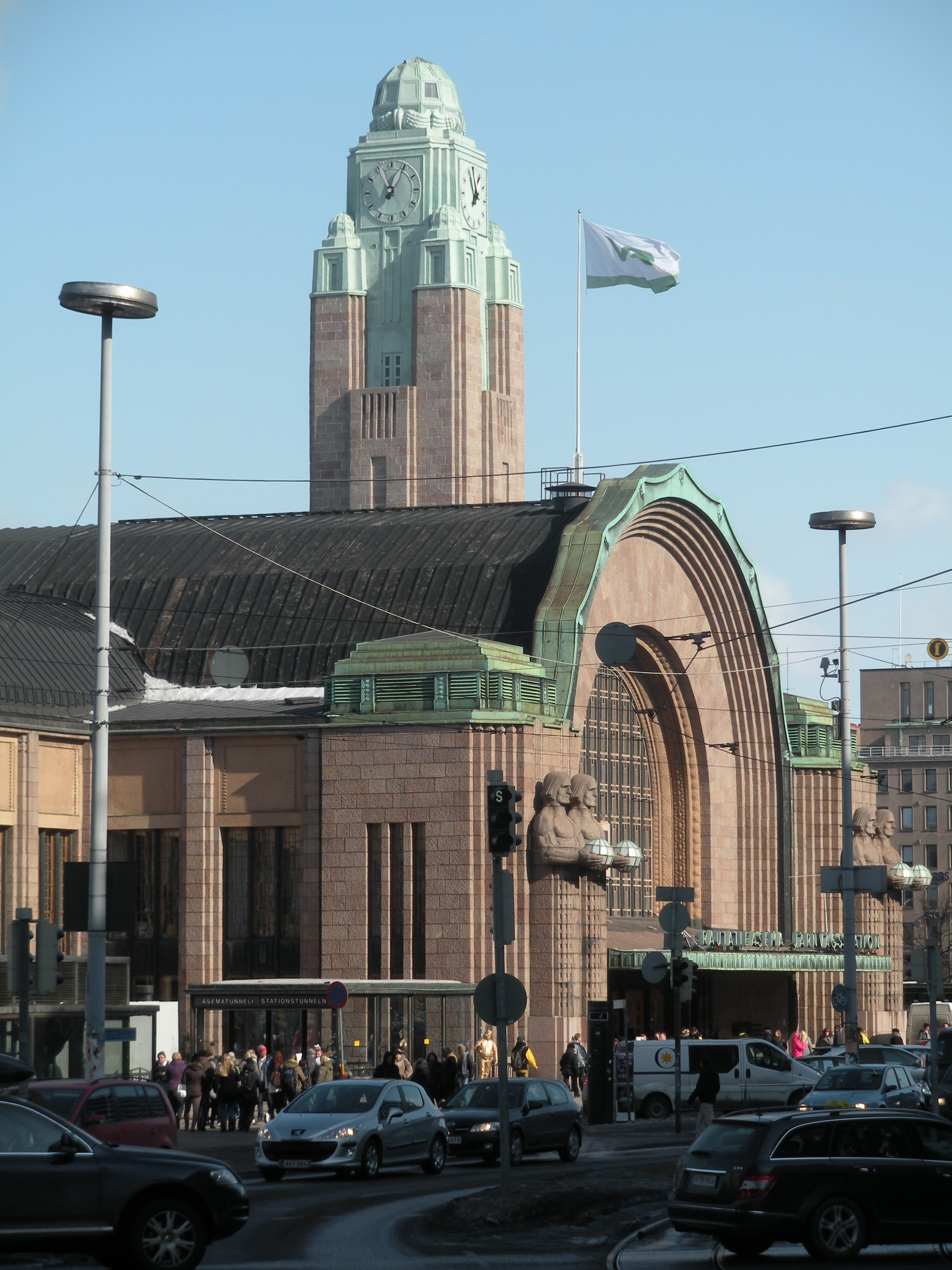

General information
- Location: Kaivokatu 1, Helsinki; Finland
- Coordinates: 60°10′19″N 24°56′29″E
- System: VR long-distance train and HSL commuter rail interchange station
- Owner: Finnish Transport Agency
- Operator: VR
- Manager: VR
- Lines: Helsinki–Riihimäki railway Helsinki–Turku railway
- Distance: 0 km
- Platforms: 19
- Tracks: 19
- Train operators: VR
- Bus stands: 13 departure, 2 arrival
- Connections: M1 M2 Metro station Helsinki tram lines from Rautatieasema 3 5 6 7 9 from Lasipalatsi 1 2 4 10 Helsinki Buses

Construction
- Structure type: Ground station
- Platform levels: 1

Other information
- Station code: HKI
- IATA code: HEC
- Fare zone: A
- Website: www.vr.fi/en/railway-stations-and-routes/helsinki

History
- Opened: 1862; 164 years ago (originally); 1919; 107 years ago (existing building)
- Rebuilt: 1909; 117 years ago

Passengers
- 2019: 37,005,824 (Helsinki commuter)
Services
Preceding station	Helsinki commuter rail	Following station
Terminus	U	Pasila towards Kirkkonummi
Terminus	L	Pasila towards Kirkkonummi
Terminus	A	Pasila towards Leppävaara
Terminus	E	Pasila towards Kauklahti
Terminus	Y	Pasila towards Airport
Terminus	I counterclockwise via Tikkurila	Pasila towards Airport
Terminus	P clockwise via Myyrmäki	Pasila towards Helsinki via Airport
Terminus	K	Pasila towards Kerava
Preceding station	VR commuter rail	Following station
Terminus	T	Pasila towards Riihimäki
Terminus	D	Pasila towards Riihimäki or Hämeenlinna
Terminus	R	Pasila towards Riihimäki or Tampere
Terminus	Z	Pasila towards Lahti or Kouvola
Terminus	H Limited service	Pasila towards Hanko
Preceding station	VR Group	Following station
Terminus	Helsinki–Riihimäki	Pasila towards Riihimäki
Terminus	Helsinki–Turku	Pasila towards Turku Harbour
Terminus	Helsinki–Kemijärvi (overnight service)	Pasila towards Kemijärvi
Terminus	Helsinki–Kolari (overnight service)	Pasila towards Kolari
Former services
Preceding station	Finnish State Railways	Following station
Terminus	Polaria	Tampere towards Oulu
Terminus	Lapponia	Tampere towards Oulu
Terminus	Botnia Express	Tampere towards Vaasa
Terminus	Karelia	Lahti towards Joensuu
Terminus	Imatra Express	Lahti towards Imatra
Terminus	Savonia	Riihimäki towards Iisalmi
Location
- Location within Helsinki (mainland)

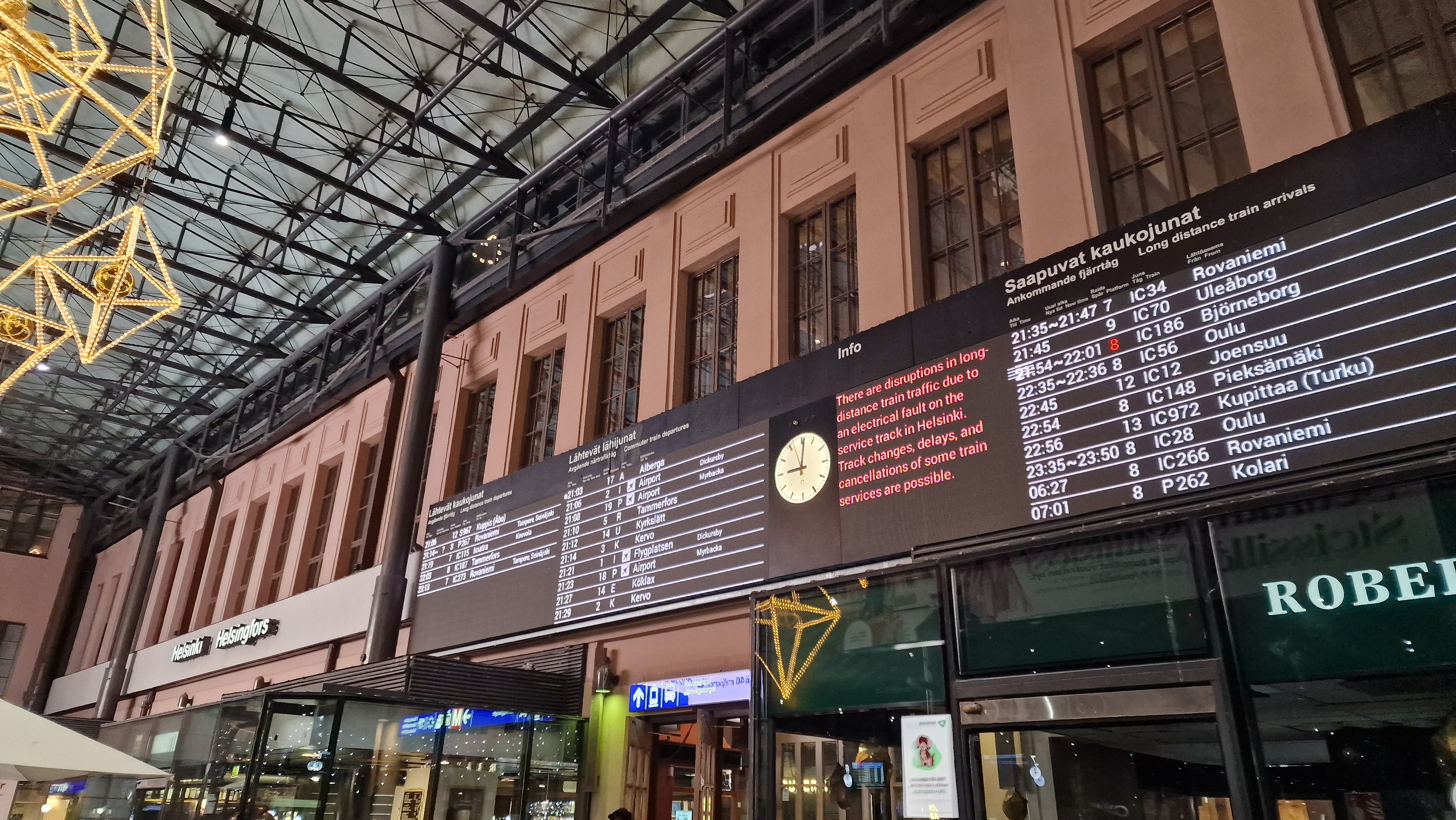
Long-distance train departures at Helsinki Central Station

Helsinki Central Station (Finnish: Helsingin päärautatieasema, Swedish: Helsingfors centralstation) (HEC) is the main station for commuter rail and long-distance trains departing from Helsinki, Finland. About 200,000 people "pass through the station" every day, half of whom are train passengers. The station serves as the terminus for all trains in the Helsinki commuter rail network, as well as for all Helsinki-bound long-distance trains in Finland. The Rautatientori (Central Railway Station) metro station is located in the same building.

The railway tracks in Helsinki were built in the 1860s. The station building, clad in granite, was designed by Eliel Saarinen and inaugurated in 1919. The building is known for its clock tower and the Lyhdynkantajat ("The Lantern Bearers") statues by Emil Wikström. Helsinki Central was chosen as one of the world's most beautiful railway stations by BBC in 2013. The Helsinki Central Station has become the symbol of the entire railway network in Finland. For example the VR Group uses the image of the station and the statues next to its main entrance in its advertising.

== Overview ==
The Helsinki Central Station is located in the city centre of Helsinki, in the district of Kluuvi at Kaivokatu 1. The main facade of the station building is towards the Kaivokatu street. To the east of the station is the Helsinki Railway Square and to the west is the Eliel Square. The Eliel Square also served as the terminus of the Finnair City Bus. The Asematunneli tunnel leads from the station, underneath Kaivokatu, to the underground floor of the City-Center complex. The station also has a connection to the Central Railway Station metro station located underneath it.

The Helsinki Central Station is an important transport hub for commuter train, long-distance train and metro transport in the entire Helsinki capital region. The station is visited by 240 thousand passengers per day, making it the most visited building in the entire country of Finland. About half of the visitors are train passengers. Over a hundred long-distance trains and about 850 commuter trains arrive at and depart from the station every weekday.

The middle part of the station building forms the core of the station, hosting the waiting halls, ticket sales, the kiosk hall and connection to the station tunnel. The eastern wing of the building used to host the offices of the railway administration. It also served as Helsinki's main post office, until it moved to the Postitalo building built in the 1930s. The head office of the VR Group moved to Pasila in 2018. The eastern wing was converted into a Scandic Hotels hotel, opened in 2021. Baggage storage spaces have been located in the underground floor of the western wing since the 1970s. The ground floor has hosted a café since the 2000s, and the top floor hosts offices and business spaces. The station hosts almost twenty kiosks and restaurants, visited by over 20 thousand people per day.

== History ==
=== The railway comes to Finland ===
When visiting Finland in 1856, Grand Duke of Finland Alexander II of Russia proposed an improvement program for the Finnish economy. He thought it was important to connect the inland country to the marine harbours through canals and railways, so planning of Finland's first railway from Helsinki to Hämeenlinna was started.

==== Location of the railway and the station ====
There were four different options for the railway line and three possible locations for the station. In 1857 option number 4 (shown in blue) was chosen to be built, and the Helsinki Central Station was decided to be built in Kluuvi.

A 1853 railway project proposed the northern edge of the Hietalahdentori square as the location of the Helsinki railway station. A later proposal in 1857 was at the vicinity of the Turku barracks, and a third option was the environment of the Kluuvi well. Investigation of the new railway line in summer and autumn showed how difficult it would be to build a railway into the city of Helsinki, which was located at the point of a peninsula. The research resulted in four different options of the railway line. These options differed greatly in cost. The original plan included 40,800 Russian roubles for the main station of the railway, but the most expensive option was estimated at 162,000 roubles.

The cheapest option would have had the railway to make a curve after Pasila and go around the Töölönlahti bay. The second option would have had the railway go directly west from Pasila past the Töölö sugar factory. The third option would have passed Pasila entirely and continued around Töölönlahti. All these options would have located the station to the south of the Turku barracks. In the fourth option, the track would go from Pasila straight across Töölönlahti and the Kaisaniemi Park to Kluuvi, with the station located immediately after the Kluuvi well. This option was the most expensive, costing about 107,970 roubles. Of the four options, it required the most of blasting the bedrock and filling the Kluuvinlahti bay.

The three first options required dismantling villas and other buildings from the shore of the Töölönlahti bay and building railway tracks on beautiful and farmed land from the environment of the city. In addition, the costs of the compulsory purchase of the land would have been significantly greater than in the fourth option. Another concern was that a steep curve directly after the railway station would cause more wear on both the tracks and the train wheels. This would result in danger of the train tilting, causing a decrease of the efficiency of the engine. The option for the straight railway line had the benefit of an unobstructed view from the station to the traffic on the tracks. The fourth option received the most support, and it was accepted on 26 November 1857.

The choice was perhaps also influenced by Knut Stjernvall serving as the technical director of the railway company at the time, whose stepfather Carl Johan Walleen owned Villa Hakasalmi on the western shore of the Töölönlahti bay. The three other options would have required dismantling the villa.

Because of the decision, citizens of Helsinki started worrying about the fate of the Kaisaniemi Park located next to the Kluuvi well. It was clear that the railway would override part of the park area. Per the request of the citizens, the railway line was moved slightly to the east in 1859, in order to preserve the two large and beautiful hills in the park.

==== Filling the Kluuvinlahti bay ====
The area where the station was planned to be built was originally seabed. In the 19th century the area was a muddy and stinky water area used as a dump and a public outhouse. Filling the Kluuvinlahti bay originally started already in the 1830s, but the filling really came into action when the railway was being built.

The bay was confined at Hakasalmi, ditches were dug into the Kluuvi swamp, and a stone-walled assembly pool was built behind the dam, from where the water was pumped into Töölönlahti by wind power. Many horse cart loads of sand were dumped into the area during the decades.

According to the plans in the 1830s, the area to the north of Kaivokatu and to the west of Mikonkatu was to be divided into two blocks, which were named Hyeena ("hyaena") and Hilleri ("polecat"), separated by the street Hakasalmenkatu, now known as Keskuskatu. The decision to build the railway decided the fate of the Hyeena and Hilleri blocks. Knut Stjernvall made the final railway plan in 1859. He proposed that a wide market square should be built on the place of the Hyeena block east to the railway yard. The few buildings left in the Hyeena block were dismantled, and it was changed into what is now the Rautatientori square. Construction of the first railway station in Finland started at the edge of the Hilleri block.

The construction of the railway station had a great impact on the Helsinki cityscape. The railway was piled with large logs, and stones were laid on the edge of the bay. Aspen trees had to be cut down from the Kaisaniemi Park to make way for the railway, but the park was preserved whenever it was possible to do so. Rock blasted off the Linnunlaulu cliff was sunk into the Töölönlahti bay beneath the railway tracks being constructed. The railway terracing over the Töölönlahti bay was completed in March 1861. For water traffic, two underpass bridges were built vaulted from stone. The larger underpass bridge had a size of 7 cubits (10 ft 6 in/3.20 m) and the smaller one had a size of 3 cubits (4 ft 6 in/1.37 m). The rails for the railway tracks were bought from the United Kingdom, and they arrived by steamship into the South Harbour in November 1857.

=== Helsinki's first station ===
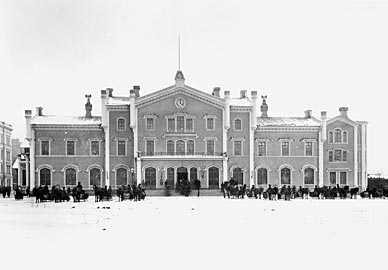
Helsinki's first railway station building.

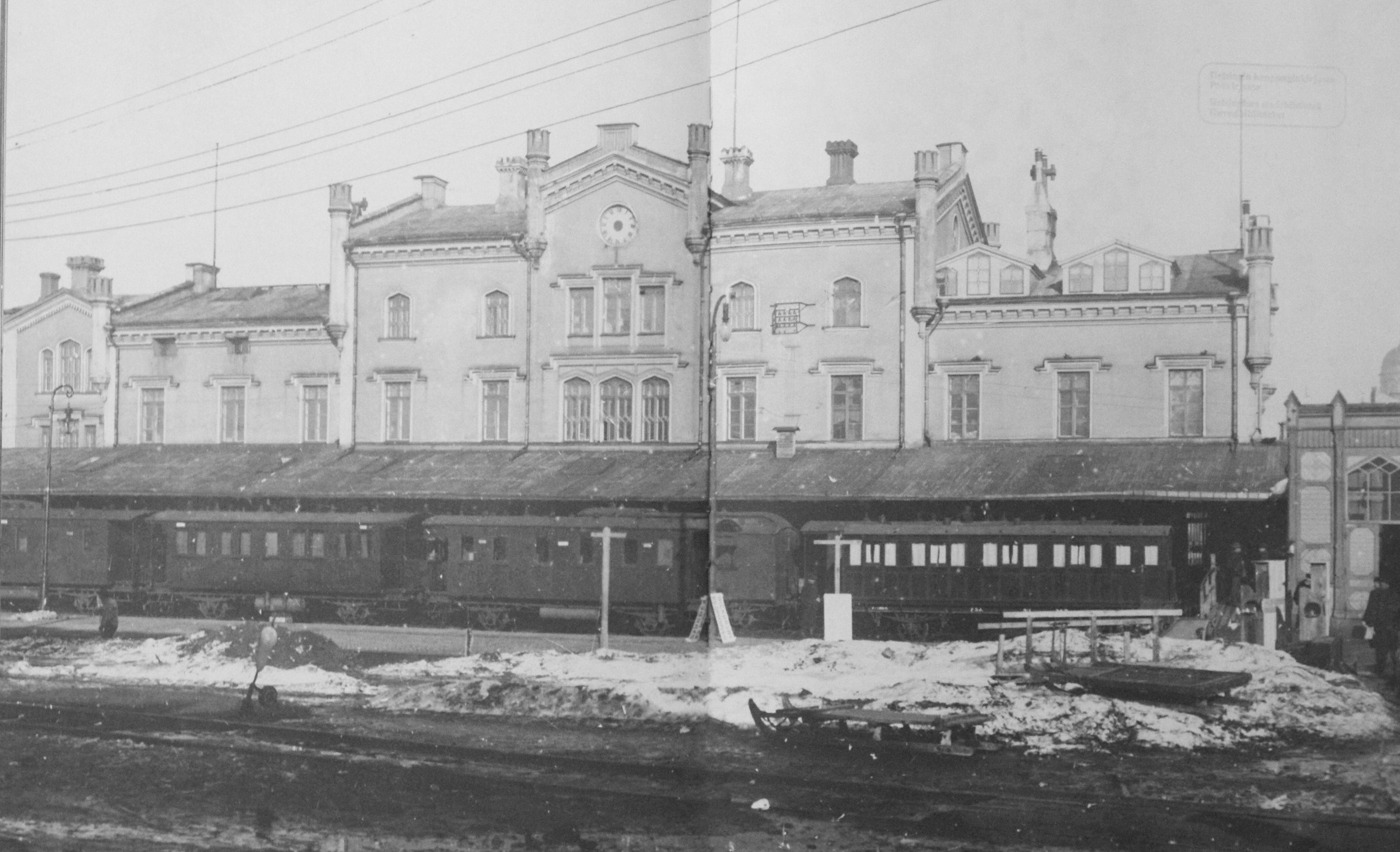
The station viewed from the tracks. The tracks were covered with a wooden shelter.

Helsinki's first railway station was built in 1862 to accommodate trains on the Helsinki–Hämeenlinna line, päärata. The station's plans were drawn by Swedish architect Carl Albert Edelfelt.

According to the original plans, all station buildings along the Helsinki-Hämeenlinna line should have been built from wood. However, there soon came wishes that the station building in the capital should be built from a more valuable material. Railway construction was new to Finland, and thus there were no existing models for new station buildings. So the provincial architect of Tavastia, Carl Albert Edelfelt, was requested for plans for various alternatives, which were presented in October 1859.

The cost estimate for a smaller one-floor building was about 27 thousand roubles and that for a larger two-floor building was about 40 thousand roubles. A wooden station building would only have cost 18 thousand roubles. These estimates did not include the cost for pile-driving the foundation, which was high at the muddy shore of the Kluuvinlahti bay.

Commercial counsellor Henrik Borgström and chief director von Born supported the construction of the smallest possible wooden building as a temporary station building, as passenger numbers would be fairly small until the railway was continued further north from Hämeenlinna. Also the possible danger of fire at the station was estimated to be fairly low, as the majority of the city's population was not located near the station. Chief director Claes Wilhelm Gyldén and governor Samuel Henrik Antell supported the largest building and proposed that the station should be constructed as large enough and permanent right from the start. Also, the fire safety of a station building built from stone would be much better than that of a wooden building. A small stone building was seen as too small, as the station needed waiting halls and traffic spaces. In addition, the upper floor would have to host offices for the Finnish railway administration and apartments for station officials. In the end, the large stone station building was voted as the best alternative for the new station building.

Construction work on the 108-kilometre railway between Helsinki and Hämeenlinna started in 1858. The first station building in Helsinki was built in 1861, but it was only opened for traffic on 17 March 1862. At first, the station places along the railway were only named in Swedish. The Finnish name for the Helsinki railway station was made official in 1897.

The tracks at the station were located right next to the station building on the edge of Kaivokatu. A large wooden shelter was built over the platforms. Commuter passengers entered the trains directly through an iron gate from Kaivokatu and only long-distance passengers went through the station hall. The station building was located nearer the Kaivokatu street than the current station building. Its end pointed towards Kaivokatu and the main entrance was towards the Rautatientori square. All station buildings designed by Edelfelt were of a simple side station building type, including the Helsinki railway station, even though it was located at the terminus of the railway. A cargo warehouse was built to the north of the station building, at the site of the eastern wing of the current station building. A railway yard about eight hectares in area was built at the station area, with engine stables and machinery yards. This railway yard was located to the west of the railway tracks, approximately at the end of the western wing of the current station building. The engine stables could seat a total of 12 engines at a time.

==== Exterior ====
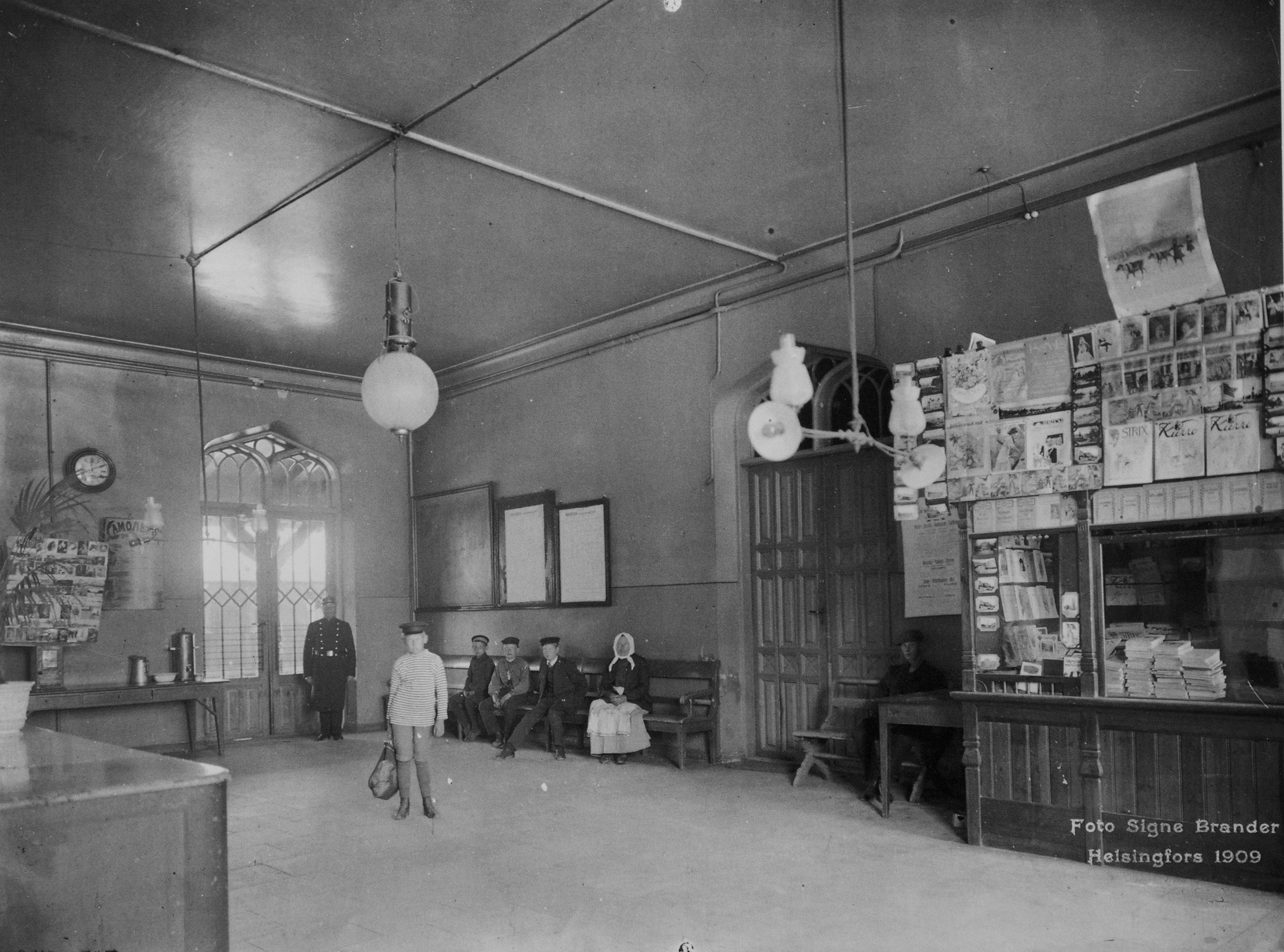
The third class waiting hall at the old railway station in Helsinki in 1909. Photograph by Signe Brander.

In the first designs the original Helsinki railway station had two floors and an octagonal clock tower at its northern end. However, the station was actually built with three floors and no clock tower. Architecturally, it was a mix of Gothic Revival architecture and Renaissance Revival architecture, which were among the styles commonly used for other railway stations in Europe at the time.

The first railway station in Helsinki was a sort of romantic picturesque manor, whose small size and simple appearance was also an act of honouring the emperor and Saint Petersburg. The Tudor-style brick and plaster station building was clad in natural stone. In the original designs the station was to be clad in brick, but in August 1860 plaster was added to the exterior to better withstand the weather. In the station facade, Renaissance Revival architecture showed in the ledges between the floors and in the windows grouping into axles. Gothic Revival architecture shoed in the tower aisles, corner towers on the roof and Tudor-style arches at the windows and doors.

It has been estimated that Edelfelt gained inspiration to the Helsinki railway station from his visit to the United Kingdom, from the architecture of Carl Axel Setterberg in Vaasa and from the Petergof railway station in Russia designed by Nicholas Benois, with many features in common with the Helsinki railway station.

==== Interior ====
The entrance to the Helsinki railway station was at the middle of the building, and opposite it were the baggage office, ticket sales and other station facilities.

Unlike today, spaces at stations and in trains were divided by social class, and so stations had separate waiting halls and restaurants for the first, second and third classes. The waiting halls and restaurants were located at both ends of the ground floor of the building.

The southern end of the building hosted the first and second class waiting halls, while the northern end hosted the waiting hall for the third class. Both waiting halls were attached to their own class-specific restaurants. The station had no central hall, instead passengers had to go around through the waiting halls to reach the platforms.

The ground floor also hosted railway station offices, an official room, a lamp room and a women's toilet. The second floor hosted the residences of the railway chief, the station chief and the administrative officers. The third floor hosted the residences of the caretaker and the engineer mechanic. The third floor also hosted storage space. Unlike other railway stations in Finland, the Helsinki railway station had gas lighting, as the city's first gas works had recently been built right next to the station, at the place of the current Postitalo main post office building.

==== Events ====
The first train from Helsinki to Hämeenlinna left on 31 January 1862. Regular train traffic started on 17 March 1862. According to schedule, a passenger train left from Helsinki to Hämeenlinna every Monday, Wednesday and Friday at 8 o'clock in the morning. Trains on return trips left for Helsinki every Tuesday, Thursday and Saturday at 7 o'clock in the morning. Already in October 1862 the schedule was changed to daily trips in both directions. A total of 27,241 train tickets were sold at the Helsinki railway station in 1863, and a total of 23,977 tickets were sold at other stations for trips to Helsinki.

The Diet of Finland was held for the first time in 1863, with emperor Alexander II of Russia attending. The city of Helsinki did not have a large enough space to host the event, so it was held at the station hall of the railway station. A temporary floor was built over the tracks and the roof was covered with floral vines. The swamp, unfit for public display, had been hidden under a birch bark mat. A couple of thousand invited guests attended the event.

The northern part of the Kluuvinlahti bay, to the west of the railway track, was filled in at the end of the 19th century to make space for the railway yard and the warehouses. The Helsinki harbour rail southward of the Helsinki railway station was built in 1894, and the VR warehouses were built in 1899.

The shore of the Kluuvinlahti bay had always been a cheap and disliked area. The construction of the railway station at the area greatly increased the value of the area and led to an immense construction boom in the entire city of Helsinki, lasting from the 1880s to the 1920s. Businessmen bought lots at the former shores of the Kluuvinlahti bay along the Helsinki Railway Square and the Mikonkatu street.

=== Helsinki's second station ===
==== Design ====
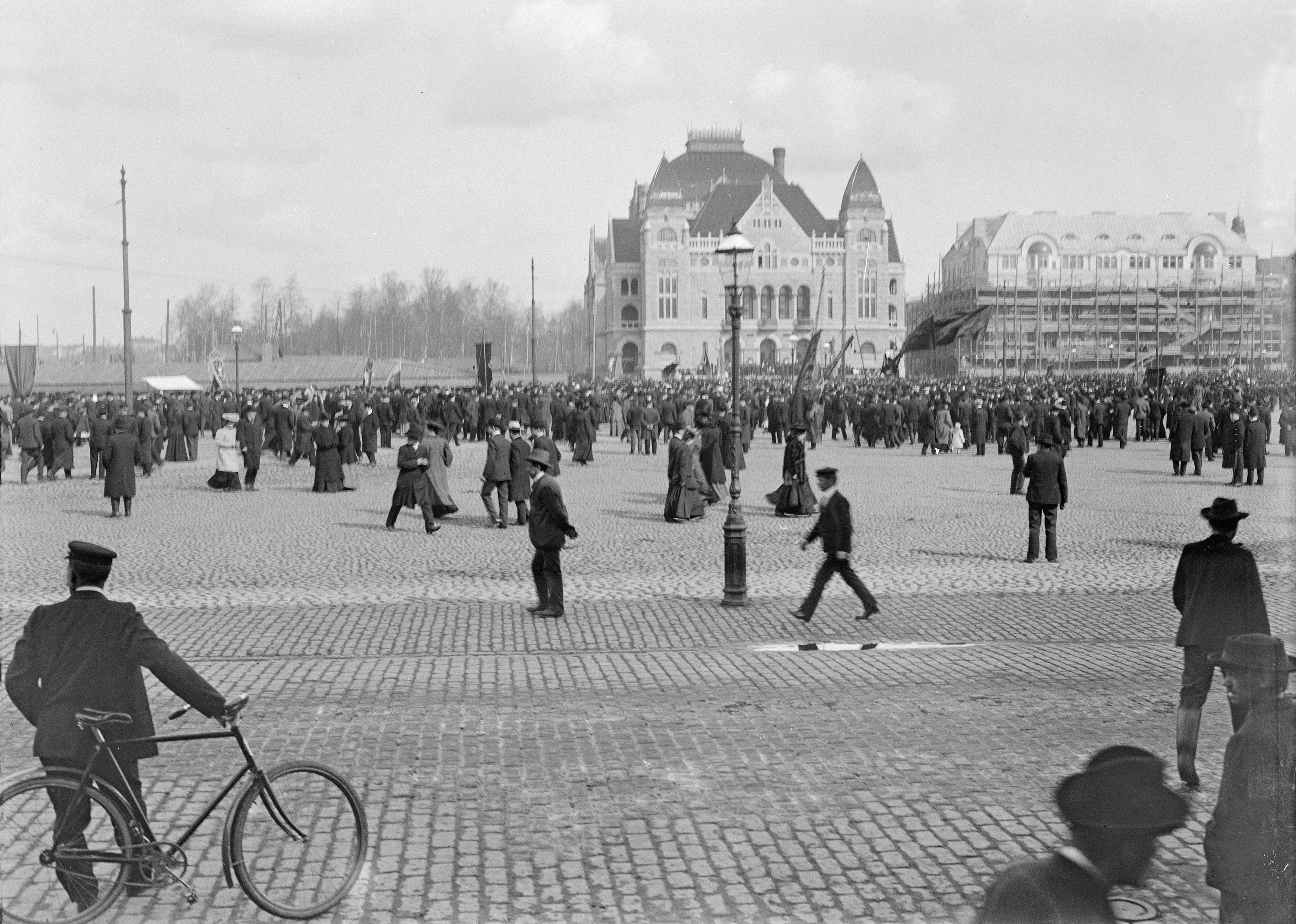
Gustaf Sandberg: The Rautatientori square in the early 1900s.

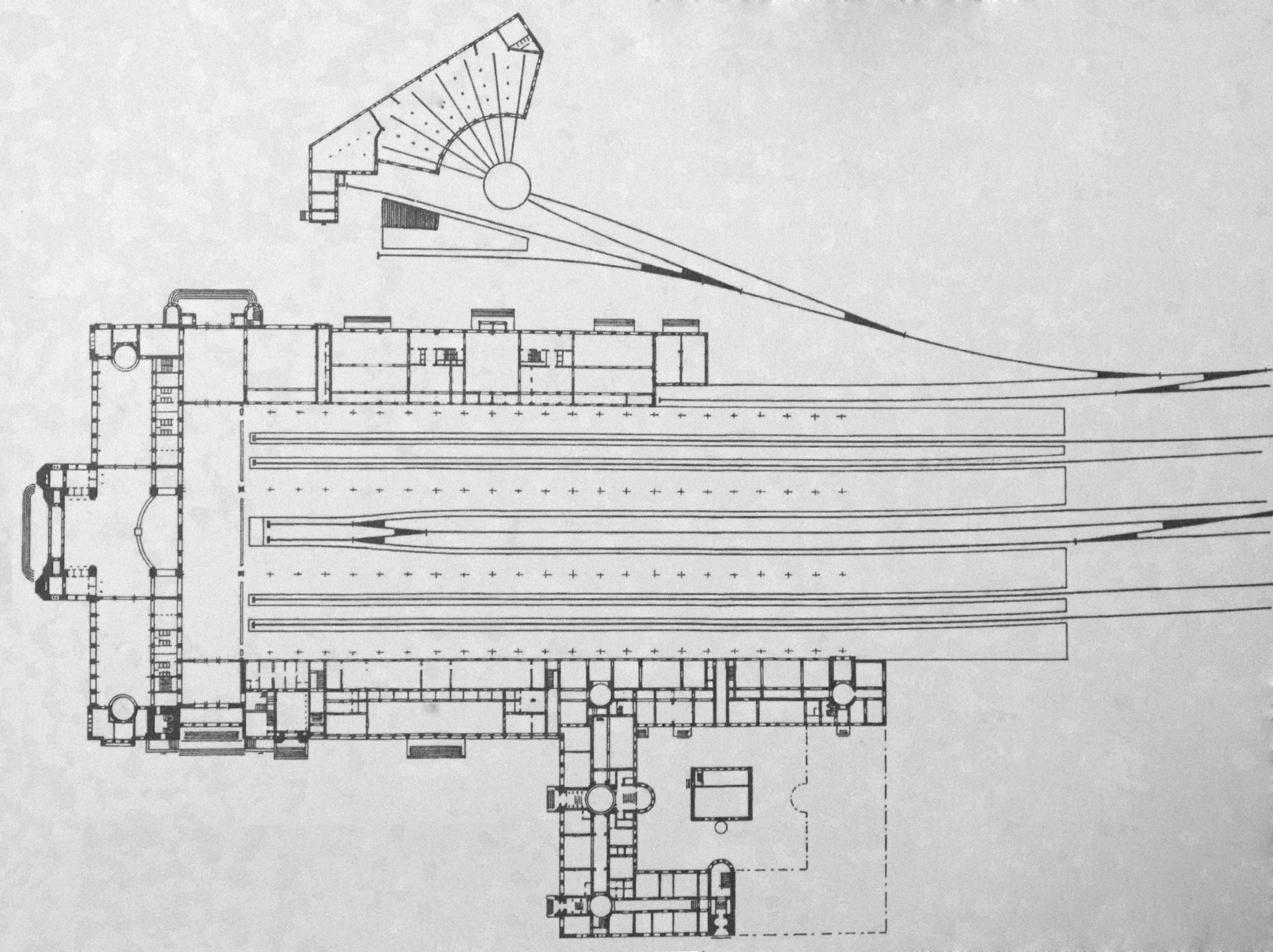
The floor plan of the new Helsinki railway station in the early 1900s.

Helsinki's first railway station had been measured to a small capital city with about 20 thousand inhabitants in the early 1860s. Urbanisation of Helsinki in the late 19th century brought along many changes. Between the 1860s and the 1900s the population of the city grew by almost 70 thousand people. Railway traffic at the Helsinki railway station increased, and the need for space by the railway administration also increased. As the popularity of railways grew, the original station turned out to be too small.

The railway administration started designing a new station building in Helsinki in 1895. Terminus stations such as the Helsinki station at the time were usually U-shaped buildings at the end of the tracks. Bruno Granholm, the architect of the railway administration, designed the administrative building, and the railway administration made the design of the new railway station. In Granholm's plan, the station building was already at the location and shape it ended up being built.

The railway administration had already ordered a design for the new station building from the German architect C. O. Gleim, who had won the design contests for the Stockholm Central Station and the Gothenburg Central Station in 1898. The railway administration originally intended to design the new Helsinki railway station unnoticed, without holding an open design contest.

A contest was organised in 1902 with the intention of producing plans for a new station. The contest sought to attract the attention of the railway workers to the difficult design task and to the architects capable of such a task. It also encouraged the railway administration to hold an open design contest for the new railway station in Helsinki.

The contest did not lead to practical actions, but because of the discussion it caused and the activity of the Finnish Architecture Club, the railway administration decided to hold a new design contest for the facades of the new Helsinki railway station and the administrative building of the railway administration.

The railway administration had designed the floor plan of the new railway station as a U-shaped building surrounding the railway tracks. The contestants received a floor plan designed by architect Bruno Granholm about the station building as well as the office and administrative wing attached to it. The floor plan bore a close resemblance to that of the 1888 Frankfurt Hauptbahnhof, which the contents were already familiar with. The facade of the station building was defined to be built of natural stone, and that of the administrative building of plastering with a conservative amount of natural stone. There would be a large central hall at the centre of the station, in connection to the main entrance. The main entrance had to face the Kaivokatu street. The other entrances were at the end of the perpendicular platform at the end of the tracks at the Rautatientori square and at the western end of the station. The tracks were required to be covered with a roof made of steel, with a cut of it provided as an attachment to the contest.

The design contest was judged by architects Sebastian Gripenberg, Hugo Lindberg and Gustaf Nyström, as well as the main director of the railway administration, August Granfelt. The contest was held a couple of years after the design contest of the National Museum of Finland, and it attracted a great deal of attention and interest. The new construction art of the National Museum was seen as romantic, picturesque and as nationally Finnish as possible. This very Finnish design style caused a lot of discussion, and there was desire to try it on the railway station too, without thinking whether the museum and the station would have required different symbolic forms.

The contest received 21 entries. All entries except that by Sigurd Frosterus were of a national romantic style. They had heavy roofs and low walls, the doors and windows were small, and there were lots of towers. All of the entries had an arched window on the main facade at the central hall. All entries featured a tall tower, which the floor plan did not require, but did allow. Sigurd Frosterus's facade design Eureka was an Art Nouveau building very different from the other entries, and the judges disliked his entry.

The contest was won by Eliel Saarinen's entry Bevingadt hjul på en jordglob – Maapallolla seisova siipipyörä ("A winged wheel standing on a globe"), with a pure national romanticist design, with sturdy walls, eight bears, one tall sharp-pointed tower and numerous smaller towers, as well as a beautifully drawn stone portal to the main platform. Its appearance bore a close resemblance to the facade of the National Museum, which did not please all of the architects.

Architects Sigurd Frosterus and Gustaf Strengell thought Saarinen's entry was old-fashioned and demanded sense and rationality to the architecture of the railway station. According to them, the station symbolised modern times, which had nothing to do with the medieval design fashion. The design sparked off a vigorous debate about the architecture of major public buildings, with demands for a modern, rational style. The debate went so far that even cartoons mocking the new railway station appeared in magazines. These cartoons showed the entire station having changed to look more like a medieval stone church than a popular railway station. The bear sculptures had grown, and one of them had jumped down onto the street to chase people. As was typical for Saarinen, he did not participate in the public debate at any point.

Saarinen later made a complete change to the architecture of the railway station. He moved his attention from American or British examples towards German ones and travelled by train all over Europe with his recently wed wife. After coming back home to Finland in 1904 he abandoned romanticism altogether and re-designed the station completely, with a more rational design. The former saddle roof was replaced with a gambrel roof, the semicircular window on the main facade had grown and the entrance hall with the bear statues was removed. The new design was finished in 1909 and the new station building was opened in 1919.

Later the floor plan of the station building was freed from the model specified by the railway administration and was made more clear for the purpose of use by large masses of people. This allowed the central hall of the station to be widened.

Saarinen developed his design for many years and made numerous drawings of the facade of the railway station building. The final solutions for making the station building more rational were born gradually. The station's facade bears a close resemblance to that of the 1913 Vyborg railway station, designed by the architecture bureau of Saarinen and Herman Gesellius. The structures and material strength calculations of the building were handled by graduate engineer Jalmari Castrén. The central heating and air conditioning in the building were designed by the Danish engineer A. C. Karsten. The electrical plans were made in the electricity technical office of the machine department of the railway administration, with machine engineers Karl Strömberg and Karl Karsten serving as their designers.

==== Construction ====
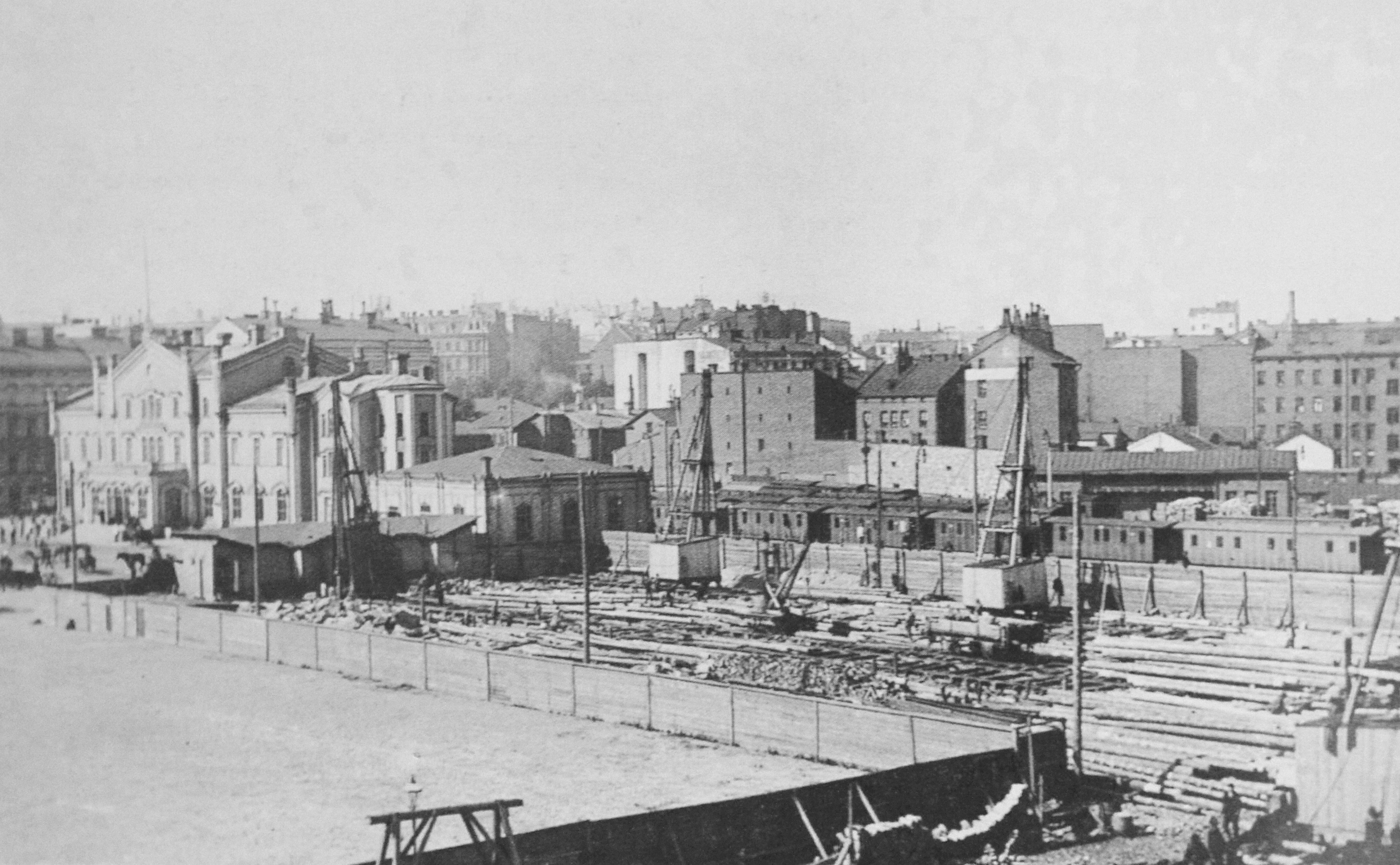
Pile-driving work at the Helsinki railway station in 1906.

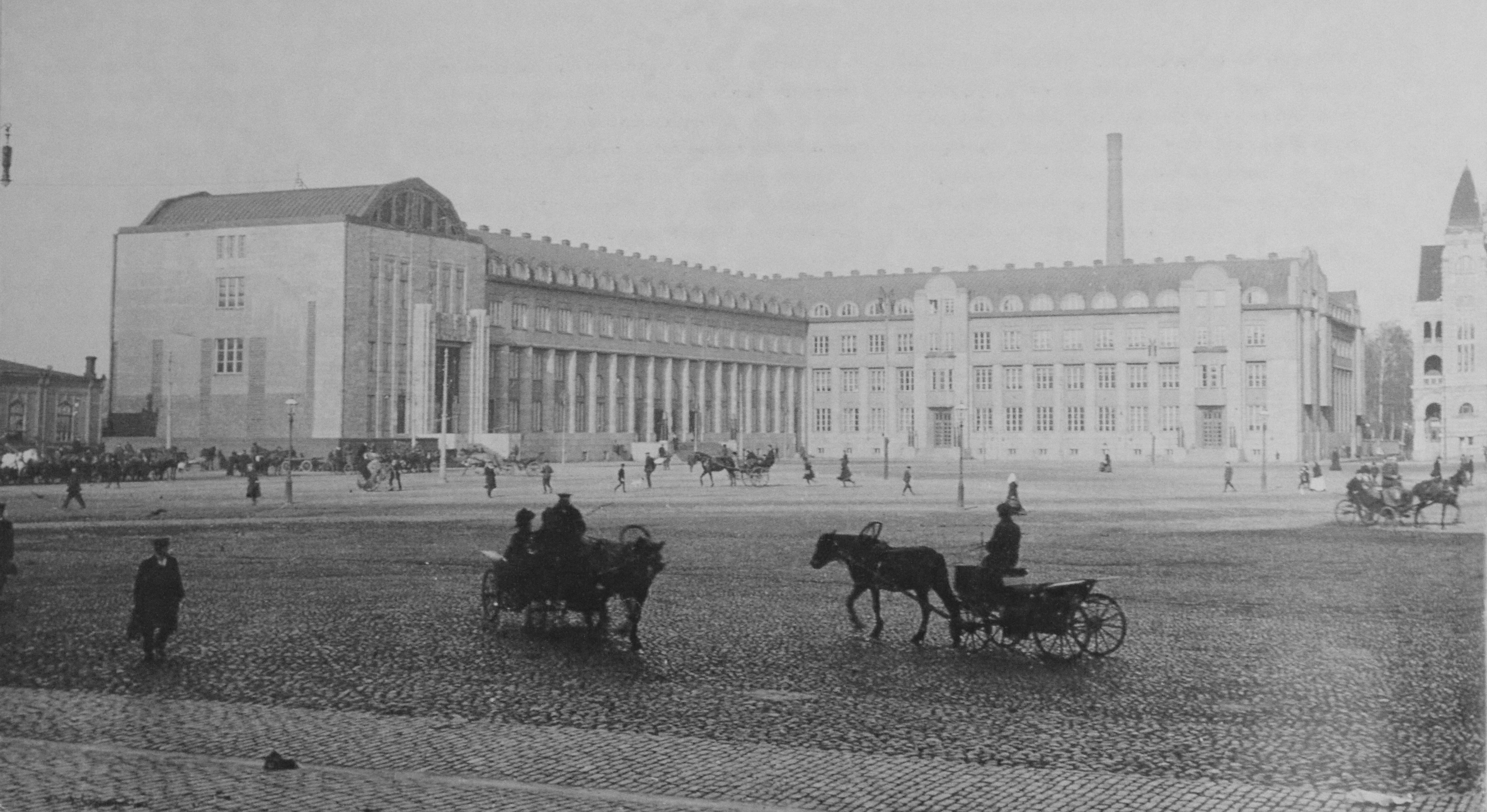
The administrative building was completed in July 1909.

The administrative building of the railway administration was accepted in June 1905, and construction started in December 1905. A total of 20 thousand cubic metres of floors for the building were cast from iron-reinforced concrete, which is thought to have been a new record in Finland at the time. The four-floor administrative building was completed in June 1909, and after this the officials of the railway administration moved to this building, the largest office building in the country at the time, decorated according to Eliel Saarinen's plans.

The final plans for the station building were accepted in 1911. In the next year, the two-floor northern end of the old station building was dismantled and pile-driving of the new station building was started.

The new station building, built at the site of the former Kluuvinlahti bay, had to be driven deep into the ground onto wooden piles. The bedrock at the site is at a depth of 20 to 30 metres. The wooden piles were mostly driven into the ground with the strength of 30 men, but steam-powered pile drivers were also used in the construction, as well as electric pile drivers, probably for the first time in Finland. The pile-driving work employed about 300 people. About ten thousand wooden piles were driven into the structure of the station building. Only the supportive walls of the clock tower were driven into the bedrock, at a depth of eleven metres.

The plans for the western express cargo wing were accepted in summer 1912, and masonry and iron concrete work was started in the next summer. At the end of the year, the walls were almost fully masoned, and the granite lining and concrete vaults were also completed.

The halls received monumental concrete vaults, clearly reflecting into the shape of the building. These vaults, utilising the Hennebique iron-reinforced concrete structure patented in France in 1892, were the largest iron-reinforced concrete structure commissioned by the state at the time. The main facade and the stone statues at the main entrance were made of red granite brought from Hanko.

==== World War I ====
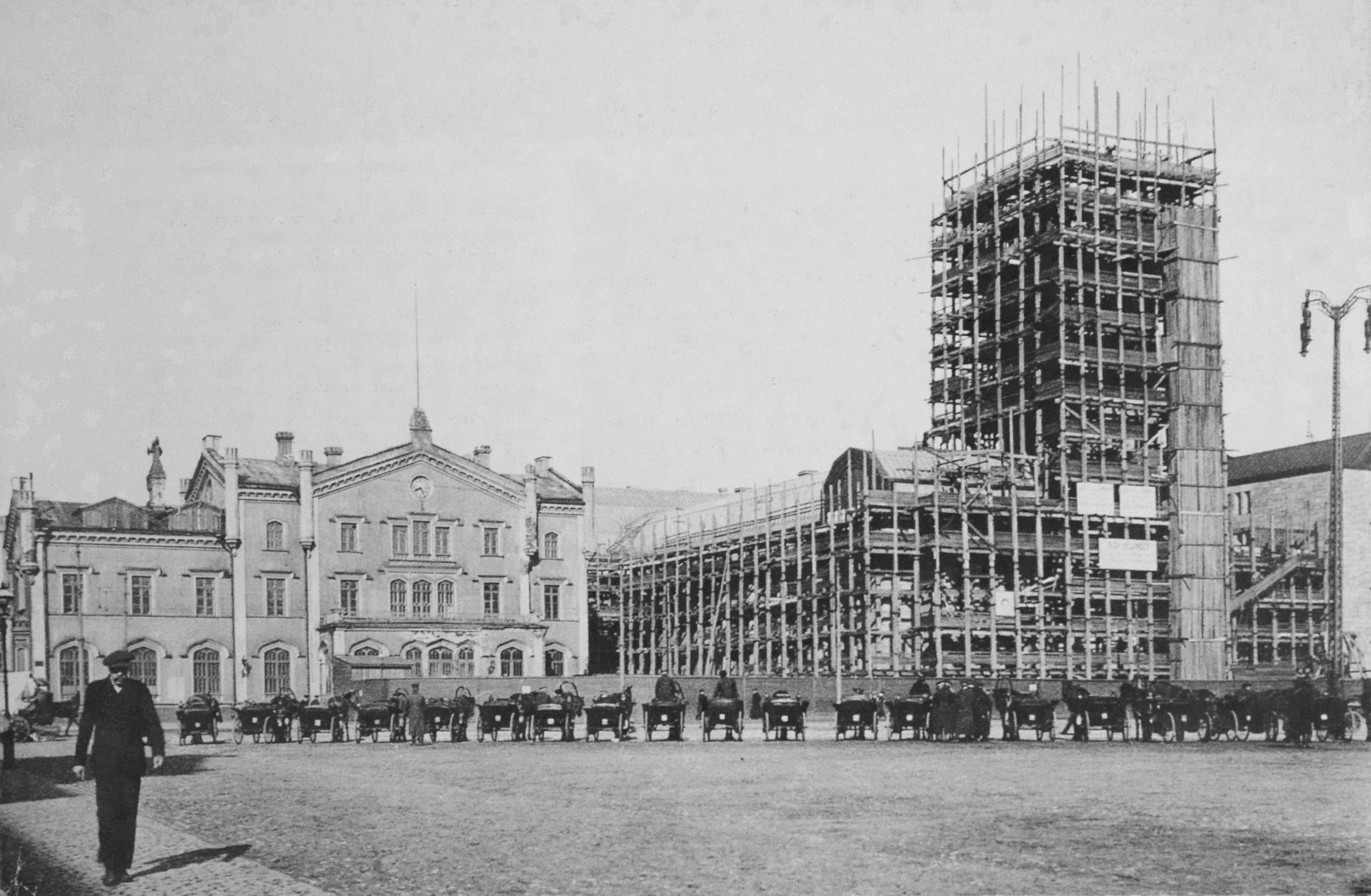
World War I caused construction of the new railway station in Helsinki to be paused. The scaffolding around the clock tower remained in place for five years until it was finally dismantled.

The construction of the station was delayed by dramatic times. World War I broke out in summer 1914, and Finland was declared in a state of war. The facade of the railway station was already almost complete at the time, but the war caused the construction to be paused for a period of five years. By orders of emperor Nicholas II of Russia, the station was converted into a military hospital for the Russian forces from 1915 to 1916. The halls could fit about a thousand patients. At the same time, a temporary departure platform was built at the Töölö railway yard, with trains for fortification employees leaving on the coastal track to Leppävaara and on the main track to Malmi.

The Finnish Civil War broke out after the Russian Revolution and Finland declared its full independence, with the Reds conquering the station in January 1918. The railway administration had to move to Vaasa, which was the capital of White Finland at the time. In April the Reds retreated from Helsinki to Vyborg, and with the senate's approval German troops conquered Helsinki. This allowed the railway administration to return to the Helsinki railway station and the train traffic to gradually resume operation.

==== Completion ====
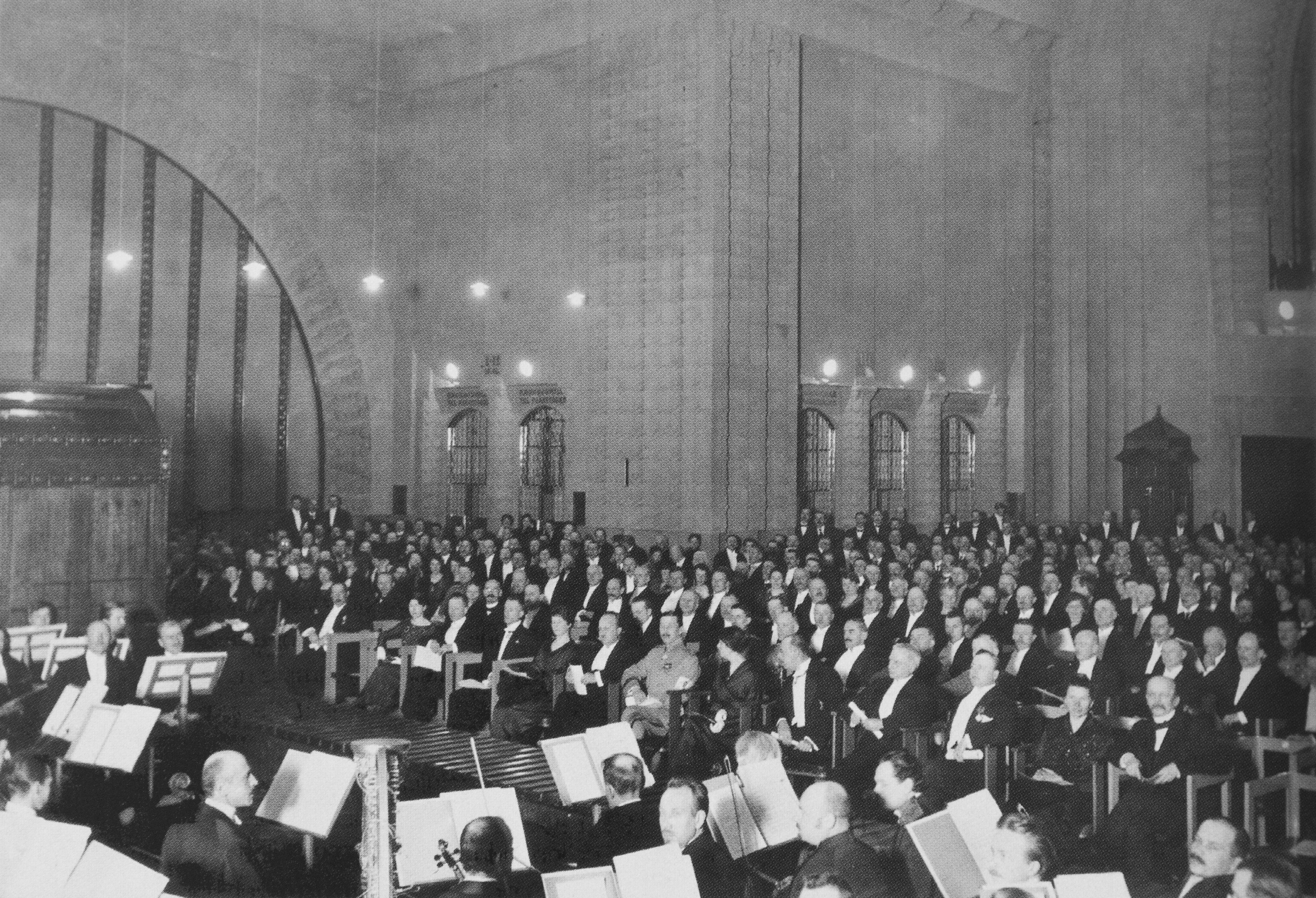
The inauguration ceremony of the Helsinki railway station.

After the Civil War had ended, the situation in the country was seen as so serious that the railway engineer Orrman was ordered to oversee the completion of the Helsinki railway station. The old station building remained in use until the new station building was completed after spending 12 years under construction. The badly deteriorated old station building, the scaffolding that had been around the clock tower for five years and the fence around the construction site were all dismantled in December 1918.

The new railway station was inaugurated on Wednesday 5 March 1919, still at an incomplete stage. The station, which was originally intended to serve as the western terminus station of the Empire of Russia, became the main railway station of independent Finland. A total of 15 years had passed since the design contest of the station, and the interior of the station building was still incomplete. The patriotic inauguration was opened by the city orchestra playing Finlandia conducted by Robert Kajanus. Guests at the inauguration included architect Eliel Saarinen and regent Carl Gustaf Emil Mannerheim.

The main platform at the end of the railway tracks was only covered according to the original plans made by the railway administration in 1925. In 1938, the administrative building in the western wing was expanded with a wing parallel to the Teatterikuja street according to the plans made by the railway administration.

=== World War II and bombing of Helsinki ===
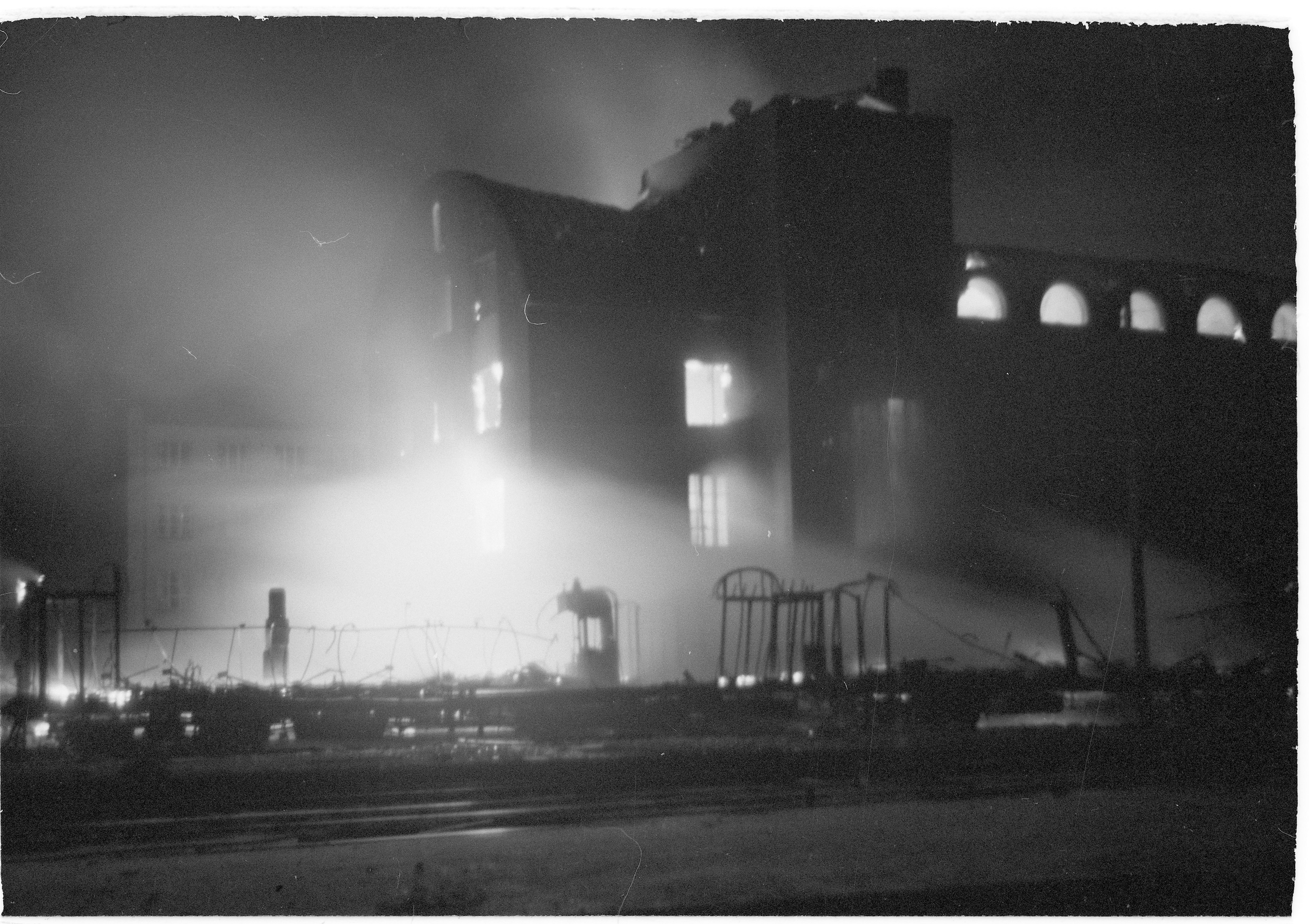
The Helsinki railway station on fire after the bombing of Helsinki in 1944.

During the Continuation War the station was damaged in several bombings, as it was always among the main bombing targets for the enemy. The station was first damaged already in the first large night bombing in August 1942.

The worst damage that the railway station suffered was at the end of the Continuation War in February 1944, when the Soviet Union engaged in the bombing of Helsinki. A total of 16,490 bombs were dropped on three nights. The first bombs to hit the city centre were dropped onto the railway station on 6 February 1944 at 19:22. More bombs fell later, when the railway administration building and the railway museum caught fire. Two of the bombs weighed at least a thousand kilograms. The area was also hit by tens of mine bombs and several incendiary bombs. The bombing started at the busiest time of departure of the night trains. Tens of people were injured and one person was killed by shrapnel caused by the bombs. In addition, the material damage to the station was immense.

=== Fire ===
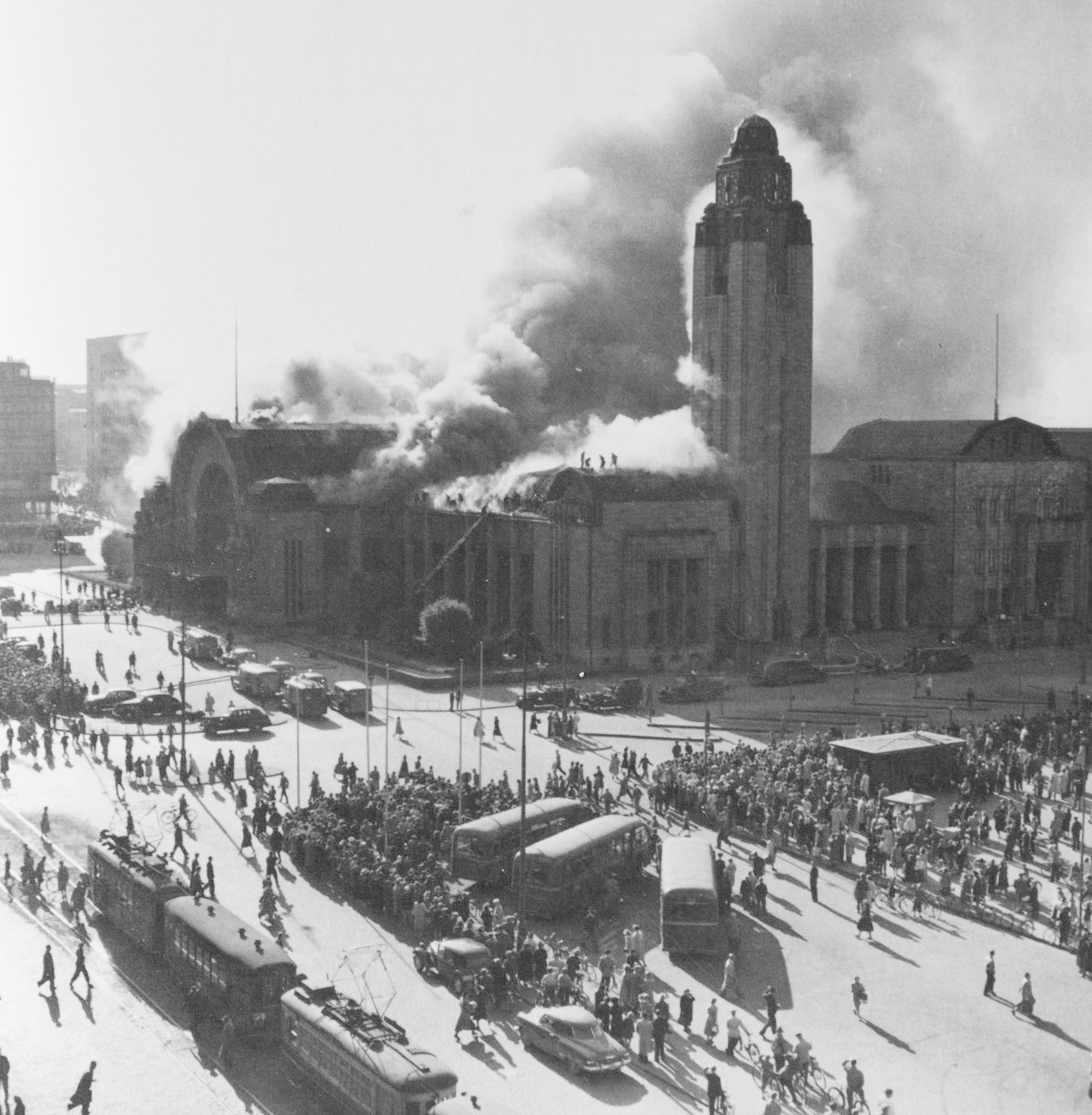
A devastating fire broke out at the Helsinki railway station on 14 June 1950.

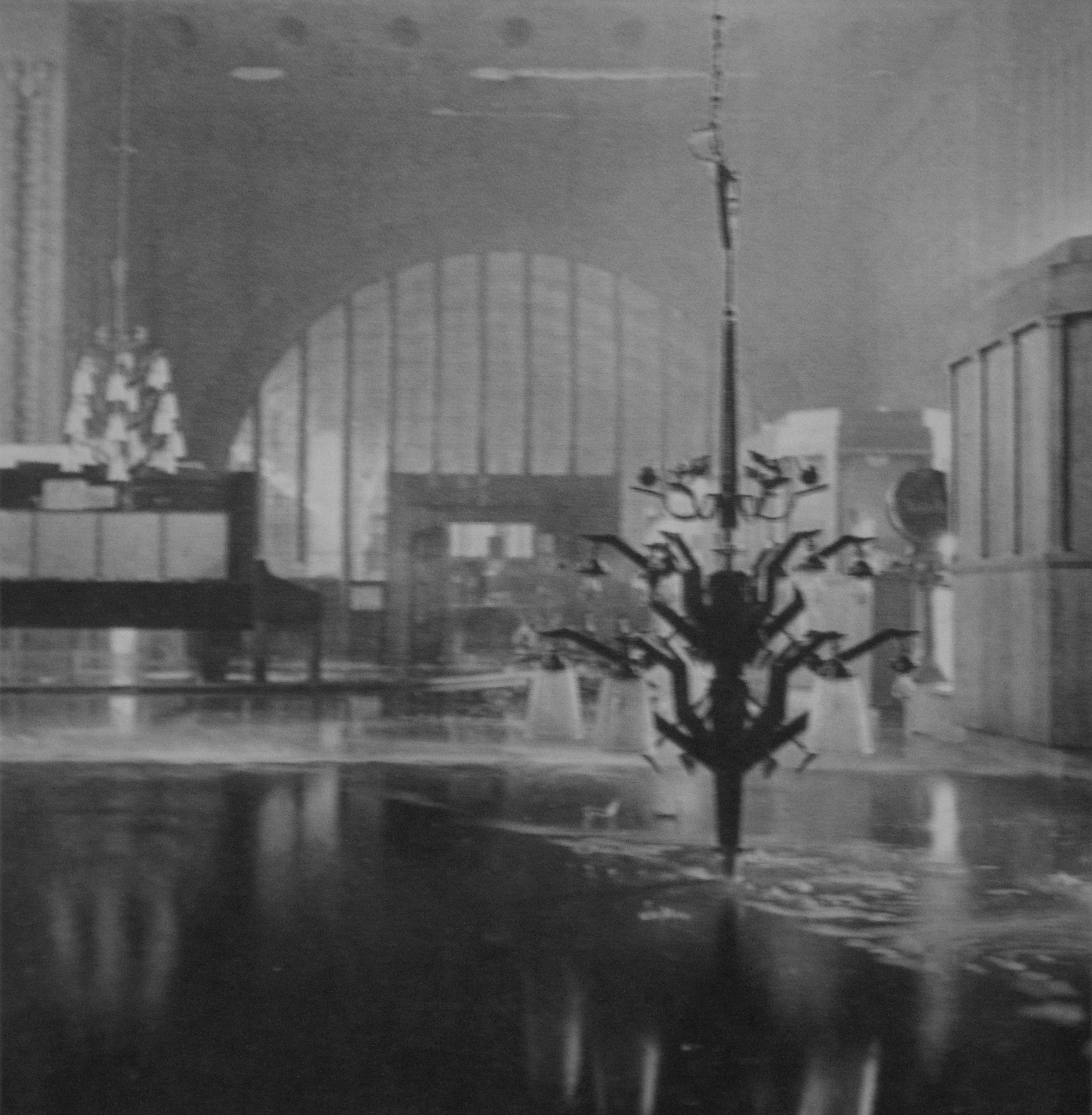
The heat caused by the fire melted the wires of the chandeliers, which fell down on the floor.

A large fire broke out at the Helsinki railway station on 14 June 1950. Because of the fire, a general alarm was given in Helsinki, and the entire force of the Helsinki fire brigade as well as auxiliary forces from nearby municipalities were sent to the site. Nineteen fire extinguishing units and about a hundred firemen took part in extinguishing the fire. Police patrols were also sent to the site as the tens of thousands of people present at the site ventured too close to the burning station building.

The fire had started from the elevator outside the second class restaurant. As the fire brigade arrived at the site, the attic between the restaurant and the main entrance was completely aflame. The fire spread through the attic from the station tower all the way to the railway museum in the western wing. The wooden roof at the end of the station platforms also caught fire and collapsed. The attic of the station, about 3,000 square metres in area, was destroyed in the fire.

The smoke cloud caused by the fire was so immense that according to Helsingin Sanomat it could be seen from as far away as Turku. During the entire fire, train traffic functioned normally or was only slightly late. Train departure points were moved about a hundred metres north from the normal departure points. Passengers were directed on and off the trains through the eastern wing of the station building.

No one was killed in the fire, but five firemen suffered slight smoke poisoning, and one fireman broke his hip after he fell through the roof onto the attic. 40 enlisted men participated in clearing out the damages of the fire. The heat caused by the fire melted the wires of the chandeliers, causing them to fall to the floor. After the extinguishing work, the underground floors of the station were flooded up to the ankles. The costs caused by the fire were estimated at about 30 million Finnish markka. The station building was not insured, so the state of Finland had to pay the costs caused by the fire in their entirety.

The cause for the rapid spread of the fire was the open attic of the station building, which had practically not been partitioned at all. The attic was entirely made of wood and was insulated by flammable straw. In addition, the roof structure was made out of the old copper roof, dismantling which was considerably slower than that of a steel roof.

The fire inspector of the Helsinki fire brigade had already addressed the construction style of the attic of the railway station endangering the fire safety of the building in 1939. The attic spaces of the station building were ordered to be divided with fire walls into separate sections. The attic, 600 square metres in area, was divided into sections after the fire to increase fire safety. During the repairs, the current closed and warm kiosk hall was built in place of the roof that had been destroyed in the fire.

A humorous mention of "Finland's fastest fire brigade" remains as an urban legend from the fire. During the fire, the fire brigade of the municipality of Joutseno, currently part of the rescue department of Southern Karelia, was at the Helsinki capital region to fetch a new fire engine. The firemen fetching the new fire engine decided to stop at the railway station for coffee and thus were the first fire brigade present when the fire broke out.

=== Renovations and expansions ===
==== 1950s ====
In the Olympic year 1952 a temporary passenger platform was constructed at the cargo station in Töölö. This temporary train stop was named Helsinki-Töölö. During the Olympics, it also served as the departure for express trains to Turku via the Porkkala Naval Base, with the train windows covered when passing the naval base. From 1955 to 1957 the exit hall towards the Rautatientori square was divided into two with an intermediary floor and a so-called Olympic Hall was built into the top floor, which had been supposed to be built already in the Olympic year according to the original plans. At the same time, seven new floors were built into the clock tower for the use of the kitchen department, and storage and social spaces were built in the underground floors that had been almost completely unused. Ticket sales were opened in the former third class restaurant and waiting hall.

==== 1960s to 1990s ====
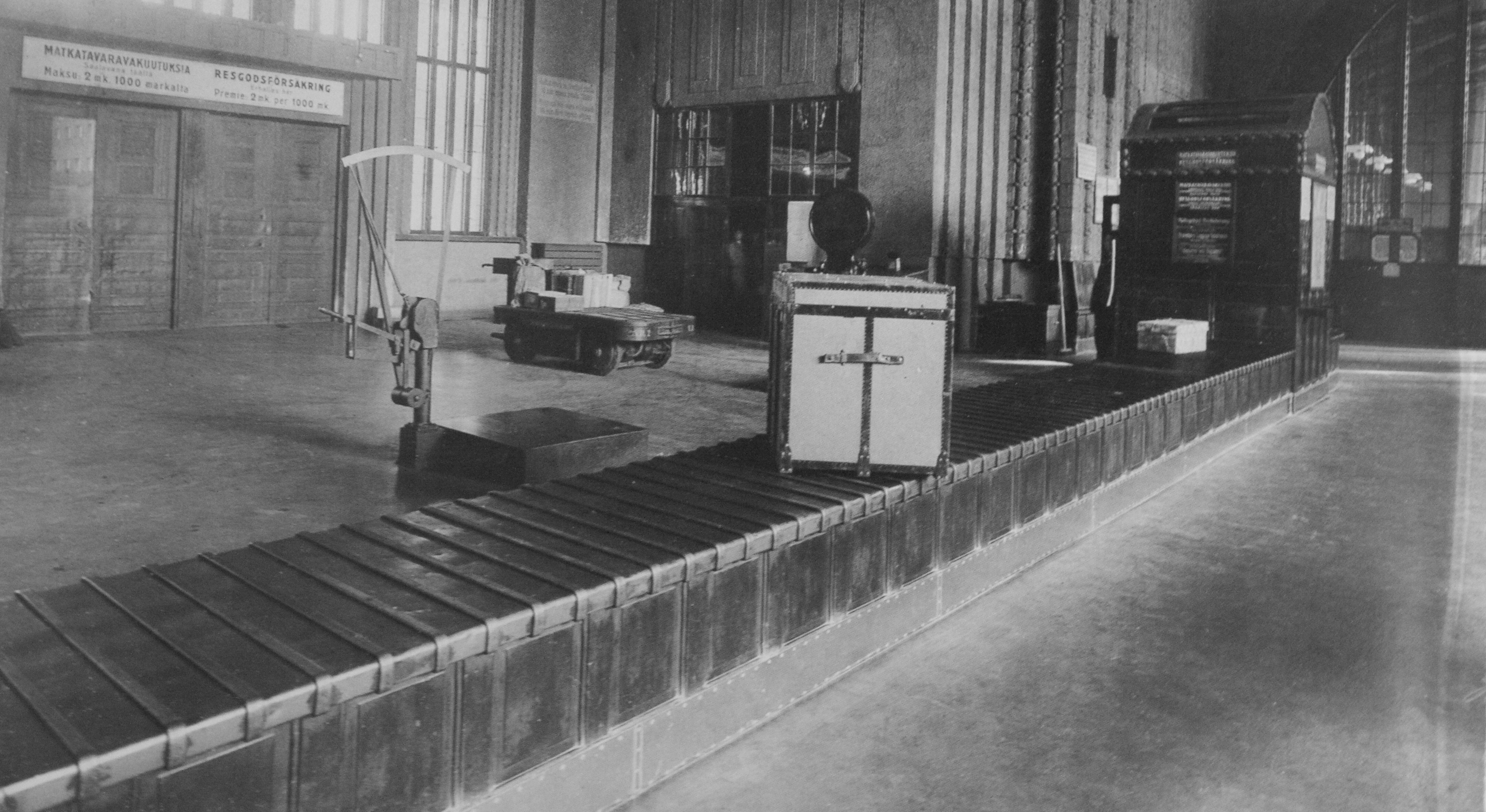
A photograph by Eric Sundström of arriving baggage at the Helsinki railway station in 1928, which was located at the central hall of the station for a long time. In 1979 arriving baggage moved to the western wing of the station, freeing the central hall for a public thoroughfare.

A station tunnel was built underneath Kaivokatu in 1967, with stairs leading to the tunnel from the central hall of the station. Electric train traffic started at the Helsinki railway station on 26 January 1969.

From 1978 to 1979, spaces for arriving baggage were built into the underground floor of the western wings, freeing the space in the central hall for a public thoroughfare. The last scheduled train with a steam locomotive left Helsinki on 31 December 1970. Regular passenger train traffic with Diesel-powered locomotives ended on 11 August 1996. Today all trains at the Helsinki railway station use electric power.

The kiosks at the kiosk hall were renovated in the early 1980s according to plans by interior decoration architect Antti Nurmesniemi.

==== 2000s ====
The perpendicular underpass from the corner of the Kaisaniemi park to the corner of the Eliel Square at the end of the western wing of the station was built from 1999 to 2000. It was designed by architect Jarmo Maunula. The tunnel is 185 metres long and over seven metres wide. It connects to all tracks at the station with stairs and elevators. The walls are panelled, which helps in cleaning away graffiti and other defacements.

An underground parking garage with 480 places was built to the west of the station, in place of the former cargo railway yard, with the Eliel Square bus terminal on top of it. It was opened for use in October 2000. The new platform tracks 17 to 19 were taken into use in August 2000, when the tracks at the passenger station reached their current form.

For a long time, the Helsinki railway station was one of the few large railway stations in Europe where passengers boarded the trains under the open sky. The main tracks were supposed to be covered right from the start, but the glass roof was only built in 2001. A design contest was held for it, which was won by Esa Piironen's design in 1994. The glass roof cost about 56 million Finnish markka. The roof is about 165 metres long. It is made of painted steel topped with reinforced glass. There are gaps covered with 70 cm grids between the tracks to allow for rainwater to fall down onto the rubble below and to soak into the soil so that the wooden piles originally driven into the former Kluuvi swamp will not decompose. The covered space is partly heated. Its front end is heated by the exhaust pipes of the district heating in front of the main door.

The western wing was renovated into a commercial business centre in autumn 2003. The corridor surrounded by restaurants and business spaces leads from the main station hall to the end of the western wing, to the western platforms for commuter trains. At the same time, the retirement foundation of the VR Group commissioned a hotel and an office building to the northern edge of the Eliel Square, reaching over the platforms of the commuter trains. The building was designed by the architectural bureau Artto, Palo, Rossi & Tikka. It was built in 2003. The facade is made of glass, patinated copper and green granite.

On 5 June 2005 the station was divided into eleven separate traffic spots, named Helsinki asema, Helsinki Länsisatama, Pasila alapiha, Pasila asema, Pasila tavara, Helsinki Sörnäinen, Käpylä, Oulunkylä, Ilmala asema, Ilmala ratapiha and Helsinki Kivihaka.

The station was named Helsinki Central Station on 7 June 2010. The previous name was Helsinki Station.

The timetable displays at the station were completely renovated in November 2015. The old LCDs were replaced with fully modifiable TFT displays.

A new perpendicular underpass tunnel named Kaisantunneli, 220 metres long and four metres wide, leading from the Kaisaniemi park to Töölönlahdenkatu, is under construction and scheduled to be completed in 2023. This pedestrian tunnel will decrease bicycle traffic at the Eliel Square and on the Kaivokatu street and will make access to the station platforms easier.

=== Modern times ===
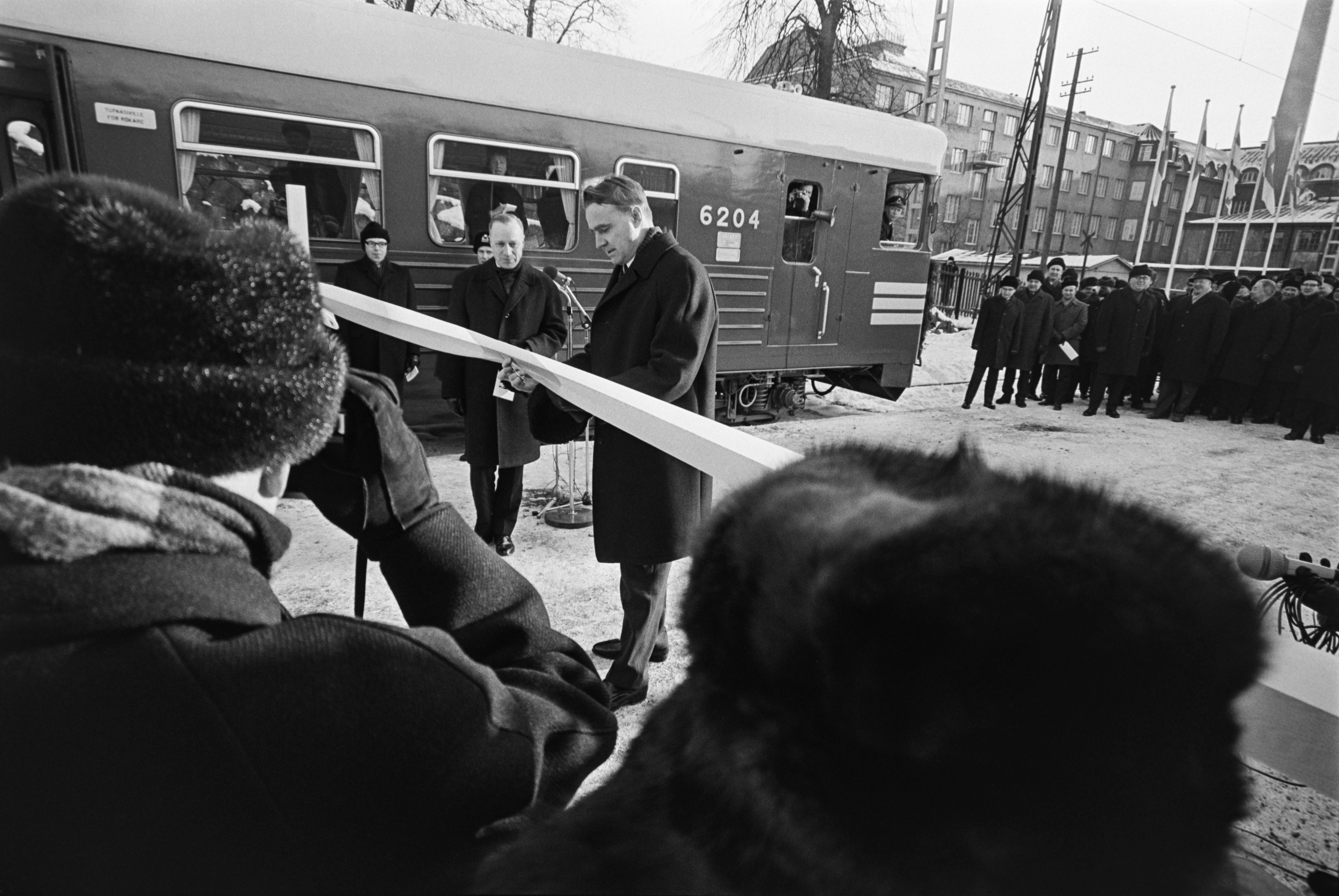
The opening ceremony of the first electric railway line at Helsinki railway station in 24.1.1969. The Prime Minister of Finland, Mauno Koivisto cutting the ceremony ribbon. The train Sm1 opened the first line that operated between Helsinki and Kirkkonummi

In the 1960s, the underground Asematunneli pedestrian underpass and underground shopping centre complex was built south of the station. The first surveillance cameras in the station hall were installed in the spring of 1968.

The first electric train arrived at the station on 13 January 1969. After testing, regular electric train traffic was started between Helsinki and Kirkkonummi on 26 January 1969.

The Rautatientori metro station, connected to the railway station via Asematunneli, was built part of the Helsinki Metro construction work. It was one of the original metro stations, as it was opened in 1982.

In 2000, a glass roof, which had already been in the original drawings by Eliel Saarinen, was built over the railway station's central platforms, although to a new design. In 2003, the shopping wing Kauppakuja was opened along with a hotel.

The area between the Parliament House and the station contained the VR warehouses, a rail-freight complex. Its original use had long been discontinued in 2006, when it was torn down to make space for the Helsinki Music Centre.

One of the tracks branching to the west just before the central station bypassed the warehouses. It was a freight route, the Helsinki harbour rail, which passed through the inner west side of the city, all the way around the Helsinki peninsula to Katajanokka. Later most of it was closed, and the track only led to the West Harbour. This last section was discontinued in 2009, when sea freight operations were moved to the new Vuosaari Harbour from old harbours near the city centre. Its right-of-way was converted into a pedestrian and bicycle route.

On 7 June 2010, the station was officially renamed Helsingin päärautatieasema-Helsingfors centralstation (Helsinki main, or central, railway station, in Finnish and Swedish), replacing the previous official name Helsingin rautatieasema-Helsingfors järnvägsstation (Helsinki railway station). The Finnish transport bureau uses "Helsinki C" as a shorthand, and there were erroneous news reports that this shorthand would also be taken into official use. Turku Central Station was renamed in a similar manner.

== Architecture ==
Helsinki Central Station is one of Eliel Saarinen’s best-known works in Finland. It is architecturally and technically innovative and is one of the most prominent landmarks in the Helsinki city centre. It is also considered an important example of Finnish architecture.

Following its completion in 1914, the station attracted international attention and has subsequently been regarded as an important example of railway station architecture. The German architecture press described it as the most beautiful railway station in the world. The station building also served as an inspiration for the design of the Singapore railway station.

The station building has stood the test of time well, and its architecture still attracts attention in the 21st century. The building was chosen as one of the ten most beautiful railway stations in the world in 2012 by the American website Flavorwire.com and the tourist guide publisher Lonely Planet, as well as by the BBC in 2014.

In addition to the National Museum of Finland, the Helsinki Central Station was one of the largest construction projects by the Finnish state in the early 20th century. Both buildings have been involved in disputes among the architectural community. The final design of the station has been said to bear a close resemblance to Sigurd Frosterus's entry "Eureka". Both designs have similar vaults, but Saarinen's design does not include any of the features typical for Frosterus's concrete architecture. Saarinen was inspired by German architecture. The station has drawn inspiration from the German Karlsruhe Hauptbahnhof and from the Swiss Basel Badischer Bahnhof.

=== Facade ===
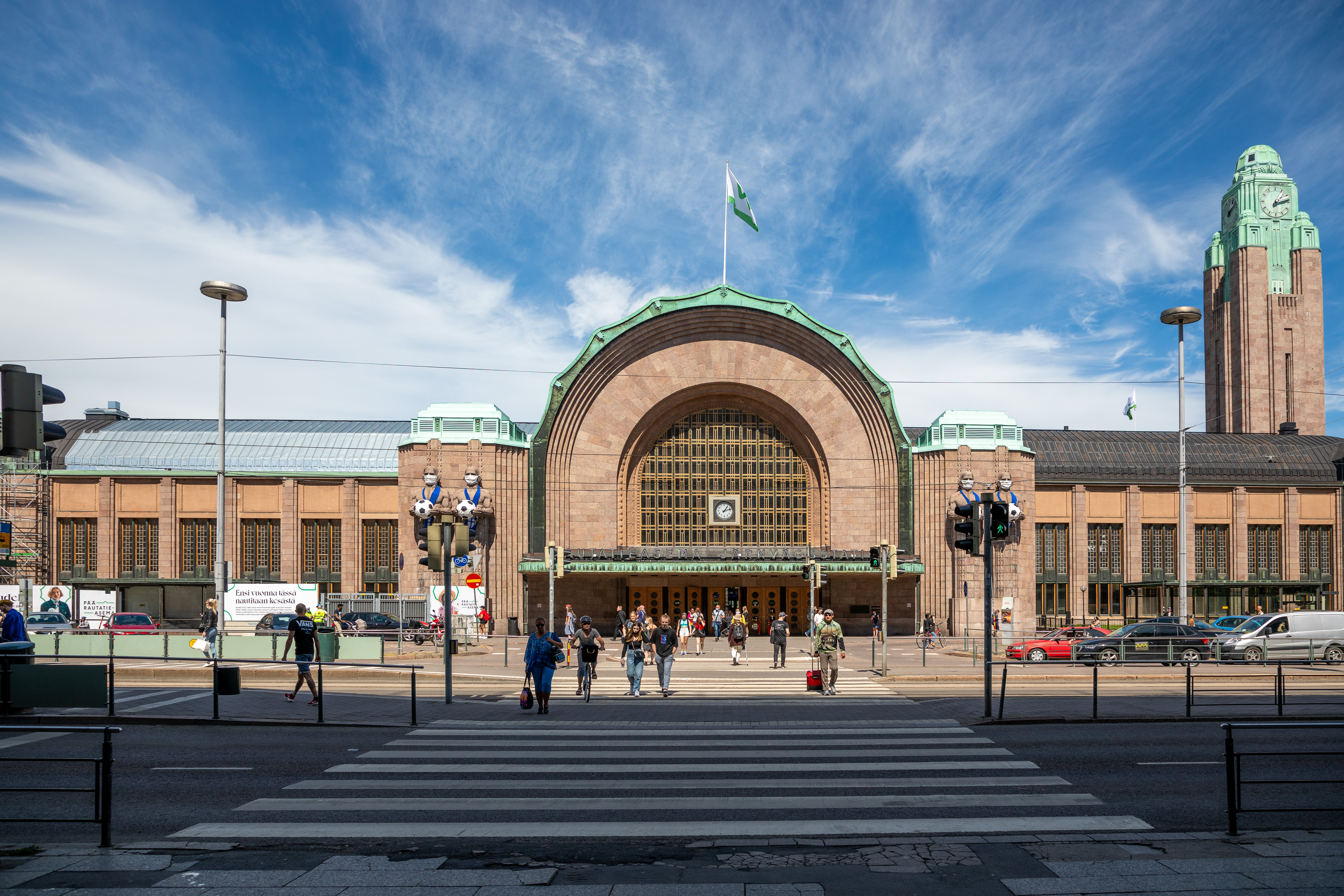
Main façade and main entrance of the station.

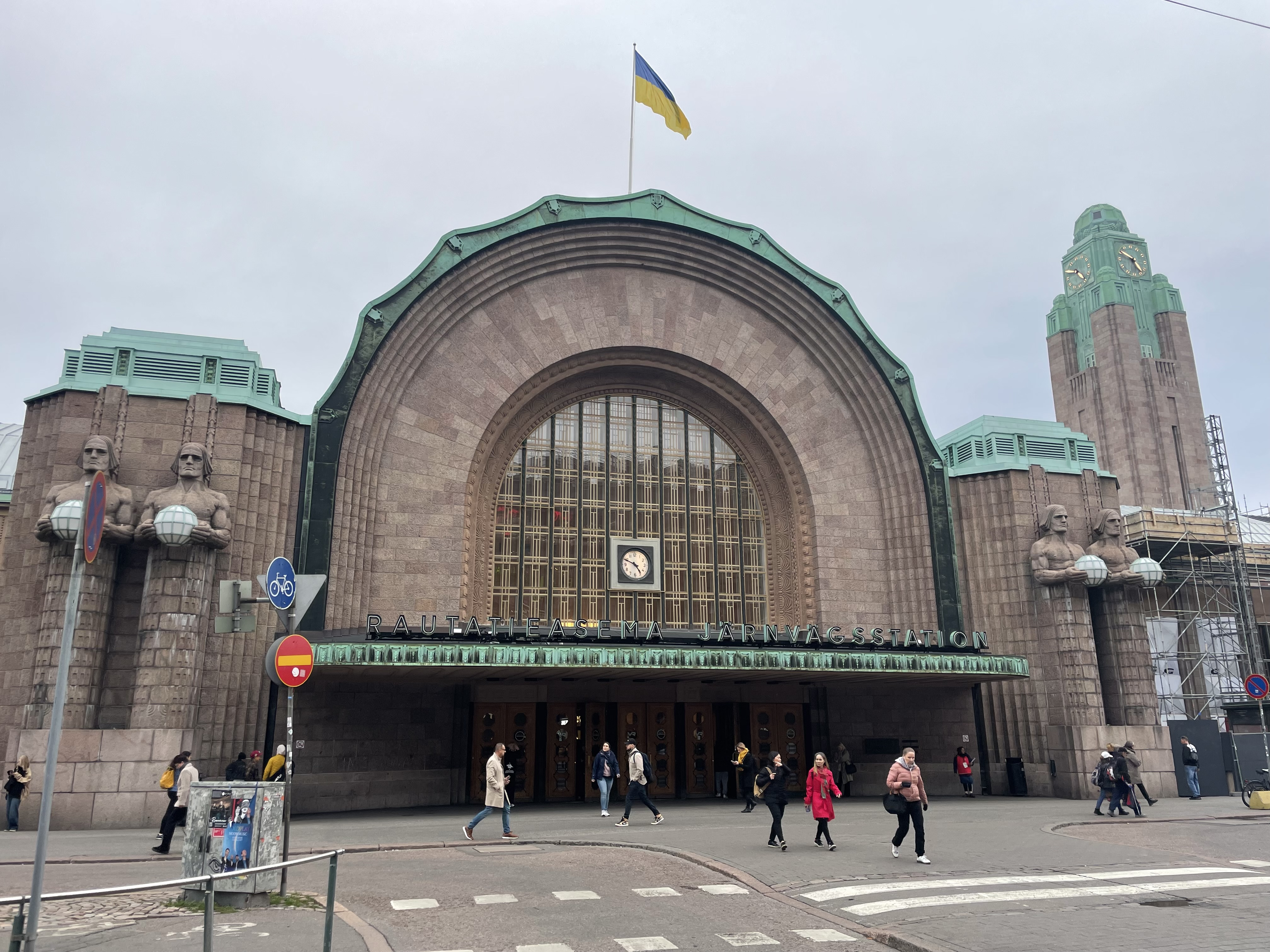
Station façade close up

At the time of its construction, the station building was very modern: it was made of concrete and iron, with a red granite facade. The dexterously curving vaults of the station halls are among the oldest examples of monumental concrete construction in Finland. The heavy stone building represents the late Art Nouveau style.

The concrete-roofed halls of the station building are also visible in its exterior architecture. The facade of the building became a combination of heavy granite surfaces and airy decorative elements and graceful window frames in a playful balance with them. The facade of the station is divided by pilasters with no feet or capitals. The smooth attic floors have windows, and they are topped with a slightly backwards swept mansard roof which was popular in the 1920s. This solution is familiar among German business building architecture, where Alfred Messel and Hermann Billing were among its first implementers.

== Features ==
=== Building ===
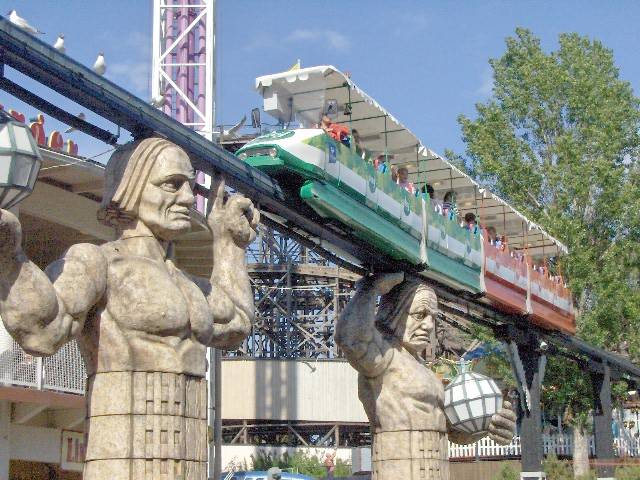
Parodies of the "stone men" statues at the Linnanmäki amusement park.

The station is mostly clad in Finnish granite, and its distinguishing features are its clock tower and the two pairs of statues holding the spherical lamps, lit at night-time, on either side of the main entrance. Animated characters based on the statues have recently been featured in some major advertising campaigns by Finland's government-owned railway operator VR, to the extent of releasing rap singles allegedly sung by Kivimiehet ("The stone men").

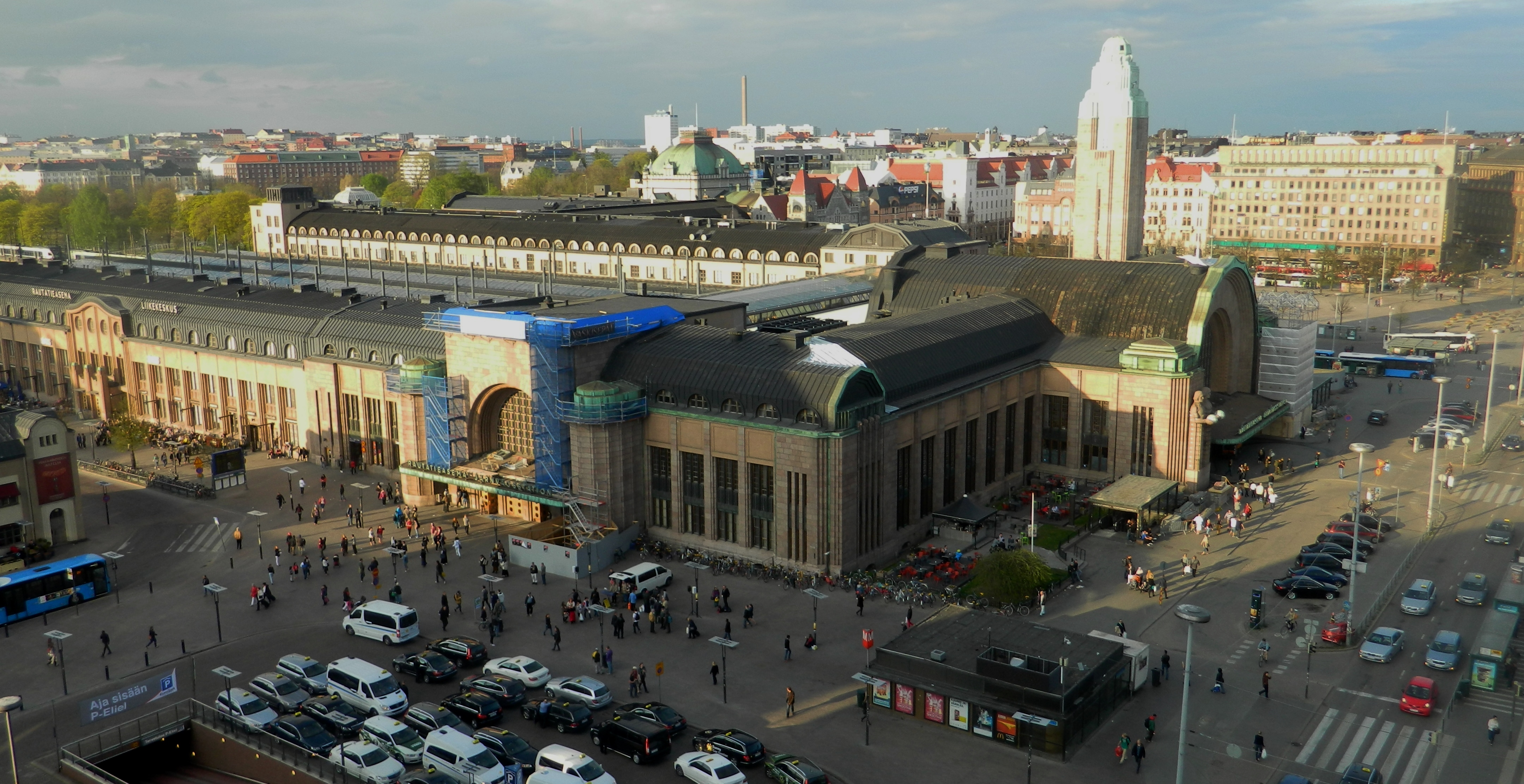
The Helsinki Central Station as seen from the Sokos department store.

The structure of the station building is made of brick. The lower, middle and upper bases of the walls contain steel-reinforced concrete, which is also used in the support structures of the vaults. The facade is made of red granite from Hanko and partly of plaster. The facade facing the railway yard is made of plaster and burnt brick. The roof of the building is made of iron sheet metal. Part of the window frames, the drainpipes and the linings of the eaves on the roof are made of copper sheet metal.

The central hall of the station building reaches to the top of the building and is a barrel vaulted space with an area of about 780 square metres. The former waiting halls of the station building are both shield arc vaulted spaces of about 450 square metres in area. The exit halls to the Rautatientori square and to the Eliel Square are 200 and 350 square metres, respectively. The covered inner yard surrounded by the "U" shape of the building has an area of about 1100 square metres.

=== Clock tower ===
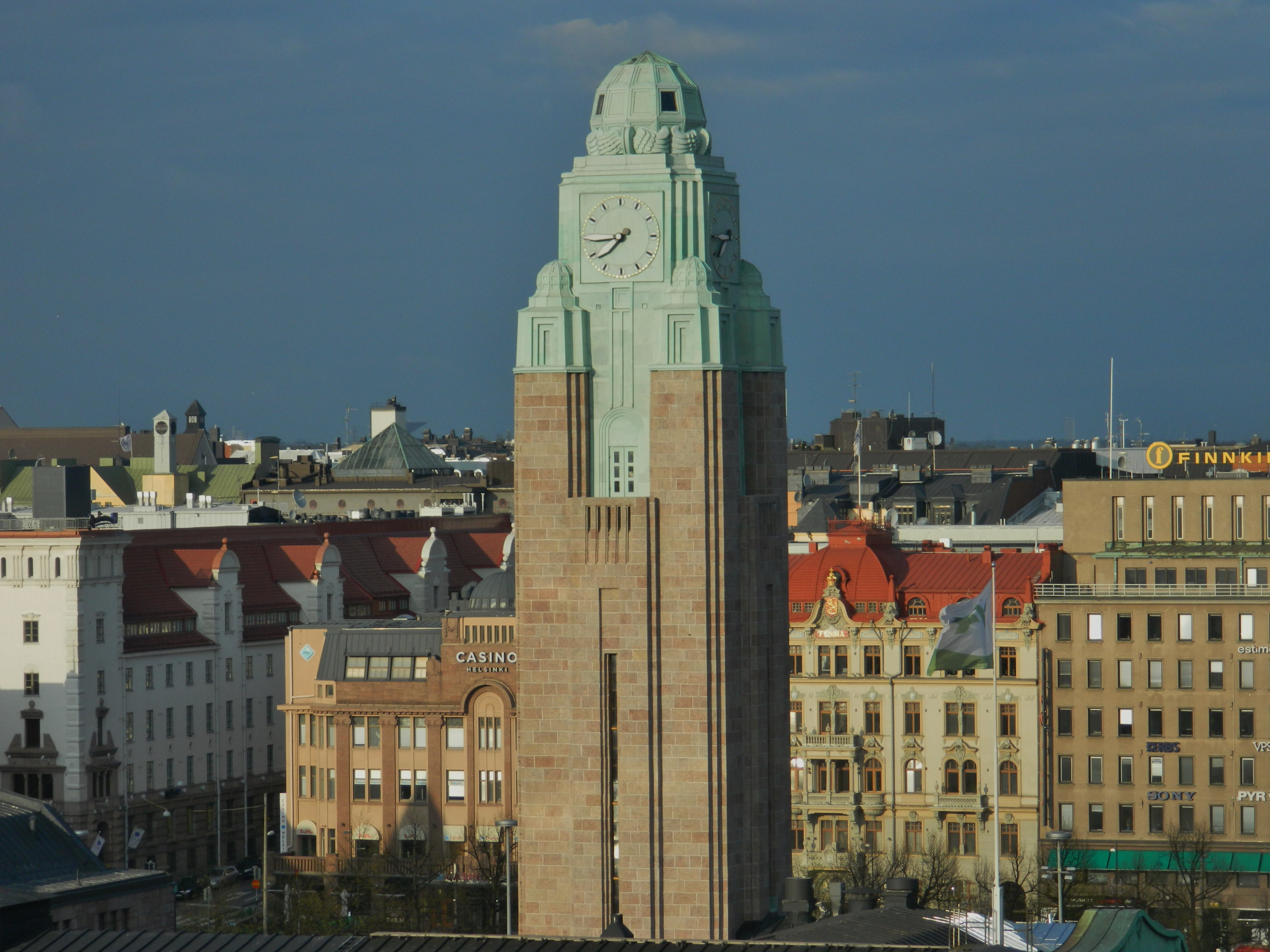
The clock tower of the Helsinki Central Station.

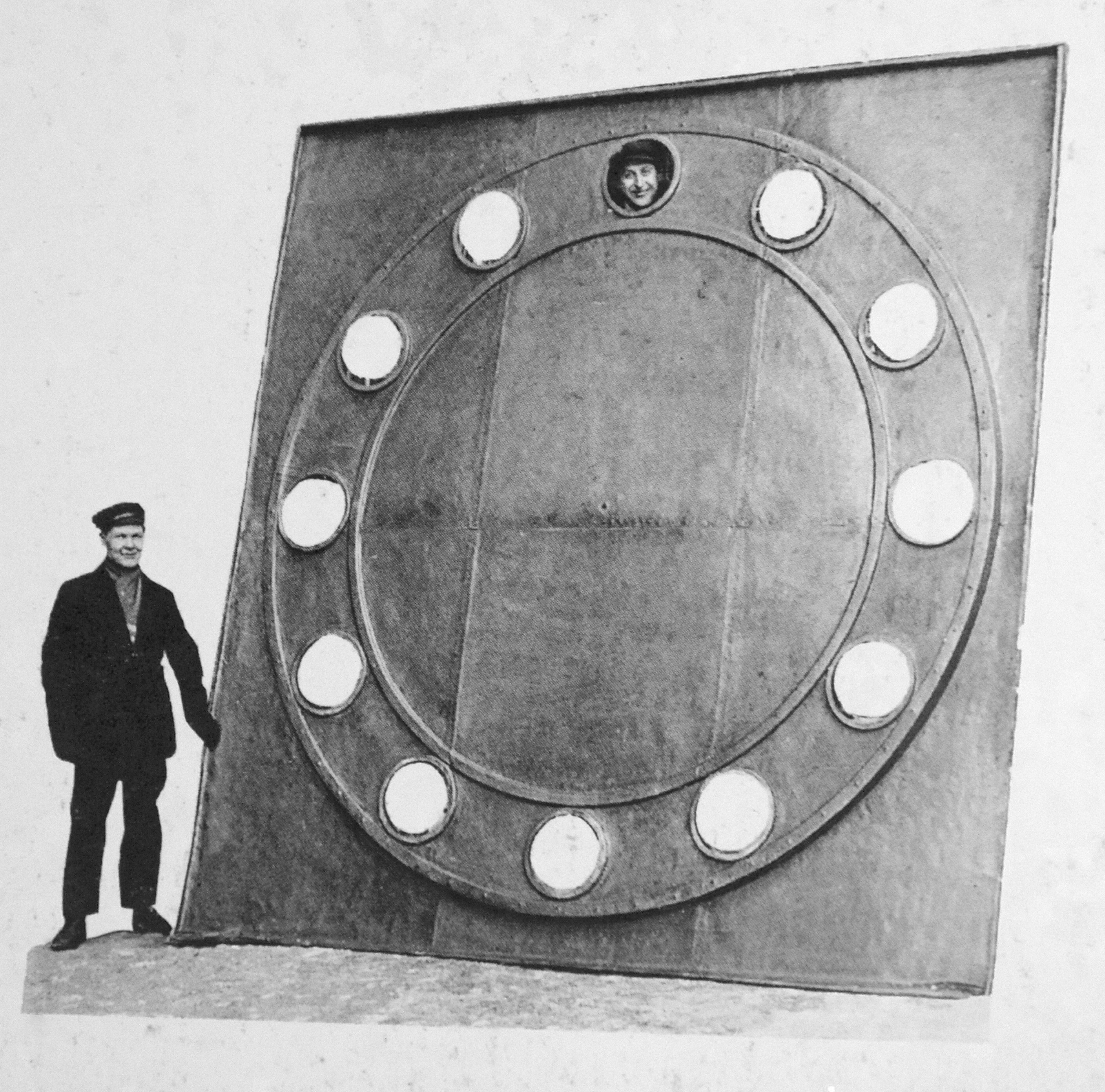
The clock tower was only actually fitted with clocks three years after its completion. Pictured is one of the four clock faces at the clock tower.

The clock tower of the station is among the best known landmarks in Helsinki. At the time of its completion it was the tallest tower in Helsinki, and it soon became a popular vantage point, with entrance tickets sold at its first times. As the station served as a military hospital during World War I, the clock tower was used as a temporary morgue. During World War II, the Lotta Svärd used the tower for air surveillance. The clock tower has vantage terraces in all four cardinal directions. The stairs at the bottom of the tower are made from concrete. The stairs at the top are made from wood. The tower remained closed to the public for an extended period before reopening in 2025, following the installation of an elevator originally included in Eliel Saarinen’s plans but not constructed due to a lack of funding. Visitors must climb a further 250 steps after the elevator ride to reach the observation platform.

The height of the clock tower measured from the street level is 48.5 metres. At the top of the tower is a globe supported by four winged wheels, symbolising the internationality of the station and the Finnish railways. The tower is built of walled brick and its facade consists of about 3600 pieces of Hanko granite. The roof is made of wood and is covered in copper. The copper roof of the tower weighs about five thousand kilograms and has a total area of about 150 square metres. The diameter of the bottom of the dome at the tower is about 4.5 metres. The area of the granite facade is about 1030 square metres. Each granite stone is about 250 millimetres thick and weighs about 240 kilograms.

The clock tower was completed in 1919 but was only fitted with German-made weighted clocks in 1922. At first, the clocks were set to show the time in Saint Petersburg. At first, the clocks were operated manually and the weights were moved by brawn. The clock tower has clocks in all four cardinal directions. The diameter of each clock face is exactly 3 metres measured from the outer edge of gilded minute markings. The hour hand of each clock is 119 centimetres long and weighs 60 kilograms. The minute hand is 150 centimetres long and weighs 56 kilograms together with its hidden counterweight (28 kilograms each). Before the corrective measurements in 2010, and in some sources even after this, there have been erroneous measurements differing from this for the clock face and the hands. Each clock face has its own machinery, and they were all digitally connected to the central clock of the Finnish Transport Administration in 1980.

The clock tower has been serviced and repaired many times. The latest repairs were made in March 2010. The repairs originally cost 1.5 million euro. As well as the red granite stones from Hanko, all the stone sews were replaced. The copper roof and the terraces of the tower were also repaired. At this time the cost of the repairs tripled and because of moisture damage, it came close to five million euro. In 2011 it was discovered that the clock can not stay on time because of impulse disturbance in the machinery. The impulses telling the clock to move its hands were accidentally set as too sensitive during the latest repairs.

=== Lyhdynkantajat statues ===
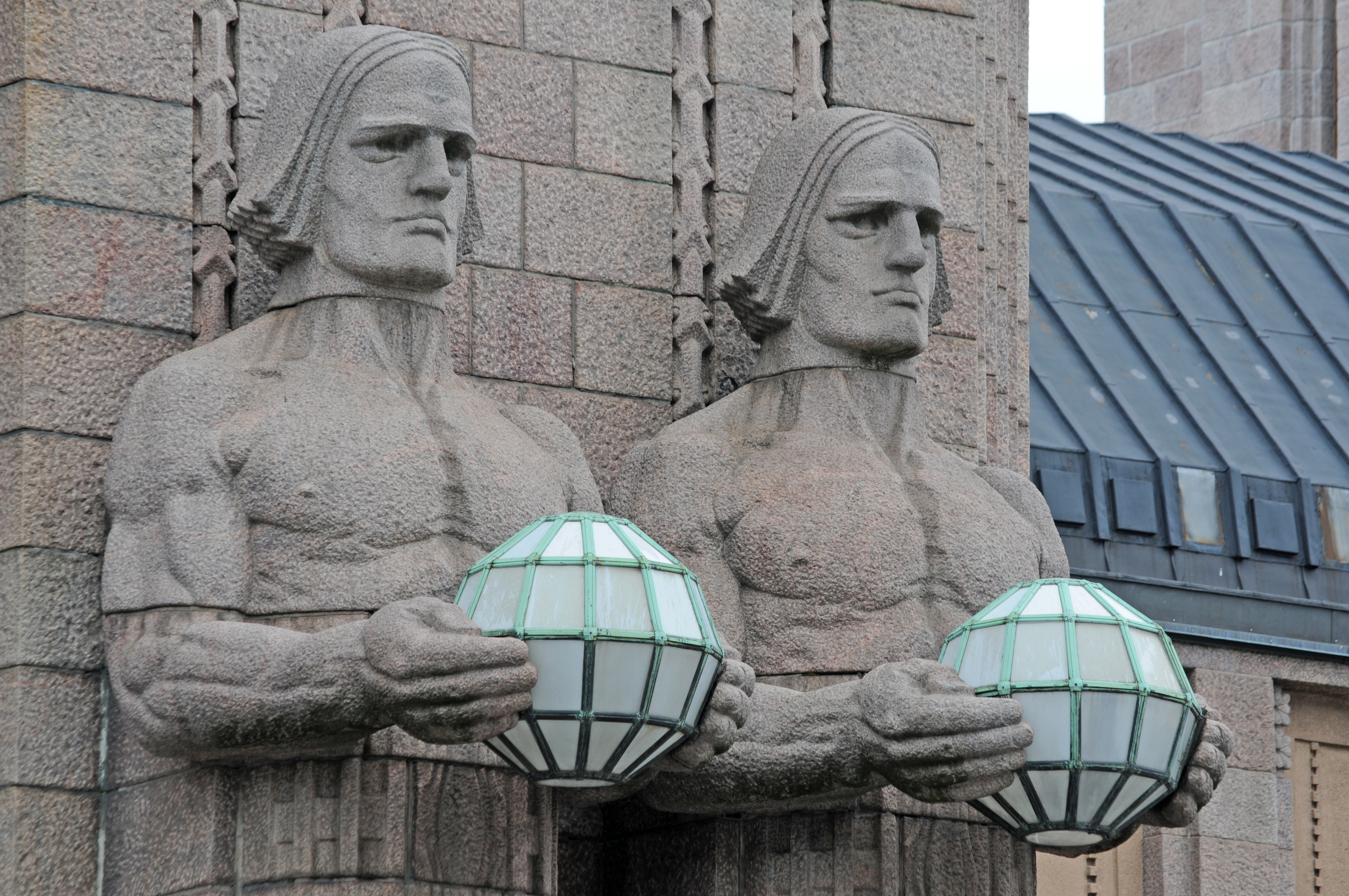
The granite sculptures on either side of the main entrance of the Helsinki Central Station are named Lyhdynkantajat ("The Lantern Bearers").

The stone statues on either side of the main entrance to the station building, built in 1914, are named Lyhdynkantajat ("The Lantern Bearers"). These granite statues were designed by the sculptor Emil Wikström. The sculpture group consists of four granite male figures holding spherical lanterns. The model for the sturdy faces of the statues is said to have been the tenant farmer Jalmari Lehtinen from Sääksmäki.

The Lyhdynkantajat statues have entered public knowledge through the "Kivimiehet" ("The Stone Men") advertisement campaign by the VR Group. The statues have been featured in print advertisements by image manipulation and in animation in television since 2002. Through the advertisements, the statues have become the mascots of the VR Group.

The head of each of the statue weighs about 1500 kilograms, the chest weighs about 6000 kilograms, and each arm weighs about 2000 kilograms. The Lyhdynkantajat statues spent the summer 2013 in temporary storage in Pasila because of wall renovations at the Helsinki Central Station. At the same time the statues were washed and renovated.

=== Presidential lounge ===
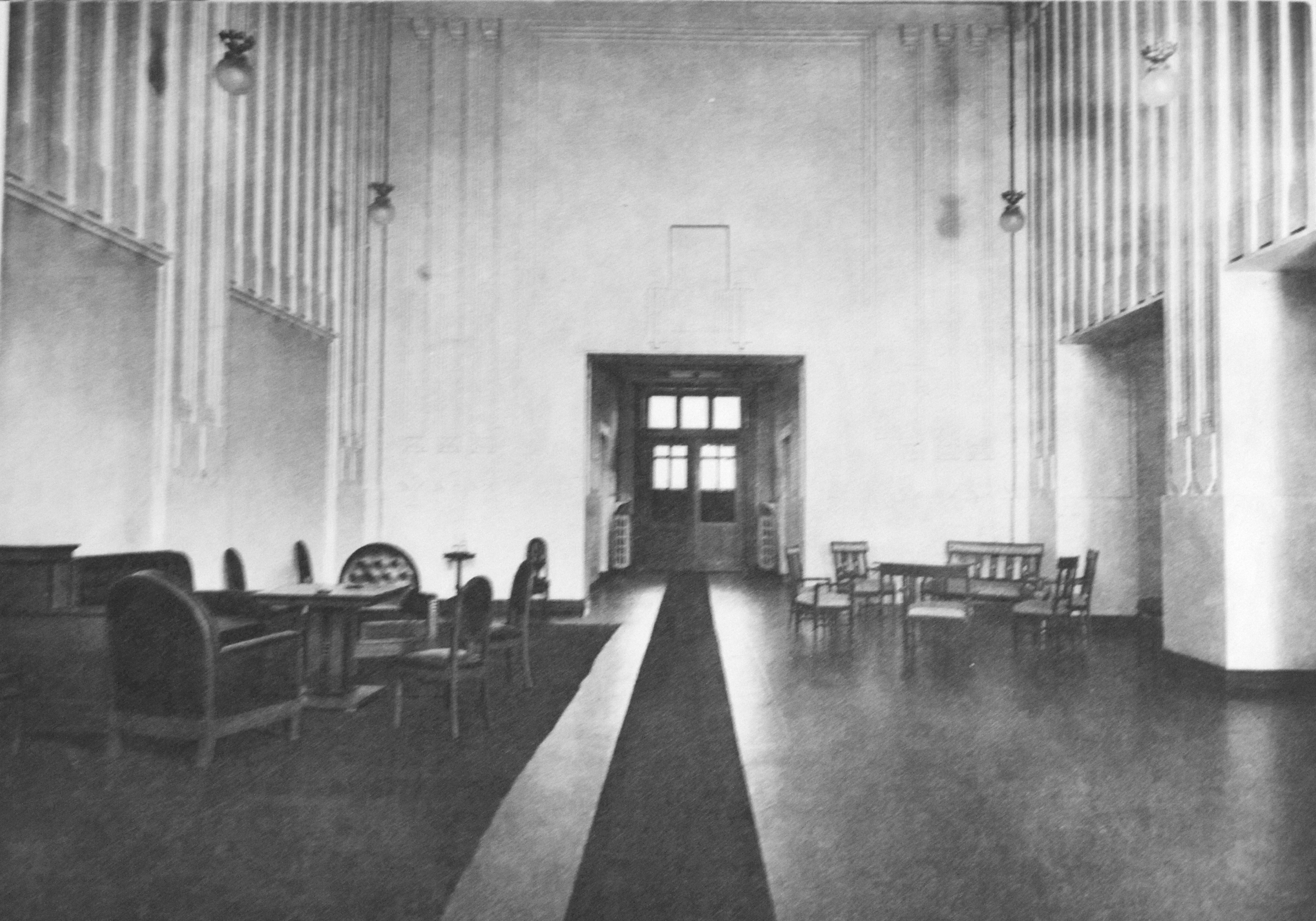
The presidential lounge

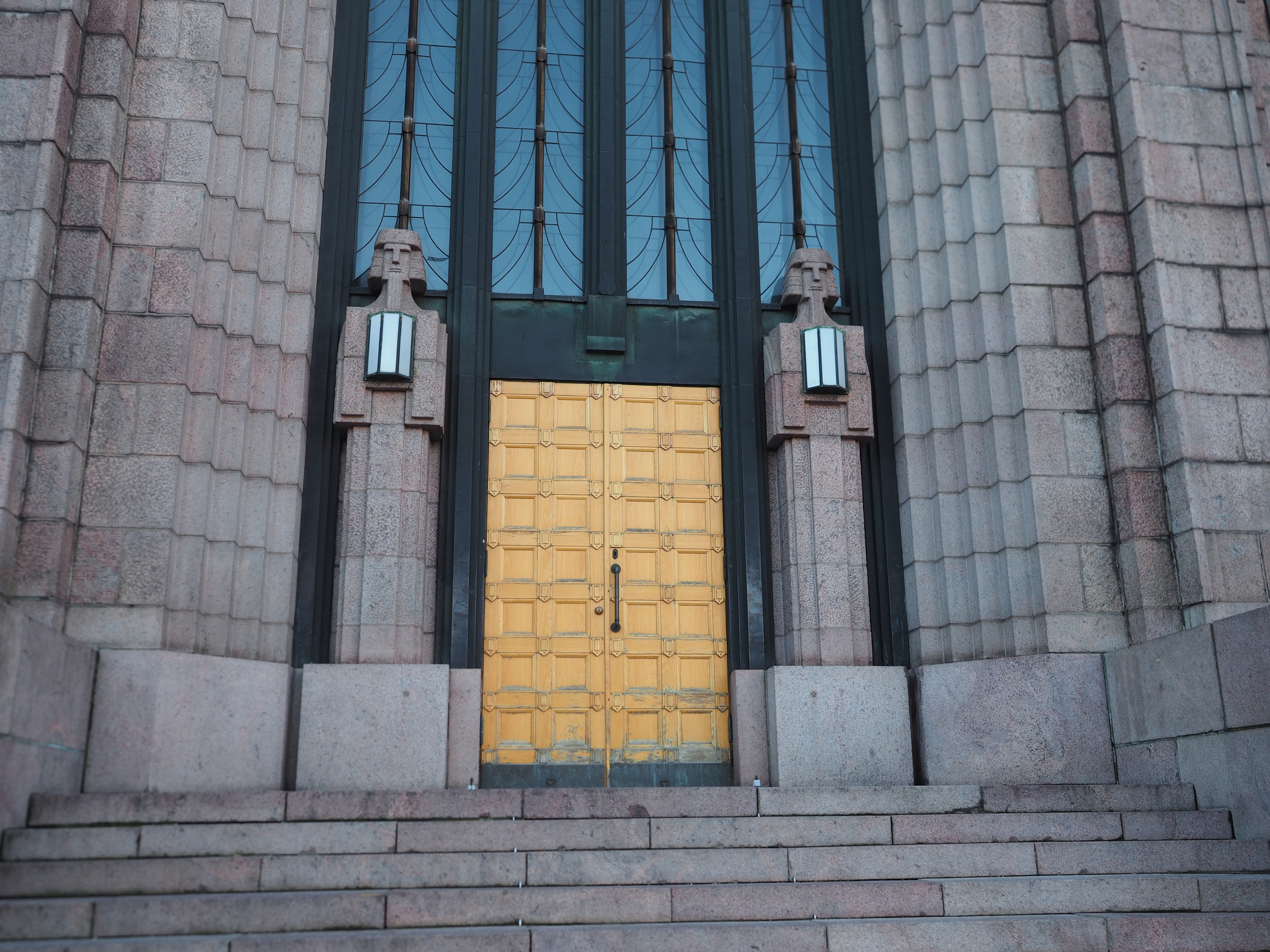
The main entrance to the presidential lounge, facing the Rautatientori Square.

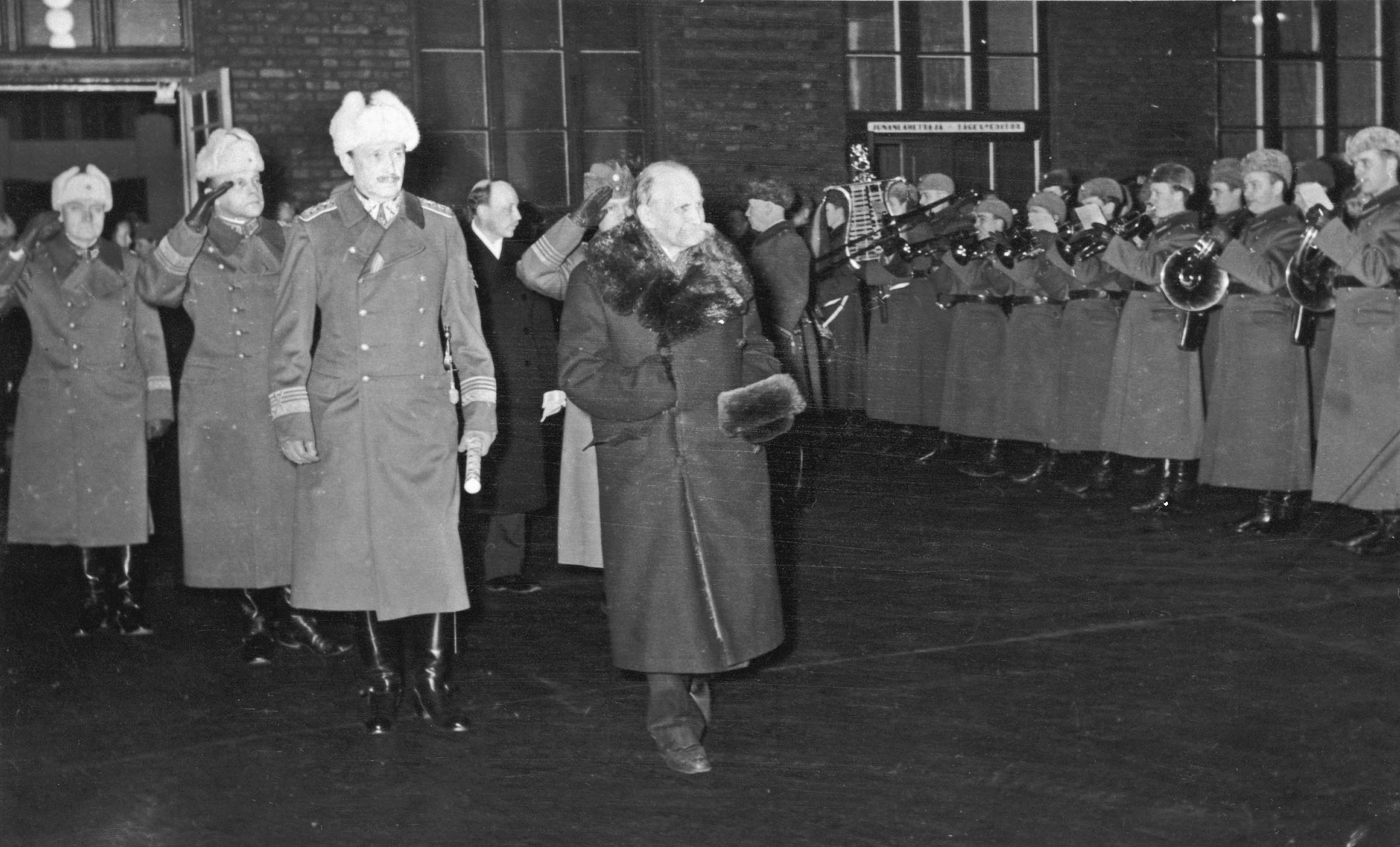
President Kallio (centre, at the front) together with Marshal Mannerheim (left of Kallio) at the Central Station on December 19, 1940, pictured a few seconds before a fatal heart attack.

Helsinki Central houses a private 50-square-metre (540 sq ft) waiting lounge exclusively for the use of the President of Finland and their official guests.

The First World War delayed its official inauguration to 1919, at which point it had been converted into a temporary military hospital, and was afterwards given to the use of the Finnish President.

The lounge, featuring furniture designed by Eliel Saarinen, has two entrances, a bigger one leading in from Rautatientori Square and a smaller one leading in from the main station hall. The lounge was completed in 1911 and was originally intended for the private use of the Emperor of Russia and other high-ranking guests. The exterior entrance to the lounge features two sculptures by the Norwegian sculptor Hans Uthuslien, resembling smaller versions of the Lyhdynkantajat sculptures. Emperor Nicholas II of Russia entered the Rautatientori Square on the last ever imperial visit to the Grand Duchy of Finland through the lounge. After Finland became independent the lounge was reserved for the President of Finland.

Counsellor of state Juho Kusti Paasikivi held discussions in the lounge with his staff on negotiation trips to Moscow before the Winter War in autumn 1939. In 1940 President Kyösti Kallio, grown weary from the state of war and having recently resigned from his duties as president was travelling from Helsinki to his home in Nivala. Only moments afterwards he had a sudden heart attack and died on the arms of his entourage on the main platform of the station. Among his entourage were Marshal of Finland Carl Gustaf Emil Mannerheim and Risto Ryti, elected to succeed Kallio as president. According to legend Kallio died in the arms of Marshal Mannerheim, but this is most likely part of the construction of Mannerheim's personal cult. In reality he died in the arms of his adjutant, Colonel Aladár Paasonen and Colonel Aksel Airo.

The presidential lounge has later been used by various presidents to travel by train or to accept visitors arriving by train.

=== Transport ===
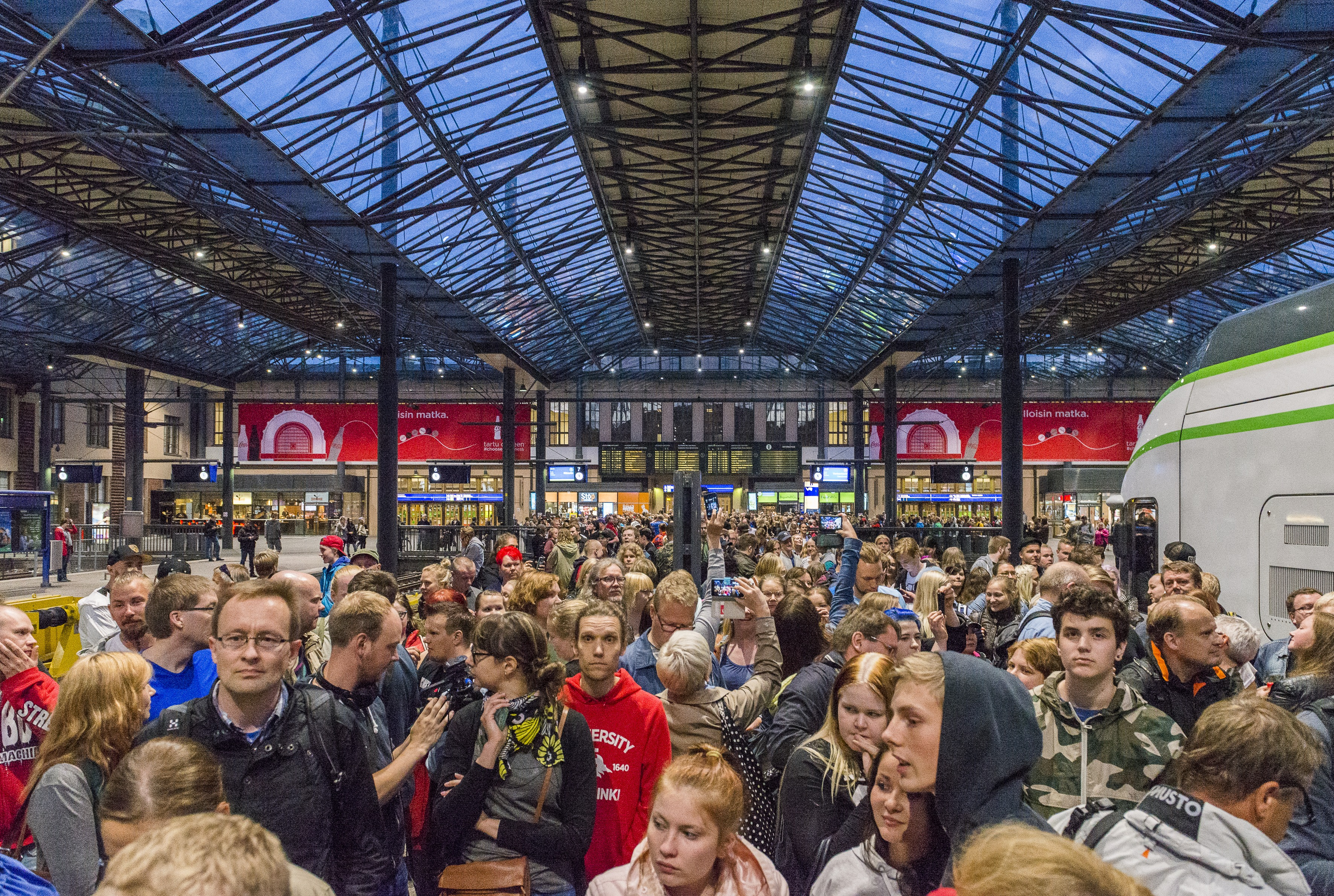
Human traffic jam at the station platform of the last M train leading to Vantaankoski, Vantaa

There are 19 platforms at the station. Platforms 1–3 are on the east side and serve local trains on the Tikkurila route, their tracks stop short of the main station roof. Platforms 4–11, which accommodate long-distance trains, are physically within the station building. Platforms 5–10 serve trains running via Tikkurila to Tampere and other points north and east, platforms 11 and 12 serve express trains via the Espoo line to Turku. Platforms 12–19, which do not stretch to the building itself, are on the west side and serve local trains on the Leppävaara and Kehärata routes. The tracks funnel into separate express and local tracks for both the Espoo and the Tikkurila routes with the express tracks in the middle and the local tracks on the outside, aligning with their respective platforms. This gives eight principal tracks but there is an additional ninth express track for the Tikkurila route out through the Pasila station, the first stop out, about five minutes or 3 km north of Central.

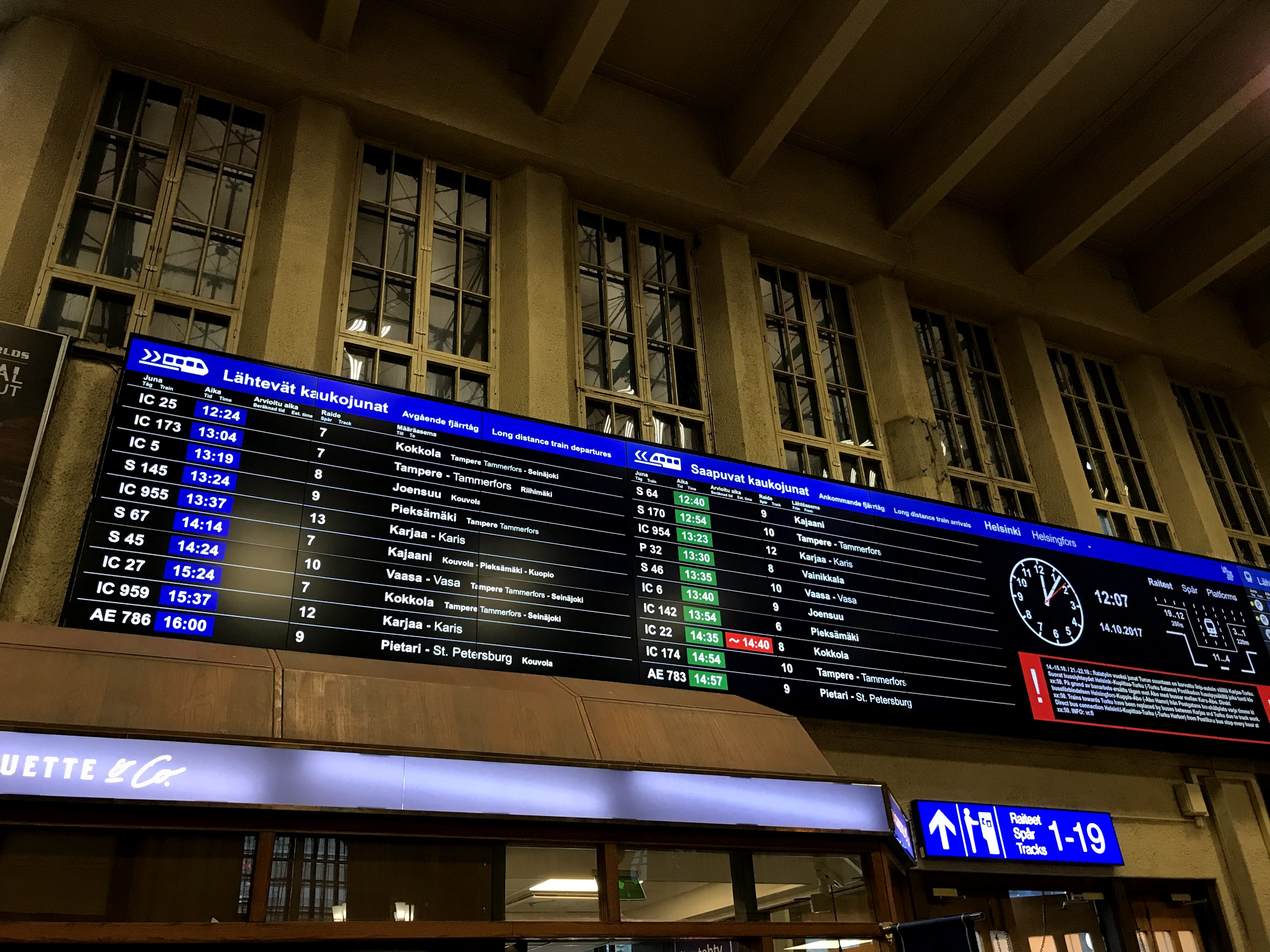
LCD at the main hall

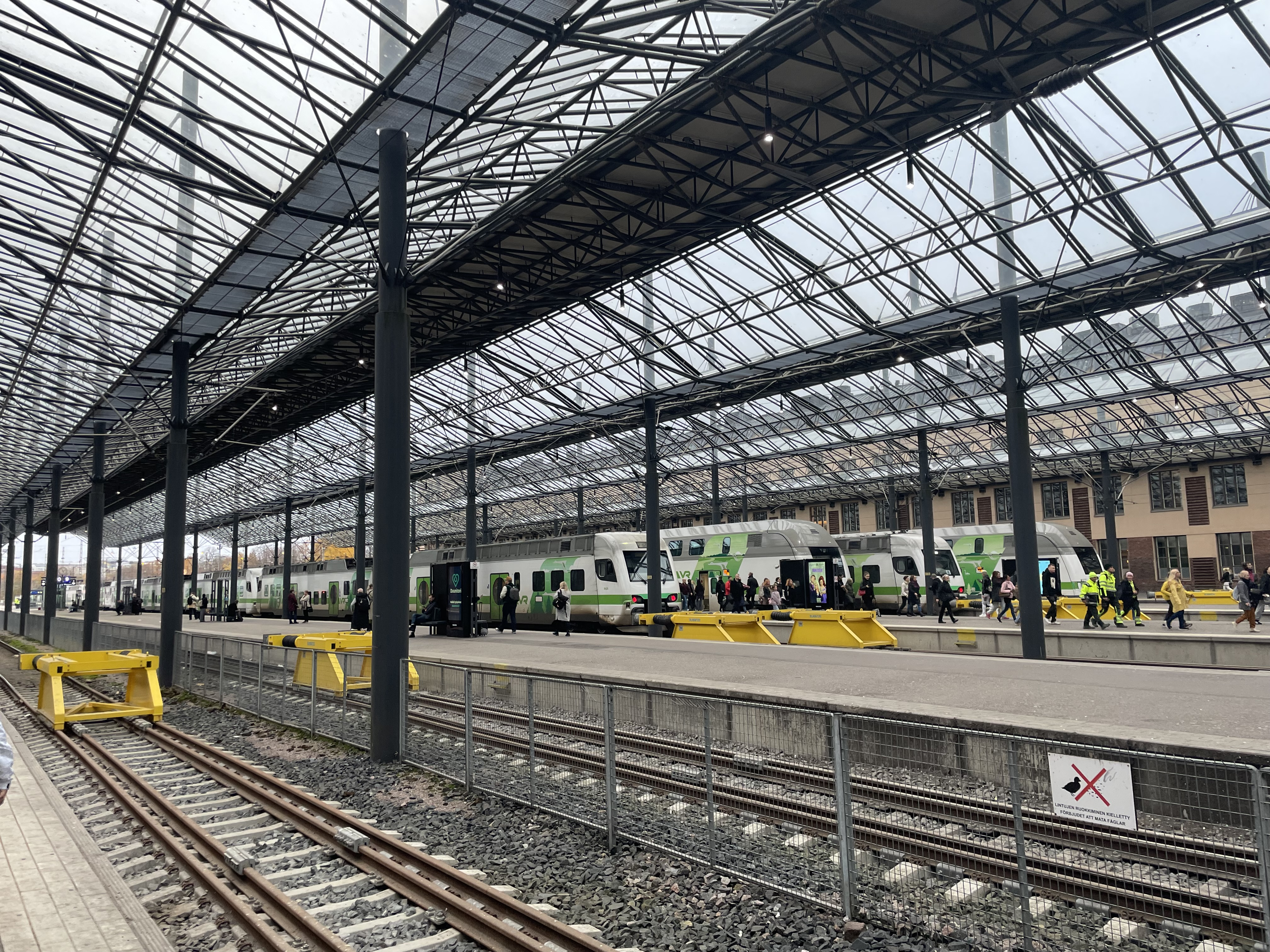
Train platforms

Helsinki Central serves as a hub for Finnish transport. There are many platforms for local buses on both the west and the east sides of the main station building. The Helsinki Metro Central Railway Station metro station is located under the main station building, linked through Asematunneli, which has entrances in the main hall of the station and at various points in the surrounding streets. The majority of Helsinki's tram routes pass in front of or to the west of the station. The Helsinki central bus station is located at Kamppi Center, about 400 m, or one metro stop, to the west of the railway station. There are two squares near the railway station: the Railway Square and the Eliel Square.

Although the Helsinki Airport is reachable from the station by the I/P commuter rail service, there are also regular bus connections between the station and the airport: two regional buses operated by HSL, and a private express coach operated for Finnair.

== Tracks ==
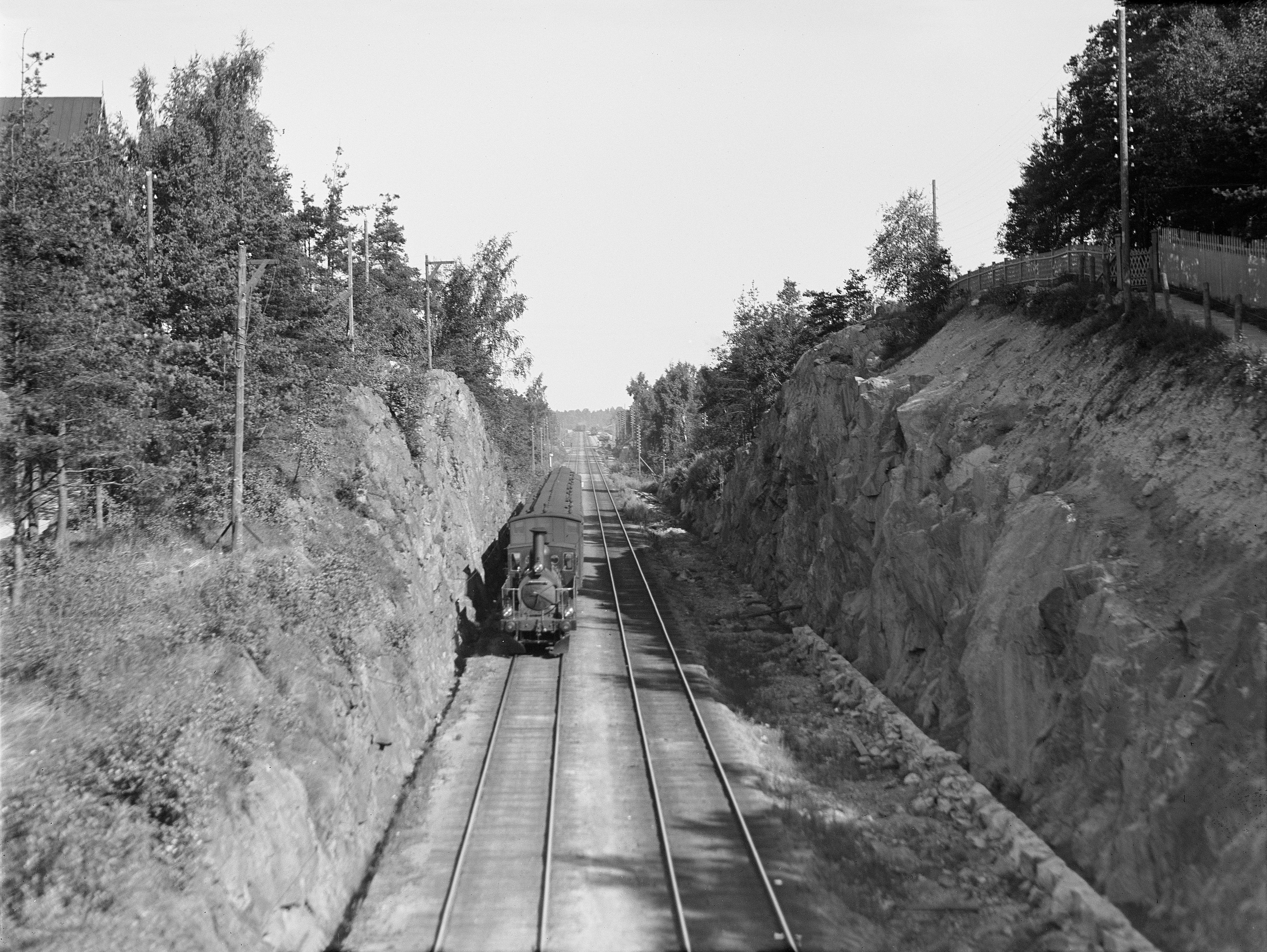
A photograph of a train at the Linnunlaulu cliff cut in 1908, by I. K. Inha.

A schematic map of the tracks at the Helsinki Central Station. Green lines denote commuter traffic on the Rantarata line, yellow lines denote long-distance traffic on the Rantarata line, red lines denote long-distance traffic on the Finnish Main Line, blue lines denote commuter traffic on the Finnish Main Line, and black lines denote service traffic. Arrows denote the direction of traffic and spheres denote stabling tracks.

The first railway connection from Helsinki to Hämeenlinna only had a single track. However, the cliff cut at Linnunlaulu was fitted for two parallel tracks right from the start. As traffic increased, a second track was built next to the first one in 1892. The Linnunlaulu cliff has since been further cut and the track lining has been widened several times.

The Helsinki railway station was originally built outside the city centre. This left enough space to build a railway machinery yard and a locomotive hangar next to the station. However, they later became encompassed by the growing city and so the locomotive hangar was gradually moved to the Pasila machinery yard since 1899. In 1923 the number of platforms was increased from six to eight by narrowing the platforms and removing the separate baggage platforms. In 1925 two new tracks were built between Helsinki Central and Pasila stations for service traffic. In the 1890s the Helsinki harbour rail was built from the Helsinki railway station through southern Helsinki to Katajanokka. Its use later decreased so much that it started to be gradually dismantled since the 1970s. It was finally completely dismantled in 2009 after the Vuosaari Harbour was completed.

From 1969 to 1970 new tracks were built on the Rantarata railway between Helsinki Central and Pasila. In the 1900s, the Linnunlaulu cliff cut was subject to intense discussion for two times: first because of the construction of the Tikkurila city track and later because of the Leppävaara city track. The cultural value of the cliffs and villas at Linnunlaulu threatened to completely cancel the construction of the Leppävaara city track.

Today, the Helsinki Central Station has 19 platform tracks. Long-distance traffic and "proper" commuter traffic has been concentrated to the middle of the station. Traffic on the Kerava city track, as well as traffic on the eastern side of the Ring Rail Line mainly uses tracks 1 to 4, while traffic to Espoo and on the western side of the Ring Rail Line uses tracks 12 to 19. There are 10 tracks in total parallel with each other between the Helsinki Central and Pasila stations. Of these, the four eastern tracks belong to the Finnish Main Line, the two middle ones are service tracks used by the Ilmala depot, and the four western ones belong to the Rantarata line.

The railway yard of the Helsinki Central Station has a total of 83 concentrated switches, of which 40 are simple switches and 43 are double-sided crossing switches. All of them are short 1:9 switches with a maximum allowed speed of 35 km/h.

At peak traffic time, the Helsinki railway yard operates at the extent of its transport capacity. Thus even the smallest disturbances at the Helsinki railway yard can easily mess up the entire train traffic. The terminus form of the station building and its cramped location prevent the expansion of the current railway yard. The Helsinki City Rail Loop has been proposed as a solution for this problem, allowing commuter trains to be placed underground. On the other hand, another solution has been investigated, based on individual changes to switches and geometry and renewal of the commuter trains, as well as improving access control. This solution is dependent on the Lentorata line, the new bypass line from Riihimäki to Tampere and the Helsinki–Turku high-speed railway.

== Incidents and accidents ==
Over the years, there have been a few incidents at Helsinki Central. However, no lives have been lost as a result :

- 28 August 1926: a passenger train (pulled by Hv2 674) crashed into the passenger hall. 18 were injured.
- 19 December 1940: President Kyösti Kallio suffered a fatal heart attack at this railway station, where he had arrived for boarding a train to Nivala.
- 23 October 1944: a passenger train from Turku crashed through a buffer stop. The locomotive ended in the outer hall of the station.
- 5 October 1990: a runaway freight train crashed into the building. Two wagons ended in the passenger hall and many others ended on the platforms.
- 4 January 2010: four empty passenger cars overran the buffers of platform 13, crashing into the building behind it.

== Gallery ==
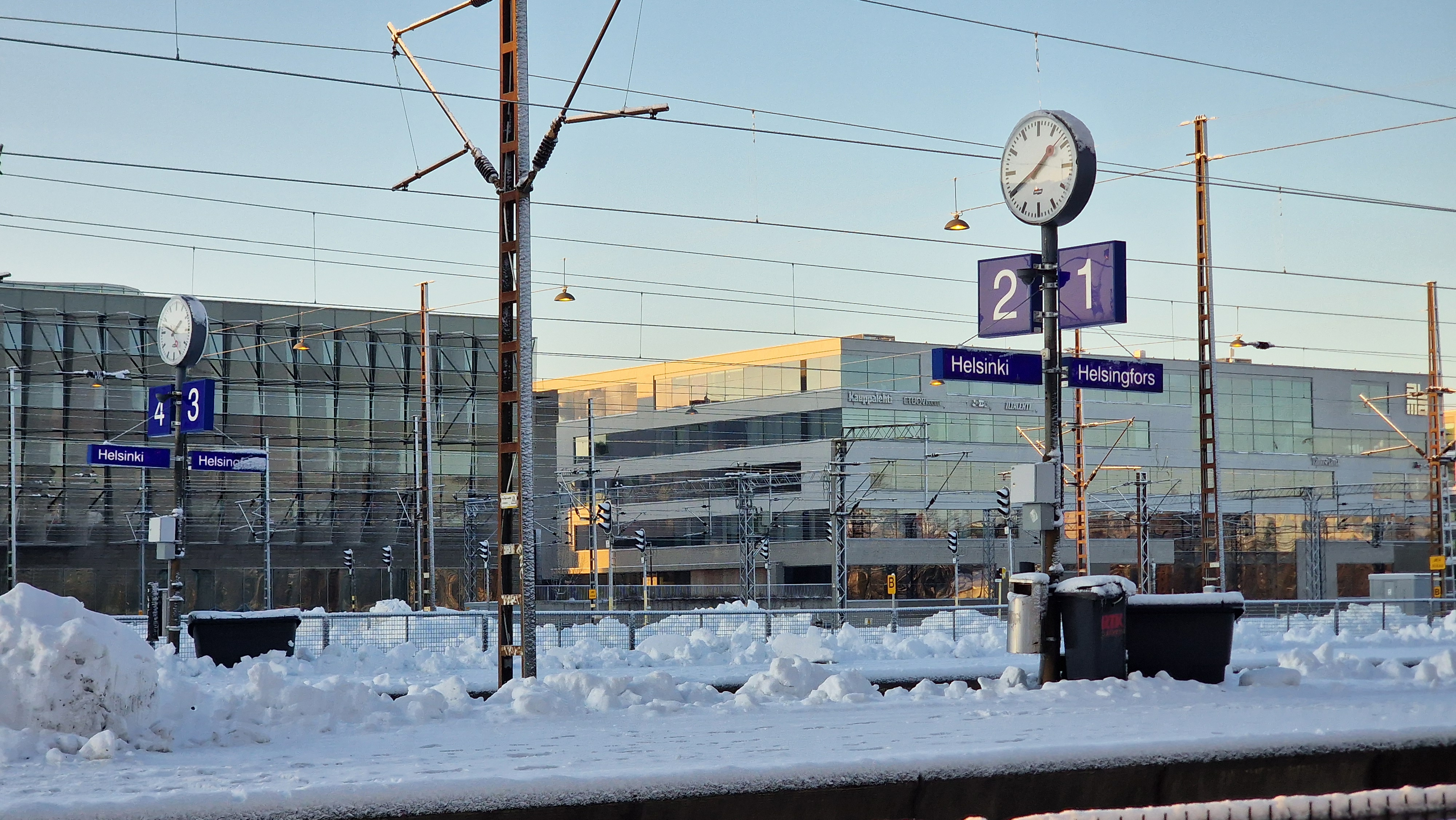
The station platforms in the snow

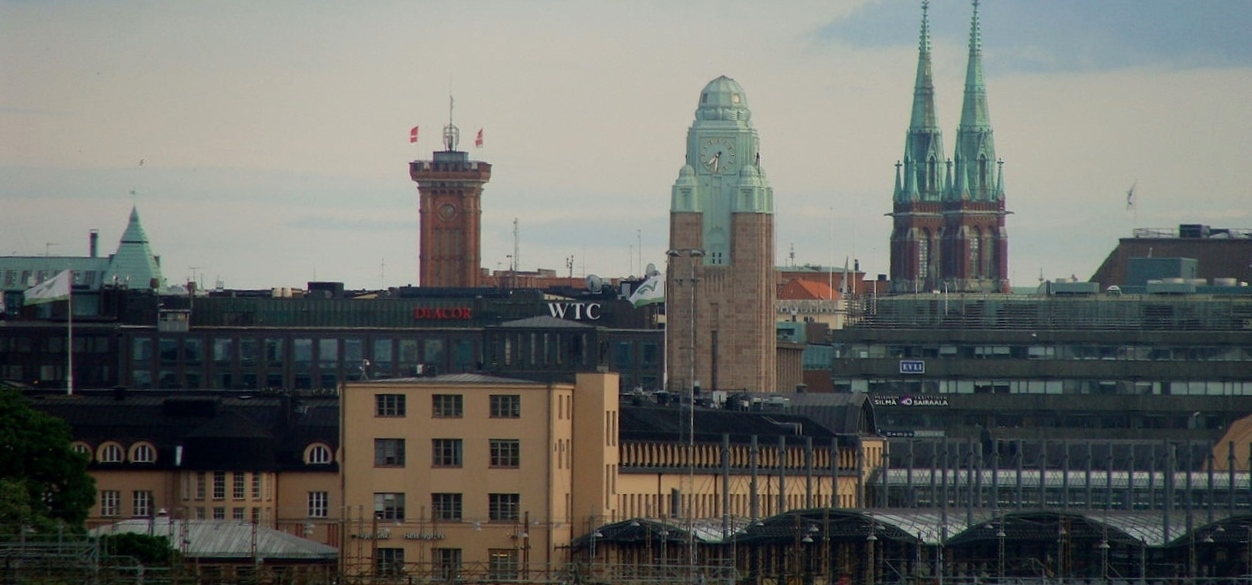
Helsinki Central's tower.

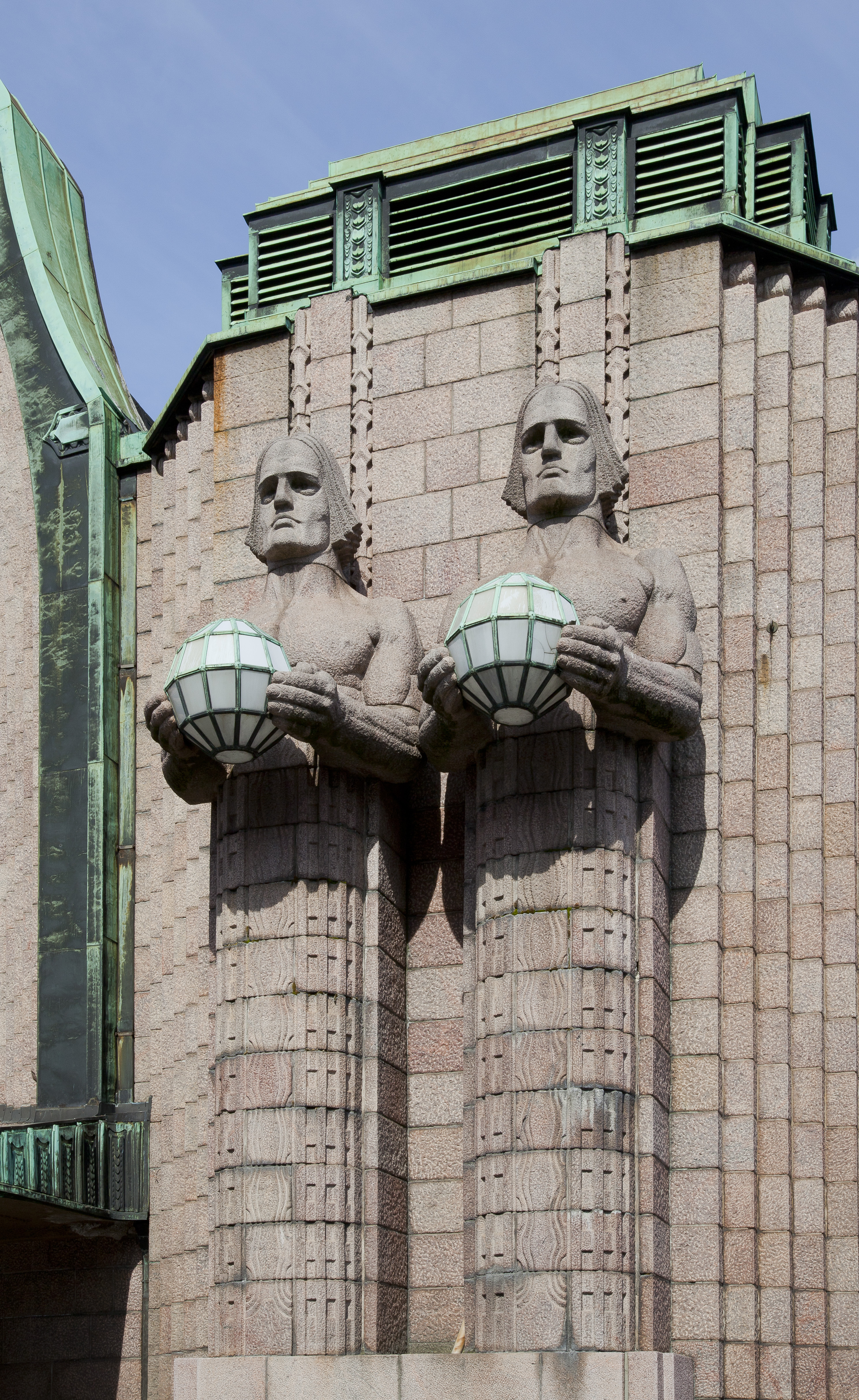
Statues at the station

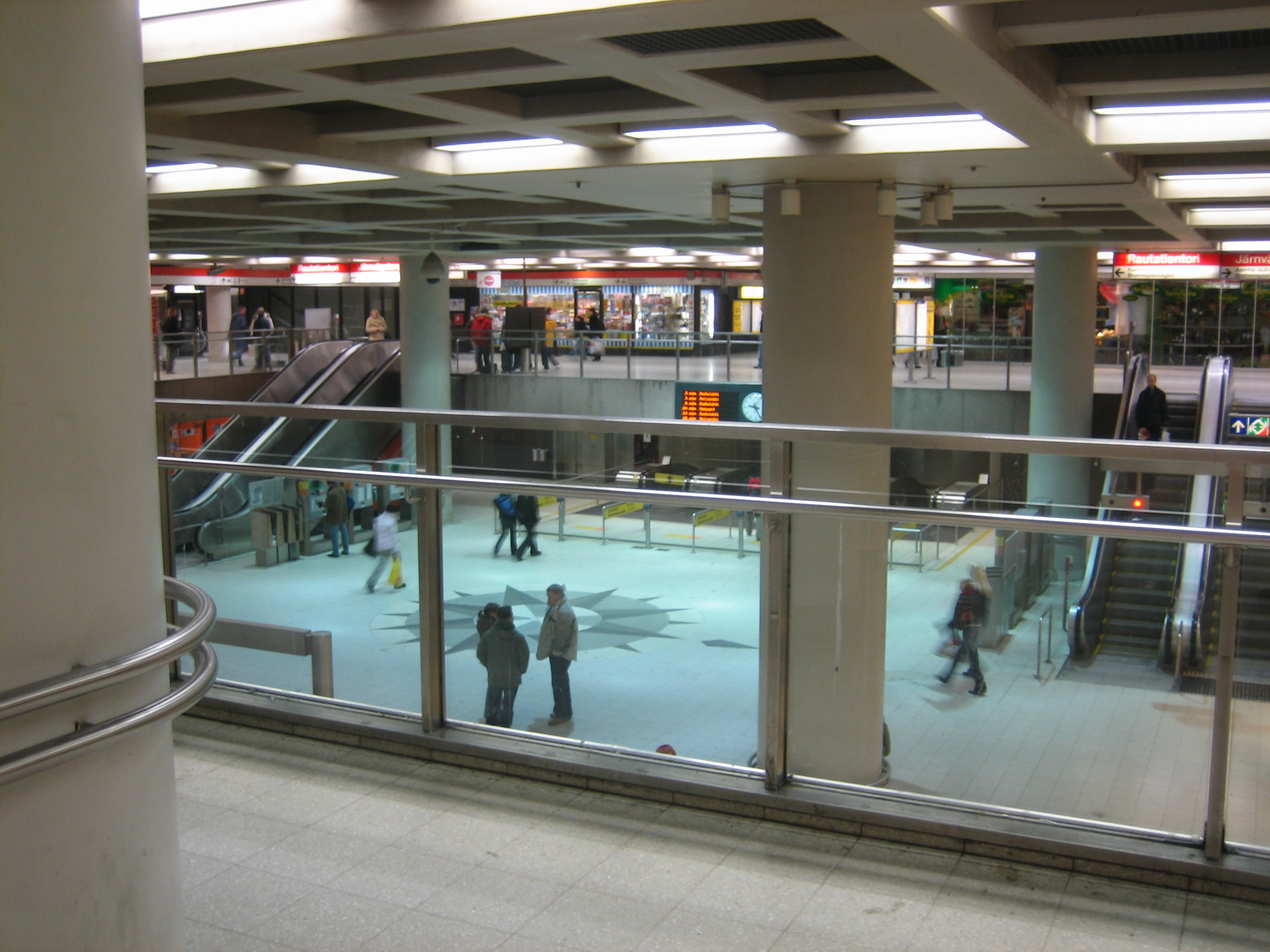
The metro station can be accessed through the Asematunneli complex

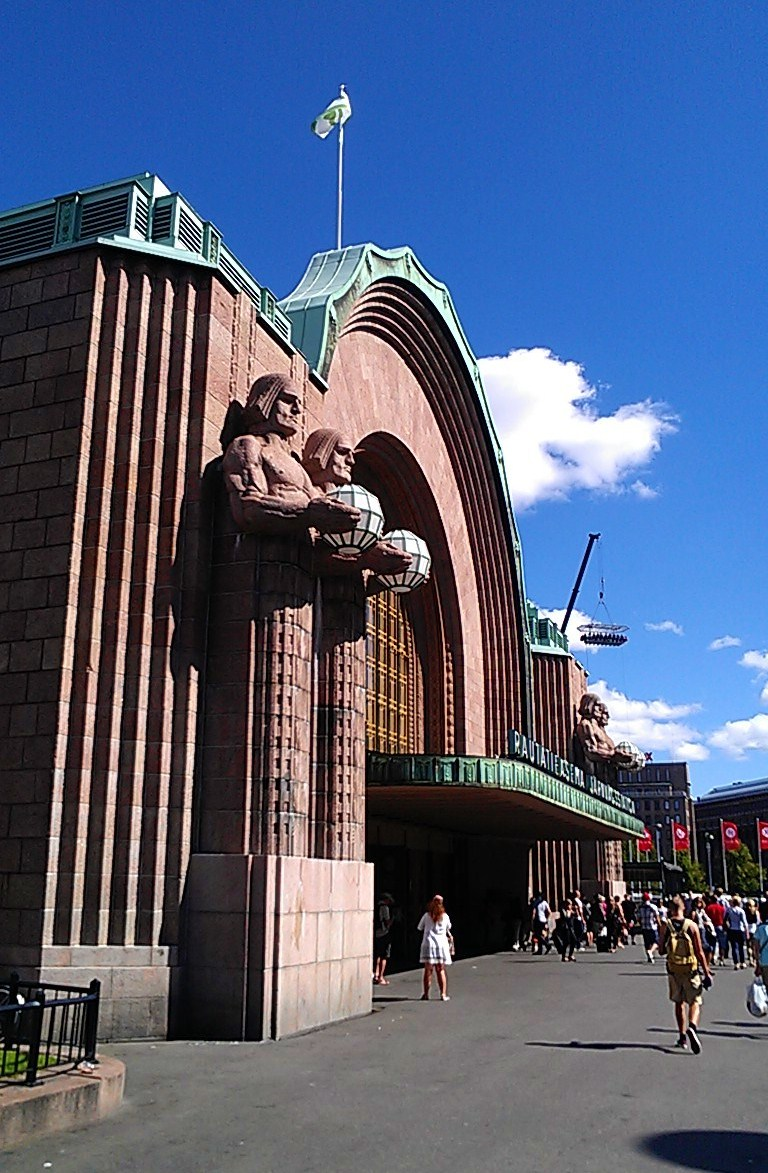
The main entrance on Kaivokatu.

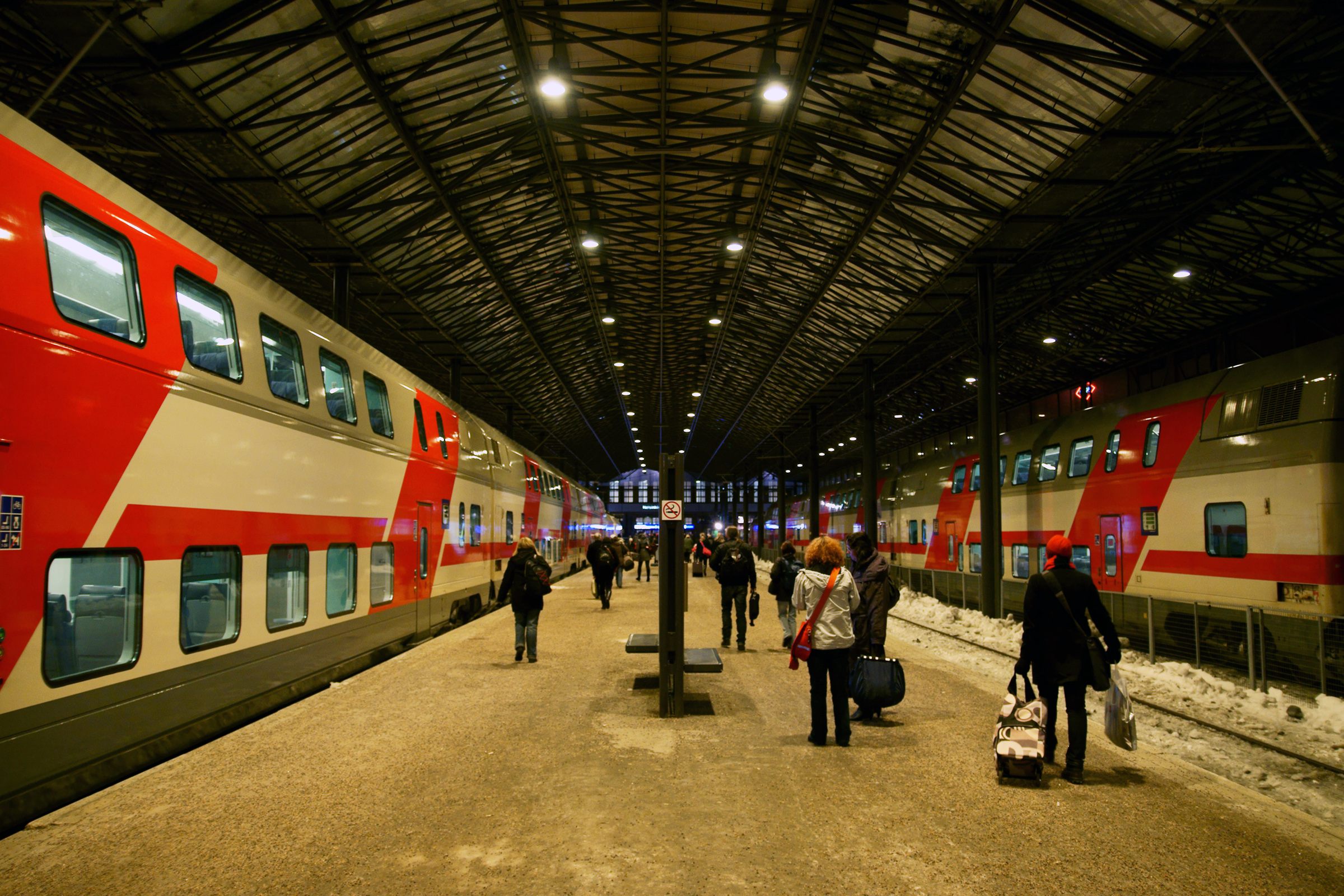
InterCity 2 trains under the glass ceiling

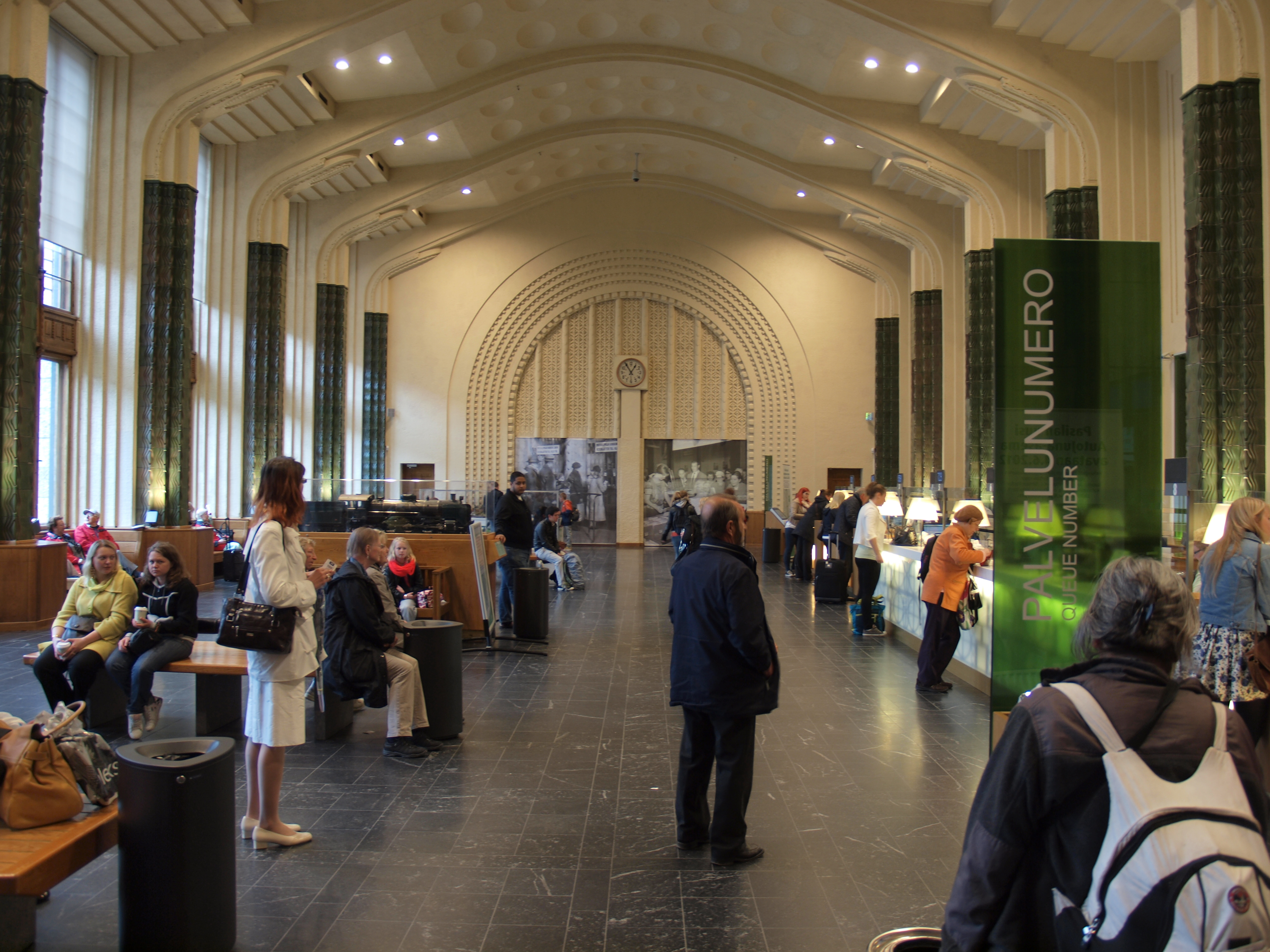
The former ticket hall in the Helsinki Central railway station, later converted into an Italian restaurant.

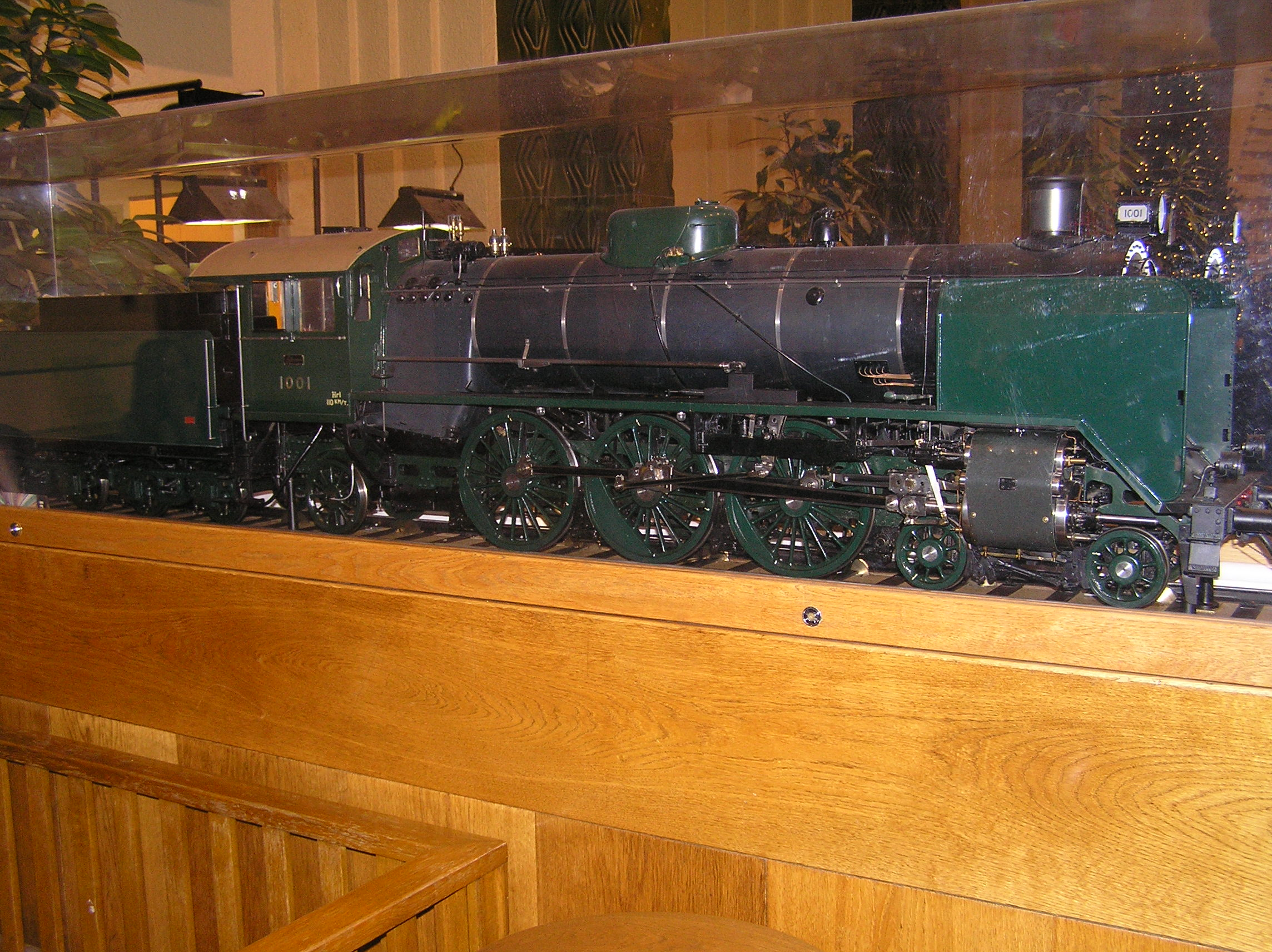
Scale 1:10 model of VR Class Hr1 1001 in the ticket hall of Helsinki Central Station

== See also ==
- List of railway lines in Finland
  - Finnish Main Line
- Cincinnati Union Terminal

== Bibliography ==
- Högström, Hilkka (1996). Helsingin rautatieasema [Helsinki railway station]. Helsinki. ISBN 951-53-0533-0.
