= Myllymäki railway station =

Railway station in Ähtäri, Finland

Myllymäki
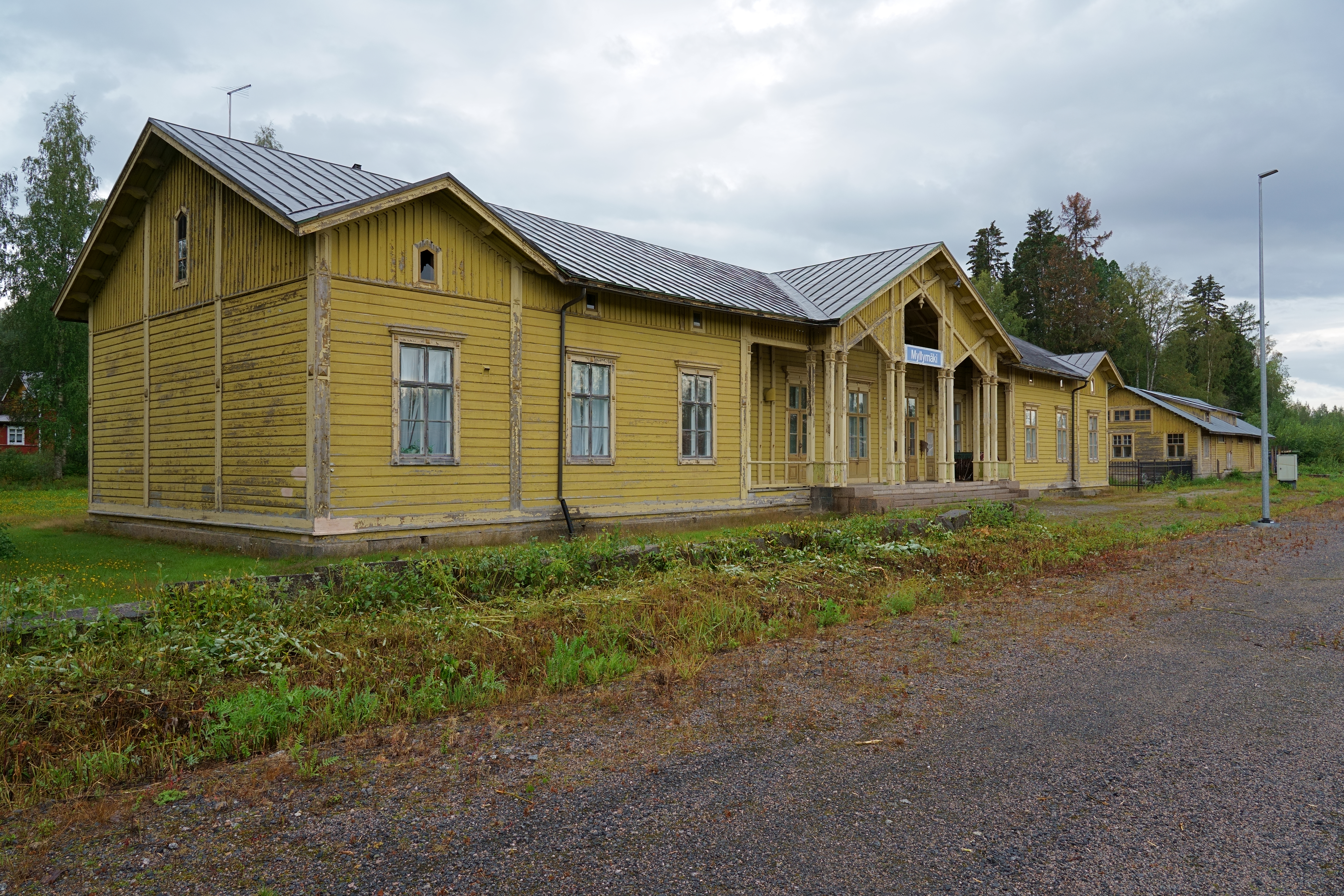

General information
- Location: Asematie, 63900; Myllymäki, Ähtäri; Finland
- Coordinates: 62°31′30″N 024°16′44″E
- System: VR station
- Owner: Finnish Transport Infrastructure Agency
- Line: Haapamäki–Seinäjoki
- Platforms: 1 side platform
- Tracks: 1
- Train operators: VR Group

Other information
- Station code: My
- Classification: Halt

History
- Opened: 29 September 1883

Passengers
- 2008: 3,000

Services
Preceding station	VR Group	Following station
Pihlajavesi towards Haapamäki	Haapamäki–Seinäjoki	Eläinpuisto-Zoo towards Seinäjoki
Location

The Myllymäki railway station (Finnish: Myllymäen rautatieasema, Swedish: Myllymäki järnvägsstation) is located in the town of Ähtäri, Finland, in the village of Myllymäki. It is located along the Haapamäki–Seinäjoki railway, and its neighboring stations are Pihlajavesi in the south and Eläinpuisto-Zoo in the north.

The Finnish Heritage Agency has proclaimed the Myllymäki station as a built cultural environment of national significance.

== History ==
Myllymäki was originally planned to become an important junction station: the diet of Finland during its 1877 session discussed plans to build two "trunk line" railways in the country, which were to intersect in Myllymäki. The first would diverge from the Riihimäki–Saint Petersburg railway in Taavetti and proceed towards Vaasa via Mikkeli and Jyväskylä railway station, and the other was to run from Tampere to Oulu via Kärsämäki. These plans ended up changing significantly with time, as the Jyväskylä line was to be built beginning from Haapamäki, and that of Oulu from Seinäjoki.

Myllymäki became one of original stations of the Tampere–Vaasa railway, being officially opened on 29 September 1883 as the only class III station on the line. The station housed a restaurant, whose owner resided in a house on-site. The station also housed a post office from 1888 on.

In spite of its status as a junction station never being realized, Myllymäki became an important intermediate station in its region. This stemmed in part from its location approximately halfway between Tampere and Vaasa, making it a frequent meeting point for trains traversing the line. It was also significant as a cargo station; it came to handle one of the largest volumes of loaded timber in the country. Tar also became a notable type of commodity transported from Myllymäki.

== Architecture ==
The station building in Myllymäki was constructed according to blueprints approved for class III stations in 1881, being presumably designed by Knut Nylander. The distinctively large building stays as a remnant of the station's status as a junction station from the Finnish railway plans of the late 1800s.

== Services ==
VR Group operates two daily regional train services in each direction on the route Jyväskylä–Seinäjoki, all of which call in Myllymäki. These services are operated with Dm12 railbuses. The station does not have ticketing services nor a VR ticket vending machine, and has a low, inaccessible 26.5 centimetres (10.4 in) high platform. The station building is not open for use by passengers.
