= Pihlajavesi railway station =

Railway station in Keuruu, Finland

Pihlajavesi
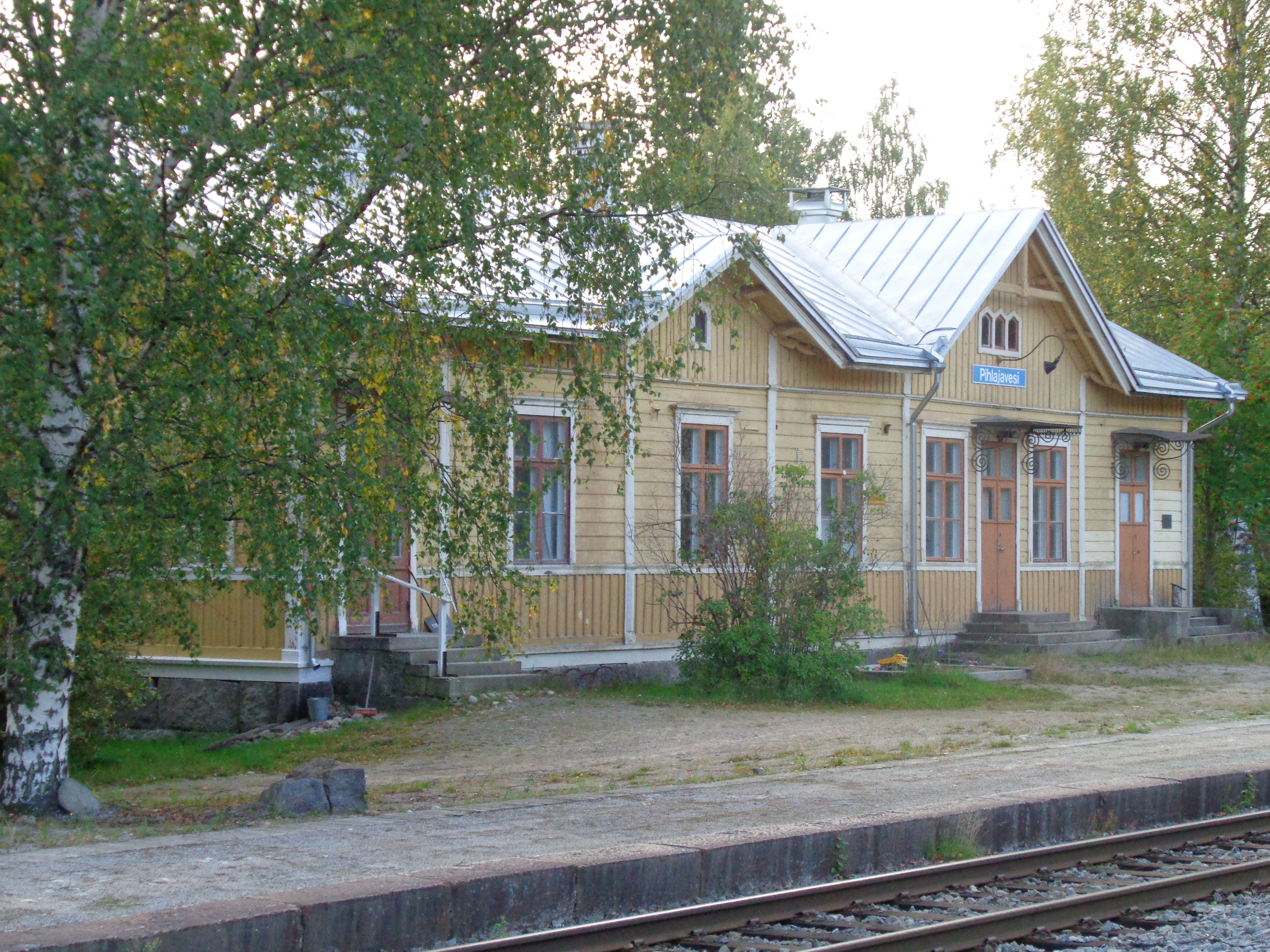

General information
- Location: Valkeajärventie 24, 42910; Pihlajavesi, Keuruu; Finland
- Coordinates: 62°20′46″N 024°23′43″E
- System: VR station
- Owner: Finnish Transport Infrastructure Agency
- Operator: VR Group
- Line: Haapamäki–Seinäjoki
- Platforms: 2
- Tracks: 2

Other information
- Station code: Ph
- Classification: Operating point

History
- Opened: 29 September 1883

Services
Preceding station	VR Group	Following station
Haapamäki Terminus	Haapamäki–Seinäjoki	Myllymäki towards Seinäjoki
Location

The Pihlajavesi railway station (Finnish: Pihlajaveden rautatieasema, Swedish: Pihlajavesi järnvägsstation) is located in the town of Keuruu, Finland (formerly the municipality of Pihlajavesi), in the village of Pihlajavesi. It is located along the Haapamäki–Seinäjoki railway, and its neighboring stations are Haapamäki in the south and Myllymäki in the north.

== History ==
During the building of the Tampere–Vaasa railway, the municipal authorities of Pihlajavesi made an appeal to the Railway Administration for the opening of a station in its territory. It cited the long distance between the stations of Keuruu – contemporarily known as Haapamäki – and Ähtäri, and estate owner Isak Valkeajärvi pledged to donate the land required free of charge. On 28 December 1880, the decision to build a road from the Pihlajavesi church to the future station was made. The project of building a bridge over river Koipijoki proved controversial among the estate owners of the municipality. Pihlajavesi became one of the original stations of the railway, being opened on 29 September 1883 as a pysäkki (a station of lower significance, translating to "stop").

=== List of stationmasters ===
The following people served as the stationmasters at Pihlajavesi in 1887–1970:

- Johan Alfred Holm (1887–1888)
- Karl Alfred Hjelt (1893–1895)
- Johan Ulrik Nörlund (1895–1909)
- Oskar Alarik Gröndahl (1909–1926)
- Väinö Gustaf Nikolainen (1928–1929)
- Edvard Alarik Lybeck (1929–1930)
- Väinö Verneri Louhivaara (1930–1937)
- Hugo Henrik Puusaari (1937–1952)
- Bruuno Vilhelm Helminen (1952–1966)
- Matti Aatami Ravantti (1967–1970)

== Architecture ==
The station building in Pihlajavesi was constructed according to the stock blueprints for the smaller pysäkki stations on the Tampere–Vaasa railway in 1881–1883. After its promotion to a class V station in 1888, it was expanded according to plans from Bruno Granholm in 1902. Some of the finer details of the design have been simplified and the doors changed since then, though the design is still reflective of its state in 1902. The station building suffered a fire in the 1980s, which prompted the construction and use of a temporary "shipping container" building until the original station was repaired.

== Services ==
VR Group operates two daily regional train services in each direction on the route Jyväskylä–Seinäjoki, all of which call in Pihlajavesi. These services are operated with Dm12 railbuses. The station does not have ticketings services nor a VR ticket vending machine, though it does have 55 centimetres (22 in) high platforms. The station building is not open for use by passengers.

== See also ==
- Haapamäki railway station
