= Lake Pihlajavesi =

Lake Pihlajavesi may refer to following places in Finland:

- Pihlajavesi (Saimaa), a major lake basin in Saimaa
- Pihlajavesi (Keuruu), a lake in Pihlajavesi, Keuruu

== See also ==
- Pihlajavesi (disambiguation)
