= Isokyrö railway station =

Railway station in Isokyrö, Finland

Isokyrö Storkyro
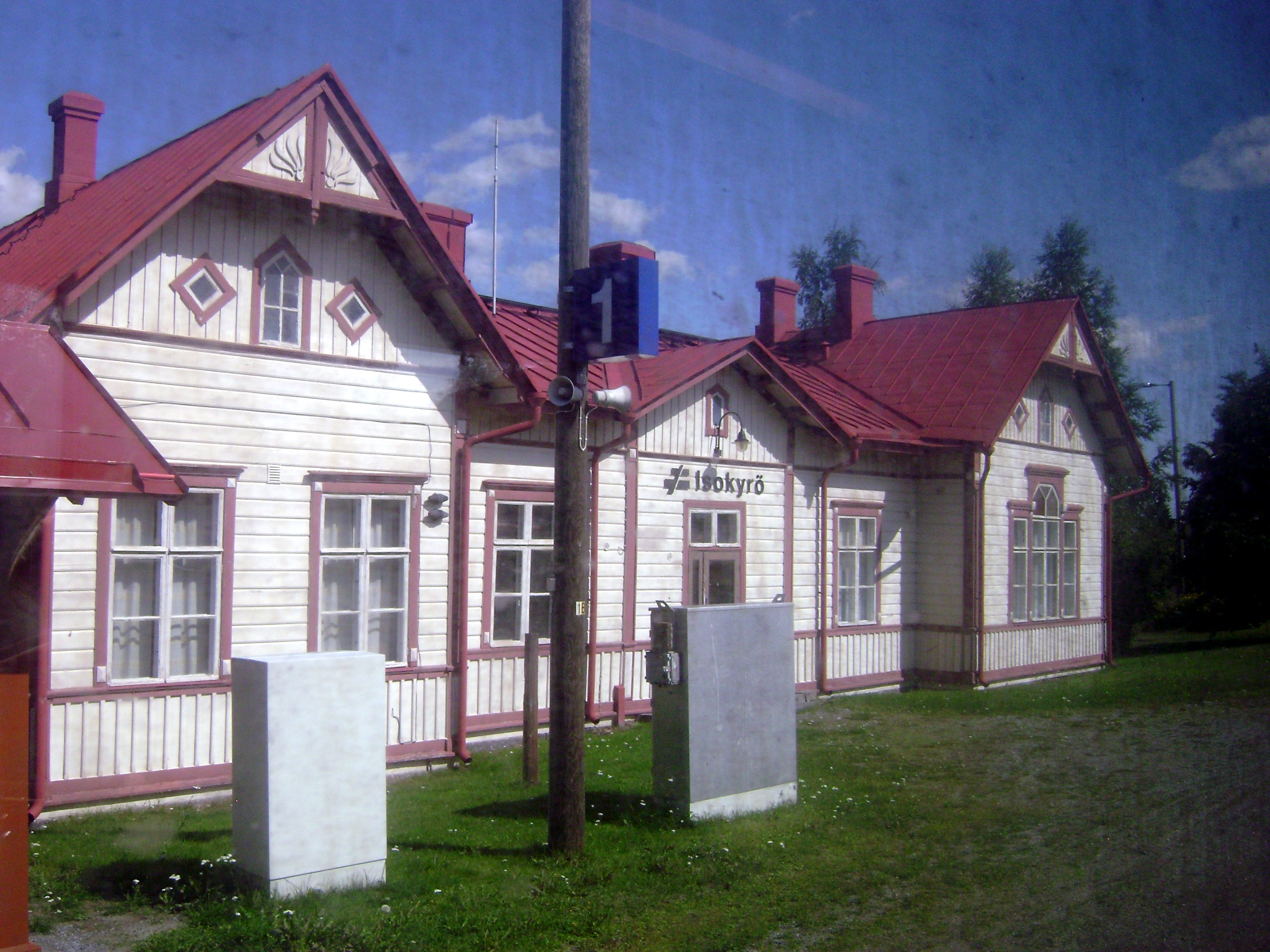

General information
- Location: Asemakuja 17, 61550; Orismala, Isokyrö; Finland
- Coordinates: 62°57′04.6″N 022°23′41.4″E
- System: Closed VR station
- Owner: Finnish Transport Infrastructure Agency
- Operator: VR Group
- Line: Seinäjoki-Vaasa
- Platforms: 2 side platforms
- Tracks: 3

Other information
- Station code: Iky
- Classification: Operating point

History
- Opened: 29 September 1883
- Closed: 20 June 2016

Passengers
- 2008: 13,000

Discontinued services
Preceding station	VR Group	Following station
Ylistaro towards Seinäjoki	Seinäjoki–Vaasa	Tervajoki towards Vaasa
Location

The Isokyrö railway station (Finnish: Isonkyrön rautatieasema, Swedish: Storkyro järnvägsstation) is a closed station located in the municipality of Isokyrö, Finland, in the village of Orismala. It was located along the Seinäjoki–Vaasa railway, and its neighboring stations at the time of closing were Ylistaro in the east and Tervajoki in the west.

== History ==
Isokyrö was opened under the name of Orismala at the same time as the rest of the Seinäjoki–Vaasa line, on 29 September 1883. It was established in the crossing between the railway and the road from the Isokyrö Church to the Orisberg Manor, being named after the latter. Being founded as a pysäkki, it was promoted to a class V station in 1888. A small village formed around the station, and as the former Isokyrö railway station became an unstaffed halt under the name of Ventälä, Orismala was granted the name of the municipality instead. The new Isokyrö in turn became unstaffed in 1989.

Isokyrö remained as a passenger station until 20 June 2016, when it was closed along with Laihia and Ylistaro. VR claims that the closures will allow travel times to be cut by an average of 6 minutes from Vaasa to Seinäjoki and 19 minutes from Vaasa to Helsinki. The company then established a replacement bus service to serve the surroundings the closed stations. This made Tervajoki the only intermediate station used by the InterCity trains between Seinäjoki and Vaasa. Its three-track rail yard remains in use as one of the two passing loops on the section. As of 2020, its platforms remain as well: one low and 150 metres (490 ft) long on the main track, and another high and 110 metres (360 ft) long on the side track. The cross-platform level crossing was dismantled upon the station's closing, however, which allowed the removal of a speed limit restriction around the station.

== Architecture ==
The station building was constructed according to stock blueprints from for the stations on the Vaasa line; it was later expanded with plans from Bruno Granholm. The premises also included a two-spot roundhouse, which was dismantled in 1922. The station building and its related buildings were transferred under the ownership of Senate Properties and put up for sale in 2007.
