= Orivesi railway station =

Railway station in Orivesi, Finland

Orivesi
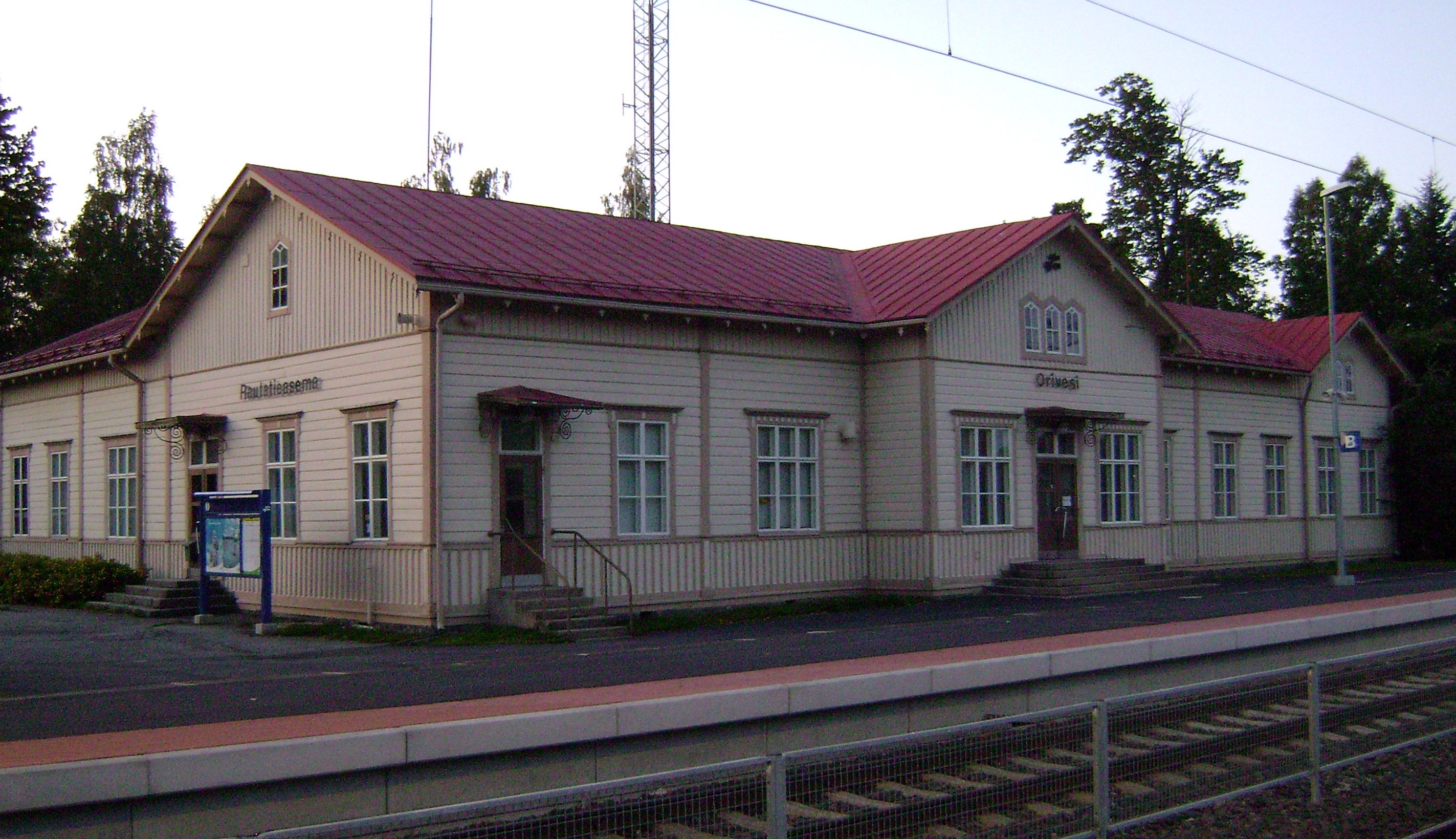

General information
- Location: Asematie 17, 35100; Orivesi; Finland
- Coordinates: 61°39′1″N 24°22′7″E
- System: VR station
- Owner: Finnish Transport Infrastructure Agency

Construction
- Structure type: ground station

Other information
- Fare zone: E

Services
Preceding station	VR Group	Following station
through to Tampere	Orivesi–Jyväskylä	Jämsä towards Jyväskylä
Tampere Terminus	Tampere–Haapamäki	Orivesi Central towards Haapamäki
Location

The Orivesi railway station is located in the town of Orivesi, Finland. The class IV station was built during the years 1881 to 1883. The station has been renewed several times, but the station building has remained almost unchanged in appearance. Some of the buildings in the station were transferred from Terijoki in the 1920s. The station is a crossing point between the tracks from Tampere to Haapamäki and the tracks from Orivesi to Jyväskylä.

== History ==
The construction of the Tampere–Vaasa railway through Orivesi was initiated in June 1879. At the same time, however, there was still a dispute about the alignment of the line in the Orivesi area. On 28 July 1879, the Orivesi municipal assembly proposed that the railway should be built through Hieta, Pappila and the Orivesi parish village. The advantages of the railway line were seen in that in Pappila, the present station area, there would be a connection to the ships operating on lake Längelmävesi, and in the parish village, the railway would cross with the main roads. Juho Hörtsänä of Onnistaipale and Kalle Säynäjoki and Juha Kauppi of Yliskylä demanded that the railway be routed from Siitama directly to Hirsilä, on the western side of the parish village, and refused to donate 40 sleepers per mantal to the construction site, as had been agreed between the residents to financially support the construction work. In their view, a significant amount of arable farmland would be ruined by the planned line; on the other hand, the alignment proposed by them would have passed through their forests, additionally expediting the transportation of timber. The position of the majority eventually prevailed and it was decided to build the line as originally proposed by the municipal assembly. The railway was planned to be opened for traffic in 1883, but it was completed ahead of schedule and provisional traffic could start in Orivesi on 22 November 1882. The official inauguration ceremony was held on 23 September 1883.

In addition to the railway line, the location of the stations was also a matter of debate. The Railway Administration proposed that the Orivesi station be built in Pappila, but the municipal assembly set a demand on 14 October 1879 that the station be built in the parish village. However, the Administration did not give in to this demand and built the station according to its original plan in Pappila between 1881 and 1883. In the same decade, the name of the Orivesi station became a topic of discussion. There was a proposal to rename it to Pappila, which would have allowed the Oripohja station in the parish village to be given the Orivesi name instead, but the changes were never realized.

Demands to build a siding from the Orivesi station to the village's harbour on the Längelmävesi sprung up in the 1880s, though it was not built immediately. In 1888, Antti Mattila, a land merchant and peasant representative from Längelmäki, submitted a petition to the Diet of Finland for the construction of a railway connection. Construction work started very quickly and the 500 metres (1,600 ft) line was completed on 15 September 1890. Orivesi became a junction station on 1 December 1946 as the first section of the current Orivesi-Jyväskylä line to Torkkeli was opened for traffic. Later, the line was opened as far as Jämsä, and finally, on 28 May 1978, to Jyväskylä. In the 1930s, a branch line was also planned to Kuhmoinen on the shore of the Päijänne, but the project never received much interest later on and was shelved.

== Architecture ==
The Orivesi station was built according to the type drawings for a Class IV station, but was extended in 1910 and minor alterations were made later; the layout remains intact, however. Around the station there is a small park and a settlement dating to the late 19th century. In the 1920s, more buildings were brought in from Terijoki.

== Departure tracks ==
Orivesi railway station has three platform tracks. Track 3 is unused by the trains that stop at the station.

- Track 1 is used by long-distance trains and railbus services to Tampere.
- Track 2 is used by long-distance trains bound to Jyväskylä and railbus services to Keuruu.
