= Pihlajavesi, Keuruu =

Town in Central Finland

Pihlajavesi
- Former municipality
- Pihlajaveden kunta Pihlajavesi kommun
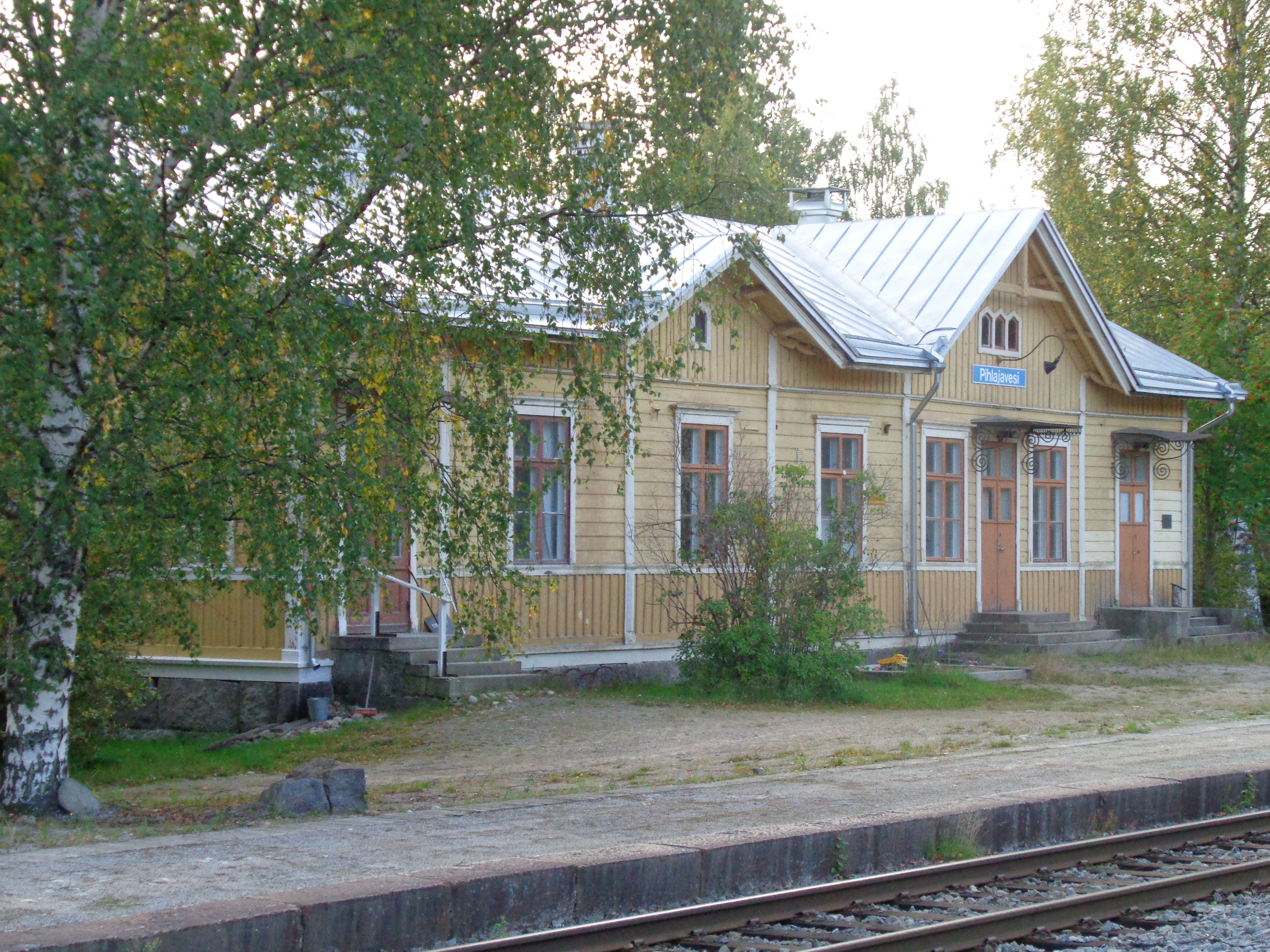
- Pihlajavesi railway station in 2016

- Coat of arms

- Location of Pihlajavesi in Finland
- Coordinates: 62.3452°N 24.3935°E
- Country: Finland
- Region: Central Finland
- Sub-region: Keuruu sub-region
- Municipality: Keuruu (as of 1969)
- Merged: 1969

Area
  - Land: 416 km^{2} (161 sq mi)

Population (31 December 1968)
  - Total: 1,744
- Time zone: UTC+2 (EET)
  - Summer (DST): UTC+3 (EEST)
- Postal number: 42910
- Area code: 014

Pihlajavesi (historically also known as Pihlainen) is a town and a former municipality of Finland, which in 1969 was merged into the municipality of Keuruu, located in the Central Finland region.

== Geography ==
Pihlajavesi borders Ähtäri, Vilppula, Virrat and Pohjaslahti, and before the municipality merger also bordered Keuruu. At the time of the merger, the population of Pihlajavesi was over 1,700 people, but this has since then decreased to under 500, although in the summer months the number increases significantly due to holiday-makers and owners of summer residences.

The eponymous Lake Pihlajavesi is located within the municipality, and connects via Lake Tarjanne to the Kokemäenjoki basin, which drains into the Bothnian Sea.

== History ==
Pihlajavesi has existed at least since the early 17th century. Its name is derived from the nearby lake's name, which literally means "rowan water". The rowan (pihlaja) is an uncommon tree in the area, which is most likely why this name was chosen for the lake. The settlement was initially a part of the Ruovesi parish until Keuruu was separated from it in the 1630s. Under Keuruu, Pihlajavesi gained chapel rights in 1831. It became a separate parish and municipality in 1910, remaining separate until 1969.

== Amenities ==
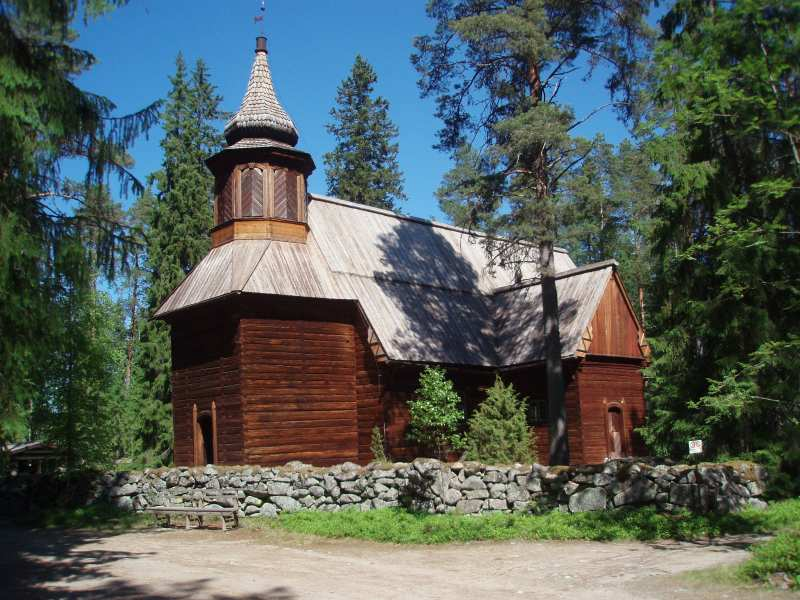
Pihlajavesi Old Church

There are two Lutheran churches in Pihlajavesi. The old church, designed by Matti Åkerblom and built in the early 1780s, is located in the forest outside the main populated areas, and is often referred to as the Erämaakirkko (lit. 'Wilderness church'). It has been designated and protected by the Finnish Heritage Agency as a nationally important built cultural environment (Valtakunnallisesti merkittävä rakennettu kulttuuriympäristö).

The new church, designed by Ernst Lohrmann and built in 1869–1871, is nowadays the main operational church of the parish.

There is a primary school in Pihlajavesi, but for secondary education pupils to travel to the centre of Keuruu.

For passenger traffic, Pihlajavesi is served by the Pihlajavesi station on the Haapamäki–Seinäjoki railway line.

== Notable people ==
Notable people originating from Pihlajavesi include:

- Anton Collin, cross-country skier
- Väinö Kallio, member of parliament
- Erkki Kanerva, member of parliament
- A. V. Koskimies, linguist and writer
- Heikki Nurmio, soldier and writer
- Matti Raivio, cross-country skier
