= Ylistaro railway station =

Railway station in Seinäjoki, Finland

Ylistaro
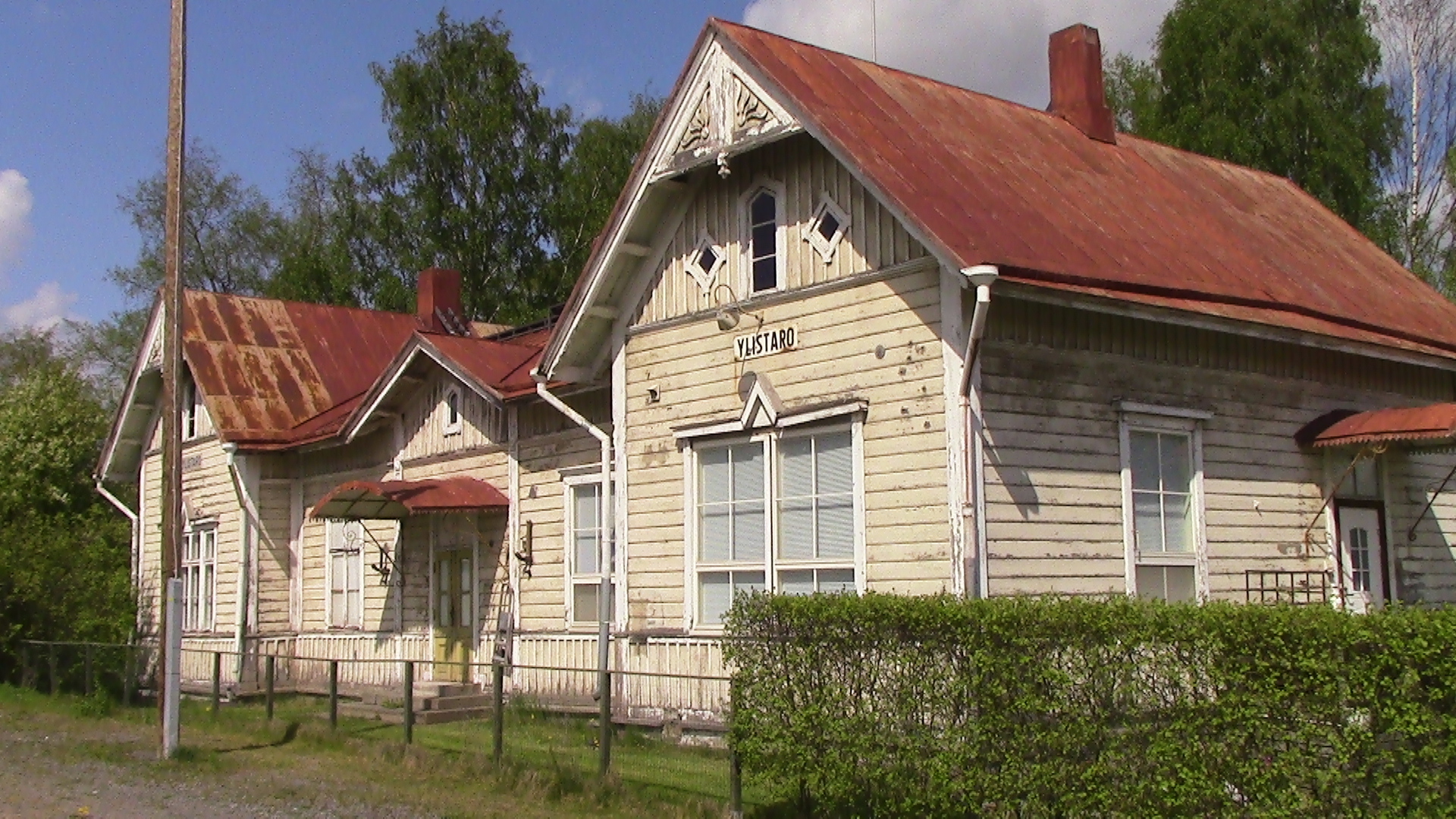

General information
- Location: Möllintie 1, 61410; Ylistaron asemanseutu, Ylistaro; Finland
- Coordinates: 62°55′05″N 022°31′58″E
- System: Closed VR station
- Owner: Finnish Transport Infrastructure Agency
- Operator: VR Group
- Line: Seinäjoki-Vaasa
- Platforms: 1 side platform

Other information
- Station code: Yst
- Classification: Halt

History
- Opened: 29 September 1883
- Closed: 20 June 2016

Passengers
- 2008: 13,000

Discontinued services
Preceding station	VR Group	Following station
Seinäjoki Terminus	Seinäjoki–Vaasa	Isokyrö towards Vaasa
Location

The Ylistaro railway station (Finnish: Ylistaron rautatieasema, Swedish: Ylistaro järnvägsstation) is a closed station located in the city of Seinäjoki (formerly the municipality of Ylistaro), Finland, in the village of Ylistaron asemanseutu. It was located along the Seinäjoki–Vaasa railway, and its neighboring stations at the time of closing were Seinäjoki in the east and Isokyrö in the west.

== History ==
Ylistaro was opened under the name of Kaukola at the same time as the rest of the Seinäjoki–Vaasa line, on 29 September 1883. Just five years later, it was elevated from the status of a pysäkki to that of a class V station, and was renamed Ylistaro after the municipality in which it was located. Owing to the station being located quite far away from the surroundings of the Ylistaro Church, a village of its own grew around it. The two villages had merged to form one urban area by the end of the 1990s.

Ylistaro was made an unstaffed station in 1982 and its freight transport services were ceased in 1999, which prompted the dismantling of its rail yard in the year after.It remained as a passenger station until 20 June 2016, when it was closed along with Laihia and Isokyrö. VR claims that the closures will allow travel times to be cut by an average of 6 minutes from Vaasa to Seinäjoki and 19 minutes from Vaasa to Helsinki. The company then established a replacement bus service to serve the surroundings the closed stations. This made Tervajoki the only intermediate station used by the InterCity trains between Seinäjoki and Vaasa.

== Architecture ==
The station building was constructed according to stock blueprints for the pysäkki stations on the Vaasa railway in 1881–1883. It was expanded from both ends in 1893 according to a design from Bruno Granholm. The stations of the Vaasa line, presumed to have been designed by Knut Nylander, marked a shift towards Neo-Renaissance in style.

The station still has a parking zone, as well as a low, 177 metres (581 ft) long side platform.
