= Haapamäki–Seinäjoki railway =

Railway line in Finland

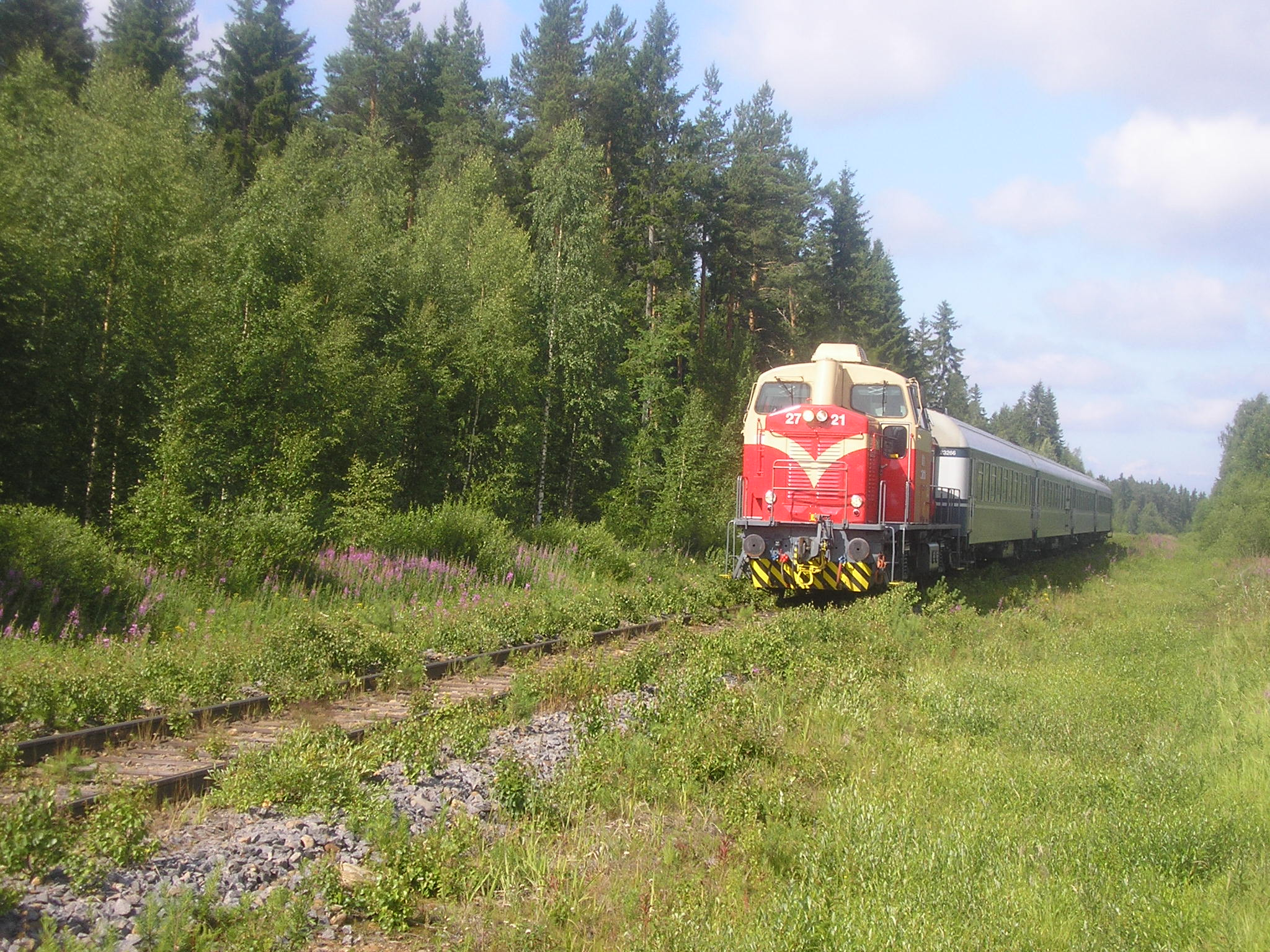
- A Dv12-pulled regional train between Alavus and Tuuri

Overview
- Status: Open
- Owner: Finnish government
- Locale: Central Finland; South Ostrobothnia
- Termini: Haapamäki; Seinäjoki
- Continues from: Tampere–Haapamäki railway

Service
- Operator(s): VR Group

History
- Opened: 22 November 1882

Technical
- Line length: 117.9 km (73.3 mi)
- Number of tracks: 1
- Track gauge: 1,524 mm (5 ft)
- Electrification: None
- Operating speed: 100 km/h (62 mph)

The Haapamäki–Seinäjoki railway is a railway running between the Haapamäki railway station and the Seinäjoki railway station in Finland. It is part of the historical Tampere–Vaasa railway; its other segments as known today include Tampere–Haapamäki and Seinäjoki–Vaasa.

== Overview ==
The Haapamäki–Seinäjoki railway stretches approximately 117.9 kilometres (73.3 mi) long, connecting the regions of Central Finland and South Ostrobothnia. It consists of one track for its entire length, and is unelectrified.

== History ==
The construction of the Tampere–Vaasa railway became relevant towards the end of the 1870s. In 1877-1878, the line was confirmed, and the formal decision to build the line was made during the concurrent session of the Diet of Finland. The construction was initiated in 1879; the section between Vaasa and Alavus was opened for provisional traffic on 10 November 1882, and the Tampere–Alavus segment followed on November 22. In September 1883, the railway was formally inaugurated and transferred under the ownership of the Railway Administration.

== Services ==
VR Group operates two daily regional train services in each direction on the route Jyväskylä–Seinäjoki, as well as two additional services per direction between Seinäjoki and Ähtäri. On the Haapamäki–Seinäjoki line, these services call in Pihlajavesi, Myllymäki, Eläinpuisto-Zoo, Ähtäri, Tuuri and Alavus.
