= Pihlajavesi =

Pihlajavesi may refer to the following places in Finland:

- Pihlajavesi (Saimaa), a major basin in Saimaa
- Pihlajavesi, Keuruu, former municipality and current northwestern part of Keuruu
- Pihlajavesi (Keuruu), a lake in Pihlajavesi, Keuruu
