= Pihlajavesi Old Church =

- Pihlajavesi Old Church
- Pihlajavesi Wilderness Church
- Finnish: Pihlajaveden vanha kirkko (Pihlajaveden erämaakirkko)
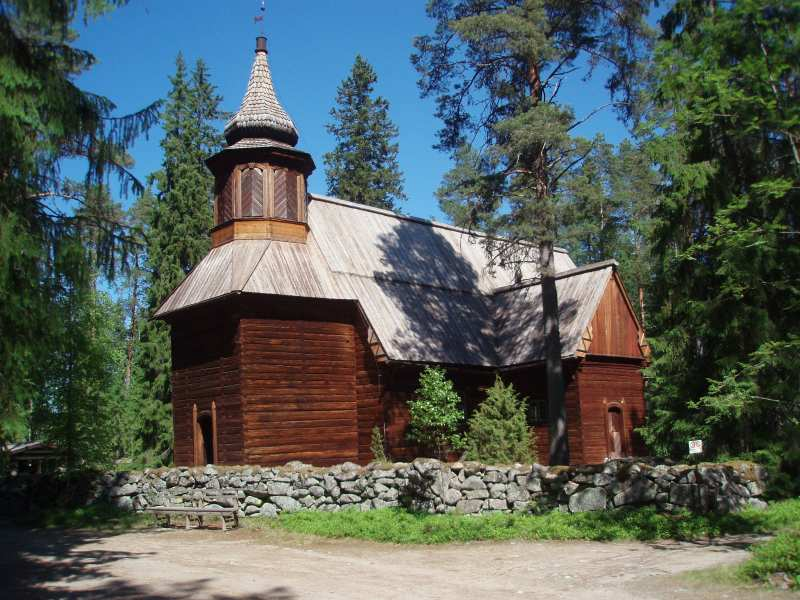
- Church pictured in 2007
- Pihlajavesi Old Church
- 62.3633°N 24.3583°E
- Location: Pihlajavesi, Keuruu
- Country: Finland
- Denomination: Lutheran

History
- Status: Parish church
- Consecrated: 1787

Architecture
- Functional status: Seasonal use
- Architect: Matti Åkerblom
- Architectural type: Finnish traditional
- Years built: 1780 — c. 1783

Specifications
- Capacity: 300
- Materials: Timber

Administration
- Diocese: Diocese of Lapua
- Parish: Keuruu Parish

Pihlajavesi Old Church (Finnish: Pihlajaveden vanha kirkko), also known as Pihlajavesi Wilderness Church (Finnish: Pihlajaveden erämaakirkko), is a Lutheran church in the town of Pihlajavesi, in Central Finland. It is called 'Wilderness Church', because it is situated in a forest outside the main populated areas.

== Background ==
Pihlajavesi formed part of the large Ruovesi parish, and travel to the nearest church was difficult due to lack of roads in the area; therefore the populace petitioned the Archdiocese of Turku cathedral chapter for a permission to build their own local chapel and cemetery. The request was granted, but during the design and construction phase what was originally intended as a small prayer room gradually grew into a full-blown church, which the permission did not allow. The Diocese complained and admonished the Kirkkoherra (Vicar) of Keuruu over this unlicensed development, initially refusing to sanction its use, but allowed the building to remain and eventually consecrated it as a church in 1787.

When a new, larger and more modern church was built in Pihlajavesi in 1870, the old church was abandoned and fell into such disrepair that it was scheduled for demolition. It was, however, rediscovered and renovated in the 1920s, followed by a replacement roof installed in 1966.

The church is not heated, and therefore mostly used during the summer months, when it is popular as a wedding church and a venue for small-scale concerts and events.

== Architecture ==
The church was designed and built 1780—1783 by a notable church builder of the time, Matti Åkerblom, who also built the Ruovesi Church, the main church of the then parish.

It is of timber construction, with the massive logs unclad both on the exterior and interior sides. There is an integral bell tower under a wood shingle roof, at the western end of the building, above the entrance. The church is a notable example of 18th-century Finnish church design, and of the 'long church' (pitkäkirkko) style typical to parts of the southern and western Finland. It is also revealing of timber construction methods of the time, especially thanks to the unlined wall and ceiling structures.

The church and its surrounding milieu have been designated and protected by the Finnish Heritage Agency as a nationally important built cultural environment (Valtakunnallisesti merkittävä rakennettu kulttuuriympäristö).

Somewhat unusually, the church has never had an altarpiece or housed any other church art.

== Gallery ==
Interior views
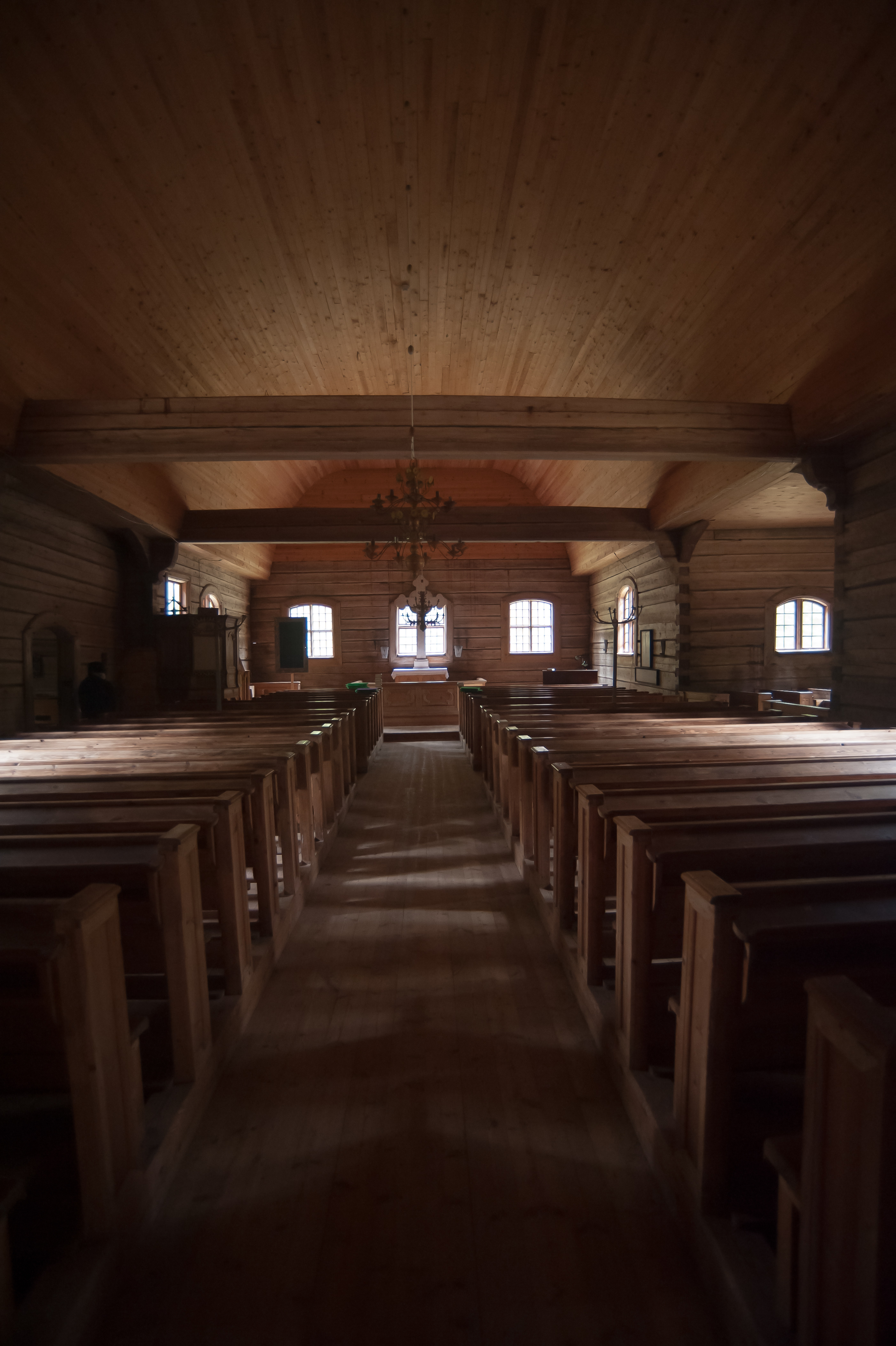
Aisle, viewed from the entrance towards the altar

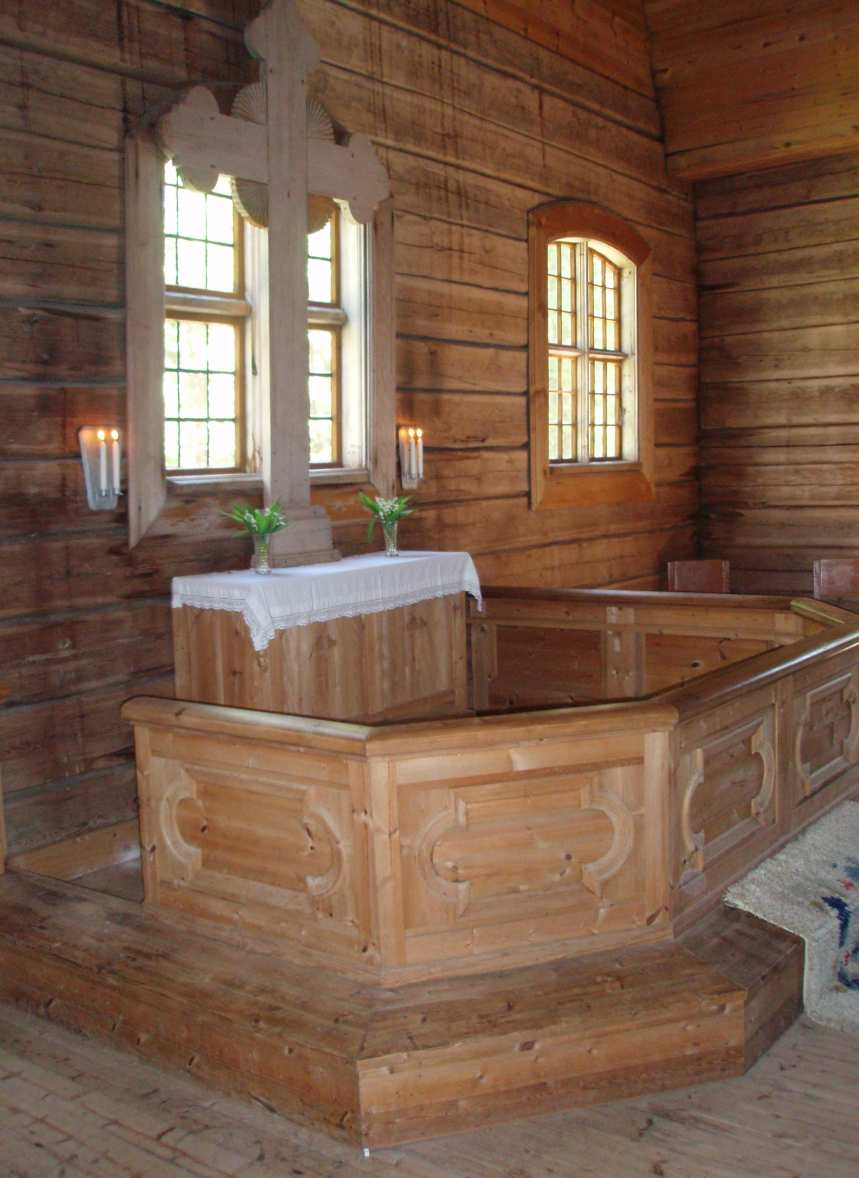
Altar

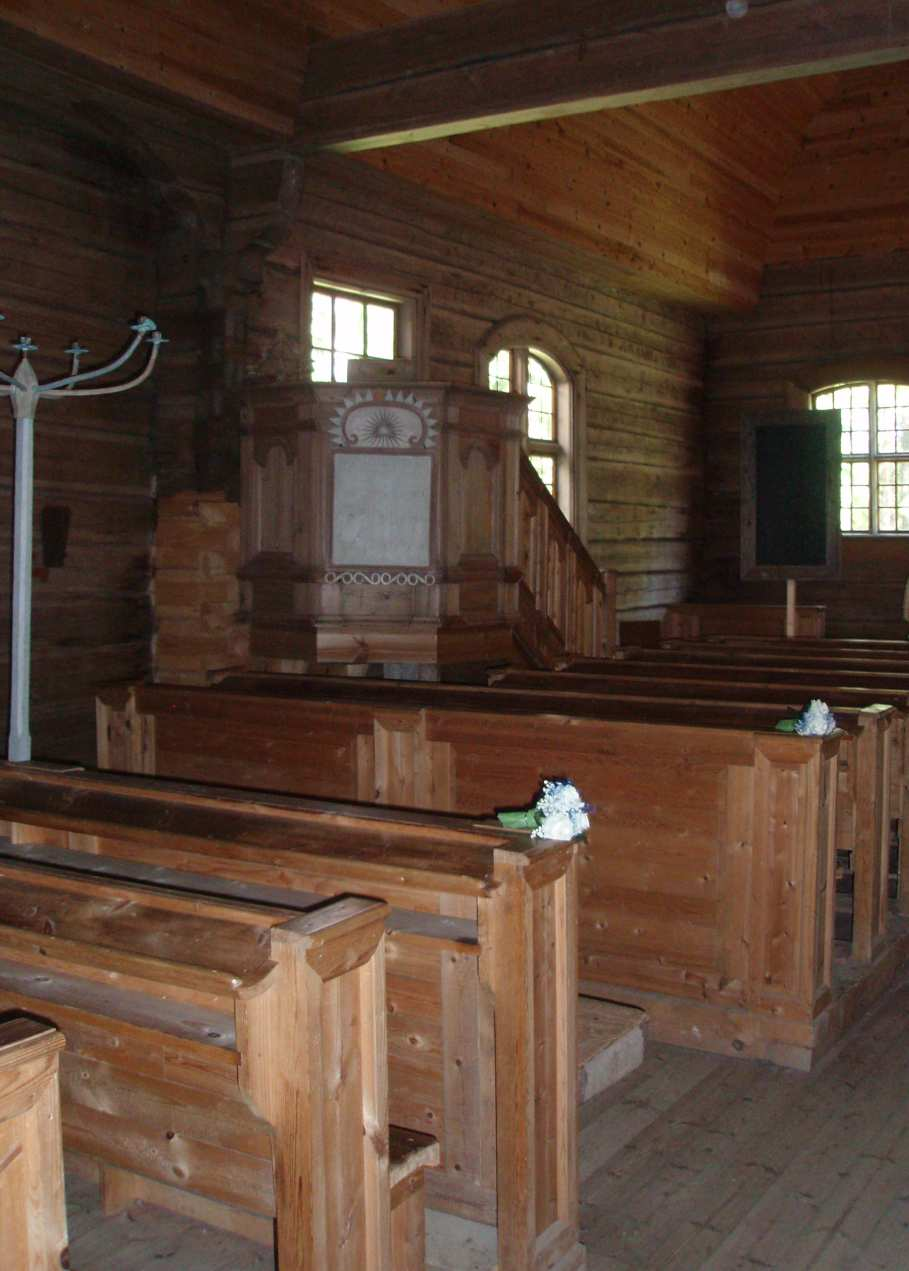
Pulpit
