= Orivesi–Jyväskylä railway =

Railway line in Finland

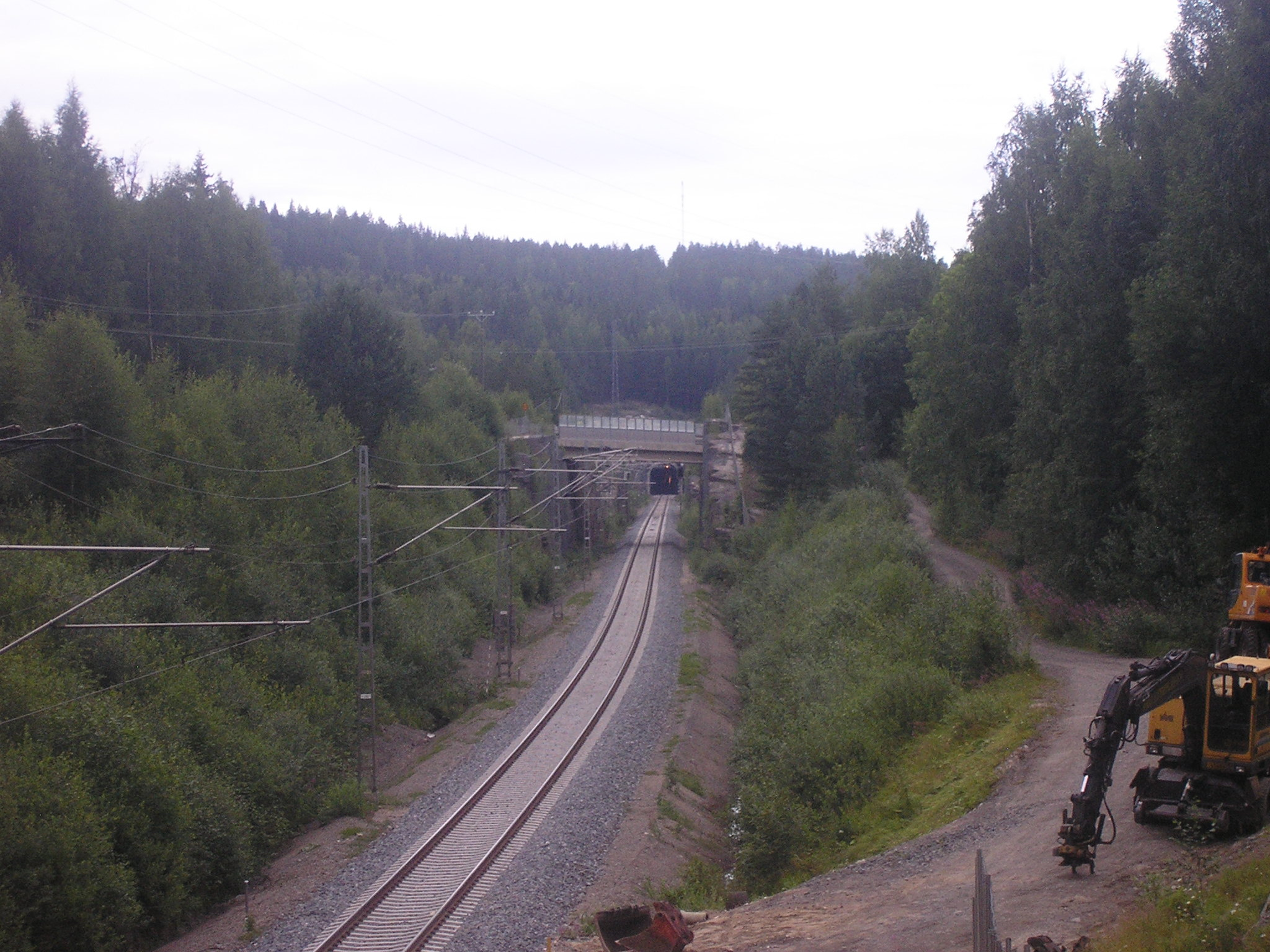
- The railway in Muurame, with the Paasivuori tunnel in the background

Overview
- Status: Open
- Owner: Finnish government
- Locale: Pirkanmaa; Central Finland
- Termini: Orivesi; Jyväskylä

Service
- Operator(s): VR Group

History
- Opened: 1977
- Passenger services initiated: 1978

Technical
- Line length: 166 km (103 mi)
- Number of tracks: 1
- Track gauge: 1,524 mm (5 ft)
- Electrification: 25 kV @ 50 Hz
- Operating speed: 120–160 km/h (75–99 mph)

The Orivesi–Jyväskylä railway (Finnish: Orivesi–Jyväskylä-rata, Swedish: Orivesi–Jyväskylä-banan), also called the Jämsä railway (Finnish: Jämsän rata, Swedish: Jämsäbanan) is a 1,524 mm (5 ft) railway in Finland, running between the Orivesi and Jyväskylä stations.

== History ==
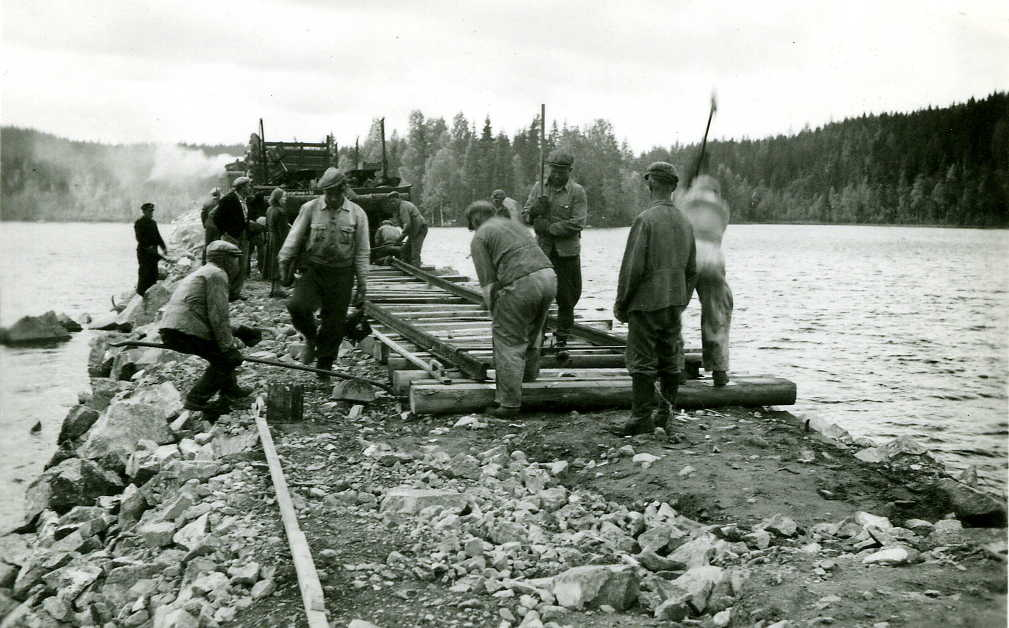
The line under construction in 1950

=== Orivesi to Jämsä ===
The section from Orivesi to Jämsä was ordered to be built in 1938. The approval was influenced by Rudolf Walden, who promised that the Yhtyneet Paperitehtaat (now UPM-Kymmene) factories would contribute towards covering the costs. Construction began in 1939 and continued during the war years, partly with labour from prisoners of war. The 56 kilometres (35 mi) long line to Jämsä was completed in 1950 and the extension to the Jämsänkoski mills, the costs of which were split half and half between the state and Yhtyneet Paperitehtaat, followed in 1951. The line from Jämsä to Olkkola on the shore of lake Päijänne was completed in 1953. On average, 300 people worked on the line each year, peaking at over 700 at times. The line demanded the construction of numerous bridges, curves and embankments, thanks to the complicated terrain it passes through. The railway and its branches were needed to transport raw wood from the Päijänne area, as well as products of the growing wood processing industry in the Jämsänjoki valley. Partly thanks to the railway, the Jämsänkoski paper mill later became accompanied by another in Kaipola, as well as a sawmill in Olkkola. The sidings also served passenger traffic. The volume of traffic, peaking in the mid-1960s, quickly collapsed by the end of the decade and passenger services were discontinued in 1969. By the 1970s, the line's traffic dwindled to a few freight trains a day.

=== Jämsä to Jyväskylä ===
Plans to extend the line to Jyväskylä began immediately, as it would significantly shorten the rail connections between central and southern Finland. After lengthy studies and research, the decision to build the line was made in 1961. Construction began in 1964, with the Keljonlahti harbour siding and the Säynätsalo line being completed in 1968 and 1970 respectively. The track was built in a difficult terrain surrounded by multiple bodies of water and with large differences in altitude. As a result, 15 kilometres (9.3 mi) of the 53 kilometres (33 mi) track had to be excavated into bedrock. The total length of the tunnels amounts to 9.55 kilometres (5.93 mi), and a total of 48 bridges were built. The construction process took 13 years.

The main track from Jyväskylä to Jämsä was completed in late 1977, when it was opened for freight traffic. Passenger services started in 1978. The line shortened the train journey from Jyväskylä to Tampere from 190 kilometres (120 mi) to 154 kilometres (96 mi). In 1980, for example, about 20 trains a day were running on the line. In 1984, 51.8 million net tonne-kilometers of freight were carried between Jyväskylä and Jämsä in the direction of Jämsä and 31.2 million in the direction of Jyväskylä. On the Orivesi-Jämsä route, the figures were 56.5 to Orivesi and 33.8 to Jämsä.
