= Lapua railway station =

Railway station in Lapua, Finland

Lapua Lappo
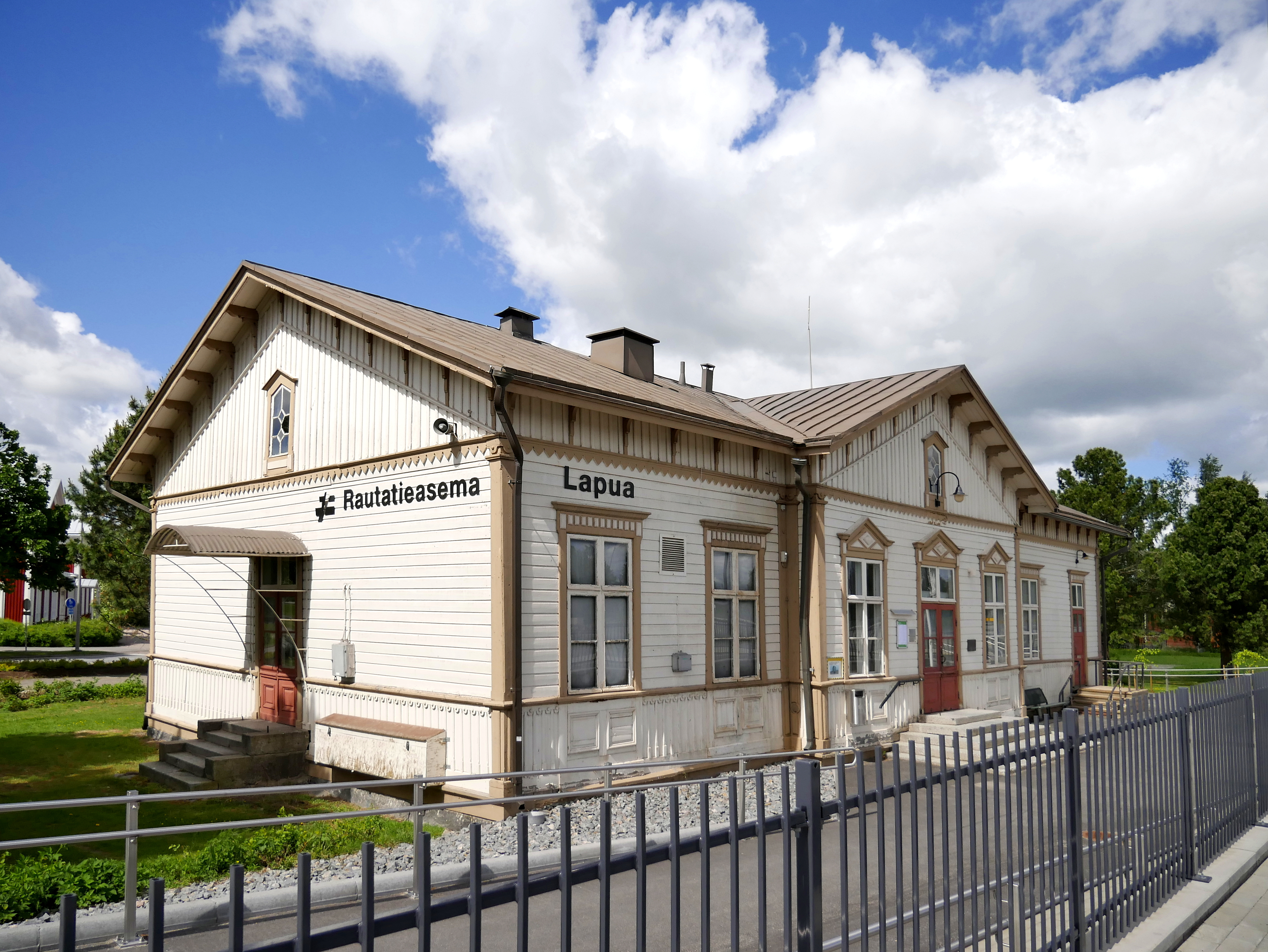

General information
- Location: Asemakatu 7, 62100; Lapua; Finland
- Coordinates: 62°58′16″N 023°00′50″E
- System: VR station
- Owner: Finnish Transport Infrastructure Agency
- Operator: VR Group
- Line: Seinäjoki–Oulu
- Platforms: 1 side platform

Construction
- Architect: Knut Nylander

Other information
- Station code: Lpa
- Classification: Operating point

History
- Opened: 11 January 1886

Passengers
- 2008: 38,000

Services
Preceding station	VR Group	Following station
Seinäjoki Terminus	Seinäjoki–Oulu	Kauhava towards Oulu
Seinäjoki towards Helsinki	Helsinki–Kolari (overnight service)	Kauhava towards Kolari
Location
- Location within South Ostrobothnia Location within Finland

The Lapua railway station (Finnish: Lapuan rautatieasema, Swedish: Lappo järnvägsstation) is located in the central urban area of the town of Lapua, Finland. It is located along the Seinäjoki–Oulu railway, and its neighboring stations are Kauhava in the north and Seinäjoki in the south.

== Services ==
Lapua is served by most long-distance trains (InterCity and Pendolino) that use the Seinäjoki–Oulu line as part of their route. In addition, the night trains between Helsinki and Kolari stop at Lapua. All trains arriving to and departing from the station use track 1.
