= Vaskivesi – Visuvesi =

Lake in Finland

Vaskivesi - Visuvesi
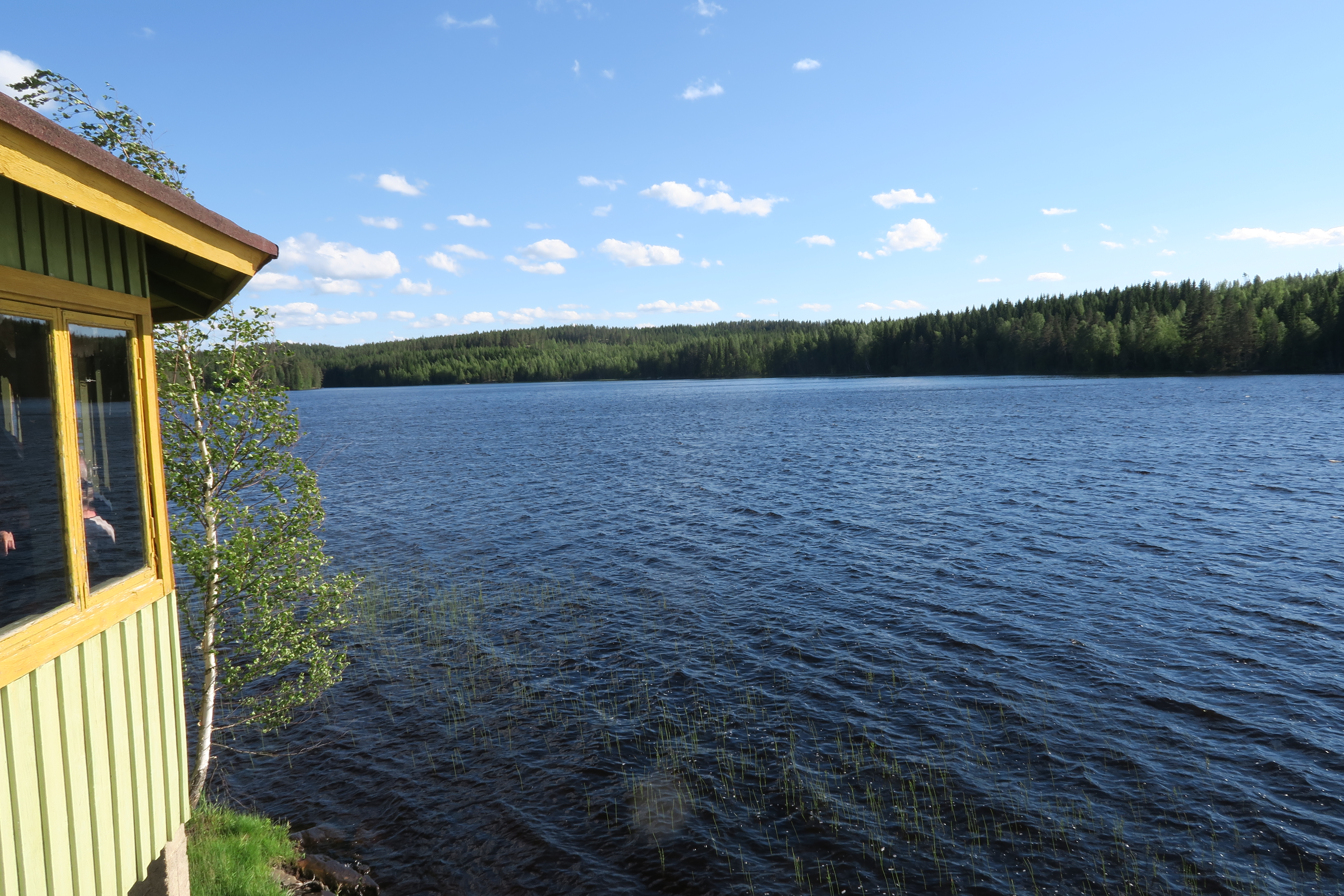

- Location within Finland
- Location: Virrat
- Coordinates: 62°10′N 23°43′E
- Catchment area: Kokemäenjoki
- Basin countries: Finland
- Surface area: 46.222 km^{2} (17.846 sq mi)
- Average depth: 6.95 m (22.8 ft)
- Max. depth: 61.97 m (203.3 ft)
- Water volume: 0.321 km^{3} (260,000 acre⋅ft)
- Shore length^{1}: 319.33 km (198.42 mi)
- Surface elevation: 96.1 m (315 ft)
- Frozen: December–April
- ^{1} Shore length is not a well-defined measure.

Vaskivesi – Visuvesi is a medium-sized lake in Finland. It is situated in the municipality of Virrat in the Pirkanmaa region in western Finland. The lake is part of the Kokemäenjoki basin. The lake drains into the lake Tarjanne in the south.

== See also ==
- List of lakes in Finland
