= Tervajoki railway station =

Railway station in Isokyrö, Finland

Tervajoki
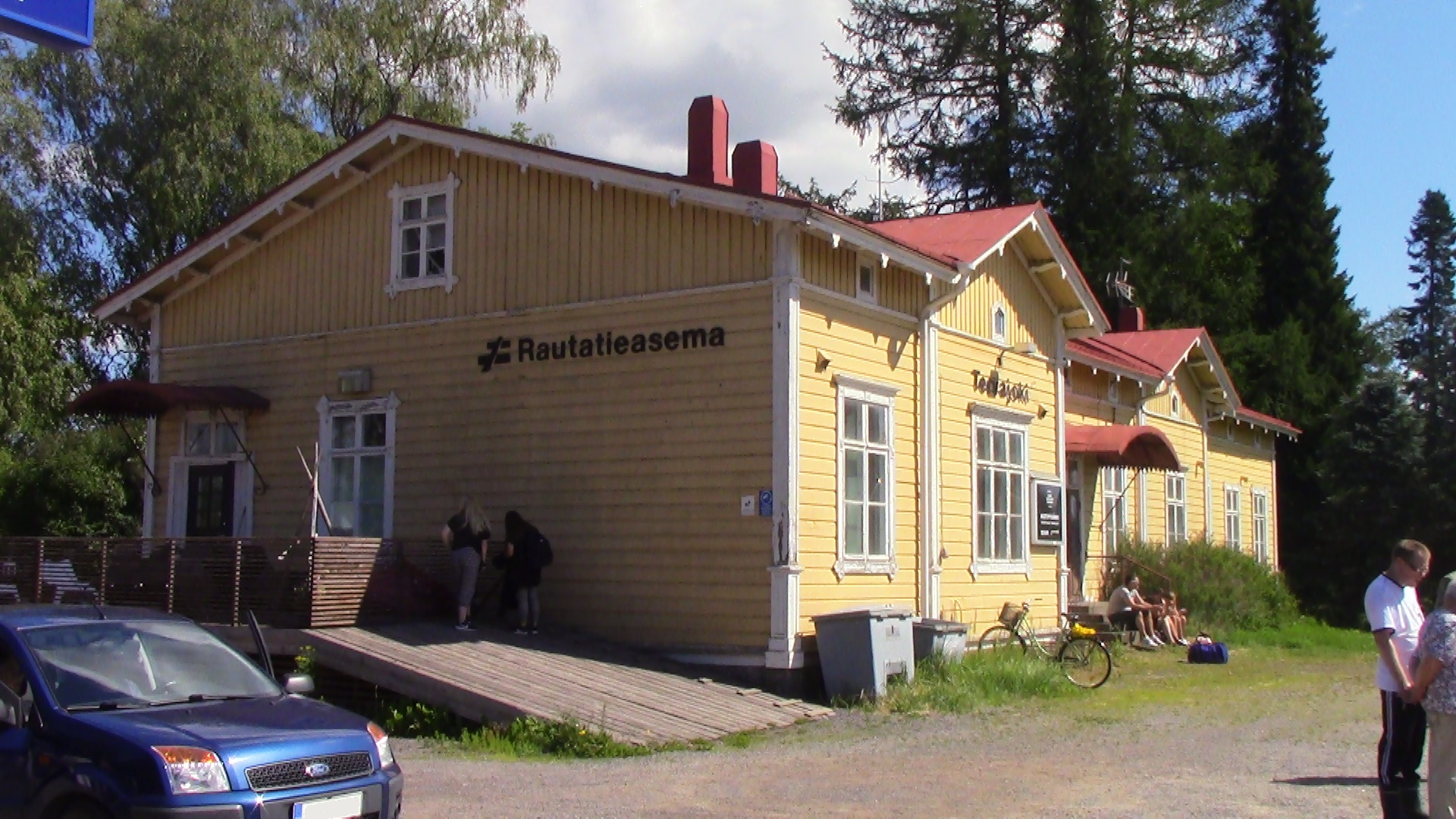

General information
- Location: Parkintie 7, 66440; Tervajoki, Isokyrö; Finland
- Coordinates: 63°00′03″N 022°10′16″E
- System: VR station
- Owner: Finnish Transport Infrastructure Agency
- Operator: VR Group
- Line: Seinäjoki-Vaasa
- Platforms: 1 side platform
- Tracks: 1

Other information
- Station code: Tk
- Classification: Halt

History
- Opened: 29 September 1883

Passengers
- 2008: 27,000

Services
Preceding station	VR Group	Following station
Seinäjoki Terminus	Seinäjoki–Vaasa	Vaasa Terminus
Location
- Location within Ostrobothnia Location within Finland

The Tervajoki railway station (Finnish: Tervajoen rautatieasema, Swedish: Tervajoki järnvägsstation) is located in the municipality of Isokyrö, Finland, in the urban area of Tervajoki (specifically, the village of Kylkkälä). It is located along the Seinäjoki–Vaasa railway, and its neighboring stations are Seinäjoki in the east and Vaasa in the west.

== Services ==
Tervajoki is served by all long-distance trains (InterCity and Pendolino) that use the Seinäjoki–Vaasa line; the routes include Helsinki–Vaasa and Seinäjoki–Vaasa. It is the only intermediate station on the line, after the closings of Laihia, Ylistaro and Isokyrö on 20 June 2016. All trains arriving to and departing from the station use track 1.
