= Matti Åkerblom =

18th-century Finnish church builder

Matti Åkerblom (né Pärnä; 18 July 1740, Eräjärvi — 10 June 1819, Orivesi) was a notable Finnish church designer and builder of the late 18th century, who also held the office of the regional master builder of the Province of Tavastia.

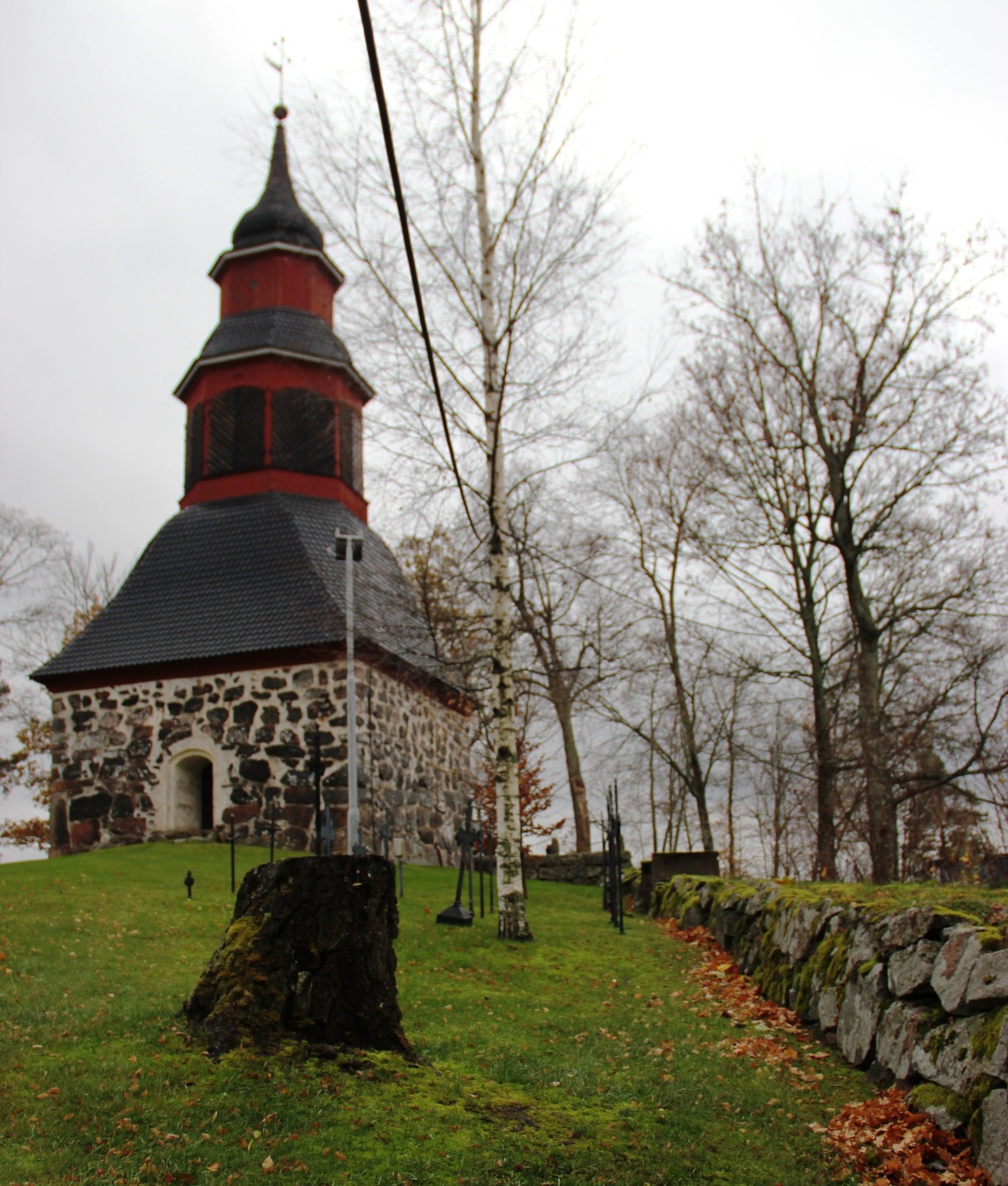
Halikko bell tower, Åkerblom's 1773 master work

Åkerblom first worked as a farm hand, but later decided to train as a carpenter, learning his trade under Antti Piimänen. His training took unusually long, with the apprenticeship and journeymanship stages each lasting five years, before he completed his master work, the bell tower of Halikko Church, in 1773. The master work had not been sanctioned by the guild, but when completed it was nevertheless approved, thus gaining Åkerblom his mastership.

Notable churches built by Åkerblom include Nurmijärvi Church, Pihlajavesi Old Church, Angelniemi Church (completed a year before Åkerblom's master status), Kuorevesi Church and Kuru Church, among others: in total, Åkerblom is known to have designed and built at least ten churches and five bell towers.
