= Tarjanne =

Lake in Finland

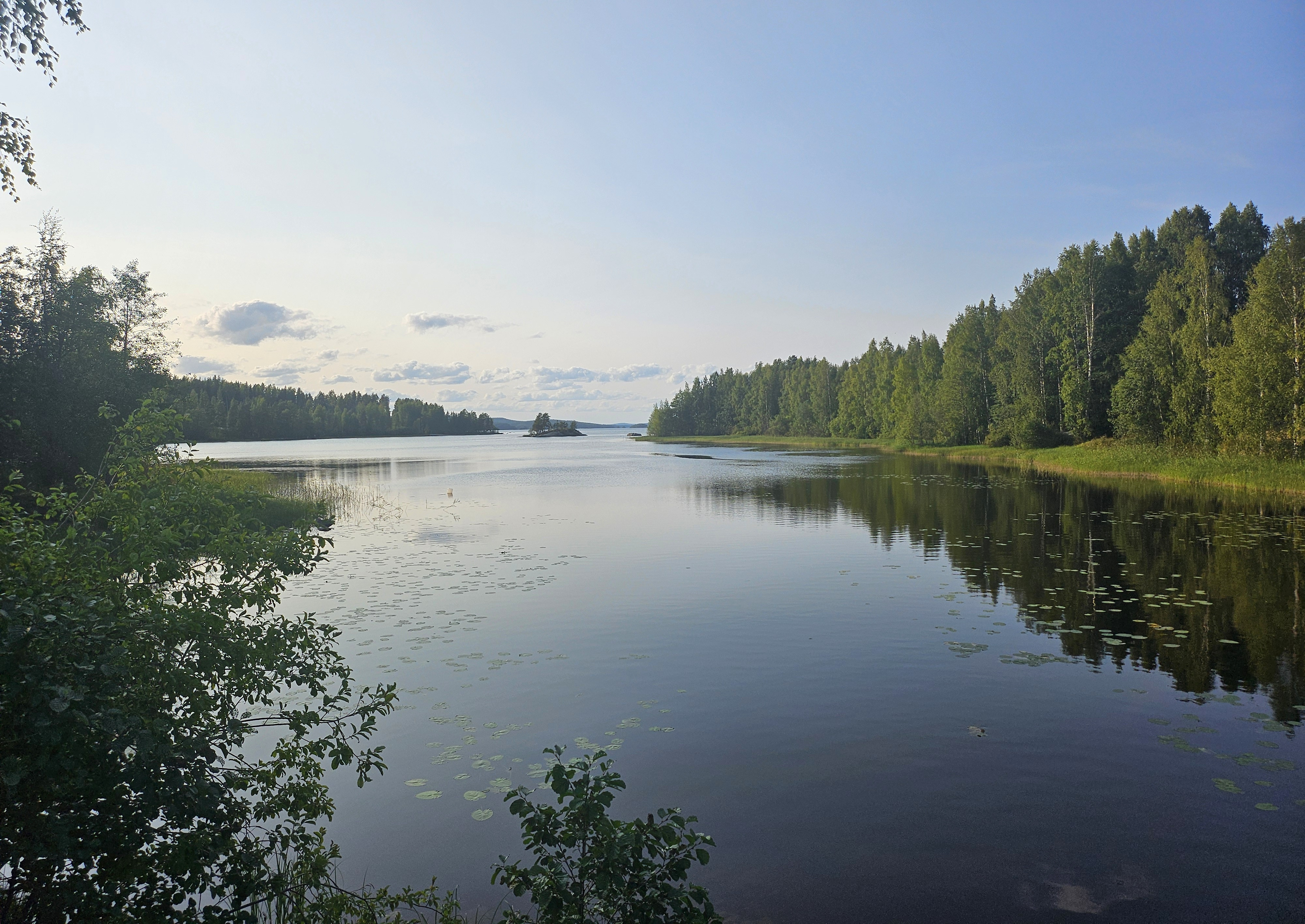

- Location within Finland
- Location: Ruovesi, Virrat, Mänttä-Vilppula
- Coordinates: 62°07′N 24°05′E
- Catchment area: Kokemäenjoki
- Basin countries: Finland
- Surface area: 54.872 km^{2} (21.186 sq mi)
- Average depth: 12.66 m (41.5 ft)
- Max. depth: 67.78 m (222.4 ft)
- Water volume: 0.695 km^{3} (563,000 acre⋅ft)
- Shore length^{1}: 243.18 km (151.11 mi)
- Surface elevation: 96.1 m (315 ft)
- Frozen: December–April
- Islands: Siperia, Monosen Kuusinen, Palosaari, Vannottu, Kauttakala
- ^{1} Shore length is not a well-defined measure.

Tarjanne (also Tarjannevesi) is a medium-sized lake in Finland. It is situated in the municipalities of Ruovesi, Virrat and Mänttä-Vilppula in the Pirkanmaa region in western Finland. The lake is part of the Kokemäenjoki basin. The main inflows are the lake Vaskivesi and a chain of lakes north of it in the west and a chain of lakes from the lake Pihlajavesi in the north. The lake drains into the Lake Ruovesi in the south.

== See also ==
- List of lakes in Finland
