= Haapamäki railway station =

Railway station in Keuruu, Finland

Haapamäki
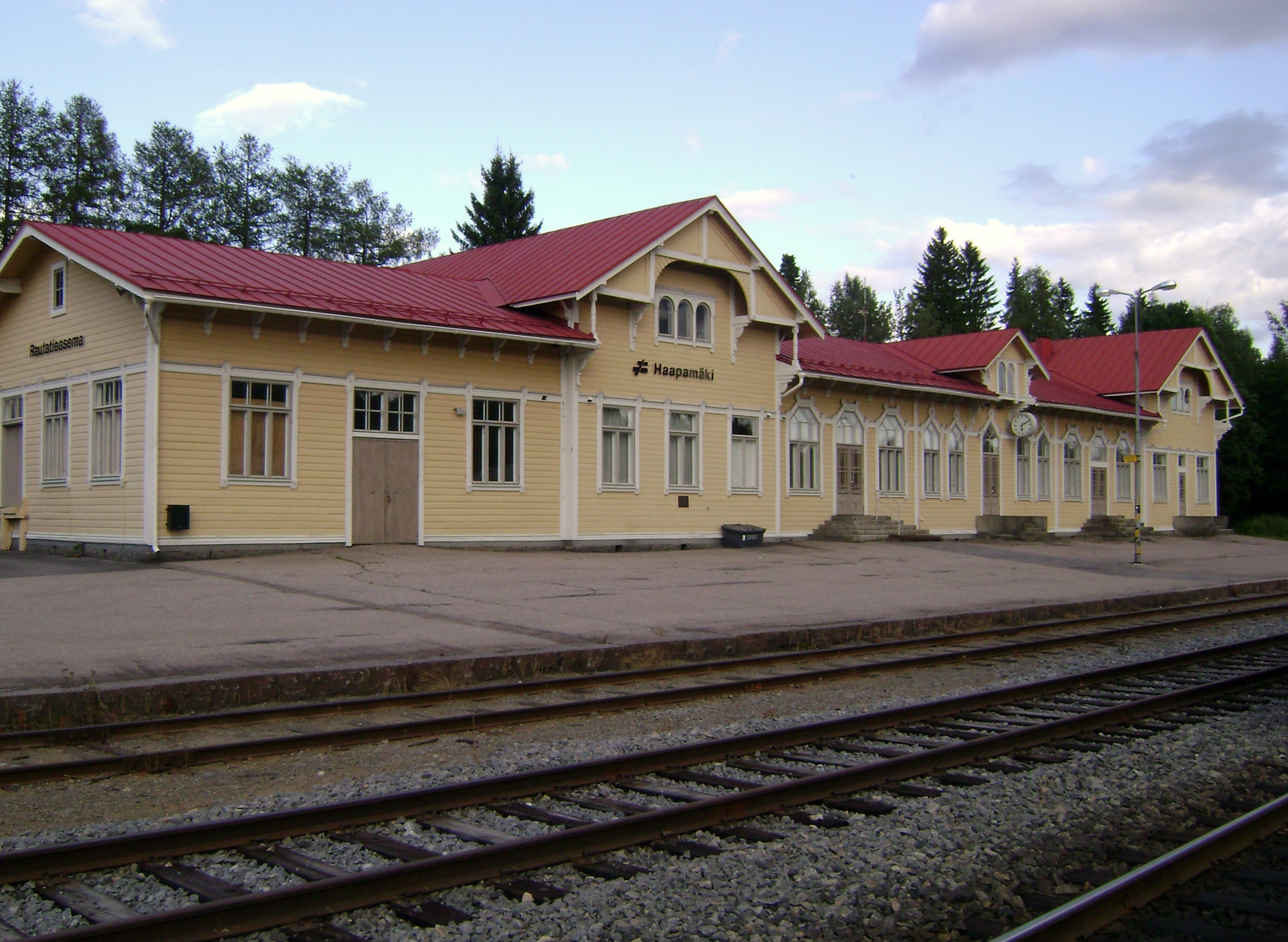

General information
- Location: Asema-aukio 1 Haapamäki, Keuruu; Finland
- Coordinates: 62°14′48″N 024°27′19″E
- System: VR station
- Owner: Finnish Transport Infrastructure Agency
- Operator: VR Group
- Lines: Tampere–Haapamäki; Haapamäki–Jyväskylä; Haapamäki–Seinäjoki

Construction
- Architect: Bruno Granholm

Other information
- Station code: Hpk
- Classification: Operating point

History
- Opened: 29 September 1883
- Former names: Keuru (until 1897)

Passengers
- 2008: 17,000

Services
Preceding station	VR Group	Following station
Kolho towards Tampere	Tampere–Haapamäki	Terminus
Terminus	Haapamäki–Seinäjoki	Pihlajavesi towards Seinäjoki
Terminus	Haapamäki–Jyväskylä	Keuruu towards Jyväskylä
Location
- Location within Central Finland Location within Finland

Haapamäki railway station (abbrev. Hpk, Finnish: Haapamäen rautatieasema) is a junction station in the village of Haapamäki, in Keuruu, Finland. Construction on the railway line from Tampere to Seinäjoki via Haapamäki was finished in 1882. When the railway line to Jyväskylä was built, Haapamäki became a junction station. The fourth line to branch off from Haapamäki was the Pori line, which was built in the 1930s.

This line saw heavy traffic until the 1970s, since all trains heading for Ostrobothnia and Jyväskylä went through Haapamäki. The number of trains heading for Ostrobothnia via Haapamäki dropped off in 1971 when the line from Tampere to Seinäjoki via Parkano was built. The number dropped even further once the Pori line was closed.

== Services ==
Haapamäki is served by railbus services from Seinäjoki to Jyväskylä as well as from Tampere to Keuruu (with one continuing further to Jyväskylä).

== Departure tracks ==
Haapamäki railway station as a total of five platform tracks. Tracks 1–3 are currently unused by passenger trains.

- Track 4 is used by railbus services to Seinäjoki and Jyväskylä
- Track 5 is used by railbus services running between Tampere and Keuruu (or Jyväskylä).

== Construction ==
Haapamäki railway station was built over a two-year period, from 1880 to 1882. At the same time, construction was being started on a rail line between Tampere and Vaasa. Originally, the area around the station was sparsely populated wilderness, but a village quickly sprung up around the station. Beautiful log buildings were built for the stationmaster, the railway guard and other railway personnel. Some of the people building the station also settled down permanently in the village and built themselves houses. The railway enticed merchants to the town as it offered them a substantial shipping advantage. By the time trains started rolling through the station in 1882, a village with several dozen houses had sprung up around the station. Haapamäki never saw any major industry roll into town, as there were no rapids nearby that could be used to generate energy; nor were there any major waterways nearby that could be used for transporting timber to the station.

== Early stages ==
Until the end of the 1800s, Haapamäki railway station's development was quite modest; this was, above all, due to the inability of the merchants to use the railway to their advantage and the municipality's reluctance to develop the station village, which was located far from downtown Keuruu. No wholesale trade ever developed as all the merchants focussed their efforts on retail sales, which proved not to be very profitable in such a small village. In that sense, Haapamäki was geographically in a favorable place for wholesaling as it would have been easy to competitively ship goods to Virrat and Ruovesi in the west and Jyväskylä in the east. The development of the station fell mainly on the shoulders of the Finland's State Railways, as the municipality refused to do anything. A fear of the village center fading away and the station village developing into the new business center was behind the municipality's decision. Furthermore, the majority of Haapamäki's inhabitants were not originally from Keuruu, which perhaps also caused the original residents to be jealous and resentful.

== Becoming a junction station ==
In spite of everything, the area around the station grew faster than downtown Keuruu did. State Railways continually built new housing for its growing staff. As Haapamäki became a junction station, the yard was expanded and a locomotive depot and water tower were built. The track connecting the Ostrobothnian line with the Savo line had already been planned for a long time, but quarrelling about the line pushed back construction. Russia's Ministry of War felt that this line was strategically important and demanded action to be quickly taken to get it built. Haapamäki became a junction station in 1897 when the line to Jyväskylä was established. Downtown Keuruu was along the new line and a station was built there because of it. The new station was christened Keuruu railway station and so the station in Haapamäki, which had been called Keuruu railway station until that point in time, was renamed Haapamäki railway station.

Haapamäki railway station's transformation into a junction station was a major turning point in the development of the station. The number of the State Railways staff at Haapamäki rose to 200. An enormous staff was required to deal with traffic, rolling stock, and the tracks themselves around the clock. Traffic was run from the station, which had several clerks and other workers working there. In addition to the engineer and conductor, trains had a lot of other staff on them, as well. The central storehouse for wood used as fuel for the steam locomotives was located in Haapamäki; this provided work for many locals. The wood was hauled to the station's wood yard by sledge from the surrounding forests and some were even shipped from nearby stations by train. Chopping the wood and loading it into the tender required a large workforce. One load of wood was enough for a train to reach the next loading point after Haapamäki, which were Seinäjoki, Jyväskylä, or Tampere in this case. The water tower supplied water for the engines to use to create steam and the depot was used for more demanding maintenance. Workers were required year-round to keep the track in shape. In winter, snow was removed from the tracks and in the summertime, the sleepers were changed and workers ensured that the track was sound enough for trains to run on it.

The livelihood of the State Railways staff was stable, which encouraged an ever increasing number of professionals in other sectors to move to Haapamäki. The village continued to grow despite the fact that it had no industry to speak of and business was not very profitable. One of the major barriers to developing business was the free tickets that railway workers received and that they used to go to town to do business and shop.

A significant step in the development of Haapamäki railway station was the construction of the Haapamäki–Pori line in the beginning of the 1930s. Due to increased traffic, additional tracks were built on the west side of the railway yard. At the same time, the level crossing north of the station was removed and a flyover was built for the road. Thanks to the Pori line, it was possible for trains to head in four different directions from Haapamäki, which was rare in Finland at that point in time. Thus the number of staff grew and more construction was needed. The depot was enlarged and the wood yard expanded. The Finnish State Railway had a four-story brick building built near the station with 24 apartments for railroad workers. At the same time, a large number of single-family houses were built around the station and 40 single-family houses were built in the Kumpulampi section of the village. Thanks to the new line, the station rose in the ranks, which also affected the increases in the wages that staff received.

Soon after the Pori line was built, plans were laid to build a line between Haapamäki and Saarijärvi. The Finnish Defence Forces and Members of Parliament from Central Finland stood behind the project because they felt that it was important and it would shorten the trip south of the Haapamäki-Jyväskylä line by 100 km, which would also make it possible to reach Tampere via Haapamäki without having to go through Jyväskylä first. The project was pushed by MP Taavi Vilhula and the proposal was quickly passed in Parliament. The line was marked out in the terrain at the end of the 1930s with one of the most important stations along the way being Multia, which was where MP Vilhula was from. The eruption of World War II, however, caused construction on the line to stop and the severe war reparations that Finland had to pay put a damper on further construction for a long time even once the war was over. The decision to build the line was finally shelved when plans to build a direct line between Jyväskylä and Jämsä were launched.

== Buildings ==
The first station building was built at the beginning of the 1880s and it started to be used for that purpose in 1882 when trains started running between Tampere and Vaasa. The building was located on the west end of the railway yard. When Haapamäki became a junction station after the christening of the line to Jyväskylä, a new station building was built on the east end of the yard. The old station was turned into a house for the stationmaster. An expansive park was next to it; this park was called Gröndahl's Park after the stationmaster at the time. When the railway yard was expanded to accommodate the line to Pori in 1937, the park was razed and the old station building dismantled. It is said that Gröndahl sent 2,000 plant species and varieties to the Botanic Garden of the University of Helsinki.

Haapamäki's new station building was completed in 1897. It was designed by Bruno Granholm and represents the Romantic Nationalist style. Separate waiting rooms were built for second and third class passengers. A restaurant occupied one end of the building and both passengers and locals dine there. Up until the beginning of the 1900s, passenger trains stopped in Haapamäki for approximately 30 minutes so passengers could refresh themselves in the restaurant.

Due to growing demand, the Finland's State Railways had a separate station restaurant built north of the station building proper in the 1940s. The new two-storey restaurant building had a dining area and a kitchen downstairs and staff rooms upstairs. The 1940s were good for the restaurant, as there were still relatively few cars and as the Karelian evacuees traveled a lot. The restaurant's popularity fell off sharply, however, mainly due to an ever increasing number of people traveling in private cars, which in turn meant that fewer people took the train. Also, schedules were tightened in order to remain competitive with car travel, allowing less time for a relaxed meal. The restaurant saw its business drop even farther once beer could freely be sold in coffee shops. In addition, the restaurant being open at night due to train traffic meant that the great majority of customers were drinking alcohol, which, in turn, made the experience less enjoyable and finally ended up being the reason for the restaurant closing down.

== Stationmasters ==
The following individuals have served as stationmasters at Haapamäki railway station:

- Johan Edvard Bengelsdorf, 1 November 1883 – 1 August 1889
- Karl Alex Richter, 1 September 1889 – 1 May 1897
- Artur Eugen Hammarström, 1 June 1897 – 8 September 1897
- August Vilhelm Söderberg, 1 December 1897 – 22 June 1901
- Isak Arvid Esko, 1 August 1901 – 24 February 1908
- Karl Jakob Cajanus, 1 July 1908 – 1 January 1911
- Edvin Vilhelm Lindberg, 1 September 1913 – 1 July 1915
- Solmu Jokipaltio, 1 October 1915 – 1 October 1925
- Oskar Alvar Gröndahl, 1 March 1926 – 30 January 1934
- Eino Vilhelm von Essen, 1 September 1934 – 24 January 1938
- Aarne Lennart Hartman, 1 May 1938 – 30 September 1950
- Erkki Eero Seppänen, 1 November 1951 – 31 December 1955
- Orvo Ilari Laine, 1 June 1956 – 30 November 1966
- Osmo Jokipaltio, 1 February 1968 – 31 May 1978
- Kallis Anton Krogerus, 1 August 1978 – 31 March 1983
- Matti Päiviö Ahola, 1 January 1985 –

The title for stationmasters at Haapamäki railway station has been head of the traffic area since 1968.
