= Pihlajavesi (Keuruu) =

Lake in Finland

- Location within Finland
- Location: Keuruu
- Coordinates: 62°21.5′N 24°17′E
- Lake type: Natural
- Basin countries: Finland
- Surface area: 20.7 km^{2} (8.0 sq mi)
- Average depth: 5.09 m (16.7 ft)
- Max. depth: 19.97 m (65.5 ft)
- Water volume: 0.105 km^{3} (0.025 cu mi)
- Shore length^{1}: 83.27 km (51.74 mi)
- Surface elevation: 138.6 m (455 ft)
- Frozen: December–April
- Islands: Selkisaari, Iso Korpisaari,
- Settlements: Pihlajavesi
- ^{1} Shore length is not a well-defined measure.

Pihlajavesi is a medium-sized lake in Central Finland. It is situated in the municipality of Keuruu (formerly Pihlajavesi) in the Central Finland region. It drains through a chain of lakes into the Lake Tarjanne and is part of the Kokemäenjoki basin.

== See also ==
- List of lakes in Finland
