= Jyväskylä Central Station =

Railway station in Jyväskylä, Finland

Jyväskylä
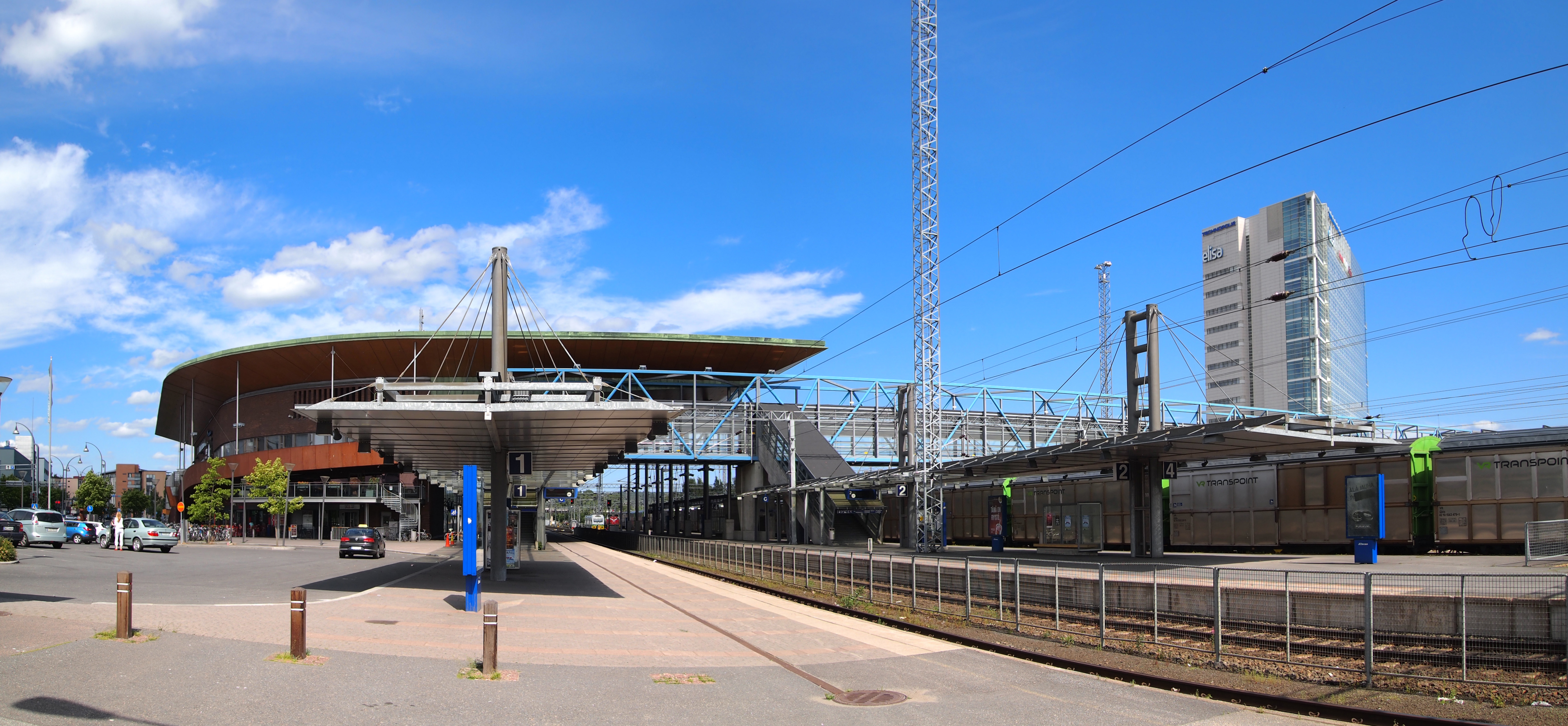

General information
- Location: Hannikaisenkatu 20, 40100 Jyväskylä
- Coordinates: 62°14′27″N 25°45′13″E
- System: VR station
- Owner: Finnish Transport Agency
- Lines: Orivesi–Jyväskylä; Haapamäki–Jyväskylä; Jyväskylä–Pieksämäki
- Platforms: 4
- Tracks: 14

Construction
- Structure type: ground station
- Parking: yes
- Cycle facilities: yes
- Accessible: yes

History
- Opened: 1897
- Rebuilt: 2002
- Electrified: 1980s

Services
Preceding station	VR Group	Following station
Jämsä towards Orivesi	Orivesi–Jyväskylä	Terminus
Petäjävesi towards Haapamäki	Haapamäki–Jyväskylä	Terminus
Terminus	Jyväskylä–Pieksämäki	Hankasalmi towards Pieksämäki
Location

Jyväskylä Central Station, also known as Jyväskylä Travel Center (Finnish: Jyväskylän matkakeskus) is a transportation hub located in the city of Jyväskylä, Finland. The station is the city's main train station as well its main long-distance bus terminal.

== History ==
Passenger traffic started at Jyväskylä on 1 November 1897, when the railway track from Haapamäki was built and Jyväskylä was added to the Finnish railway network. The track to Suolahti was opened in 1898, and later extended to Äänekoski and Haapajärvi. Another line was opened to Pieksämäki in 1918. The current track layout dates from 1977, when a new line was opened between Jämsänkoski and Jyväskylä to ease traffic between Haapajärvi and Jyväskylä. Passenger traffic started on the new line in May 1978.

The station building was constructed between 1896 and 1897 according to the style of the time, by the architect Bruno Granholm at the Finnish Railway Institute. The station building represents national romanticist wooden architecture. The station included the stationmaster's quarters and a storage house. The station expanded with a restaurant designed by Thure Hellström in 1916. In addition, two two-floor residential buildings with accompanying service buildings were built in 1921. The station building was expanded again in 1923 and from 1968 to 1969.

The idea of combining the rail and bus stations was already suggested in the 1980s, and a competition was held in 1995 to select the design for the future station. The winning bid, designed in collaboration by architect companies Harris & Kjisik and Petri Rouhiainen, was named Kannel as it was modeled after the Finnish instrument. Work started in July 2001. The new travel centre was opened on 2 December 2002 near the old station buildings, which were converted into business, service and residential use. The old station is part of the Finnish contract to preserve historically significant station areas, and is part of the inventory of culturally significant areas of the Finnish National Board of Antiquities.

== Services ==
On the first floor, the travel centre offers services for both bus and rail passengers . It also contains restaurants, small shops, a baby-care space and a passenger information system.

== Departure tracks ==
Jyväskylä railway station has four platform tracks. Tracks 3–4 are currently unused by passenger trains.

- Track 1 is used by long-distance trains both towards Helsinki and Pieksämäki.
- Track 2 is used by railbus services to Seinäjoki and Tampere (via Haapamäki).

Views of the station

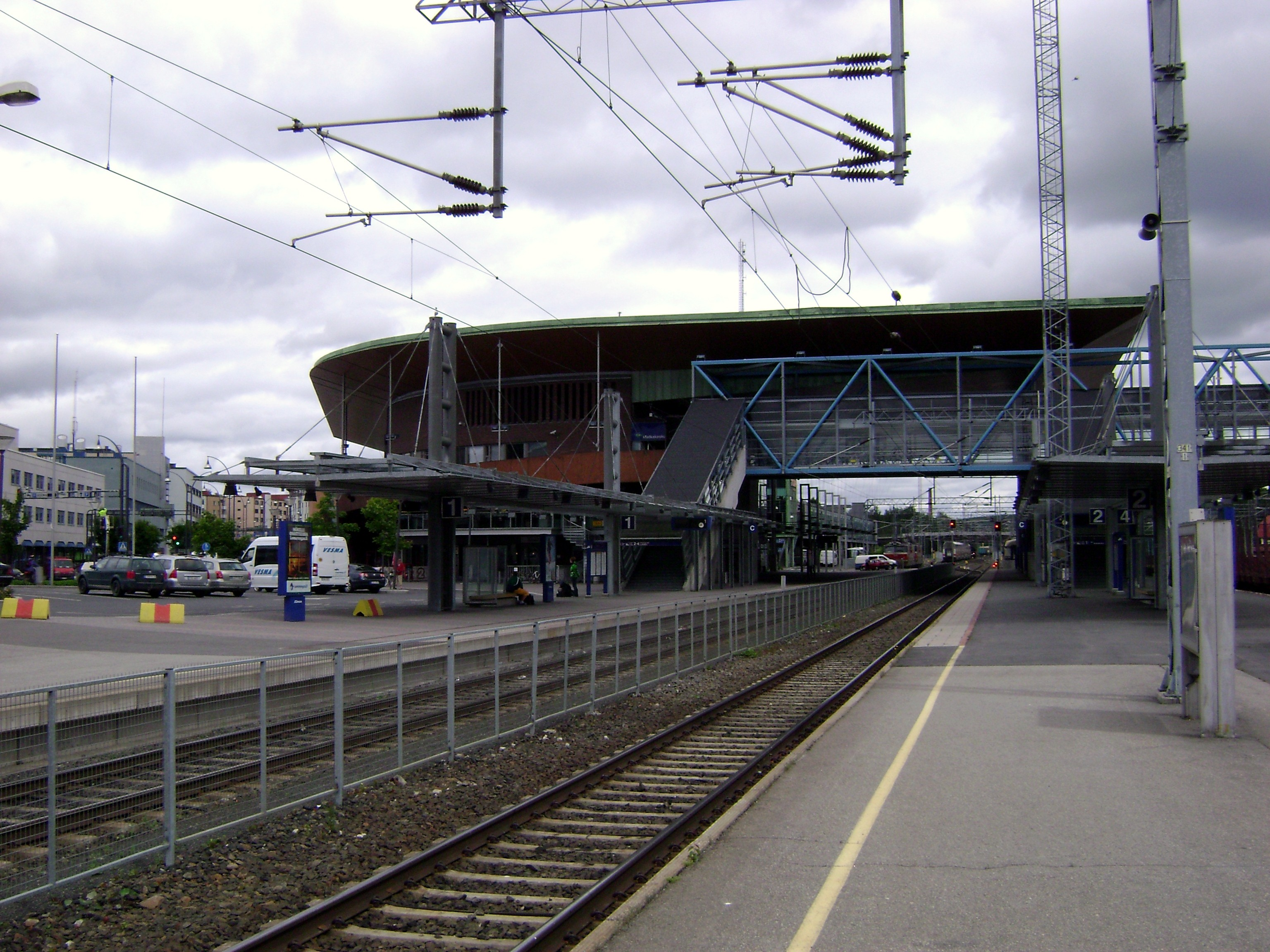
The station from the platforms.

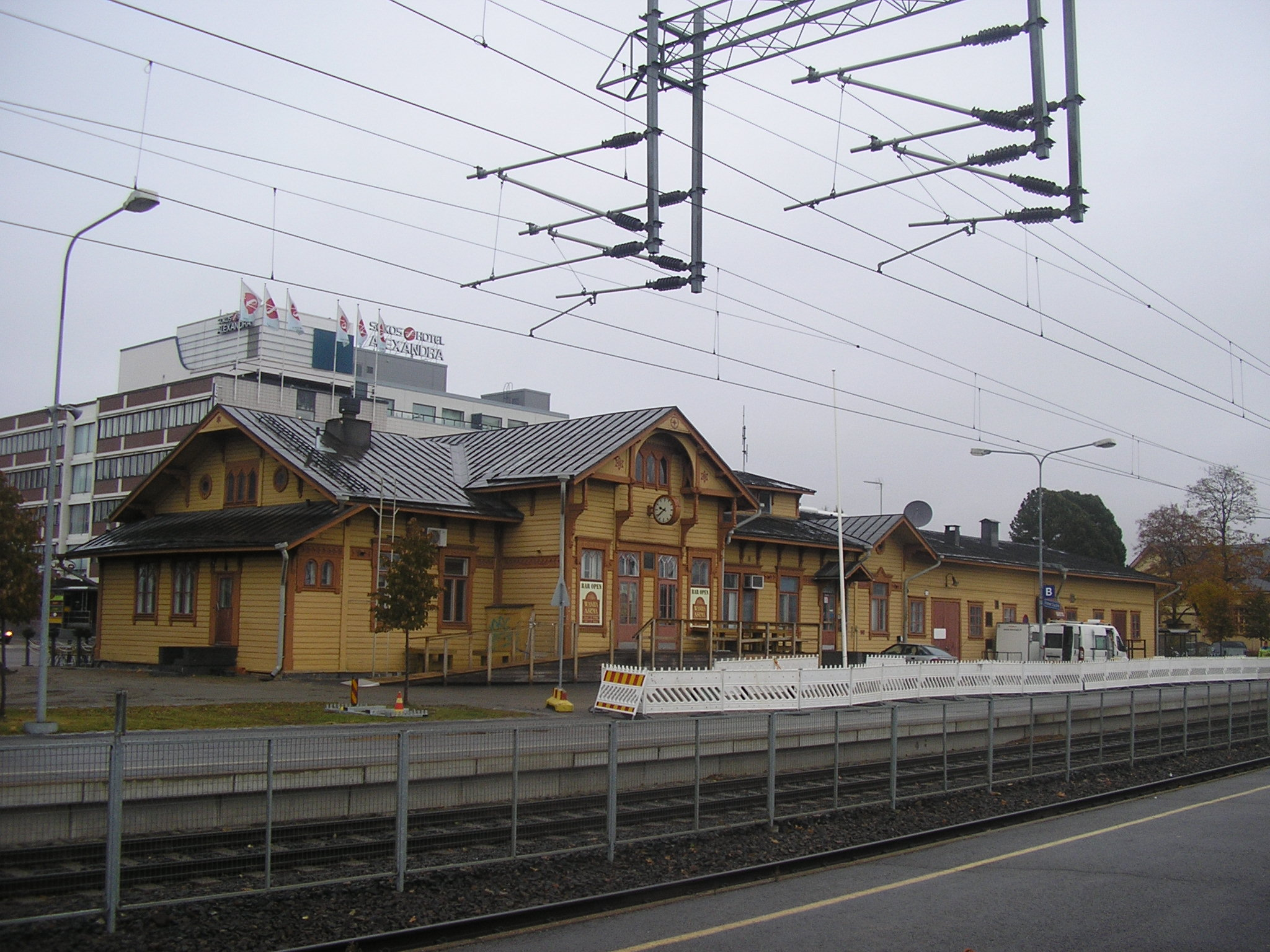
The old station building.

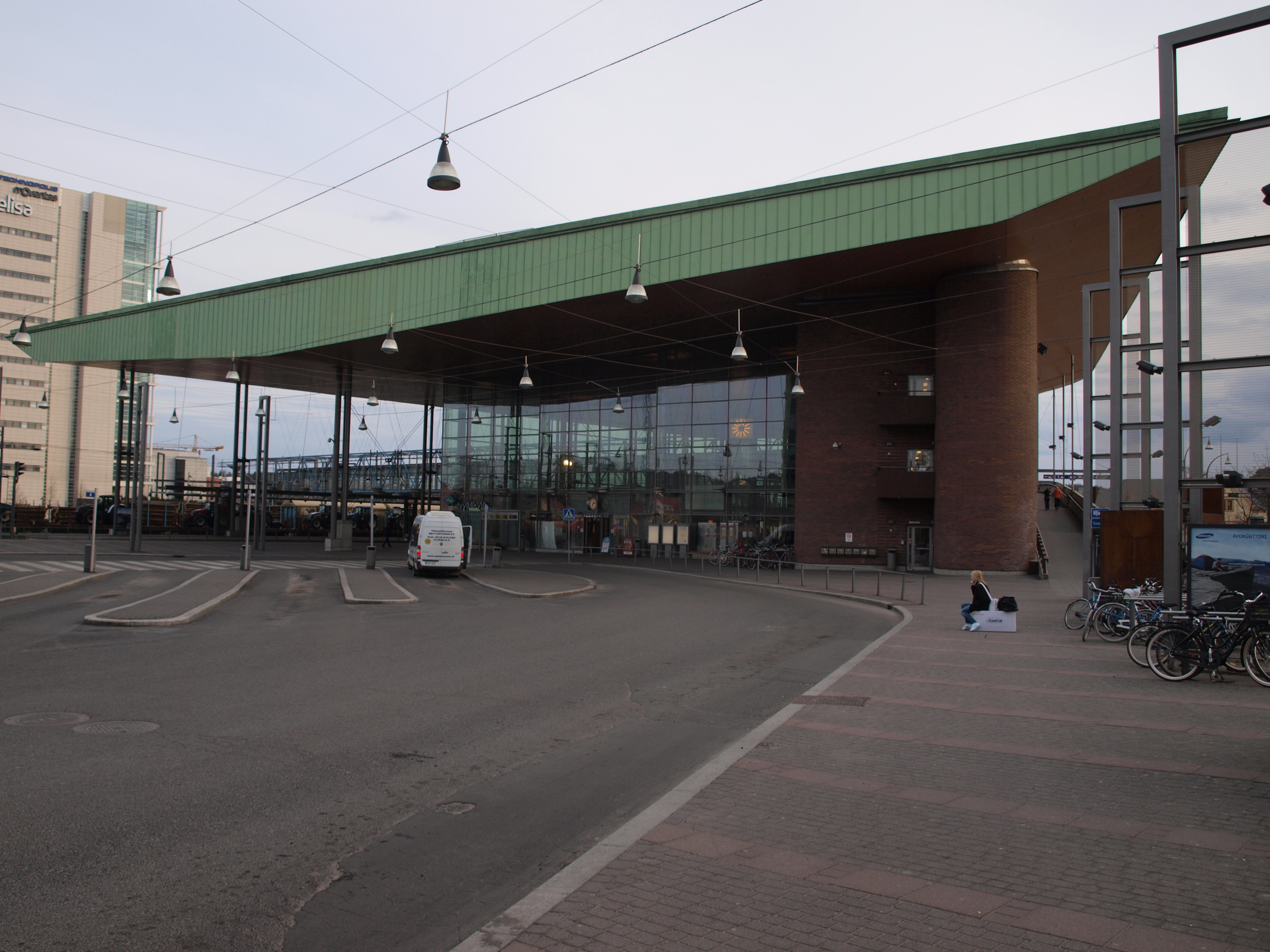
The station from the outside.

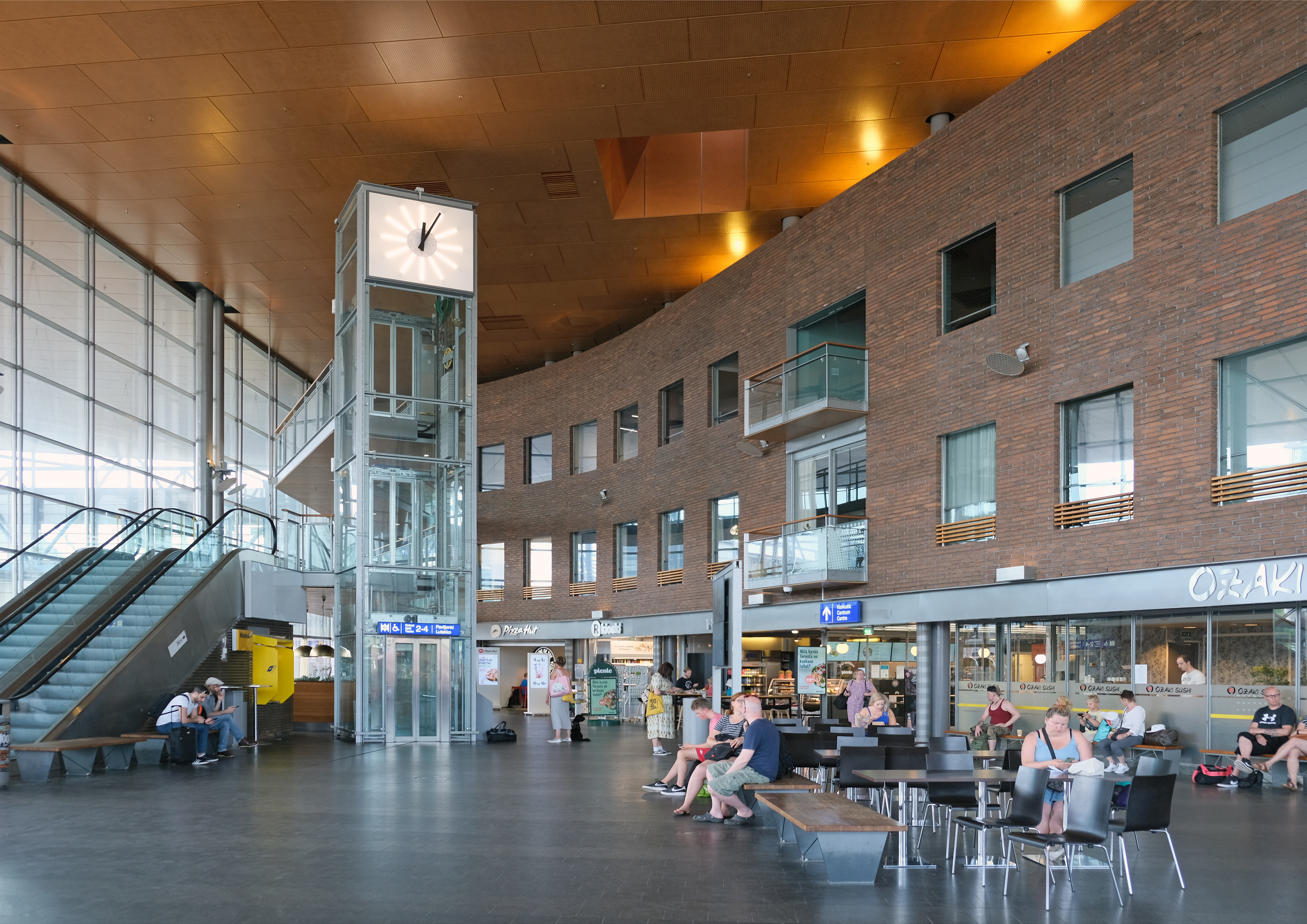
The station from the inside.

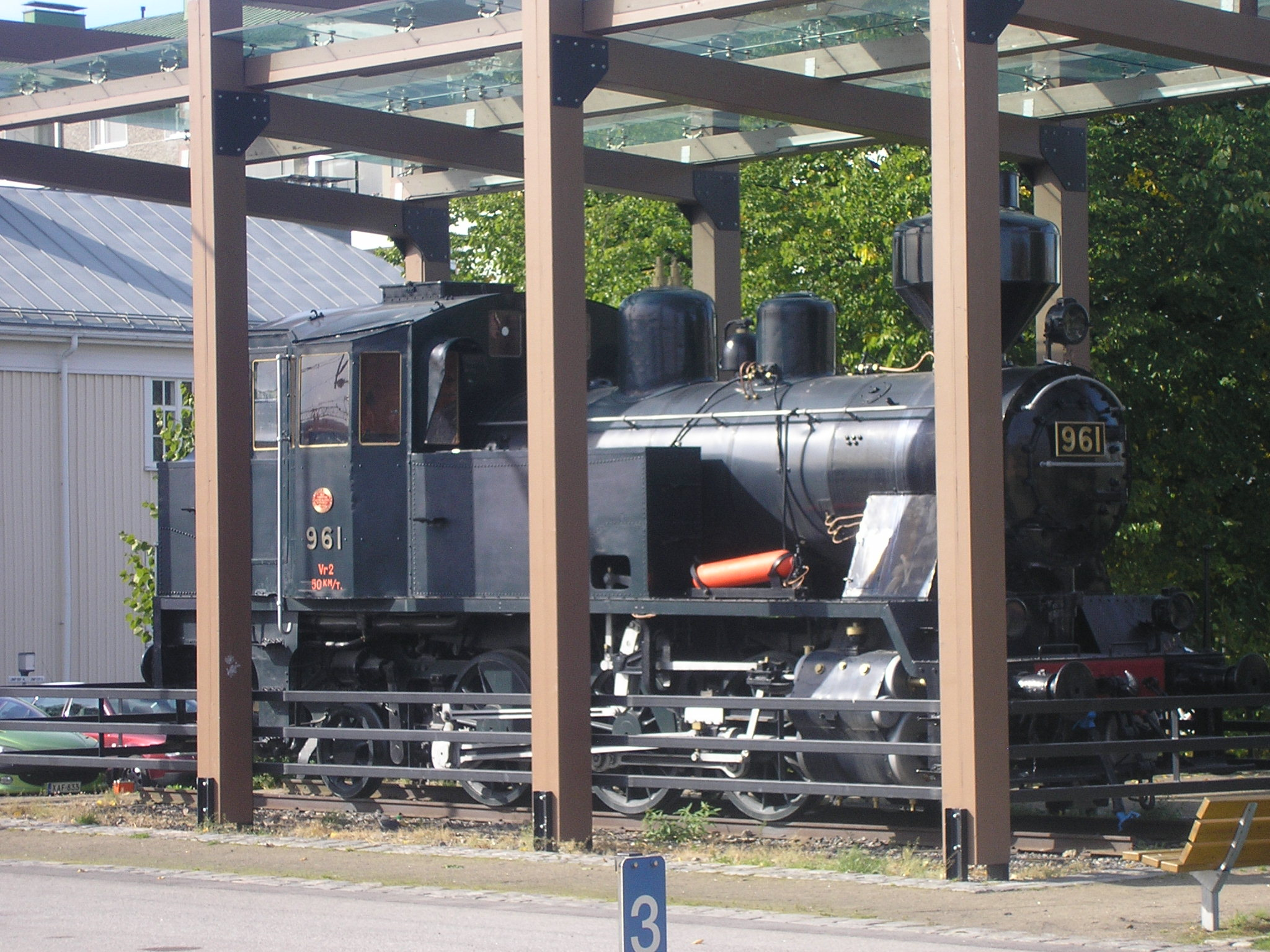
Vr Class Vr2 steam locomotive no. 961 at Jyväskylä railway station in Jyväskylä, Finland

== See also ==
- Jyväskylä rail accident
