= Vaasa railway station =

Railway station in Vaasa, Finland

Vaasa Vasa
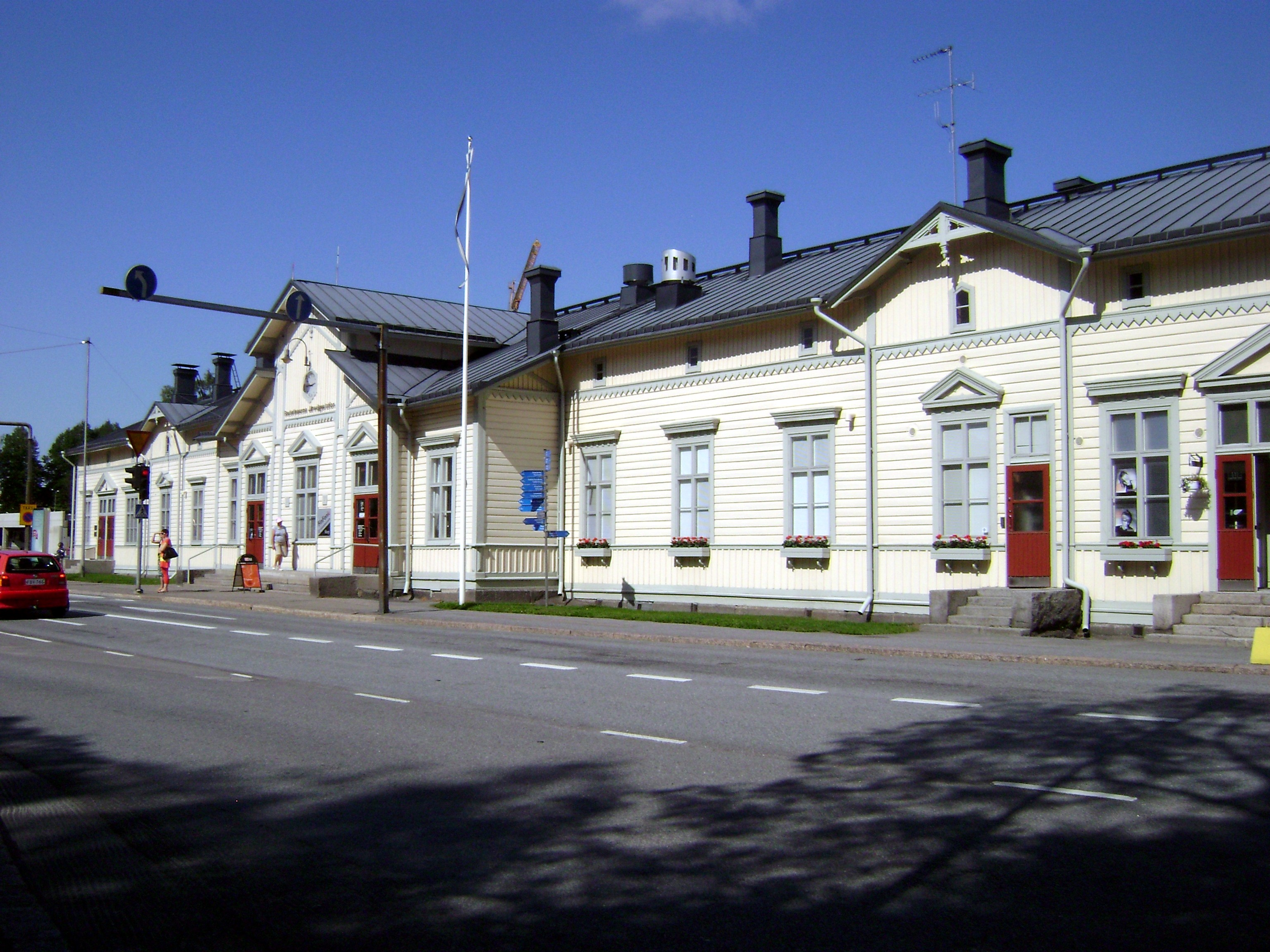

General information
- Location: Ratakatu 13, 65100; Vaasa; Finland
- Coordinates: 63°05′51″N 021°37′18″E
- System: VR station
- Owner: Finnish Transport Infrastructure Agency
- Operator: VR Group
- Line: Seinäjoki-Vaasa
- Platforms: 1 side platform

Construction
- Architect: Knut Nylander

Other information
- Station code: Vs
- Classification: Operating point

History
- Opened: 29 September 1883
- Former names: Nikolainkaupunki/Nikolaistad (until 13 October 1917)

Passengers
- 2008: 353,000

Services
Preceding station	VR Group	Following station
Tervajoki towards Seinäjoki	Seinäjoki–Vaasa	Terminus
Location
- Location within Ostrobothnia Location within Finland

The Vaasa railway station (Finnish: Vaasan rautatieasema, Swedish: Vasa järnvägsstation) is located in the city of Vaasa, Finland. It is located along the Seinäjoki–Vaasa railway; it is one of the termini for passenger trains that use the line, and its neighboring station in the east is Tervajoki.

== Services ==
Vaasa is one of the termini for all passenger trains that use the Seinäjoki–Vaasa line; the routes include Helsinki–Vaasa and Seinäjoki–Vaasa. All trains arriving to and departing from the station use track 1.
