= Seinäjoki railway station =

Railway station in Seinäjoki, Finland

Seinäjoki
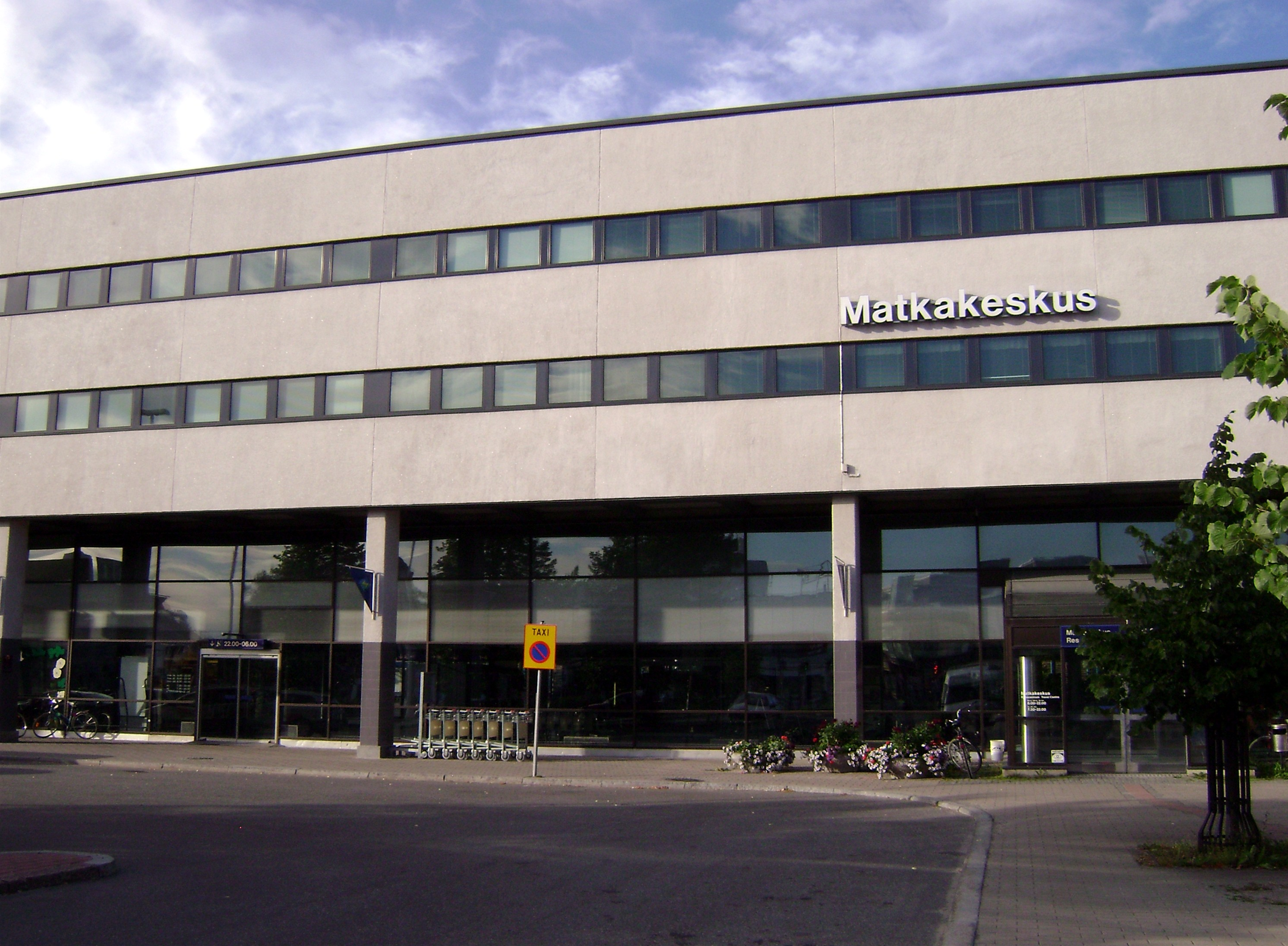

General information
- Location: Valtionkatu 1, 60100 Seinäjoki
- Coordinates: 62°47′31″N 022°50′37″E
- System: VR station
- Owner: Finnish Transport Infrastructure Agency

History
- Opened: 1883

Passengers
- 2009: 654 600

Services
Preceding station	VR Group	Following station
Parkano towards Tampere	Tampere–Seinäjoki	Terminus
Alavus towards Haapamäki	Haapamäki–Seinäjoki	Terminus
Terminus	Seinäjoki–Oulu	Lapua towards Oulu
Terminus	Seinäjoki–Vaasa	Tervajoki towards Vaasa
Parkano towards Helsinki	Helsinki–Kolari (overnight service)	Lapua towards Kolari
Tampere towards Helsinki	Helsinki–Kemijärvi (overnight service)	Kokkola towards Kemijärvi
Location
- Location within South Ostrobothnia Location within Finland

The Seinäjoki railway station (Finnish: Seinäjoen rautatieasema) is located in the centre of city of Seinäjoki, Finland, at Valtionkatu 1. The current station building was built in the 1970s, and it is located in the same building as the bus station. In the 2000s, the building was renovated as a modern travel centre.

Seinäjoki is a significant crossing point, with connections toward Haapamäki, Helsinki, Vaasa and Oulu. The track to Kaskinen only has cargo traffic nowadays.

In front of the station building is a statue representing a railway worker.

The Finnish Heritage Agency has classified Seinäjoki railway station as a nationally significant built cultural environment.

== History ==
Seinäjoki railway station was opened in 1883 on the Vaasa railway line (Tampere–Haapamäki–Seinäjoki–Vaasa) near the Östermyra industrial area. The original station building was built according to the designs of a Class IV type station building, similarly to Alavus and Vilppula stations. The station was originally named Östermyra, which remained the official Swedish name of the station until 1897.

In 1886, Seinäjoki became a junction station, as the railway line to Oulu was opened. At first, Seinäjoki was a "night station", since trains to Oulu spend the night there and there were also two hotels near the station for railway passengers to spend their night in. In 1911, the railway line to Perälä was opened and was expanded to Kaskinen and Kristinestad the following year.

The second station building designed by architect firm Heikki Castrén was built in 1968–1971. Passenger traffic at the Kaskinen railway line ceased in 1968. In 1971, the Tampere–Parkano–Seinäjoki railway line was opened. The ticket sales office at the Seinäjoki station was closed in 2016.

The current station building designed by architect Anssi Lassila and the architect firm OOPEAA was opened on December 4, 2024. The fate of the former station building from 1971 has not yet been decided.

== Services ==
Seinäjoki is served by all trains from Helsinki towards Oulu and to Vaasa as well as by railbus services via Haapamäki to Jyväskylä (some terminate already at Ähtäri).

== Departure tracks ==
Seinäjoki railway station has four platform tracks.

- Track 1 is used by the majority of long-distance train services towards Helsinki, Oulu and Vaasa.
- Track 2 is used by some trains to Helsinki and one service to Vaasa.
- Track 3 is used by a couple of train services to Vaasa.
- Track 4 is the departure track of the railbus services to Ähtäri and Jyväskylä.
