= Viiala railway station =

Railway station in Akaa, Finland

Viiala
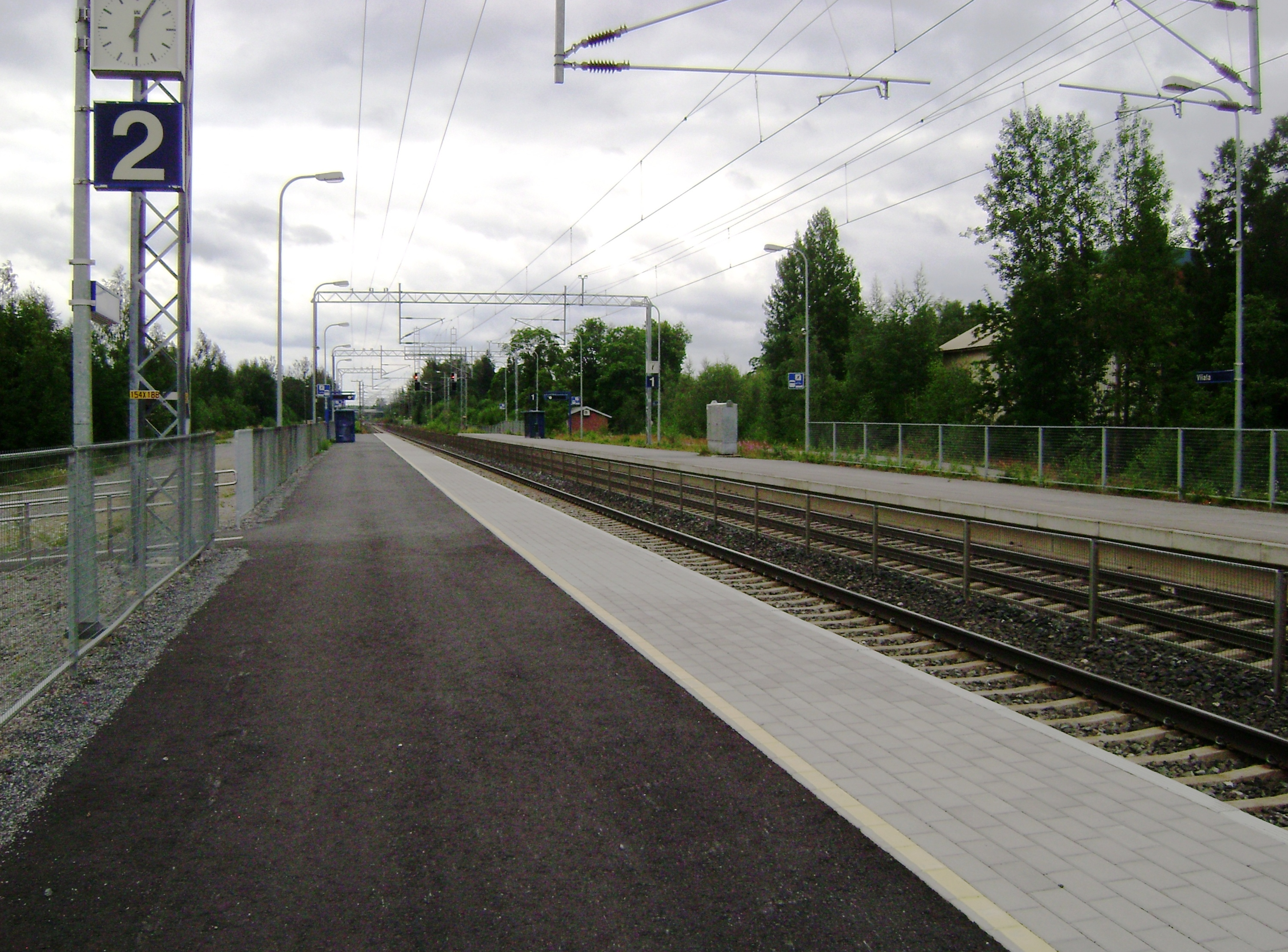

General information
- Location: Rautatienkatu, 37830; Viiala, Akaa; Finland
- Coordinates: 61°12′45″N 023°46′12″E
- System: VR station
- Owner: Finnish Transport Infrastructure Agency
- Operator: VR Group
- Line: Riihimäki–Tampere railway
- Platforms: 2 side platforms
- Tracks: 2

Other information
- Station code: Via
- Classification: Halt

History
- Opened: 22 June 1876; 150 years ago

Passengers
- 2008: 39,000

Services
Preceding station	VR commuter rail	Following station
Toijala Terminus	M	Lempäälä towards Nokia
Toijala towards Helsinki	R	Lempäälä towards Tampere
Location
- Location within Pirkanmaa Location within Finland

The Viiala railway station (Finnish: Viialan rautatieasema, Swedish: Viiala järnvägsstation) is located in the town of Akaa (formerly the municipality of Viiala), Finland, in the urban area and district of Viiala. It is located along the Riihimäki–Tampere railway, and its neighboring stations are Lempäälä in the north and Toijala in the south.

== History ==
Viiala railway station was opened on June 22, 1876, as the expansion of the Helsinki–Hämeenlinna line to Tampere, as well as the railway line from Turku to Toijala, were opened. Viiala was considered to be made into a junction station for these two railway lines, but eventually the nearby Toijala station was made the junction station.

The station building was completed in 1876 and was expanded in 1908 with the plans of architect Bruno Granholm. After the station was opened, Viiala soon turned into a significant industrial community with the saw established already in 1873, a glass factory in 1890 and a file factory in 1901. As the glass factory was closed in the 1930's, a plywood factory was established in its facilities in 1932. Viiala became a municipality in 1932.

The ticket sales office at the Viiala station closed down in 1998 and in the same year the train platforms were moved northwards. The station building was demolished the next year during the renewing of the station. Freight traffic at the station ceased in 2004.

== Services and departure tracks ==
Viiala is served by VR commuter rail line R on the route Helsinki–Riihimäki–Tampere, as well as line M on the route Toijala–Tampere–Nokia. Southbound trains toward Toijala, Riihimäki and Helsinki use track 1, while northbound trains toward Tampere and Nokia use track 2.
