= Lempäälä railway station =

Railway station in Lempäälä, Finland

Lempäälä
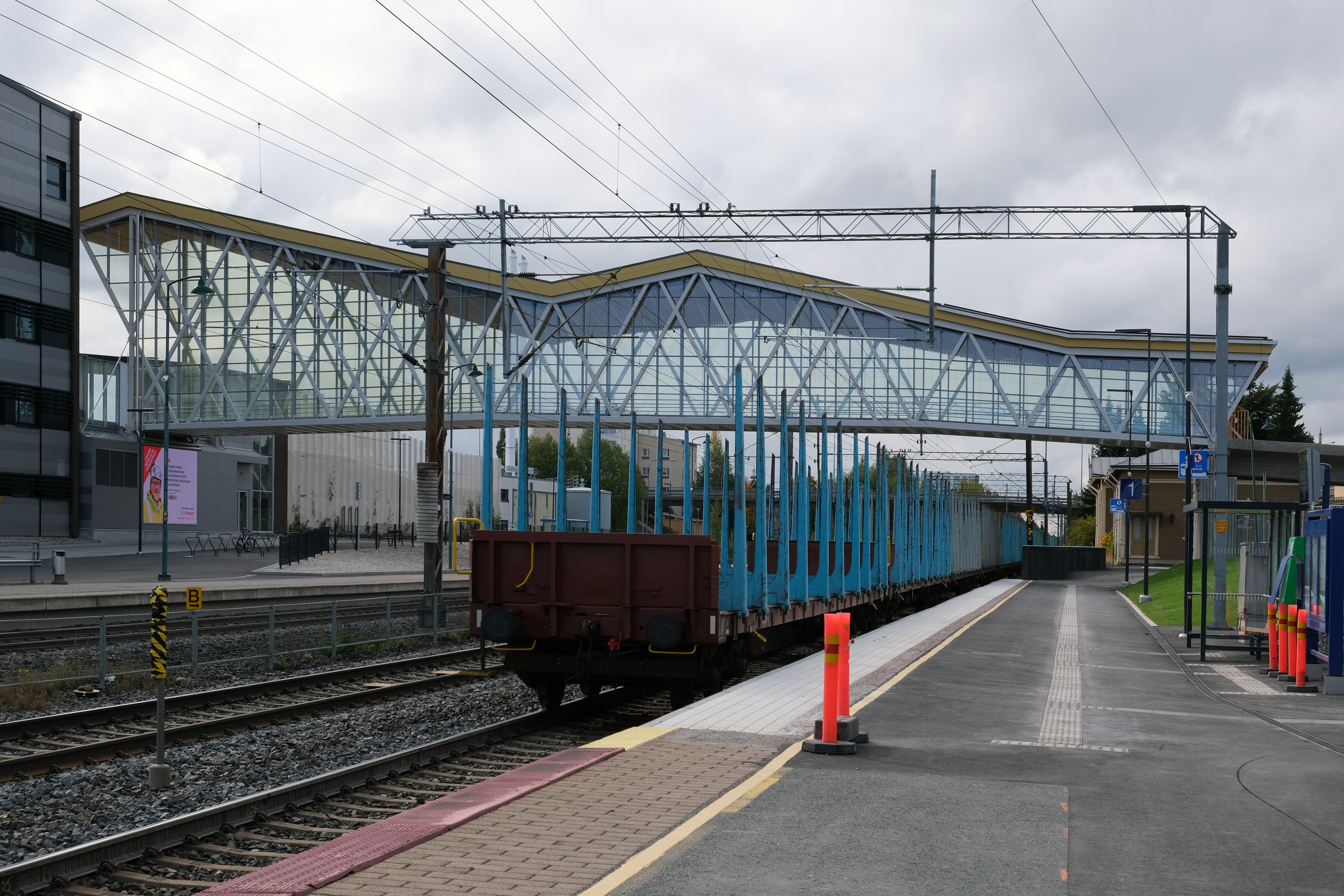

General information
- Location: Asematie 1, 37500; Lempäälä; Finland
- Coordinates: 61°18′48″N 023°45′15″E
- System: VR station
- Owner: Finnish Transport Infrastructure Agency
- Operator: VR Group
- Line: Riihimäki–Tampere railway
- Platforms: 2 side platforms
- Tracks: 2 with platforms 3 in total

Construction
- Structure type: At-grade

Other information
- Station code: Lpä
- Fare zone: C
- Classification: Operating point

History
- Opened: 22 June 1876; 150 years ago
- Former names: Lempoinen/Lembois (until May 1897)

Passengers
- 2008: 62,000

Services
Preceding station	VR commuter rail	Following station
Viiala towards Toijala	M	Tampere towards Nokia
Viiala towards Helsinki	R	Tampere Terminus
Location
- Location within Pirkanmaa Location within Finland

The Lempäälä railway station (Finnish: Lempäälän rautatieasema, Swedish: Lempäälä järnvägsstation) is located in the central urban area of the municipality of Lempäälä. It is located along the Riihimäki–Tampere railway, and its neighboring stations are Tampere in the north and Viiala in the south.

The Finnish Heritage Agency has classified Lempäälä railway station as a nationally significant built cultural environment.

== History ==
Lempäälä railway station was opened on June 22, 1876, originally named Lempoinen, as the expansion of the Helsinki–Hämeenlinna line to Tampere along with the Turku–Toijala railway line were opened. The original station building was completed the same year and was expanded in 1908 and 1922 with the designs of architect Bruno Granholm.

Lempäälä was a significant transport hub before the railway was opened, with the canal built there in 1867–1874 through which the watercourse from Hämeenlinna to Tampere ran.

The newer station building was completed in 1980 and also had a police station. The ticket sales office was closed in 1998. Freight traffic at the station ceased in 1993.

== Services and departure tracks ==
Lempäälä is served by VR commuter rail line R on the route Helsinki–Riihimäki–Tampere, as well as line M on the route Toijala–Tampere–Nokia. In addition, some of the long-distance train services running between Helsinki and Tampere make a stop at the station. Southbound trains toward Toijala, Riihimäki and Helsinki use track 1, while northbound trains toward Tampere and Nokia use track 3. Track 2 lacks a platform and is only used by trains passing through the station.
