= Transport in Tampere =

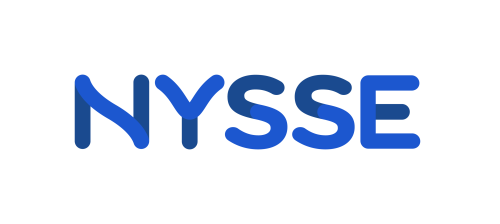
Logo of the Tampere-Pirkanmaa Regional Transport Authority

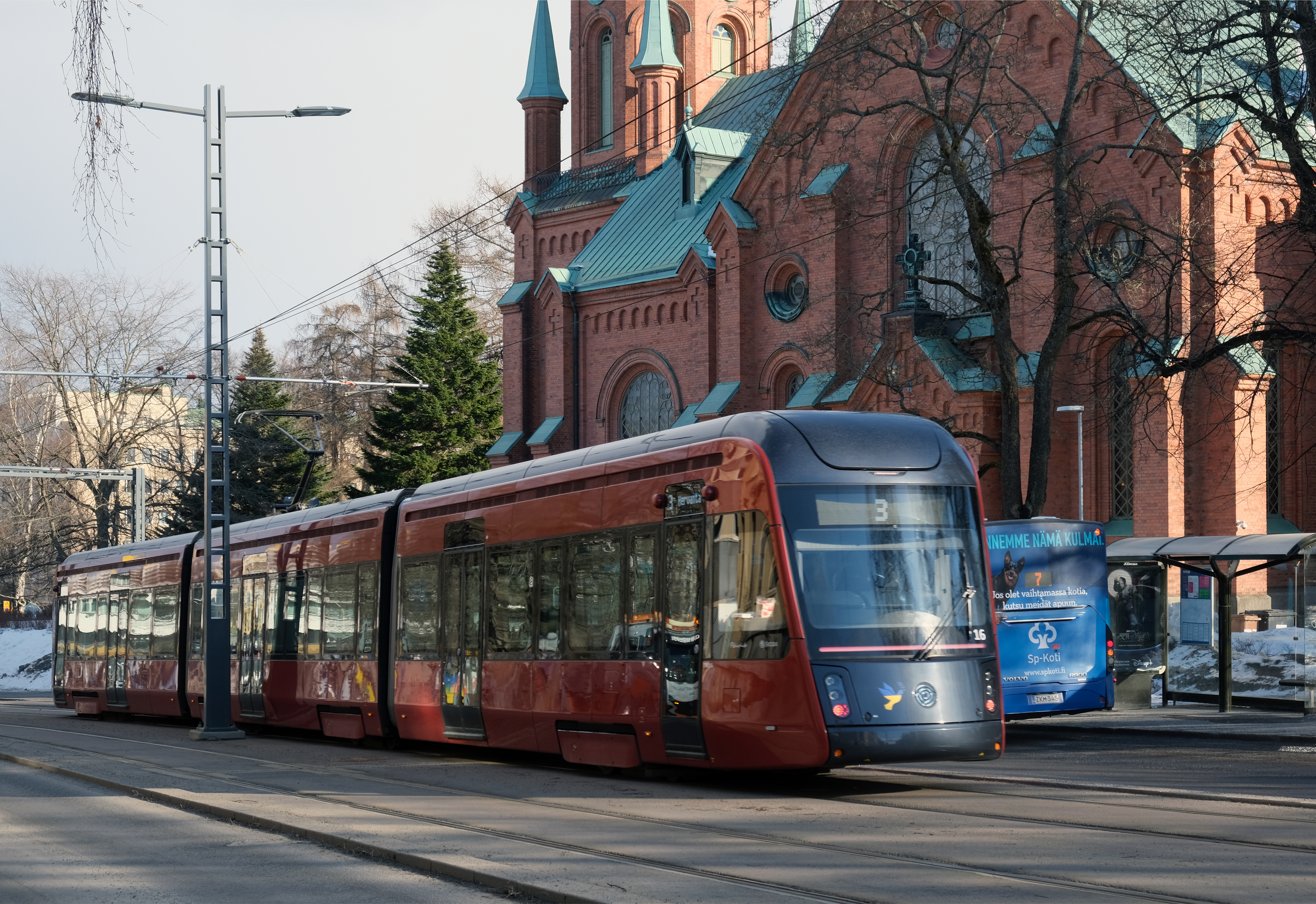
Tampere light rail train next to Aleksanterin kirkko

Transport in Tampere consists of car, bus, light rail and commuter rail services linking the city centre of Tampere, Finland, to surrounding residential areas and towns in the Pirkanmaa region. The system is managed by the Tampere Regional Transport Authority (Finnish: Tampereen seudun joukkoliikenne), branded as Nysse. The name originates from a local colloquialism nysse tulee (from nyt se tulee, "now it's coming"), with nysse jokingly used to refer to any public transport vehicle.

Fare zones are in use between areas, assigned letters A–C (Changed from A-F in January 2024), each depending on distance from the downtown of Tampere.

== Roads ==
Due to its central location, Tampere is easy to approach from all over Finland. Tampere is currently served by the Finnish highways 3, 9, 11, and 12 and the main road 65. Highway 3 connects Tampere with the cities of Helsinki and Hämeenlinna in the south and Vaasa in the north-west. Highway 9 connects it with Jyväskylä and Kuopio in the east and Turku in the south-west. Road 11 is connected to the city of Pori on the western coast. Highway 12 connects Tampere with Rauma in the south-west and Lahti and Kouvola in the south-east. Main road 65 is connected with the town of Virrat in the northern part of the Pirkanmaa region.

== Commuter rail ==
The Tampere commuter rail network currently consists of services from Tampere Central Station to Toijala via Lempäälä and Viiala to the south, and to Nokia via Tesoma to the north. Services operate as the M train, services continuing towards Helsinki also run as the R train.

The current commuter rail services are operated by VR Group under public service obligation agreement that expires at the end of 2030. The Government of Finland has decided it is going to continue funding the current services, with any service expansions to be funded by cities along the route. In September 2026, the City of Tampere approved a letter of intent with Traficom about funding additional services, including introducing weekend service on the segment between Tampere and Nokia. In August 2026, the Finnish Transport Infrastructure Agency started planning for a second track to Nokia, with the project also including the construction of additional commuter rail stations at Epilä and Harjuniitty. Planning for an additional station at Sääksjärvi between the current Lempäälä and Tampere stations is also underway.

In addition to the current route, proposals for an additional commuter rail route between Ylöjärvi and Orivesi (with Messukylä and Ruutana as possible new stations) exist.

== Light rail ==
Tampere opened its light rail network on 9 August 2021, which currently consists of 33 stops over 24 kilometres (15 mi) of track after the latest extension to Lentävänniemi opened in January 2025. Extensions to Pirkkala and Linnainmaa are under construction and are expected to open in stages between 2028 and 2032.

== Buses ==
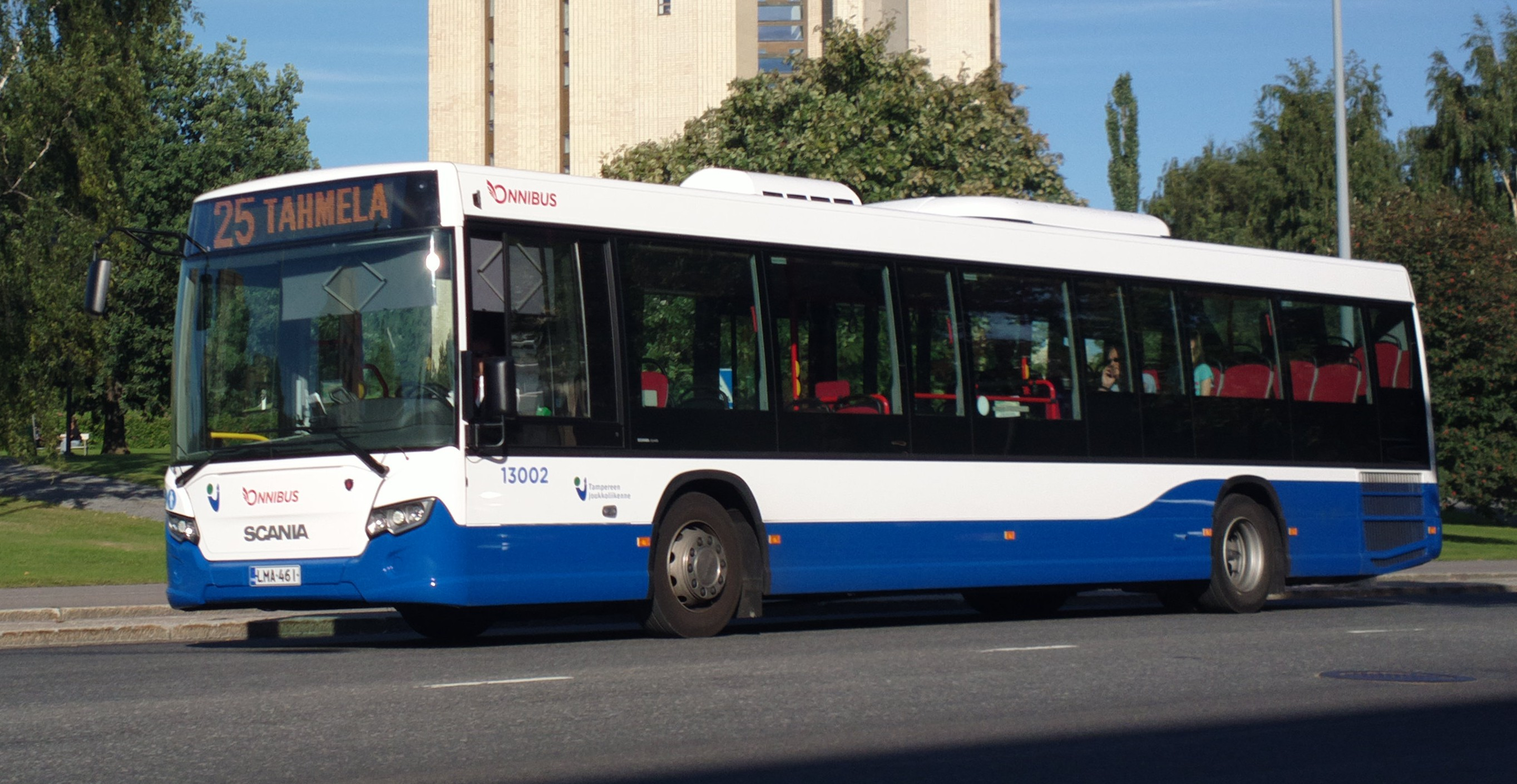
Nysse bus in Tampere

The backbone of public transport in Tampere remains the bus network. The busiest and most important bus lines are branded trunk lines (runkolinjat), some of which may operate with 7.5 minute intervals at peak times.

Many bus routes have been modified to connect to the light rail network instead of running directly to the city center as the light rail network has expanded.

== See also ==
- Public transport
  - Public transport in Helsinki
- Urban sprawl
