= Helsinki–Riihimäki railway =

Railway line in Finland

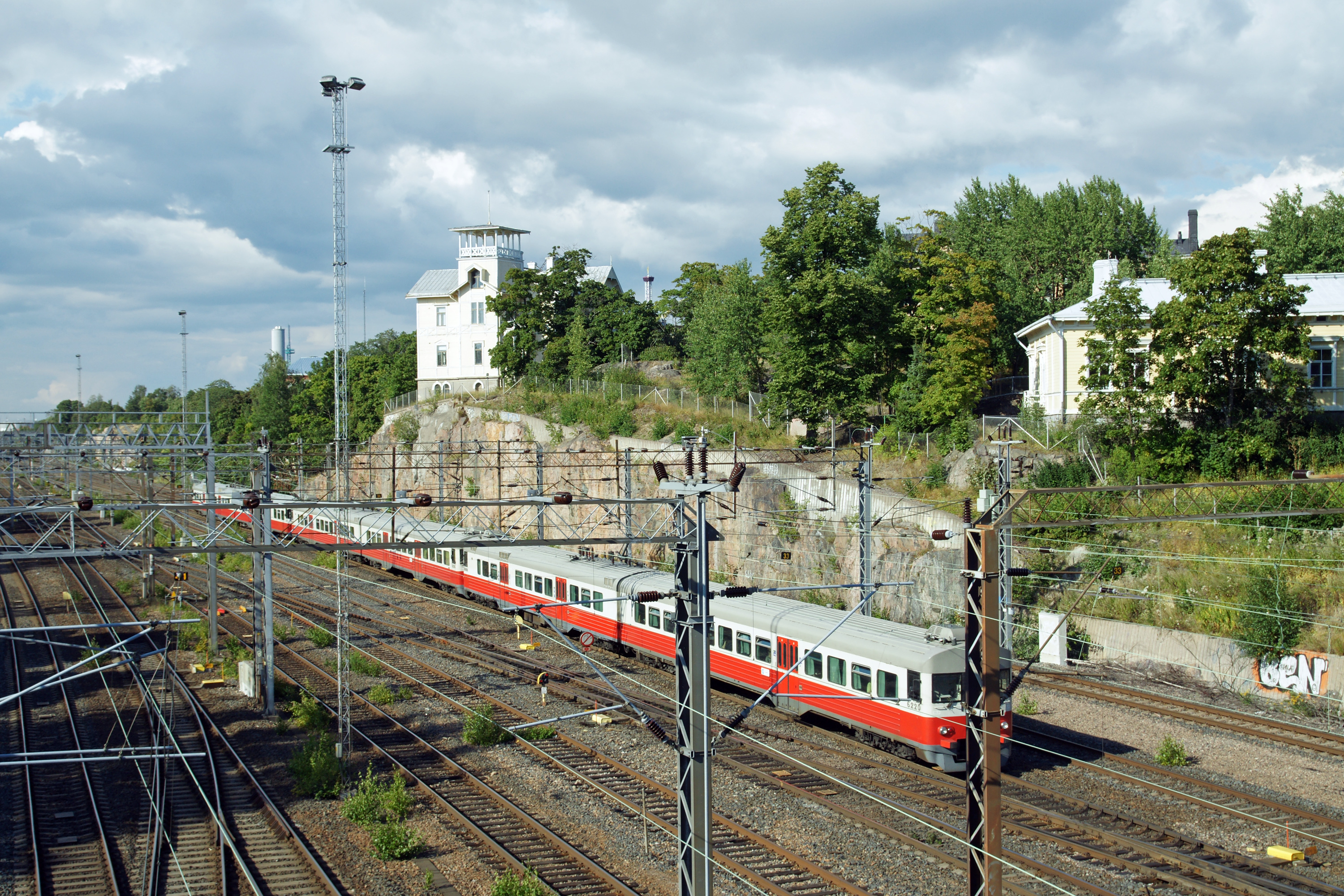

Overview
- Termini: Helsinki; Riihimäki
- Stations: 22

History
- Opened: 1862; 164 years ago

Technical
- Line length: 71.4 km (44.37 mi)
- Number of tracks: Quadruple (Helsinki–Kerava); Double (Kerava–Riihimäki)
- Track gauge: 1,524 mm (5 ft)
- Electrification: 25 kV @ 50 Hz
- Operating speed: Helsinki–Pasila 80 km/h (50 mph); Pasila–Tikkurila 160 km/h (99 mph); Tikkurila–Riihimäki 200 km/h (120 mph)

Helsinki–Riihimäki railway is a railway running between the Helsinki Central railway station and the Riihimäki railway station in Finland, and it is part of the Finnish Main Line. It was opened in 1862 as a part of the Finland's first railway between Helsinki and Hämeenlinna. The Helsinki commuter rail system also runs by the Helsinki–Riihimäki railway.

== Services ==
=== Commuter trains ===
The Helsinki commuter rail lines K and T operate exclusively on the section Helsinki–Riihimäki section, with the former not extending further than Kerava. The core parts of lines R and D lie on the entire extent of the section, though some of these services continue onto the Riihimäki–Tampere railway as well. Line Z branches off towards Lahti after making stops at Tikkurila and Kerava. Lines I and P use the section Helsinki–Hiekkaharju, after which they transition onto the Ring Rail Line.

=== Long-distance trains ===
The Helsinki–Riihimäki section is a core part of long-distance transport in Finland. After departing from Helsinki, trains make stops in Pasila and Tikkurila and proceed towards Kerava, from where they will either transfer onto the eastbound Kerava-Lahti railway line or proceed north towards Riihimäki and the regions of Pirkanmaa and Ostrobothnia via the Riihimäki–Tampere railway.

The termini of the routes that pass through the Helsinki–Riihimäki railway include Tampere, Seinäjoki, Vaasa, Ylivieska, Oulu, Rovaniemi, Kemijärvi, Kouvola, Imatra, Joensuu, Kuopio and Kajaani.
