= Tesoma railway station =

Railway station in Tampere, Finland

Coordinates: 61°30′22″N 23°37′02″E

Tesoma
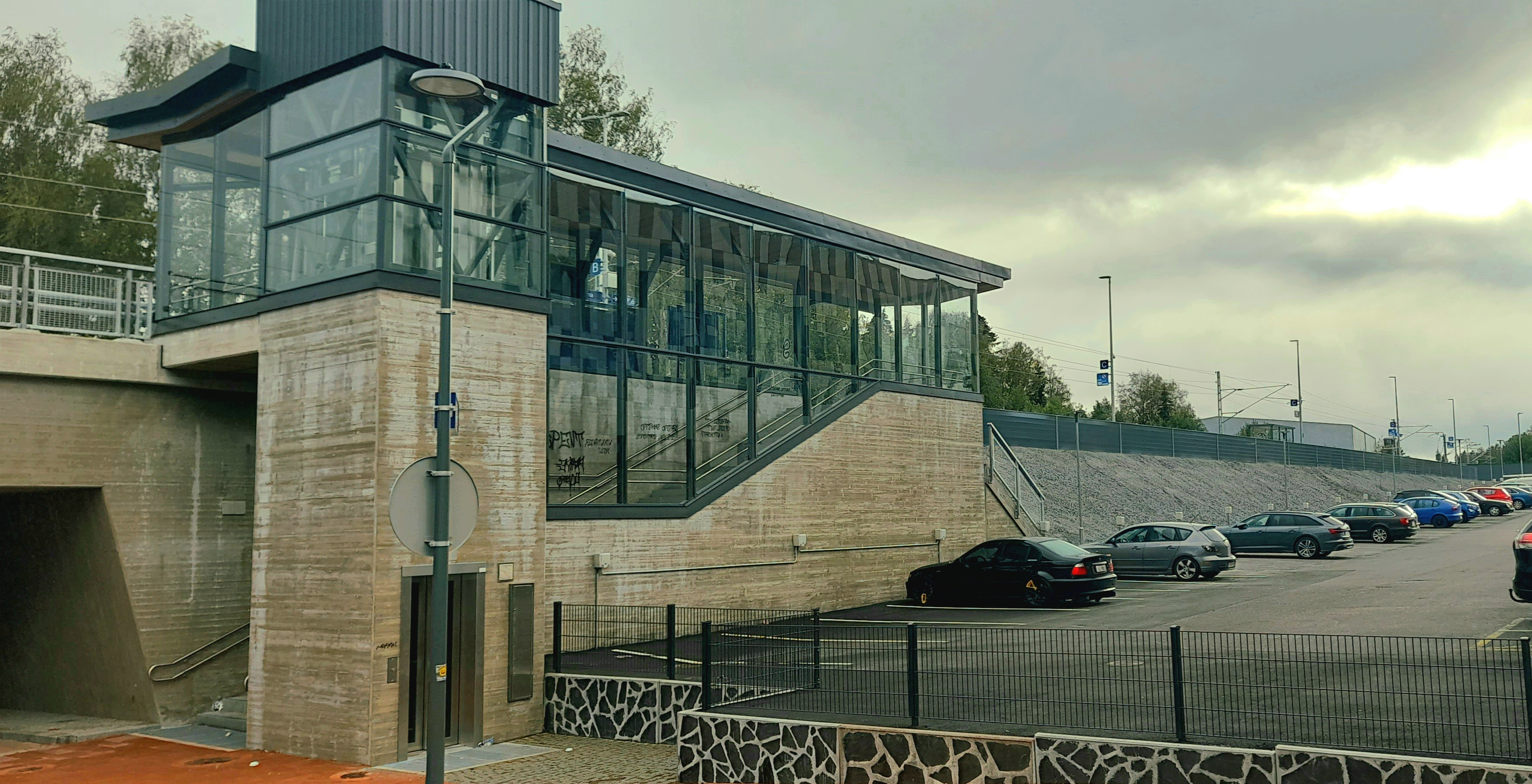
- The station in August 2021.

General information
- Location: Pirkanmaa; Finland
- System: VR commuter rail station
- Operator: VR Group
- Transit authority: Nysse
- Line: Tampere-Pori railway
- Distance: 196.230km
- Platforms: 1
- Tracks: 1
- Train operators: VR

Construction
- Structure type: ground station
- Platform levels: 1

Other information
- Status: Open
- Station code: Tso
- Fare zone: B

Services
Preceding station	VR commuter rail	Following station
Tampere towards Toijala	M	Nokia Terminus
Tampere towards Riihimäki	R	Nokia Terminus
Location

Tesoma railway station (abbreviated Tso) is a railway station in the Tesoma district in Tampere, Finland. The station opened on August 16 2021, with one track at first. The station is located on the Tampere–Pori railway between the track kilometres 196+080 and 196+370. It serves the Tampere commuter rail line M and long-distance traffic between Tampere and Pori. The trip from Tesoma to the Tampere railway station takes about 9 minutes. The location of the station is to the south of the Tesomajärvi shopping centre on the border of the districts of Ristimäki and Rahola.

== History ==
There used to be a train connection to Tesoma, the "flat cap" trains stopped at the Rahola railway station near the level crossing. After bus transport improved the trains ceased to stop at the station, and the level crossing was replaced by an underpass from Vanamonkatu in Ristimäki to Rahola. The train connection is coming back in the form of a commuter train. In early 2019 a group of track directions were chosen to the local pilot train project in Pirkanmaa. Among these was the connection Tampere - Tesoma - Nokia. Local traffic between Toijala and Nokia was started in December 2019, and traffic to Tesoma started in August 2021. The trial period will last until 2022.
