= Aimala =

- Village
- Location within Finland
- Coordinates: 61.33°N 23.69°E
- Country: Finland
- Region: Pirkanmaa
- Municipality: Lempäälä
- Time zone: UTC+01:00 (CET)
  - Summer (DST): UTC+02:00 (CEST)

Aimala is a village located in the Lempäälä municipality of Finland. It is located around 3.5 km (2.2 miles) from the border of the Lempäälä town, and 25 km (16 miles) south from the city of Tampere. The Aimalantie road runs through the village's backbone. The Lamminjärvi lake is located north from the local veterinary. To the west are streams from the Hiivalahti lake near Lumiala. The village of Nurmi is located at the other side of the stream, whereas Lahdenkylä is located east from the forest. Aimala also has the main office of Mikkola Markku, a local bus charter and taxi service.
