= Puntala-rock =

Punk rock festival in Finland

- Genre: Punk, punk rock, crust punk, hardcore punk, thrash metal, post-punk
- Dates: Two days, last weekend in July with a 1-day warm-up in Tampere
- Locations: Lempäälä, Finland
- Coordinates: 61°20′50.2″N 23°37′29.5″E
- Years active: 1982–1991, 2000–present
- Website: www.puntala-rock.net

Puntala-rock is a punk rock festival in Lempäälä, Finland. It is one of the oldest and largest punk rock festivals in Finland. It is an important punk-cultural happening from a Finnish point of view, because similar punk-rock festivals are not held in Finland. The main organizer is the Lempäälän Karuselli ry (LeKa).

Puntala-rock's history begins in 1980. In the 1990s, it was quiet, but in 2000, the event returned. The festival takes place in the last weekend of July. The festival is held on Puntala camp area, located approximately 15 km from the center of Lempäälä towards Pirkkala.

Puntala-rock has no age limit.
