= Nurmi =

Nurmi is a Finnish surname. Notable people with the surname include:

- Anne Nurmi (born 1968), Finnish singer, composer and keyboard player, a member of the band Lacrimosa
- Dovima Nurmi, Spanish drag queen
- Juha Nurmi (born 1959), Finnish retired ice hockey player
- Luka Nurmi (born 2004), Finnish racing driver
- Maila Nurmi (1922–2008), Finnish-American actress who created the 1950s character Vampira
- Markus Nurmi (born 1998), Finnish ice hockey player
- Mauno Nurmi (1936–2018), retired football and ice hockey player
- Noah Nurmi (born 2001), Finnish footballer
- Osku Nurmi, Finnish radio personality
- Paavo Nurmi (1897–1973), Finnish runner, nine-time Olympic champion
- Teemu Nurmi (born 1985), Finnish ice hockey player

Media related to Nurmi (surname) at Wikimedia Commons
