= Osku Nurmi =

Finnish radio personality

Osku Nurmi is a Finnish radio personality. He has been hosting radio programs since the early 1990s, for example in the local radio stations of Salo and Turku, before moving to Nelonen Media's Radio Rock.

He has also worked as host in the Salo qualification for Miss Finland.
