= Riihimäki–Tampere railway =

Railway line in Finland

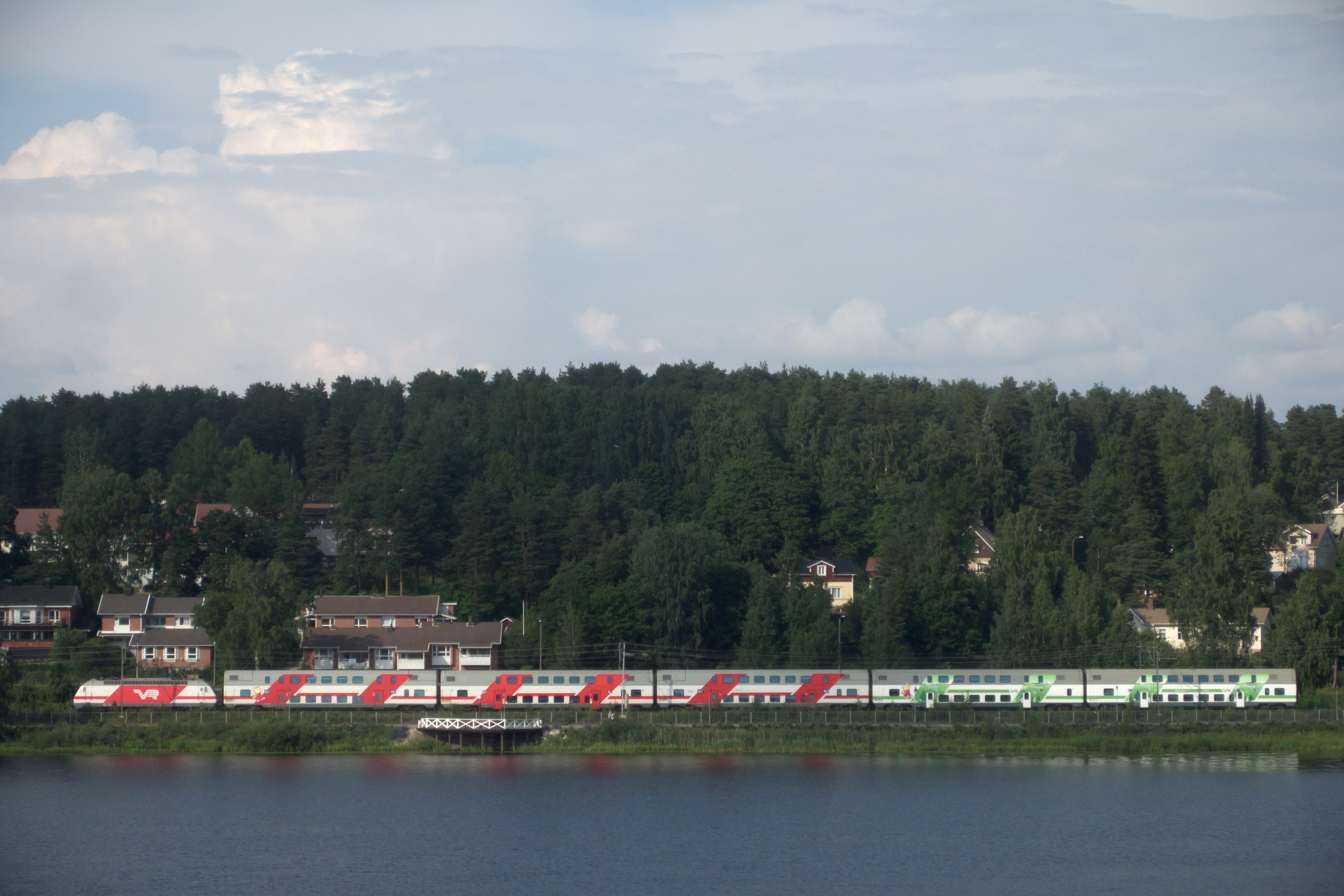

Overview
- Termini: Riihimäki; Tampere
- Stations: 10

History
- Opened: 1862 (Riihimäki–Hämeenlinna); 1876 (Hämeenlinna–Tampere)

Technical
- Line length: 116 km (72.08 mi)
- Number of tracks: Double
- Track gauge: 1,524 mm (5 ft)
- Electrification: 25 kV @ 50 Hz
- Operating speed: 200 km/h (120 mph)

Riihimäki–Tampere railway is a railway running between the Riihimäki railway station and the Tampere railway station in Finland, and it is part of the Finnish Main Line. The line between Riihimäki and Hämeenlinna was opened in 1862 as a part of the Finland's first railway between Helsinki and Hämeenlinna, and the line between Riihimäki and Tampere in 1876.

== Services ==
=== Commuter trains ===
Certain services of the VR commuter rail lines R and D operate in part on the Riihimäki–Tampere section. Line M starts from either Toijala or Tampere, and then proceeds towards Nokia on the Tampere–Pori railway. All stations on the section are served by its commuter trains.

=== Long-distance trains ===
Being part of the päärata, the Riihimäki–Tampere section is a core part of long-distance transport in Finland. After Riihimäki and possibly making stops at Hämeenlinna, Toijala and Lempäälä, having reached Tampere trains will proceed towards either Pori through western Pirkanmaa and Satakunta, toward Ostrobothnia on the Tampere–Seinäjoki railway, or towards Jyväskylä in Central Finland via Jämsä. In addition, Toijala is one of the termini of the Turku–Toijala railway.

The termini of the routes that pass through the Riihimäki–Tampere line include Turku, Tampere, Seinäjoki, Vaasa, Ylivieska, Oulu, Rovaniemi, Kemijärvi and Jyväskylä.

== Future plans ==
As part of ongoing proposals for high-speed rail in Finland, the Riihimäki-Tampere railway may be upgraded for higher average speed, or a brand new line constructed parallel to the existing line.
