= Lempäälä =

- Municipality
- Lempäälän kunta Lempäälä kommun
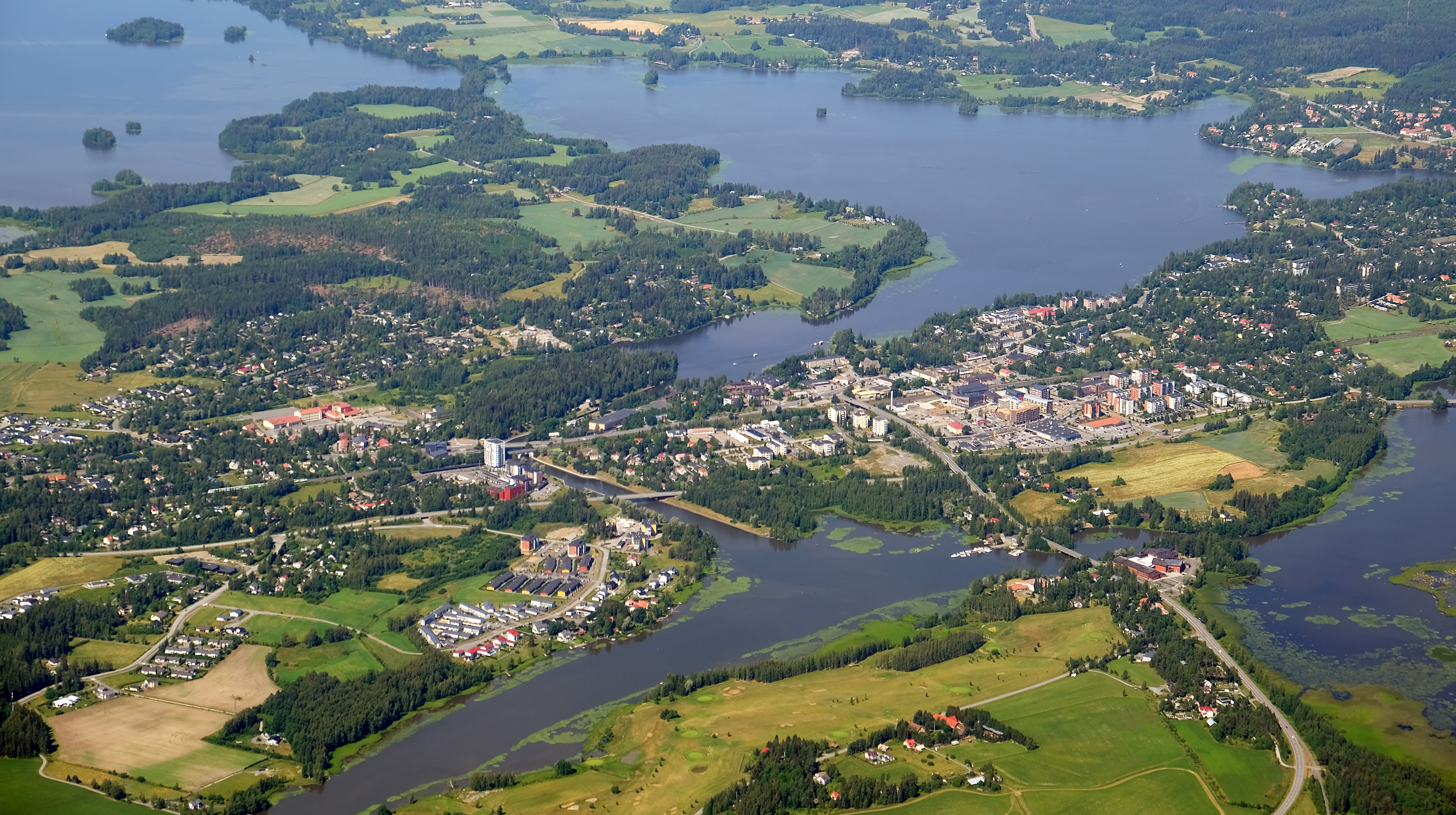
- Aerial view of Lempäälä

- Coat of arms

- Location of Lempäälä in Finland
- Interactive map of Lempäälä
- Coordinates: 61°19′N 023°45′E
- Country: Finland
- Region: Pirkanmaa
- Sub-region: Tampere
- Metropolitan area: Tampere
- Charter: 1866

Government
  - Municipality manager: Heidi Rämö

Area (2018-01-01)
  - Total: 307.06 km^{2} (118.56 sq mi)
  - Land: 269.58 km^{2} (104.09 sq mi)
  - Water: 37.51 km^{2} (14.48 sq mi)
  - Rank: 241st largest in Finland

Population (2025-12-31)
  - Total: 25,041
  - Rank: 41st largest in Finland
  - Density: 92.89/km^{2} (240.6/sq mi)

Population by native language
  - Finnish: 96.4% (official)
  - Swedish: 0.3%
  - Others: 3.3%

Population by age
  - 0 to 14: 22.3%
  - 15 to 64: 60.8%
  - 65 or older: 16.9%
- Time zone: UTC+02:00 (EET)
  - Summer (DST): UTC+03:00 (EEST)
- Website: www.lempaala.fi

Lempäälä (Finnish: [ˈlempæːlæ]) is a municipality in Finland, located in the Pirkanmaa region. It lies south of the regional capital, Tampere. The population of Lempäälä is approximately 25,000, while the metropolitan area has a population of approximately 428,000. It is the 41st most populous municipality in Finland.

The municipality covers an area of 307.06 square kilometres (118.56 sq mi) of which 37.51 km^{2} (14.48 sq mi) is water. The population density is 92.89 inhabitants per square kilometre (240.6/sq mi).

The centre of Lempäälä lies on an isthmus between Lakes Vanajavesi and Pyhäjärvi, which are connected by the Kuokkalankoski Rapids and the Lempäälä Canal, which was built in the 1870s and is still in use. There is a geographical feature in Lempäälä known as Herralanvuolle, which is shaped like a male genital organ, and this has attracted attention and discussion.

== History ==
Lempäälä's historic railway station opened on 22 June 1876 with the Hämeenlinna–Tampere railway. The station building followed standard drawings by Knut Nylander and was extended in 1908 and 1922 to designs by Bruno Granholm. The Finnish Heritage Agency identifies it as the only surviving Class IV station building between Hämeenlinna and Tampere. The station and canal surroundings are included in Finland's inventory of nationally significant built cultural environments.

The first written reference to the parish of Lempäälä dates from 1430. The oldest building in the town is a medieval church named after Saint Birgitta, built in 1504. The only surviving item from the Middle Ages in the church is a wooden crucifix carved from birch.

Finnish writer Yrjö Kokko lived in Lempäälä and is buried in the cemetery.

Ideapark, a shopping centre, is located in Lempäälä along the Helsinki-Tampere motorway (E12).

The former Piippo factory near Lempäälä railway station was completed in 1946. Piippo ceased operating at the factory in 2005, after which the building, known as Piippokeskus, accommodated office, storage and commercial premises. A draft zoning amendment presented in May 2026 proposed a cultural centre and housing on the site. The proposal envisaged demolition of much of the factory while seeking to retain its recognizable office portion as a reminder of the area's industrial history.

== Archaeology ==
In May 2017, archaeologists from the University of Turku identified a medieval burial ground in Aimala. The trial excavations did not reveal traces of a church building. Approximately ten graves containing the remains of adults or children were excavated; their east–west orientation and absence of grave goods supported the researchers' interpretation of the site as a Christian cemetery.

Radiocarbon dating placed the burials investigated in 2017 mainly in the fourteenth century. Aimalankangas is included in the inventory of nationally significant archaeological sites (VARK), which identifies its long use as a settlement and burial ground, archaeological diversity and research potential as reasons for its significance.

== Kuokkala ==
Kuokkala is a neighbourhood to the north of Lempäälä town which houses a ’museoraitti’ (museum trail). Several buildings now house collections of historical items, including a shop museum (also a shop and information office), hairdressers & barbers, cobblers, WW2 memorabilia, household equipment, blacksmiths, carpenters, a 19th-century Finnish dwelling, and a special exhibit relating to the ex-Finnish region of Sakkola.

== Nature ==
Ahtialanjärvi is a shallow lake near Lempäälä's municipal centre and an important breeding and migratory stopover site for birds. Its Natura 2000 Special Protection Area covers 159 hectares. Volunteer habitat management on the lake's Lokkisaari island began in 1998. Conservation work has included annual mowing, enlargement of Lokkisaari, and construction of artificial nesting islands and nest boxes.

Ahtialanjärvi's water level is affected by regulation of the Vanajavesi–Pyhäjärvi waterway, which the environmental administration identifies as a threat to successful nesting. During the winter preceding April 2024, volunteers raised artificial nesting islands to protect nests from rising water, with funding from Metsähallitus through the Helmi programme. In Yle's April 2024 report, conservation volunteer Rainer Mäkelä reported that the number of breeding common pochard pairs had increased from three when the restoration work began to twenty.

== Demographics ==
Population size 1990–2025
Year	Population
1990	14,564
1995	15,395
2000	16,331
2005	18,248
2010	20,588
2015	22,536
2020	23,828
2025	25,041

== Politics ==
In the 2023 parliamentary elections, Lempäälä voted as such:

- National Coalition Party - 26.0%
- Finns Party - 22.0%
- Social Democratic Party - 21.8%
- Centre Party - 7.4%
- Green League - 6.6%
- Christian Democrats - 6.3%
- Left Alliance - 4.4%
- Movement Now - 3.1%
- Freedom Alliance - 1.0%

== International relations ==
=== Twin towns — Sister cities ===
Lempäälä is twinned with:

- Ulricehamn, Sweden
- Øvre Eiker, Norway
- Kerteminde, Denmark
- Tapolca, Hungary
- Castiglione del Lago, Italy

== Villages ==
- Aimala

== See also ==
- Nokia, Finland
- Pirkkala
- Puntala-rock, a punk rock festival
