= Toijala railway station =

Railway station in Akaa, Finland

Toijala
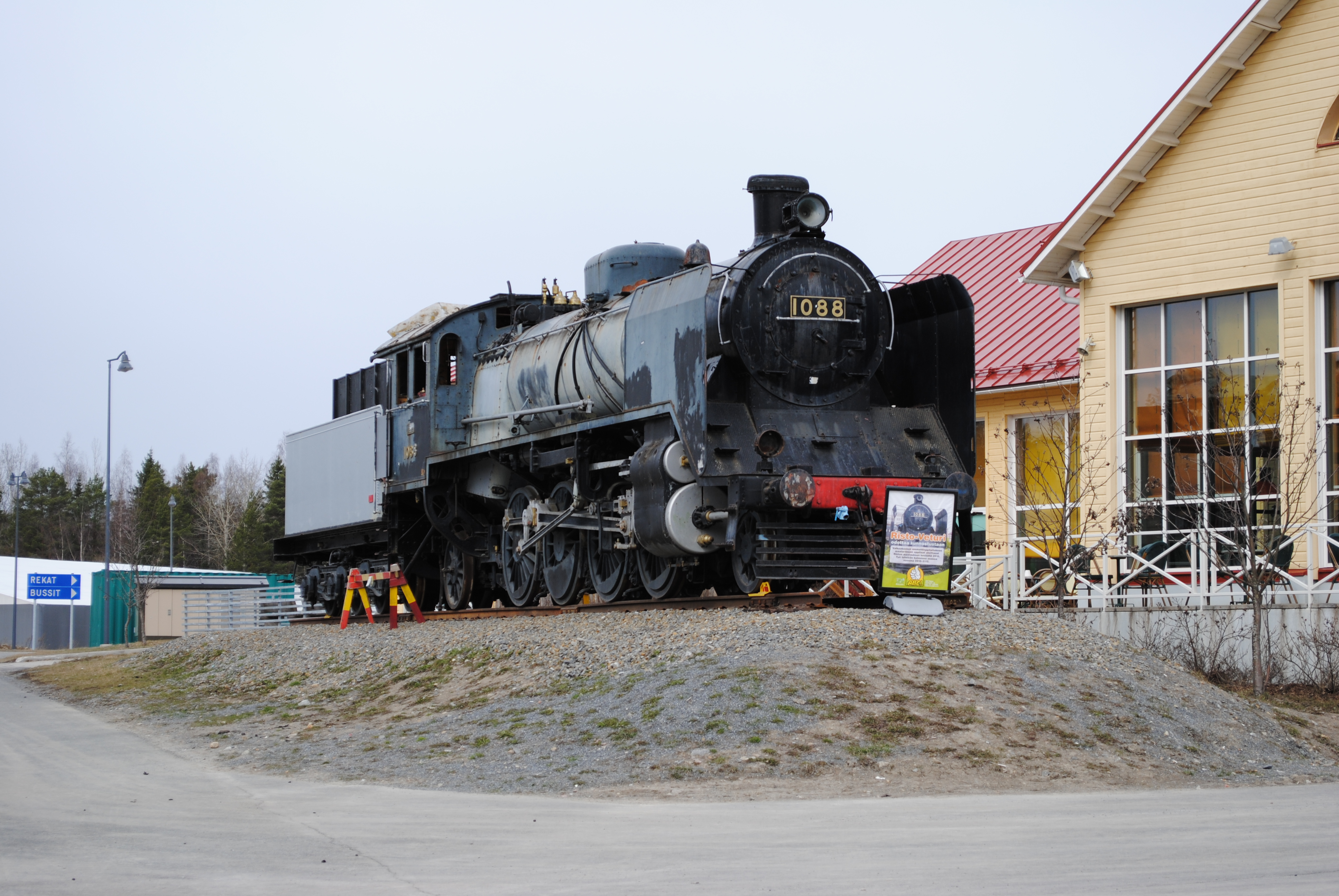
- A VR Class Tr1 steam locomotive no. 1088 in Toijala

General information
- Coordinates: 61.170791°N 23.859987°E
- System: VR station
- Owner: Finnish Transport Agency
- Lines: Riihimäki–Tampere; Turku–Toijala
- Tracks: 4

Services
Preceding station	VR commuter rail	Following station
Iittala towards Helsinki	R	Viiala towards Tampere
Terminus	M	Viiala towards Nokia
Preceding station	VR Group	Following station
Hämeenlinna towards Riihimäki	Riihimäki–Tampere	Lempäälä towards Tampere
Loimaa towards Turku Harbour	Turku–Toijala	Terminus
Location

Toijala railway station (Finnish: Toijalan rautatieasema; Swedish: Toijala station) is located in the Toijala district of the town of Akaa, Finland.

The station is located at a crossing point of three different railway tracks: from Riihimäki to Tampere, from Turku to Toijala, and from Toijala to Valkeakoski. Originally, all three tracks served both personnel and cargo traffic, but personnel traffic to Valkeakoski was discontinued in 1956. Nowadays, most passenger trains between Helsinki and Tampere as well as all trains from Turku to Tampere stop at Toijala.

== History ==
When the railway line from Turku to Tampere (with the Toijala–Turku section serving as a part of the northward expansion for the Helsinki–Hämeenlinna line) was under planning in the 1860s, the engineer committee assigned by the senate proposed establishing the junction station at the parish of Akaa, but was soon changed to Viiala.

The citizens of Turku wanted the junction station placed as north as possible in order for the Turku–Tampere connection to become shorter than the railway connection to Helsinki. In the end, the railway line from Turku to Tampere was decided to be built via Toijala and the station was opened June 22, 1876. The original station building, thought to be designed by architect Knut Nylander was completed the same year and was expanded in 1913, 1925 and 1947. A locomotive shed was also built in the early 1900s.

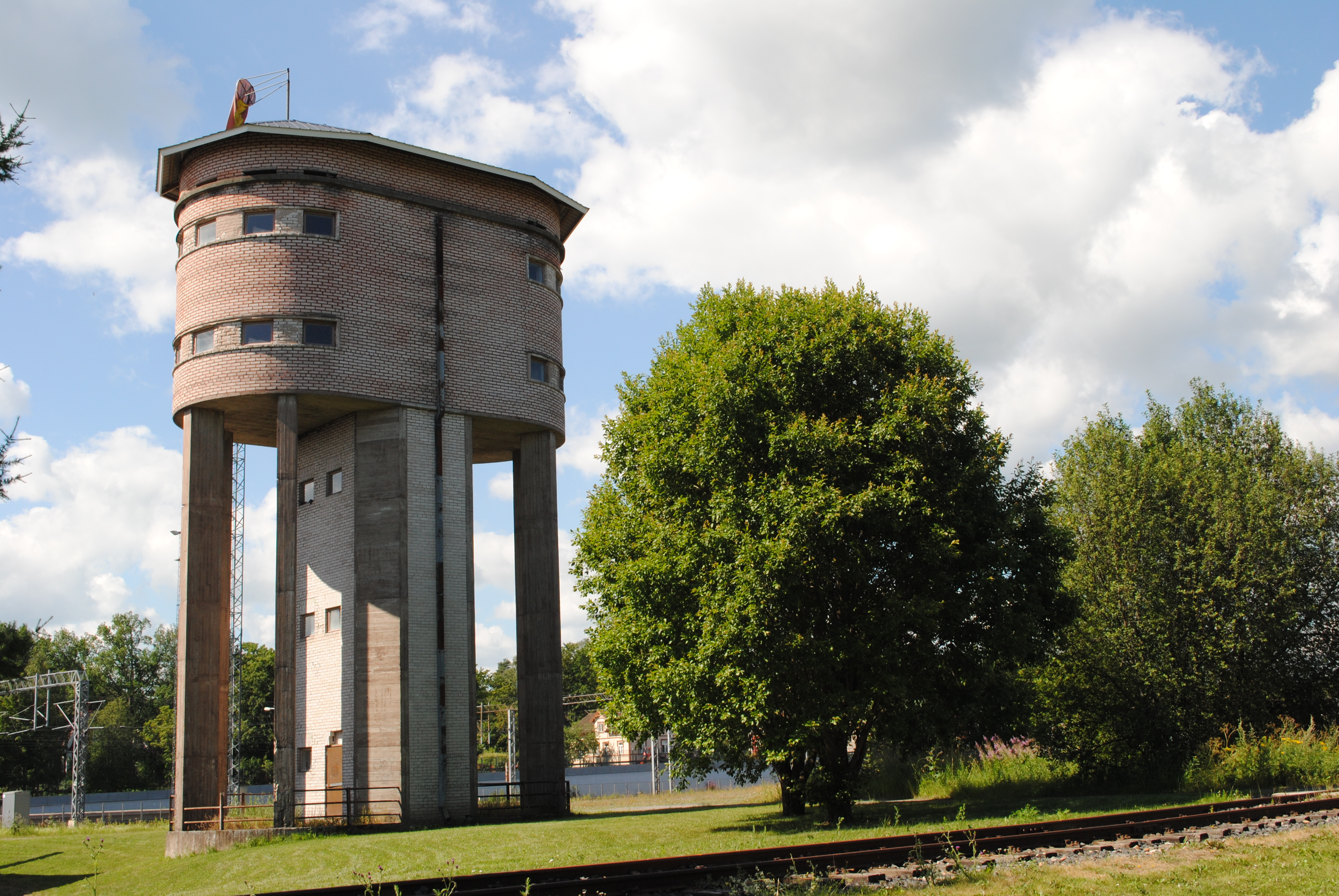
Locomotive Museum water tower

After the station was opened, some industry was established in the village. A wallpaper factory in 1903 and a large dairy in 1904. By the end of the 1910s, a community with a population of about 2 000 people was formed by the station and the industrial plants with schools, a pharmacy and a bank. There were plans to establish Toijala as a densely populated community, but were never executed. Instead, Toijala became a market town in 1946.

In 1927, a branch line from the station to the Toijala harbour was opened. The track served passenger traffic until 1941 and freight traffic until 1971 and was then closed. The track was dismantled in 1998 to make way for the motorway.

The railyard of the Toijala station was renewed in the mid-1960s and a new station building, designed by architect Aarno Raveala, was completed in 1963. The former station building was sold in an auction in winter 1964 and demolished. The locomotive shed had become purposeless by the 1970s, as locomotive maintenance had been concentrated to Tampere and a part of the shed was demolished in 1974 during the expansion of the railyard. Since 1986, the locomotive shed has housed the Toijala Locomotive Museum.

== Services ==
Toijala is a southernmost terminus of the Tampere commuter rail M train and is also served by VR commuter rail R trains from/to Tampere. The station is also served by some of the long-distance services that run between Helsinki and Tampere as well as all trains from Turku to Tampere.

== Departure tracks ==
Out of all the tracks at Toijala railway station, four of them have a platform for passenger trains.

- Track 1 is the departure track of M trains to Tampere and Nokia.
- Track 2 is used by long-distance trains from Turku to Tampere.
- Track 3 is used by long-distance trains bound to Turku and Helsinki as well as by R trains to Riihimäki/Helsinki.
- Track 4 is used by long-distance trains from Helsinki towards Tampere as well as by R trains to Tampere.
