= Finnish Main Line =

Railway line between Helsinki and Oulu, Finland

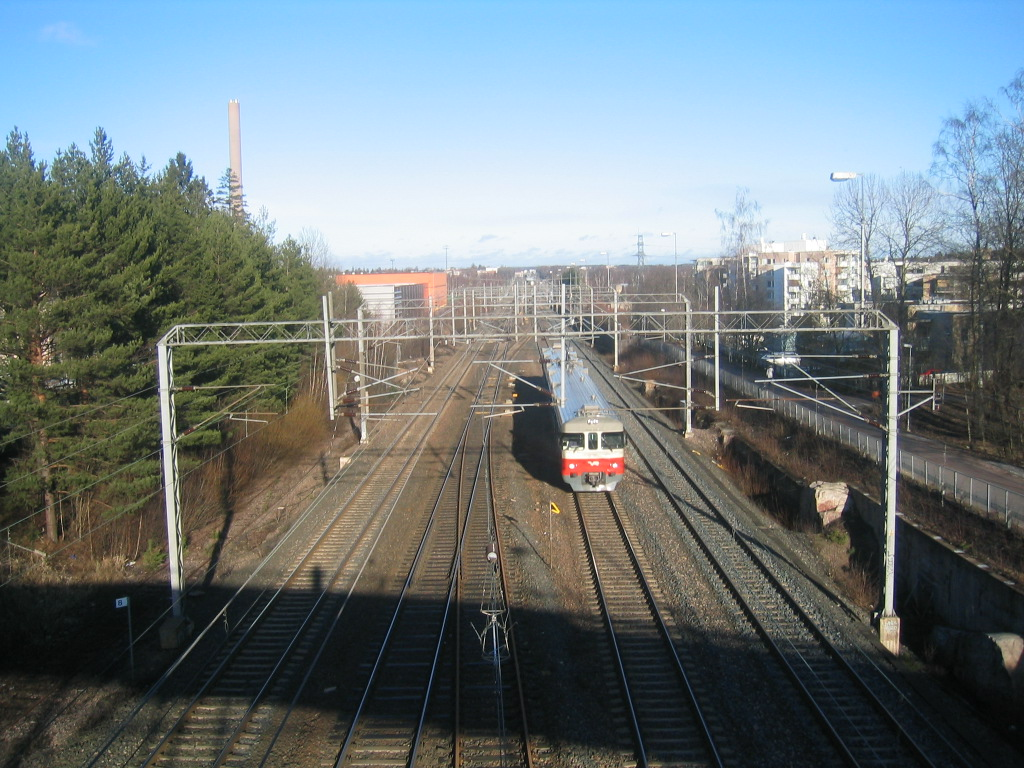
- The Main Line in Oulunkylä, Helsinki

Overview
- Native name: Finnish: Päärata; Swedish: Stambanan
- Owner: Finnish Transport Infrastructure Agency
- Termini: Helsinki; Oulu

History
- Opened: 17 March 1862; 163 years ago (Note: At the time between Helsinki and Hämeenlinna.)

Technical
- Line length: 810 km (500 mi)
- Number of tracks: 4 (Helsinki–Kytömaa, Ainola–Purola); 2 (Kytömaa–Ainola, Purola–Lielahti, Pohjois-Louko–Lapua, Kokkola–Ylivieska); 1 (Lielahti–Pohjois-Louko, Lapua–Kokkola)

The Finnish Main Line (Finnish: Päärata; Swedish: Stambanan) is a 810-kilometre (500 mi) long electrified group of railway lines in Finland between the cities of Helsinki and Oulu. The first segment, a 108-kilometre (67 mi) line from Helsinki to Hämeenlinna, was opened on March 17, 1862.

The railway serves Helsinki, Riihimäki, Hämeenlinna, Tampere, Parkano, Seinäjoki, Kokkola, Ylivieska and Oulu. The future Suomirata project aims to improve the current Riihimäki–Tampere section by either building additional tracks alongside the existing main line or an entirely new straight line. The goal is to reduce the travel time from Tampere to Helsinki from the current 1 hour 33 minutes to about an hour.

== See also ==
- Helsinki–Riihimäki railway
- Riihimäki–Tampere railway
- Rail transport in Finland

== General references ==
- "Ensimmäinen Juna Hämeenlinnaan" (in Finnish). Hämäläinen. January 31, 1862.
- Lönnblad, Reino (1992). "Suomen ensimmäinen rautatiesilta" (in Finnish). Helsingin Pitäjä.
- Uimonen, Jorma (1994). "Miksi Tikkurilan asemasta tuli niin komea? Helsingin–Hämeenlinnan radan asemien synty, osa 1" (in Finnish). Helsingin Pitäjä.
