= Parkano railway station =

Railway station in Parkano, Finland

Parkano
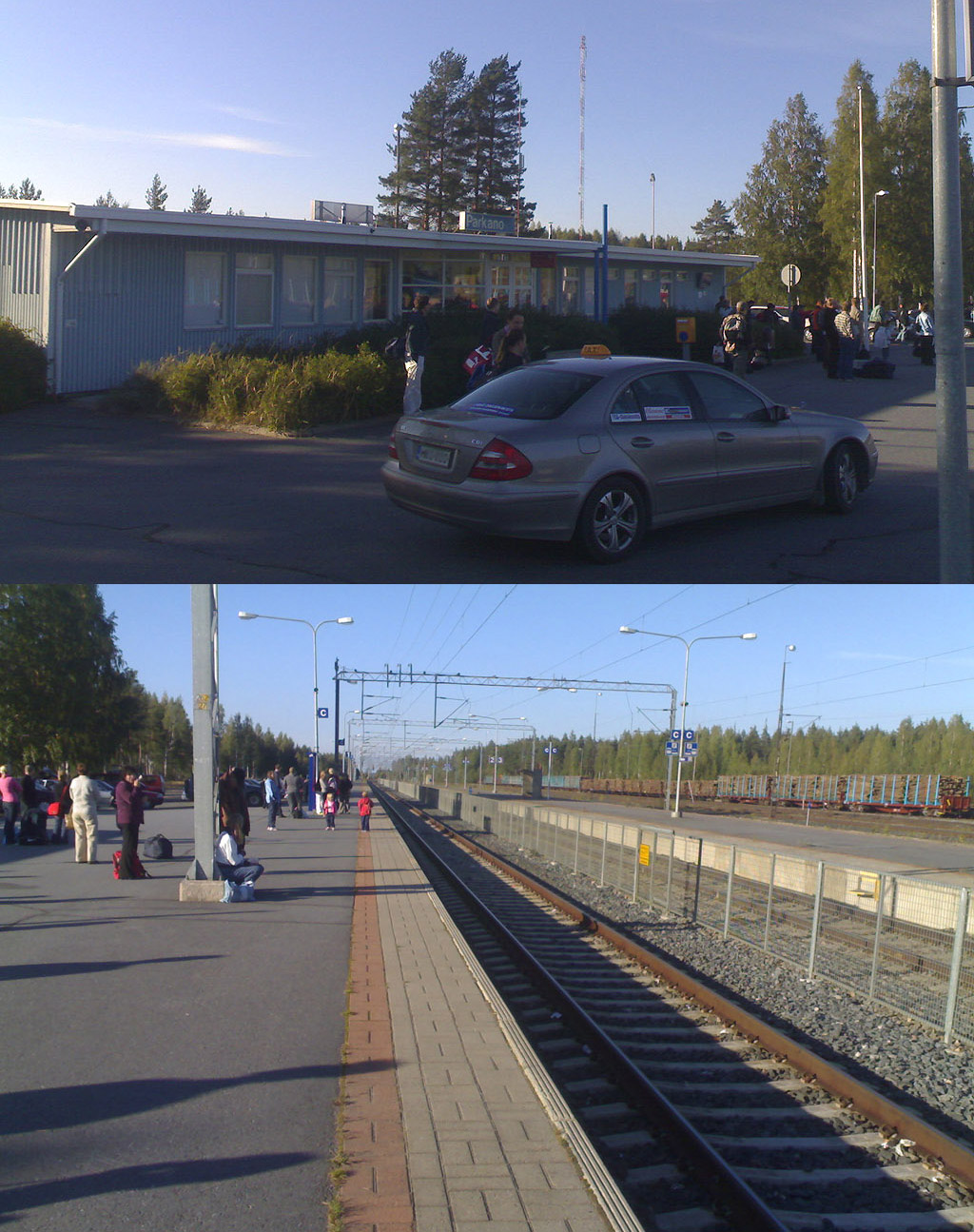
- The Parkano railway station.

General information
- Coordinates: 62°03′08″N 023°04′40″E
- System: VR station
- Owner: Finnish Transport Infrastructure Agency
- Line: Tampere–Seinäjoki railway
- Tracks: 3

Other information
- Station code: Pko

History
- Opened: 1971

Passengers
- 2018: 102,000

Services
Preceding station	VR Group	Following station
Tampere Terminus	Tampere–Seinäjoki	Seinäjoki Terminus
Tampere towards Helsinki	Helsinki–Kolari (overnight service)	Seinäjoki towards Kolari
Location

The Parkano railway station is located in the town of Parkano, Finland. The station was opened for passenger and cargo traffic in 1971, and is located about six kilometres from the Parkano main urban area. The distance from the Helsinki Central railway station is 262 kilometres (163 mi).

Up to 1970, the station named Parkano was located in the Parkano main urban area on the track between Haapamäki and Pori. The old Parkano station was renamed Kairokoski railway station when the new station was opened.

The Parkano railway station was built in connection with the more direct track from Tampere to Seinäjoki to a place where the direct track crossed the track between Haapamäki and Pori. Originally, the station was not intended to serve passenger traffic. Only after public opposition, the VR Group decided to build a temporary barracks-style station building to serve passenger traffic. This station building is still in service.

Almost all passenger trains between Tampere and Seinäjoki stop at Parkano. The station also has cargo traffic, mostly carrying raw wood.

== Departure tracks ==
Parkano railway station has three platform tracks. Normally all passenger trains that stop at the station use track 1.
