= Nokia railway station =

Railway station in Nokia, Finland

Nokia
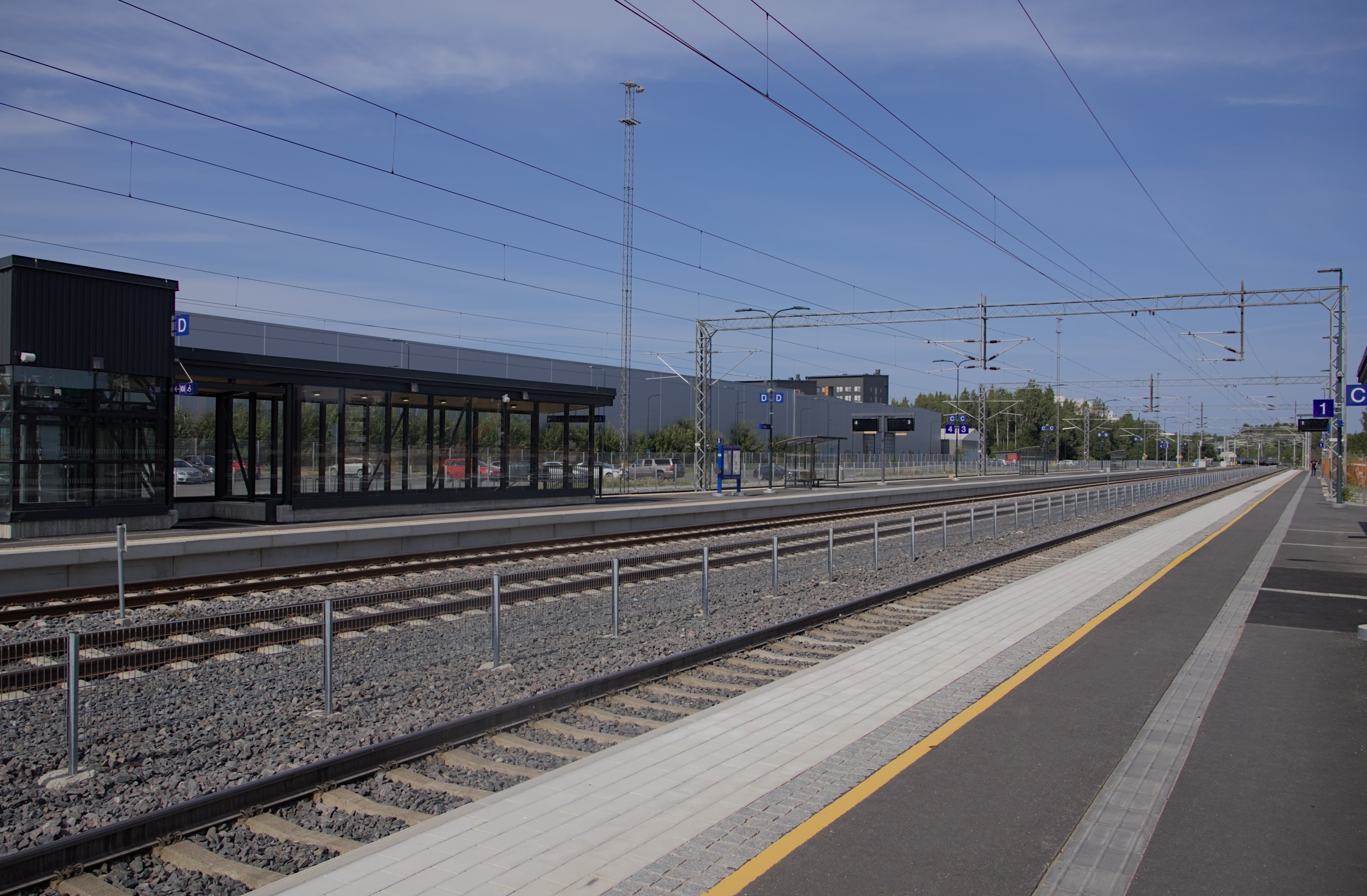

General information
- Coordinates: 61.481528°N 23.500314°E
- Owner: Finnish Transport Infrastructure Agency
- Line: Tampere-Pori railway
- Platforms: 3
- Tracks: 4

Other information
- Station code: Noa
- Fare zone: C

History
- Opened: 4 November 1895; 130 years ago

Passengers
- 2008: 60,000

Services
Preceding station	VR commuter rail	Following station
Tesoma towards Toijala	M	Terminus
Tesoma towards Riihimäki	R	Terminus
Preceding station	VR Group	Following station
Tampere Terminus	Tampere–Pori	Karkku towards Pori
Location

The Nokia railway station is located in the town of Nokia, Finland, on the Tampere–Pori railway. The station is served by long-distance InterCity traffic between Tampere and Pori and commuter trains to Tampere, with some services continuing southward to the Riihimäki–Tampere railway. There is a bus station in connection with the railway station, including a Matkahuolto cargo terminal, a taxi station, a café-kiosk and a business complex, containing a police station and a waffle café.

== History ==
The first section of the Tampere–Pori railway line from Tampere to Nokia was opened already in October 1893 to serve the transports from the local factory. A narrow-gauge railway was also built from the Nokia station to the nearby sulfite pulp plant, opened on July 3, 1894.

Nokia railway station is one of the original stations of the Tampere–Pori railway line, which was fully completed and opened in 1895. The station building was completed the same year at the latest and has been expanded in 1900 and 1906, the latter of which was designed by architect Bruno Granholm. Stylewise, the station has been built using designs of the so-called "Oulu railway line stop" style, originally used for the stations on the Seinäjoki–Oulu railway line.

A broad-gauge railway track to serve the local factories was built in 1952, replacing the former narrow-gauge railway from the factories to the Nokia station, which was then scrapped in 1961. A railway track for freight transport was built to the nearby rubber factory in 1925, followed by another one built to the nearby mill in 1940 as well as by a railway track for oil transport to the national safety stock in 1971.

Passenger traffic at the Nokia station ceased in 1992, but was re-started in 2003.

== Services ==
Nokia is the westernmost terminus of the Tampere commuter rail M service as well as the terminus of some VR commuter rail R services from Riihimäki. All long-distance train services between Tampere and Pori also stop at Nokia.

Long-distance trains primarily stop on the original side platform (platform 1). A new island platform was opened in November 2025, with commuter rail services moving there.

== See also ==
- Nokia, Finland
