= Tampere Central Station =

Railway station in Tampere, Finland

Tampere Tammerfors
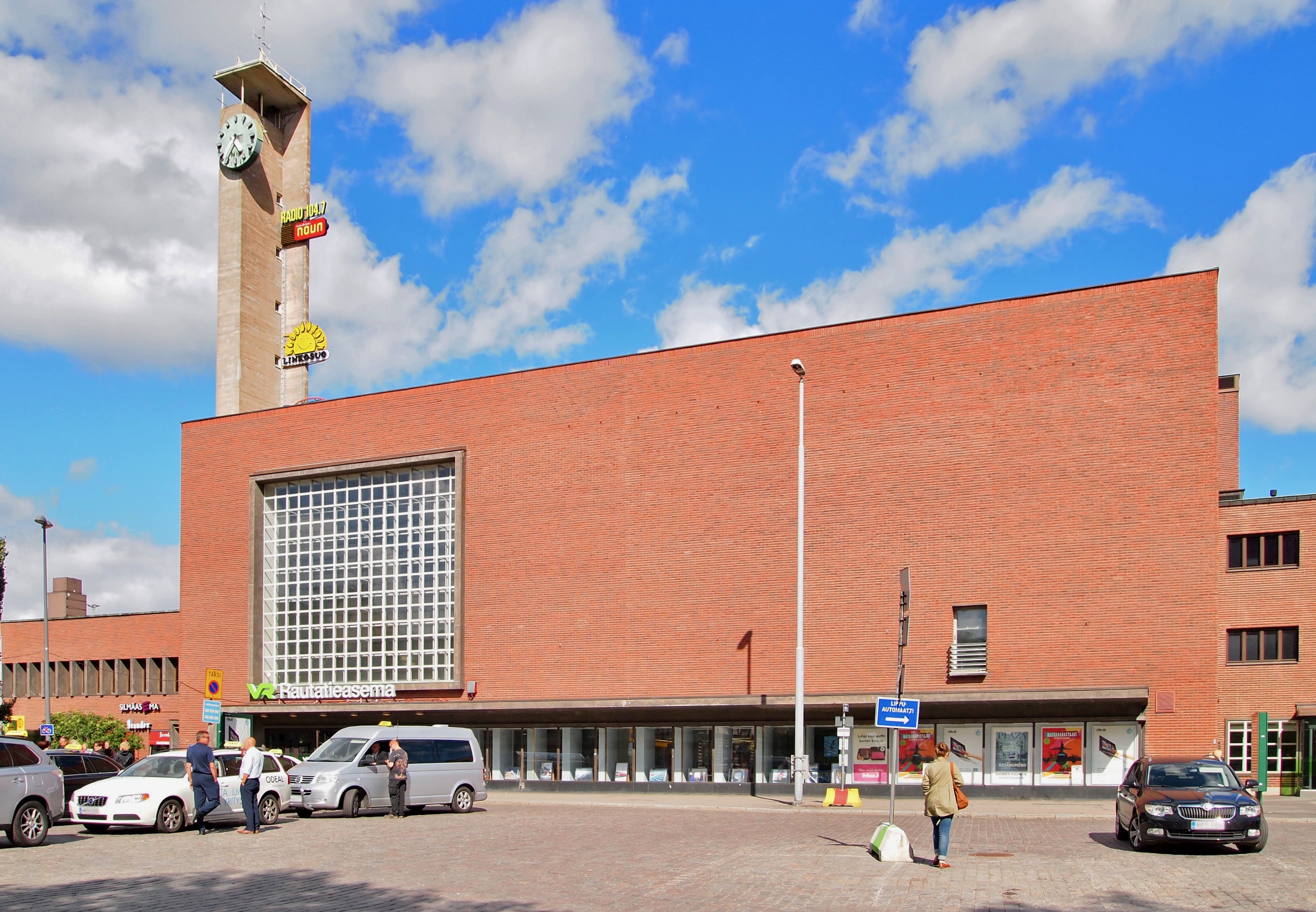
- Tampere railway station, July 2013.

General information
- Location: Rautatienkatu 25, 33100; Tampere; Finland
- Coordinates: 61°29′54.5″N 023°46′23″E
- System: VR station
- Owner: Finnish Transport Agency
- Tracks: 5

Construction
- Structure type: Ground

Other information
- Fare zone: A

History
- Opened: 1876; 150 years ago

Passengers
- 2018: 5.25 million
Services
Preceding station	VR commuter rail	Following station
Lempäälä towards Helsinki	R	Terminus
Lempäälä towards Toijala	M	Tesoma towards Nokia
Preceding station	VR Group	Following station
Terminus	Tampere–Pori	Nokia towards Pori
Terminus	Tampere–Seinäjoki	Parkano towards Seinäjoki
Terminus	Tampere–Haapamäki	Orivesi towards Haapamäki
Toijala towards Helsinki	Helsinki–Kolari (overnight service)	Parkano towards Kolari
Toijala towards Helsinki	Helsinki–Kemijärvi (overnight service)	Parkano towards Kemijärvi
Location

Tampere Central Station is a functionalist building in Tampere, Finland, designed by Eero Seppälä and Otto Flodin, completed in 1936. The station is one of the most important railway stations in Finland. In 2015, the Tampere Central Station was the second busiest railway station in Finland in terms of numbers of passengers, after the Helsinki Central Station.

The 36-metre (118 ft) clock tower was later added because the Finnish railway bureau required it (its total height from ground level is about 50 metres (160 ft)). The city's main street Hämeenkatu begins at the railway station, continuing over the Hämeensilta bridge to its western end at the Aleksanteri Church. The Itsenäisyydenkatu (originally called Puolimatkankatu) street begins at the Tammela side of the station, continuing to the Kaleva Church.

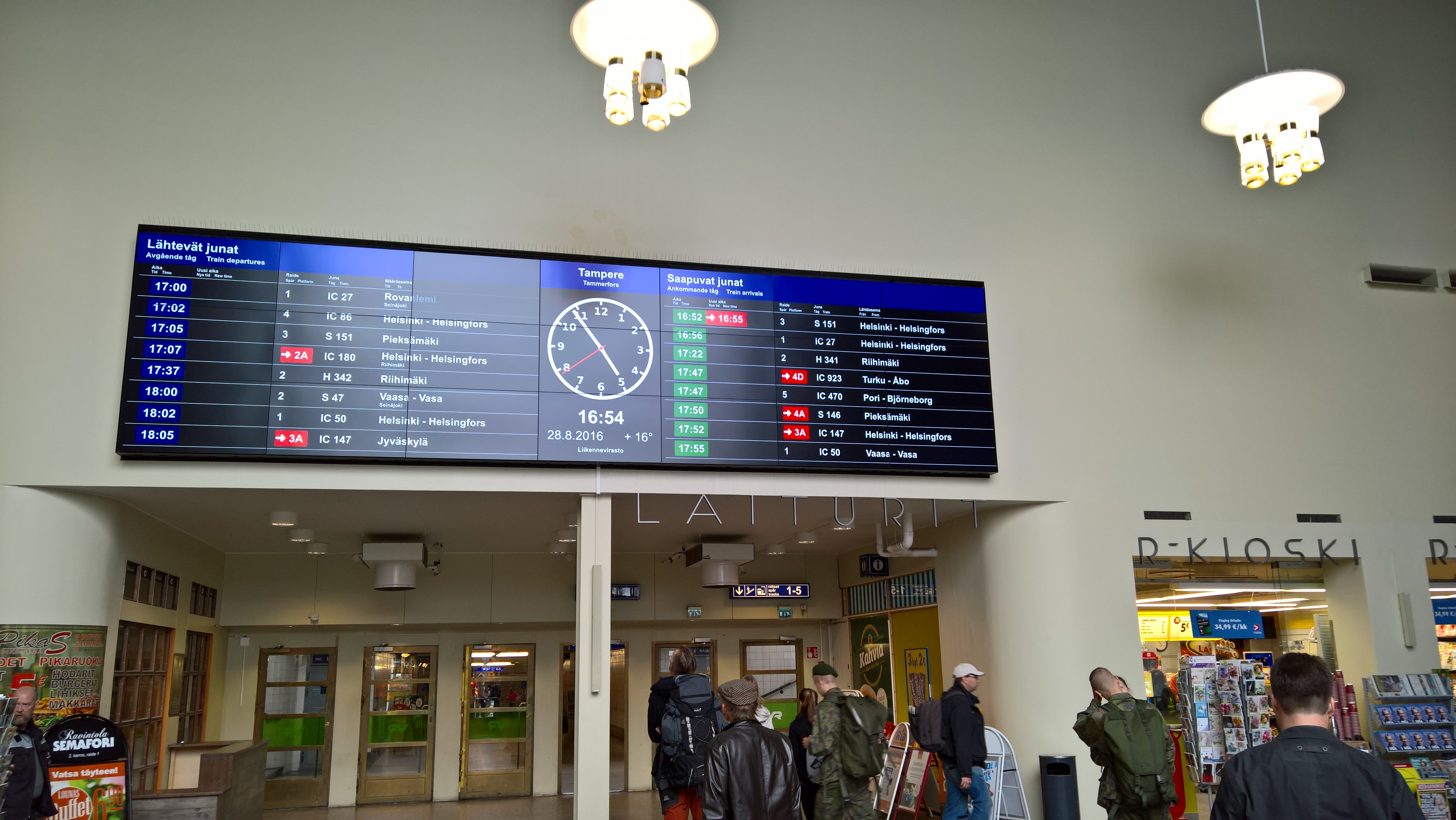
Monitor in the station building

Situated in a central location, the station and its railway yard have served as divisors of the city's districts almost in the same way as Tammerkoski: Tamperean places are often located by saying which side of the station they are on.

For decades, there has been discussion of a unified travel centre in Tampere: the long-distance bus terminal, the Tampere Bus Station, is quite far away from the railway station.

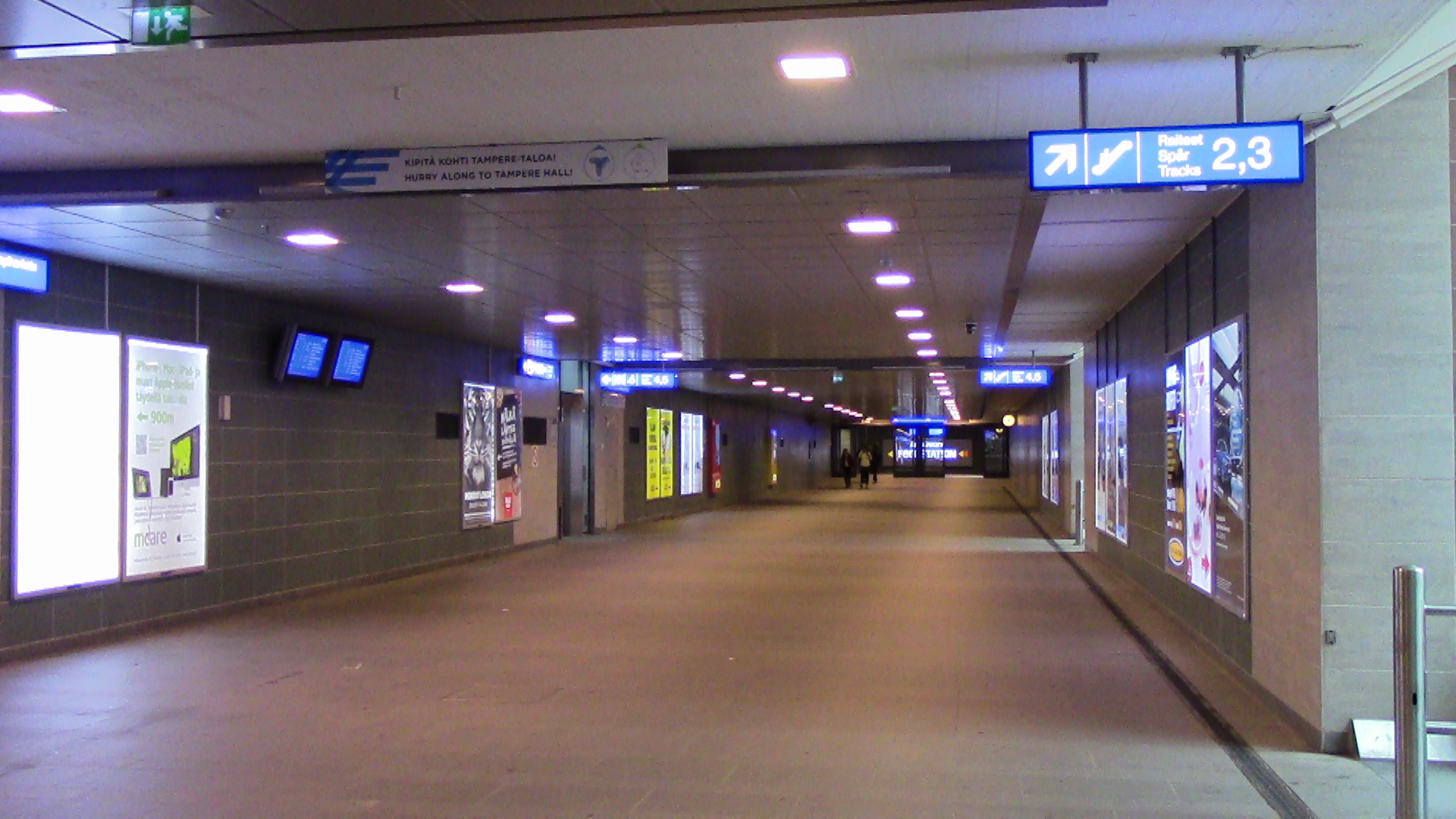
Matkakeskustunneli, a pedestrian subway under the Central Station

There are currently three platforms in the Tampere railway station, two of which have a roof. There are five tracks in total, but there are plans to add a fourth platform, making seven tracks in total.

The Tampere cargo station is located south from the passenger station. It includes one of the busiest railway organisation yards in Finland. The green building on the east side of the tracks, opposite the old passenger station is the old cargo station. A track leads from the cargo station, over the highway to Helsinki, to the Nekala district, which previously contained many private tracks servicing stock companies. Nowadays, some of the tracks have been disassembled and some are disused. The starting point of the track is used to store train carriages.

== Passenger traffic ==
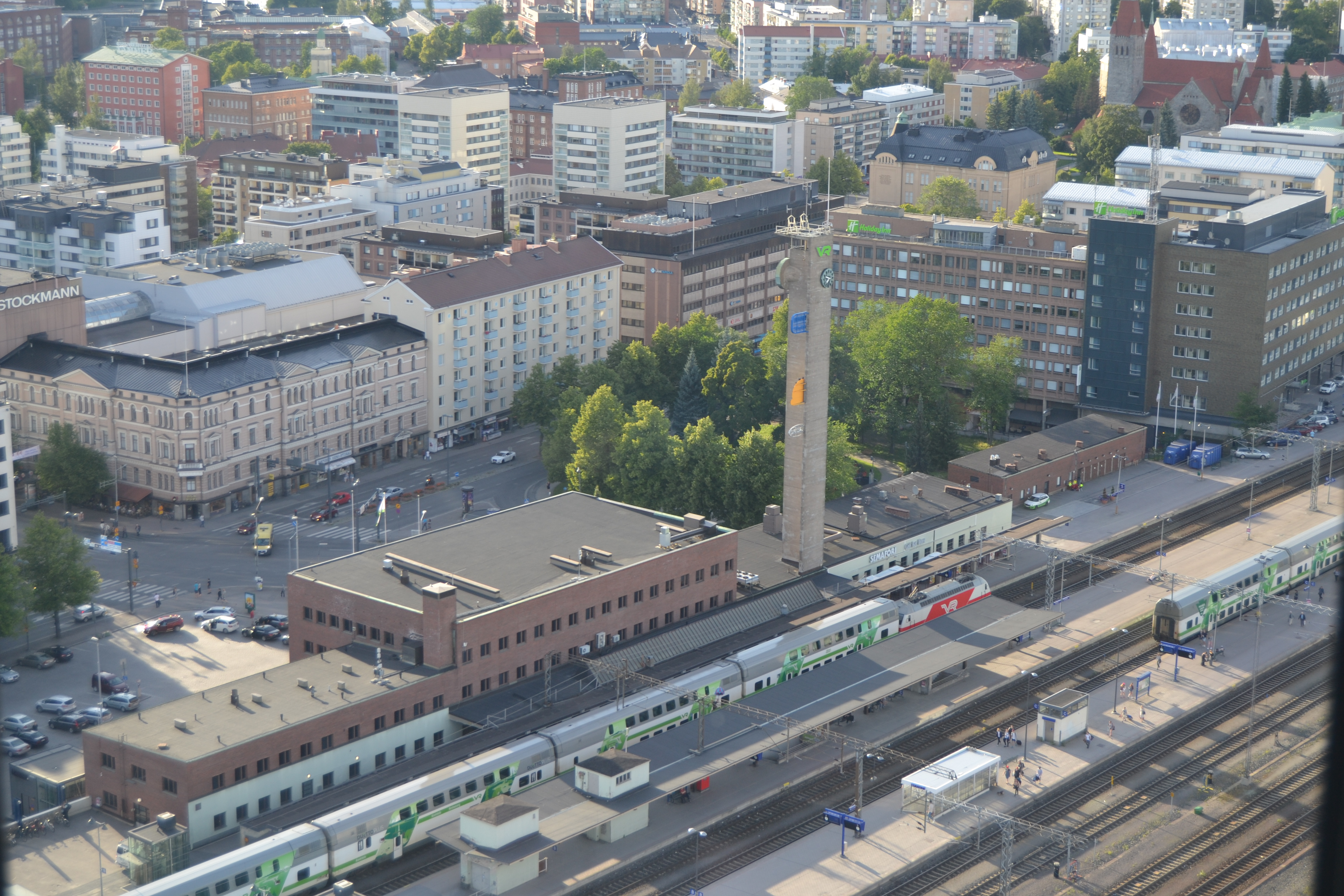
The Tampere Central Station seen from Hotel Torni Tampere

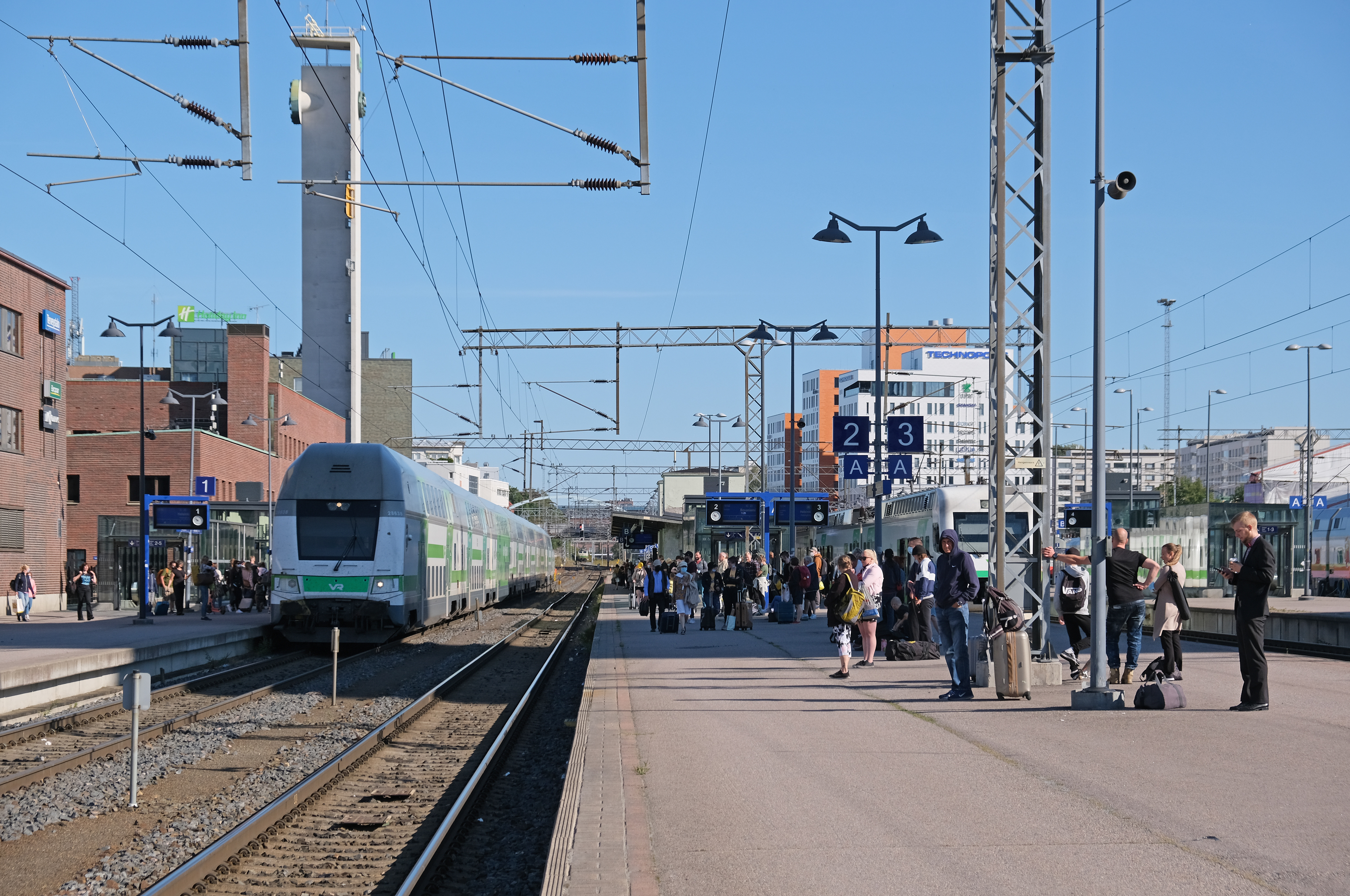
The platform level of the station

About 150 trains arrive at and depart from the Tampere railway station daily, with 4.7 million passengers using the station in 2017. Most of the traffic is towards Helsinki. Tampere also has railway connections northwards, and towards the cities of Turku, Jyväskylä, and Pori. Pendolino trains go from Tampere to Helsinki, Kuopio via Jyväskylä, and Oulu via Seinäjoki.

Since 15 December 2019, commuter train traffic in Tampere is served by M trains on the Tampere commuter rail on the route Nokia - Tampere - Toijala and R trains on the Helsinki commuter rail on the route Helsinki - Tampere. Tampere also has regional train connections to Keuruu.

=== Tracks ===
The Tampere railway station has three platforms, of which the first two are covered. There are five tracks in total, which are divided into partial tracks with separate letter identifiers in case of lack of capacity.

- Tracks 1 to 2 are mainly used for traffic to the south (Helsinki) and the north (Seinäjoki, Vaasa and Oulu).
- Tracks 3 to 5 are mainly used for traffic to the east (Haapamäki and Jyväskylä) and to the west (Turku and Pori).

=== Connecting services ===
Many lines on the Tampere public transport travel past the railway station either via Hämeenkatu and Itsenäisyydenkatu or via Rautatienkatu. The stops are located at the intersection between Rautatienkatu and Hämeenkatu.

The Rautatieasema tram stop is located near the railway station, used by Tampere light rail lines 1 and 3.

The station building has direct connections to the underground Noutoparkki and P-Hämppi parking garages, of which the first one is aimed for traffic to the railway station with free parking for half an hour. P-Hämppi and the parking garage P-Asema located near the station are intended for long-term parking. The Asema-aukio square on the Rautatienkatu side holds a taxi station, parking for buses and a small number of parking spaces.

Parking spaces for bicycles are available at the level of platform 1 and at a site with camera surveillance at the ground floor of P-Asema. The station is accessible on foot from the Asema-aukio square and from the Itsenäisyydenkatu and Ratapihankatu streets.

== History ==
When the railway from Hämeenlinna to Tampere was being planned, there were two options for the location for the Tampere railway station. The western option assumed the railway would eventually continue to Ostrobothnia via Kyröskoski, so the railway would have crossed the Tammerkoski rapids at Ratinanniemi and the railway station would have been located at the site of the Hämeenpuisto park. A branch terminal line to the Mustalahti harbour on the shore of lake Näsijärvi would also have been constructed. In the eastern option, the railway to Ostrobothnia would have been directed towards Orivesi, leaving the station located far away in the municipality of Messukylä. The citizens of Tampere were in favour of the western option, as the city of Tampere was entirely located to the west of the Tammerkoski rapids at the time and the eastern option would have left the railway station behind the then-notorious suburb of Kyttälä. However, the railway was still built according to the eastern option, as there was an area suitable for the station to the southeast of Kyttälä, allowing the railway to extend towards Orivesi as well as to Kyröskoski according to the original western option. In its northern end, the railway was extended to the Naistenlahti harbour on the shore of lake Näsijärvi.

The first, wooden station building, predating the current station, was built in 1876 to service traffic in the recently completed track Turku-Tampere-Hämeenlinna. The old station was built into a 2nd class station according to specific plans contradicting the overall track design. Its designer is thought to have been Knut Nylander. At the time, the station building bore a resemblance to the Lahti, Toijala and Vaasa railway stations, of which only the Vaasa railway station survives to this day. The engine sheds were located to the east of the railway yard, of which the northern part with 12 berths was completed already in 1874. The southern part was completed in 1896, and both sheds were expanded in the 1920s and 1930s. A cargo station designed by Bruno Granholm was built to the north of the engine sheds in 1905, which was expanded in 1922 and 1980.

Tampere was originally the northern terminus of the Hämeenlinna-Tampere railway, opened in 1876. It was the northernmost station in Finland until 1882 when the line was extended to Vaasa. However, Tampere soon became an important intersection station for railways in three directions. The so-called old Ostrobothnia railway was opened in 1883, curving to the east from the southern end of the railway yard. The Tampere–Pori railway, opened in 1895, started from the northern end of the railway yard and curved across the Tammerkoski rapids to the west, bypassing the city centre to the north. As traffic increased, an overpass bridge connecting the districts of Kyttälä and Tammela was built in 1898. A rail yard was built along the main track at Hatanpää.

As the railway was built, the Tampere railway station was still located outside the city limits in the municipality of Messukylä. The Kyttälä area to the west of the station was annexed to the city of Tampere already one year after the railway was opened for traffic, and was made a part of the city centre of Tampere during the next couple of decades. The railway had a great effect on the growth of the industry and business, which in turn caused an increase in the population; between 1870 and 1935 Tampere's population grew eightfold. The business centre of the city expanded from the old town area to the east and the old shanty town in Kyttälä was replaced with a new modern district in the first decades of the 20th century. After World War II the business centre continued expanding to the east of the railway station into Tammela, and the focus of the city centre moved from the west of the Tammerkoski to the east of it.

Tampere's significance as a hub point for railway traffic increased further when the new Tampere–Seinäjoki railway leading from the Lielahti railway station on the Tampere-Pori line to Seinäjoki was opened for traffic in 1971.

Commuter traffic from Tampere to Orivesi and Toijala, along with the stops along the line, was discontinued on 29 May 1988 when the Tampere Central Station became the only passenger railway station in the city of Tampere.

=== Branch terminal lines ===
The branch terminal line leading from the railway yard to the Naistenlahti power plant was cut from its northern end in 2004. The southern end of the track is used for storing and organising carriages. There previously was a track owned by the city of Tampere leading over the highway to Helsinki to the district of Vihioja, where the track branched off into private tracks serving several wholesale companies. The railway connection between the railway yard and Nekala has since been cut off, and most of the tracks have been dismantled. The railway bridge leading over the highway has been used for storing carriages for the last years of the line. The bridge itself has not been dismantled.

=== Train accident ===
A train accident at the station on 2 November 2001 resulted in 47 passengers being slightly injured as a locomotive collided with a passenger train that was leaving towards Seinäjoki. The driver was moving the locomotive to the other end of the train leaving towards Turku as the train switched directions, and failed to notice that the track was not yet free.

== Station buildings ==
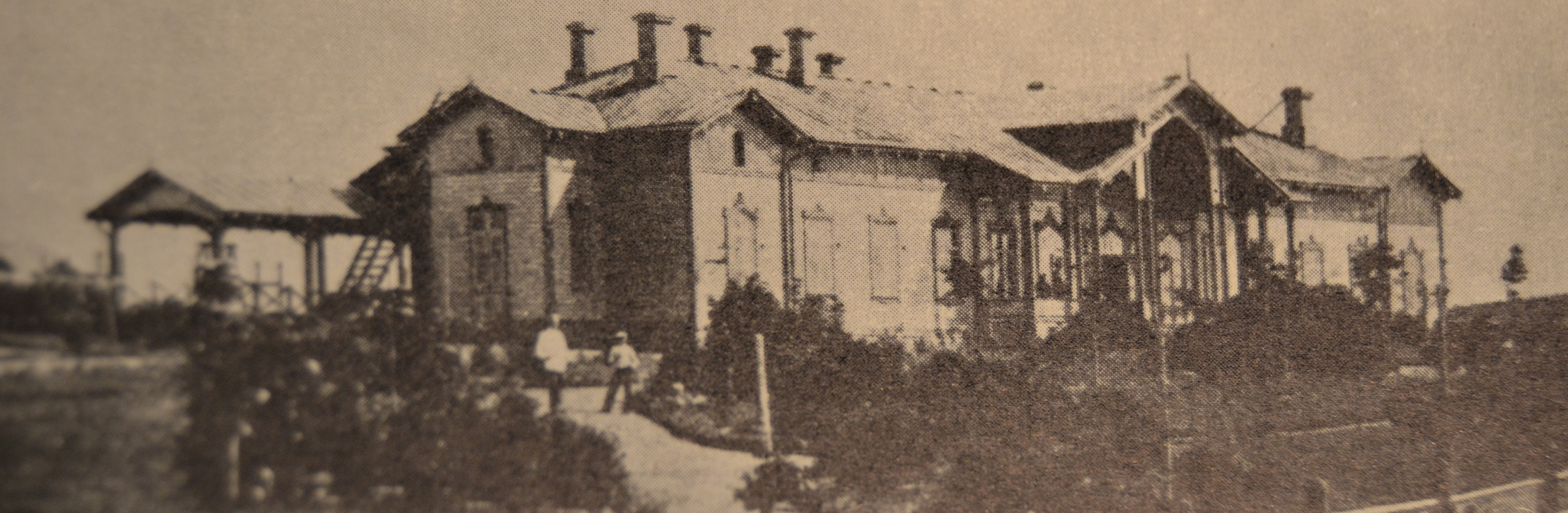
The old station building in Tampere (1876)

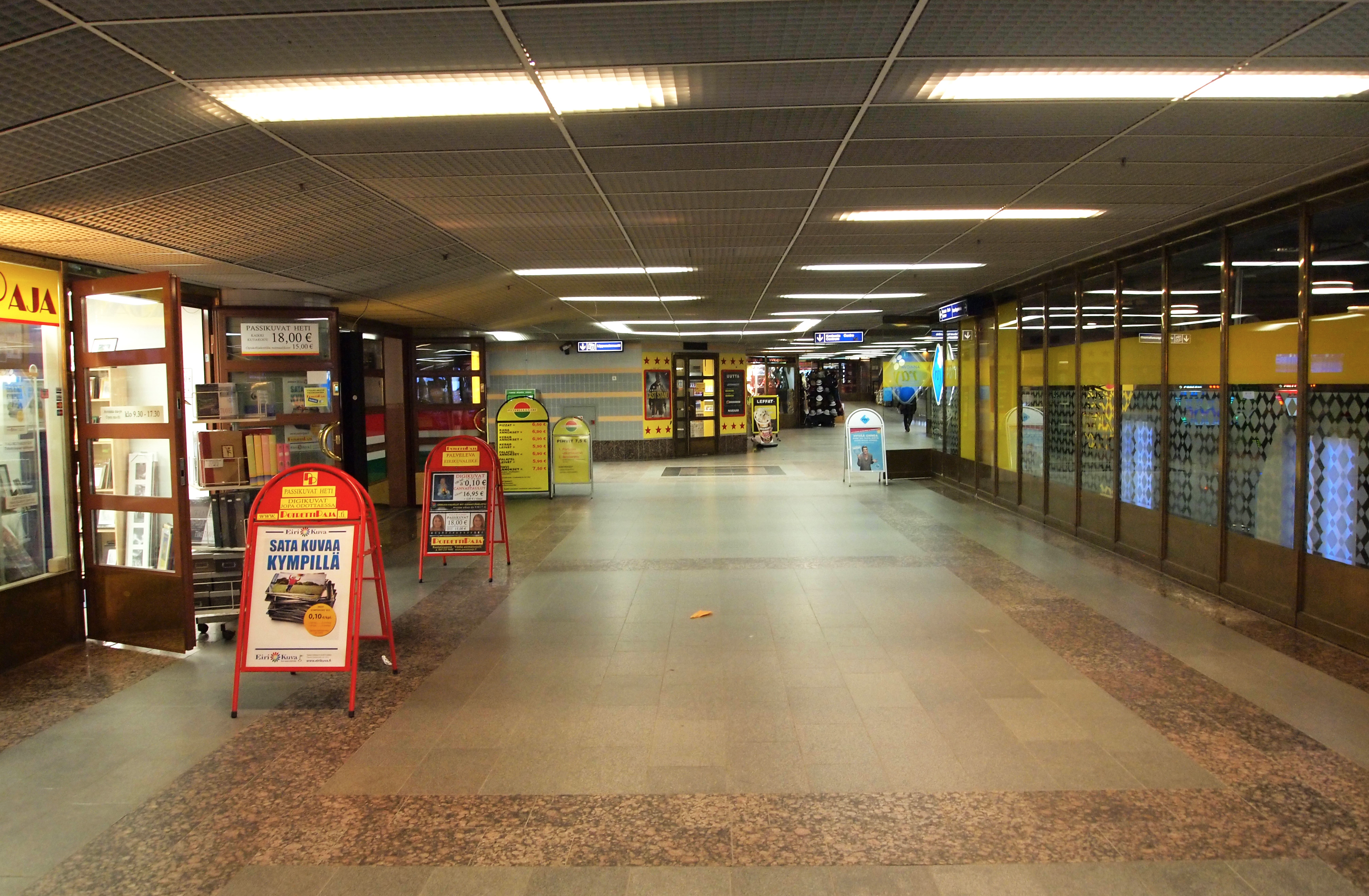
The station tunnel

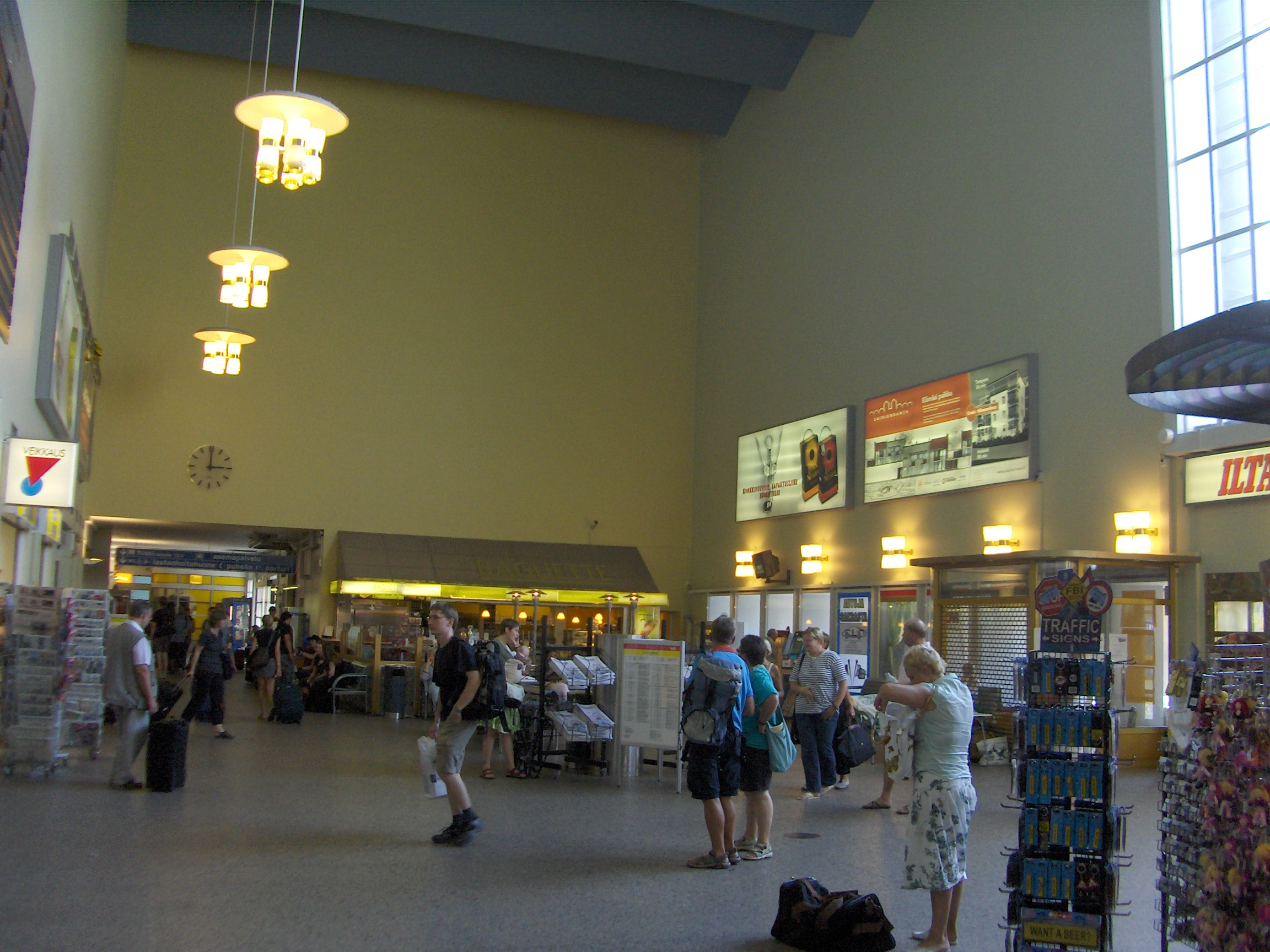
The station hall

The station served its task well in its early days, because only a couple of trains arrived in Tampere per day. However, it soon became crowded, and the station had to be expanded several times. At that time, it was decided to build a new station in Tampere, and a design competition was held. Planning of the new station building was hindered by disagreements about the direction of the underpass to be built across the railway yard.

The functionalist new station building in Tampere designed by Eero Seppälä and Otto Flodin was built in 1936. The baggage handling facilities and the large, two-floor high central hall with offices and cafés were located on the ground floor. Passenger and cargo traffic tunnels were built from the hall to the platforms. Offices, restaurants and postal facilities were located on the second floor. The platform roofs were made with a structurally special folded plate technique from steel-reinforced concrete. The 36-metre tall clock tower designed by Aulis Blomstedt was added to the plans afterwards through a demand from the railway administration (its total height from the street level being about 47 metres The tower and the northern wing of the station containing a restaurant were built in 1937. In 1948 one additional floor was built onto the southern wing of the station. The station building was moved to the administration of the VR Group in 1995. The Finnish Heritage Agency has designated the area of the Tampere Central Station as a nationally important protected site. The station building has been protected via the so-called railway agreement in 1998.

Connections between Tammela and the city centre were greatly improved when a tunnel was built underneath the station yard, completed at the same time as the new station. Before the new station building was built, traffic from the city centre to Tammela went via a wooden bridge over the railway tracks starting from the end of Hämeenkatu. As traffic increased, the bridge became cramped and difficult to cross. In the early 1930s it was decided to build a tunnel underneath the railway tracks to ease traffic. Construction of the tunnel was difficult because Tammela was located much higher than the city centre. Because of this, the elevation of Itsenäisyydenkatu was lowered by several metres. The tunnel was completed at the same time as the new station building, and so the connections between Tammela and the city centre were greatly improved. The station square was lowered to the same elevation as the tunnel.

Only very few changes have been made to the Tampere railway station over the years. In contrast, the area around the station has changed. In 1983, a shopping and parking building was built on the south side of the station. In 1989, a 98-metre shopping tunnel, known as Asematunneli (station tunnel) was built throughout the station building, containing about twenty shops. Thus pedestrians no longer had to use the cramped and noisy underpass at Itsenäisyydenkatu. At the same time, the station's ticket office moved to its new premises. A new storage area for luggage was built next to the ticket office in 1994. The new Matkakeskustunneli tunnel passing under the railway yard was built in 2008, and in 2012 a third, 60-metre long Pendolino tunnel parallel to the railway tracks was built, connecting the two previous tunnels. The Pendolino tunnel was closed for passage in 2016. In 2012 a new 75-metre long underpass tunnel under Rongankatu was opened for the use of pedestrians and bicyclists to help travel between Tammela and the city centre. The tunnel has elevator and stair connections to all platforms.

=== Cargo station ===
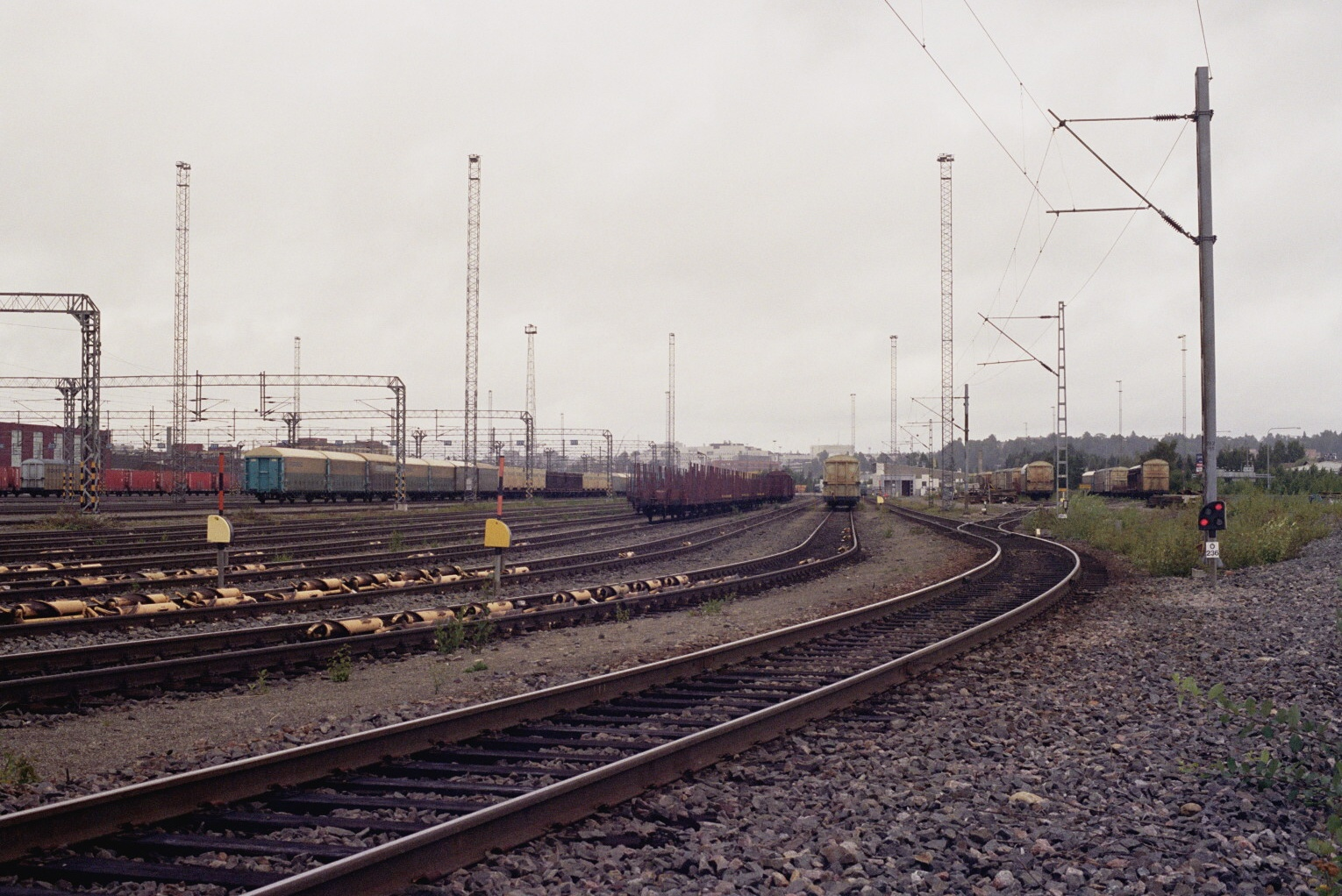
The Viinikka freight yard

The tracks were greatly renewed in the late 1990s, and the loading tracks of the old cargo station were disassembled and the locomotive garage houses were disused. Many tracks leading to nearby storage buildings were also disassembled. In 2004, the track from the track yard to the Naistenlahti power station was cut from its northern end. The southern end is used to store and organise train carriages.

The warehouses at the old cargo station were dismantled in early autumn 2009. The current cargo station in Tampere is located to the south of the passenger station in the district of Rautaharkko. It is connected to the Viinikka railway yard, which is one of the busiest railway organisation yards in Finland. The green building on the eastern side of the track opposite the passenger station is the old cargo station, whose conservation has been subject to intense debate in municipal politics throughout the 2010s.

According to the zoning plan of the area, which came into force in February 2016, the old cargo station building will be moved slightly to the east, so an adjustment of the Ratapihankatu street can be built in its place. However, the city council stopped the handling of the matter later in the same year, as the cost of the moving operation increased from 1.2 million euro to over three million euro during the investigation. The current zoning plan only allows for a solution either to move the station or keep it in place, so the city started investigation for a new zoning plan. In 2018 the city council decided to move the station after all, referring to the complaint stage coming up and to political difficulties.

== Gallery ==
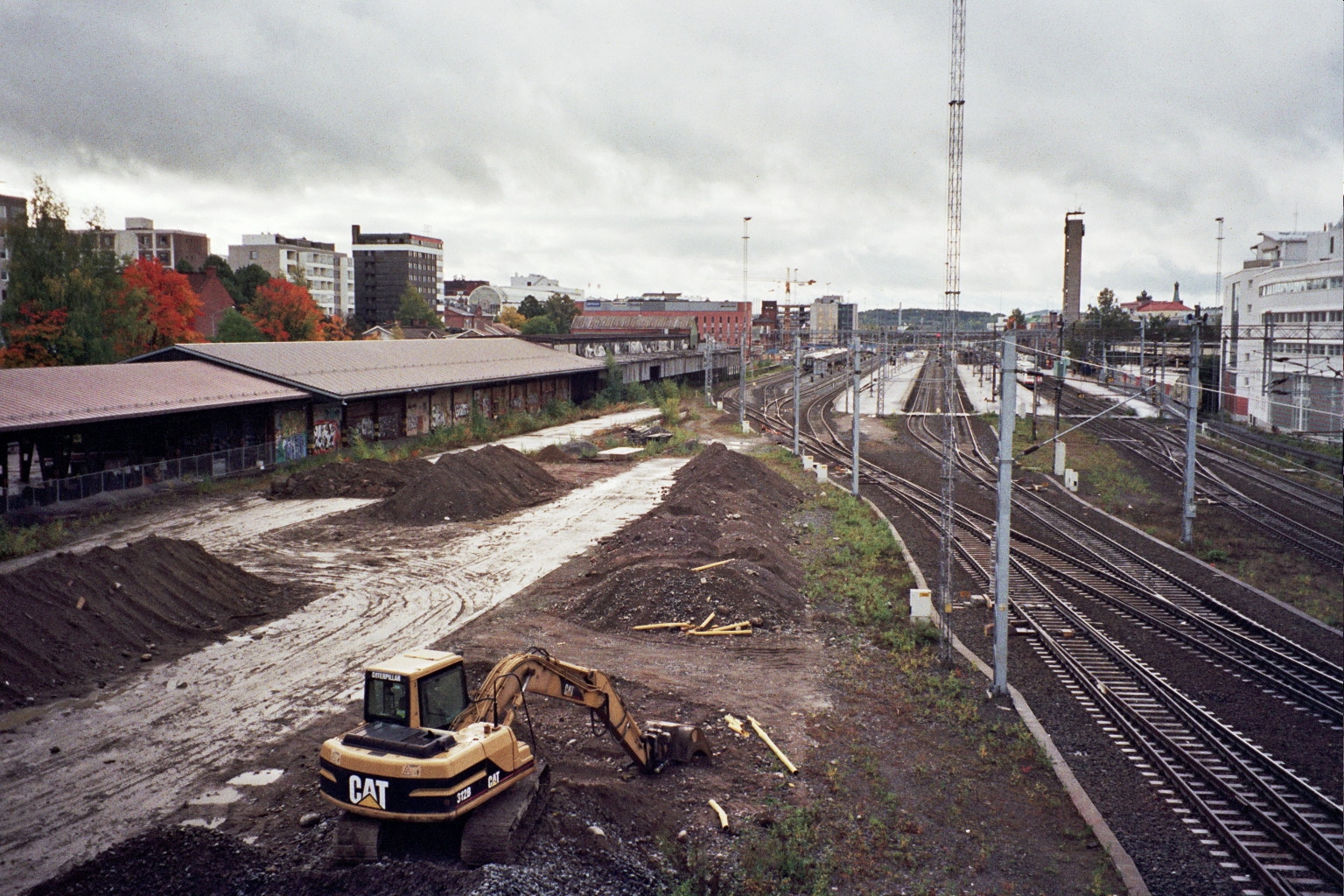
A view of the railway yard; to the left is the old cargo station, whose warehouses were dismantled in autumn 2009

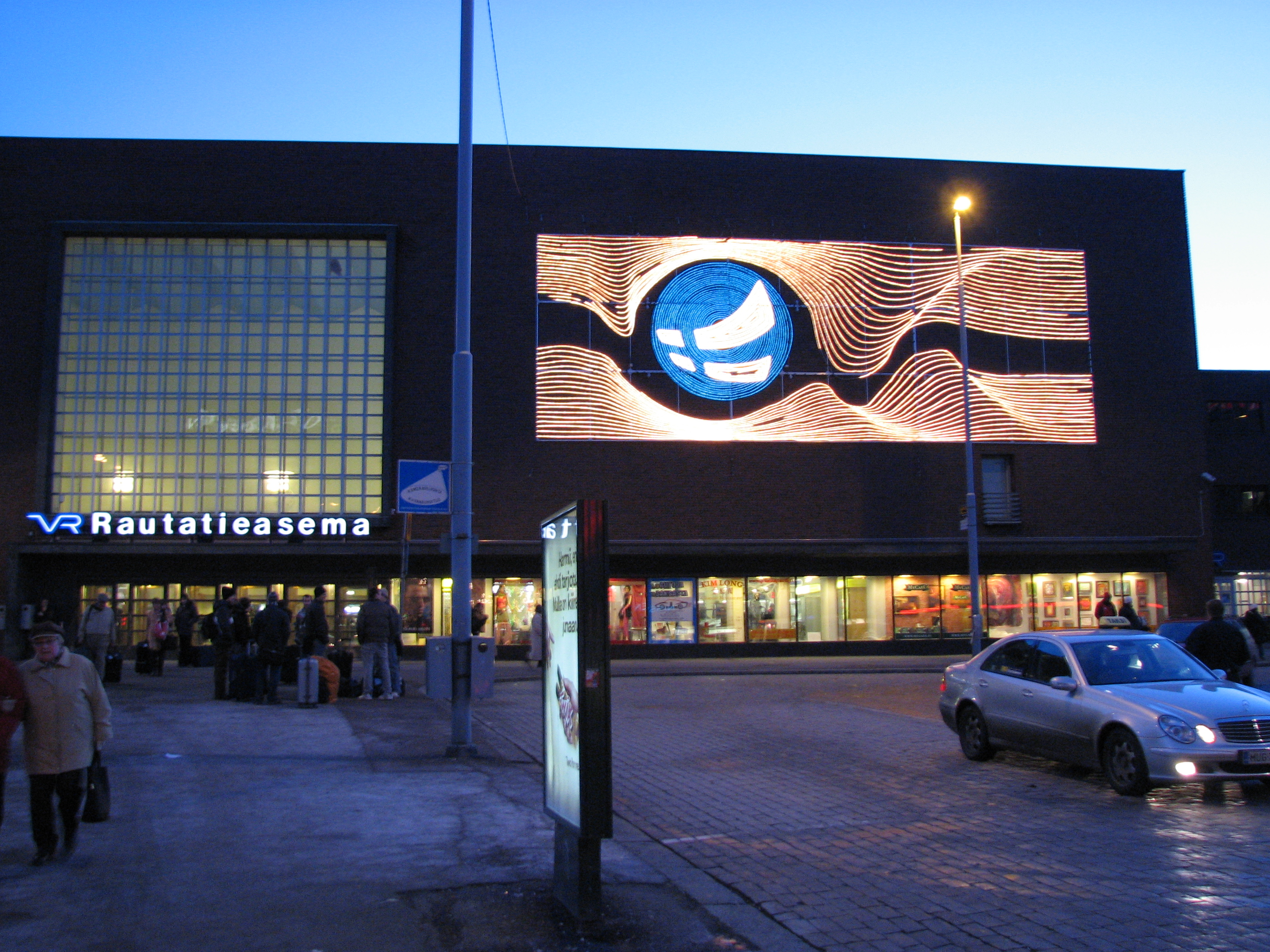
The railway station on a December morning

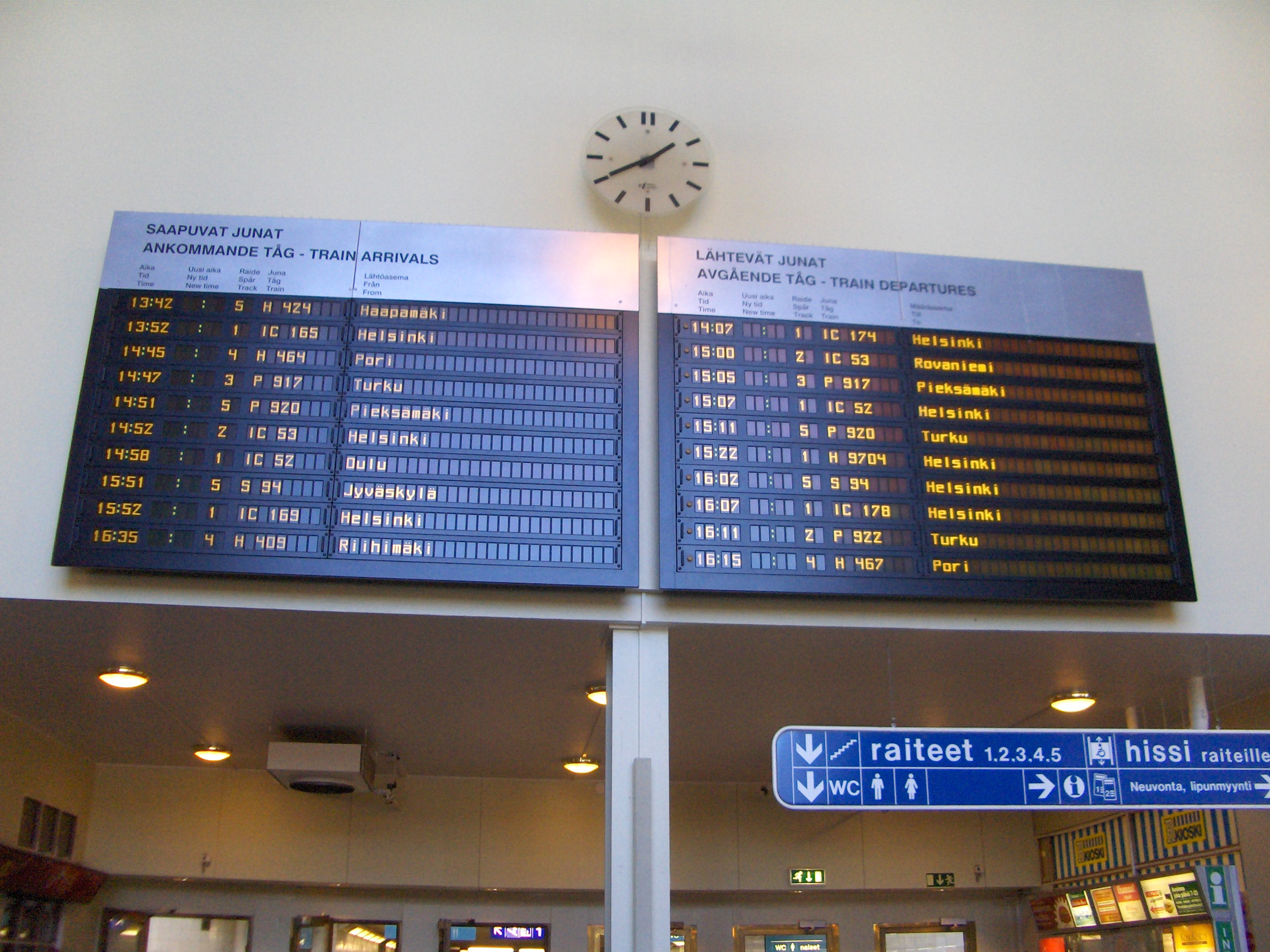
The old timetable display at the station hall

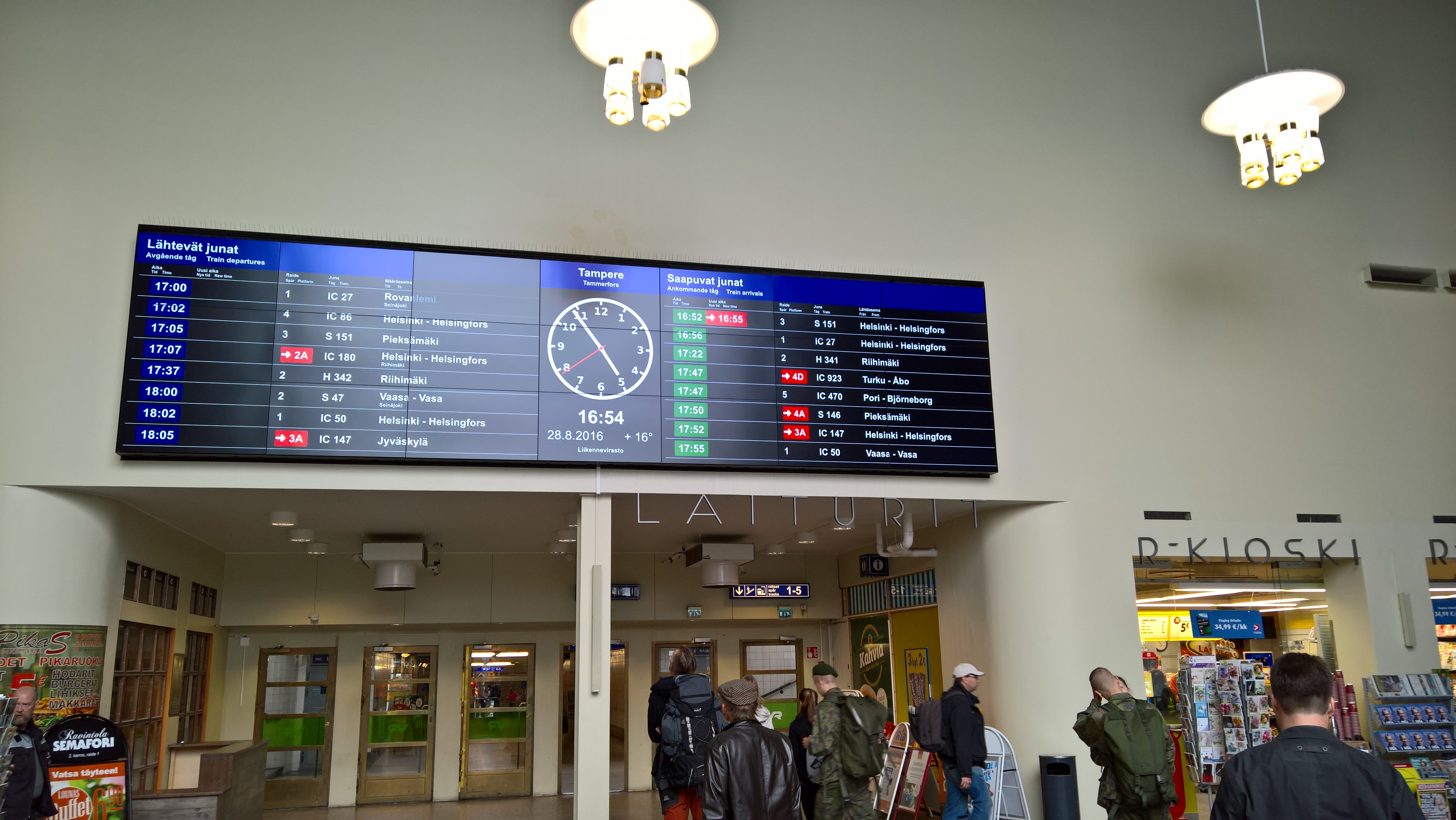
The new timetable display introduced in December 2015

== See also ==
- Hotel Torni Tampere
- Tullintori
