= Tilde Teldi =

Italian actress

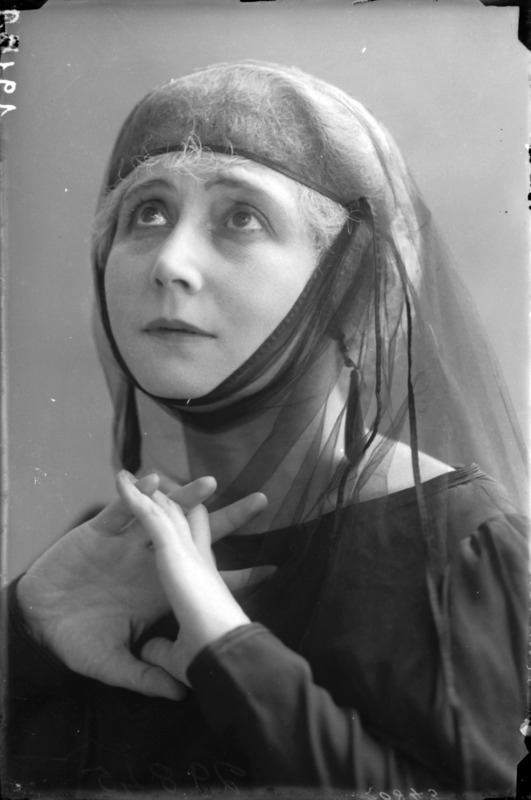
- Born: 14 April 1878; Milan, Italy
- Died: Unknown
- Occupation: Actress

Matilde Tescher, professionally known as Tilde Teldi, was an Italian theatre and silent film actress.

== Life and career ==
The daughter of a German opera singer, at a very young age Teldi became a pupil of Luigi Monti at the Accademia dei filodrammatici. She made her stage debut in 1895, and the following year was chosen by Eleonora Duse to be part of her company, with which she performed in France, Germany and Russia. Later she was part of the Compagnia del Teatro d'arte in Turin and of Luigi Rasi's company.

At the beginning of the 20th century Teldi married and retired to private life for over a decade; she returned to the stage in 1912 as prima donna in the companies of Ferruccio Garavaglia and later Ruggero Ruggeri. Beginning in 1914 she was also the main actress in a number of silent films.

== Filmography ==
- Lulu, directed by Augusto Genina (1914)
- L'istruttoria, directed by Enrico Guazzoni (1914)
- First Love, directed by Emilio Graziani-Walter (1916)
- Maman Colibrì, directed by Alfredo De Antoni (1918)
- L'odissea di San Giovanni, directed by Vasco Salvini (1919)
- La fiera dei desideri, directed by Vasco Salvini (1919)
- La più bella donna del mondo, directed by Luigi Mele (1919)
- La vergine folle, directed by Gennaro Righelli (1920)
- Fumo, directed by Vasco Salvini (1920)
- La lettera chiusa, directed by Guglielmo Zorzi (1920)
- Resurrection, directed by Flavio Calzavara (1944)
- The Gates of Heaven, directed by Vittorio De Sica (1945)
