= Parola =

Parola may refer to:

- Andrea Parola (born 1979), an Italian football midfielder
- Carlo Parola (1921–2000), an Italian football player and coach
- La parola che uccide, a 1914 Italian film
- Parola Tank Museum
- Parola (Hattula), the seat of Finnish municipality of Hattula
- Parola, Maharashtra, a city in the Indian state of Maharashtra
- Parola island in the South China Sea (a.k.a. Northeast Cay)
- Parola di ladro (Honour Among Thieves), a 1957 Italian comedy film
- Parola-class patrol vessel, a class of patrol boats in the Philippine Coast Guard
