= Dopo =

Dopo may refer to

- Dopo (clothing), a traditional Korean overcoat worn during the Joseon Dynasty
- Dopo il veglione, a 1914 Italian film
- Dopo _/ Adesso, one of two restaurants in Oakland, California run by the same person
- dopo as in "dopo festival", post festival, see Wiktionary:après
- 9,10-Dihydro-9-oxa-10-phosphaphenanthrene-10-oxide
