= Walfrid Alhainen =

Finnish farmer and politician (1869–1947)

Walfrid Isak (W. I.) Alhainen (27 April 1869 – 17 November 1947) was a Finnish farmer and politician, born in Kalvola. He was a member of the Parliament of Finland from 1916 to 1917, representing the Finnish Party.
