= Mezzanotte =

Mezzanotte may refer to:

- Mezzanotte (film), a 1915 Italian film
- Mirco Mezzanotte (born 1974), Italian ski mountaineer
- Premio Paolo Mezzanotte, a former title of the Premio Verziere, a Group 3 flat horse race in Italy
