= L'ultimo travestimento =

- Directed by: Augusto Genina
- Release date: 1916
- Country: Italy
- Language: Silent

L'ultimo travestimento is a 1916 Italian film directed by Augusto Genina. Other sources list the release year as 1915. It was produced by Milano Films.
