= Gelosia =

Gelosia may refer to:

- Gelosia (1915 film), directed by Augusto Genina
- Jealousy (1942 film), directed by Ferdinando Maria Poggioli
- Jealousy (1953 Italian film), directed by Pietro Germi
- Gelosia multiplication, or Lattice multiplication
- Gelosia (Aria), from opera "Ottone in villa" by Antonio Vivaldi
