= Iittala railway station =

Railway station in Hämeenlinna, Finland

Iittala
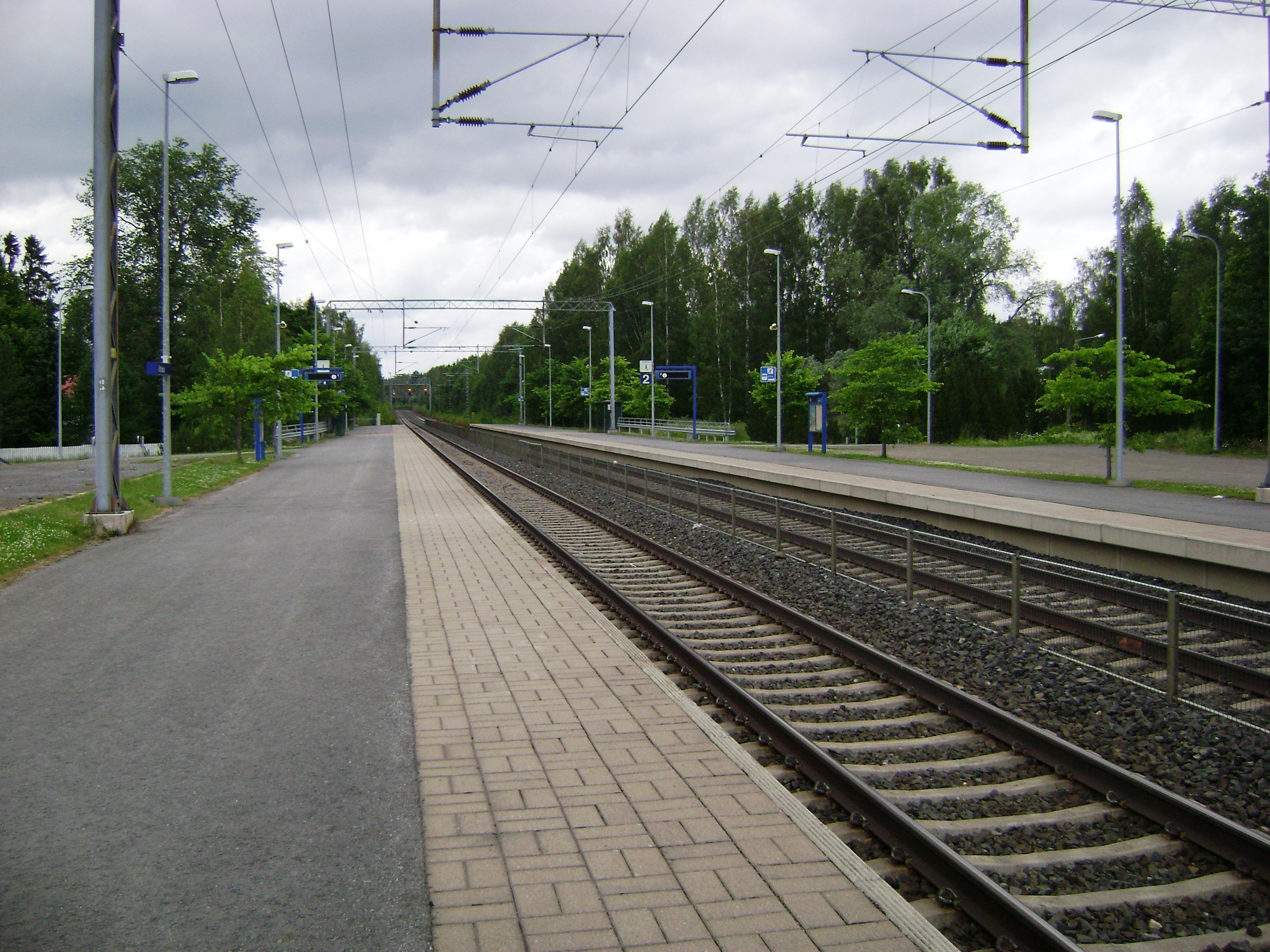

General information
- Location: Asemakuja 4, 14500; Iittala, Hämeenlinna; Finland
- Coordinates: 61°05′24″N 024°08′28″E
- System: VR station
- Owner: Finnish Transport Infrastructure Agency
- Operator: VR Group
- Line: Riihimäki–Tampere railway
- Platforms: 2 side platforms
- Tracks: 2

Other information
- Station code: Ita
- Classification: Halt

History
- Opened: 1 October 1882; 143 years ago

Passengers
- 2008: 24,000

Services
Preceding station	VR commuter rail	Following station
Parola towards Helsinki	R	Toijala towards Tampere
Location
- Location within Kanta-Häme Location within Finland

The Iittala railway station (Finnish: Iittalan rautatieasema, Swedish: Iittala järnvägsstation) is located in the town of Hämeenlinna (formerly the municipality of Kalvola), Finland, in the urban area and former municipal seat of Iittala. It is located along the Riihimäki–Tampere railway, and its neighboring stations are Toijala in the north and Parola in the south.

== History ==
Iittala railway station was originally opened as a railway stop on October 1, 1882 at the municipality of Kalvola, a couple of kilometres away from the church. The stop was promoted to a station in 1888.

The original station building, designed by architect Knut Nylander, has been demolished due to its poor condition. A warehouse building at the station functioned as a combined railway and bus station from 1973, as the former station building became disused. The station became unstaffed in 1990 and freight traffic at the station ceased the next year. The warehouse used as a station building was destroyed in an arson in 2003.

== Services and departure tracks ==
Iittala is served by VR commuter rail line R on the route Helsinki–Riihimäki–Hämeenlinna–Tampere. Southbound trains to Riihimäki and Helsinki use track 1, while northbound trains toward Tampere use track 2.
