= Il trono e la seggiola =

- Directed by: Augusto Genina
- Release date: 1918
- Country: Italy
- Language: Italian

Il trono e la seggiola (English: The Throne and the Chair) is a 1918 Italian film directed by Augusto Genina. The film is a Tiber production.

== Plot ==
Prince Lindo is destined to occupy the throne of his small kingdom. Tired of his too easy life, he sets off incognito for Italy. He wishes to pass for a painter. In Roma, he courts a young woman, Cecilia, but she declines his advances and returns to Sora, her hometown. He follows her there but is threatened by her local suitor. And both Cecilia and Lindo eventually leave together. They live on a remote coast for a time. Later, an urgent telegram arrives from his kingdom: Lindo has turned 20 and must assume his duties as monarch. He later abandons his throne to live happily with Cecilia.

== Cast ==
- Oreste Bilancia
- Piera Bouvier
- Tullio Carminati
- Alfonso Cassini
- Yvonne de Fleuriel

== Reception ==
Contemporary sources describe it as a "sentimental satire".
