= The Prince of the Impossible =

- Directed by: Augusto Genina
- Release date: 1918
- Country: Italy
- Language: Silent

The Prince of the Impossible (Italian: Il principe dell'impossible) is a 1918 Italian film directed by Augusto Genina.

== Cast ==
- Alfonso Cassini
- Helena Makowska
- Ruggero Ruggeri
- Ernesto Sabbatini

== Bibliography ==
- Moliterno, Gino. The A to Z of Italian Cinema. Scarecrow Press, 2009.
