= Il sopravvissuto =

- Directed by: Augusto Genina
- Cinematography: Carlo Montuori
- Release date: 1916
- Country: Italy
- Language: Silent

Il sopravvissuto is a 1916 Italian film directed by Augusto Genina. It was produced for Medusa Film and starred Fernanda Negri and Camillo Pilotto.
