= Il segreto del castello di Monroe =

- Directed by: Augusto Genina
- Release date: 1914
- Country: Italy
- Language: Silent

Il segreto del castello di Monroe is a 1914 Italian film directed by Augusto Genina.
