= Augusto Genina =

Italian film director and producer (1892–1957)

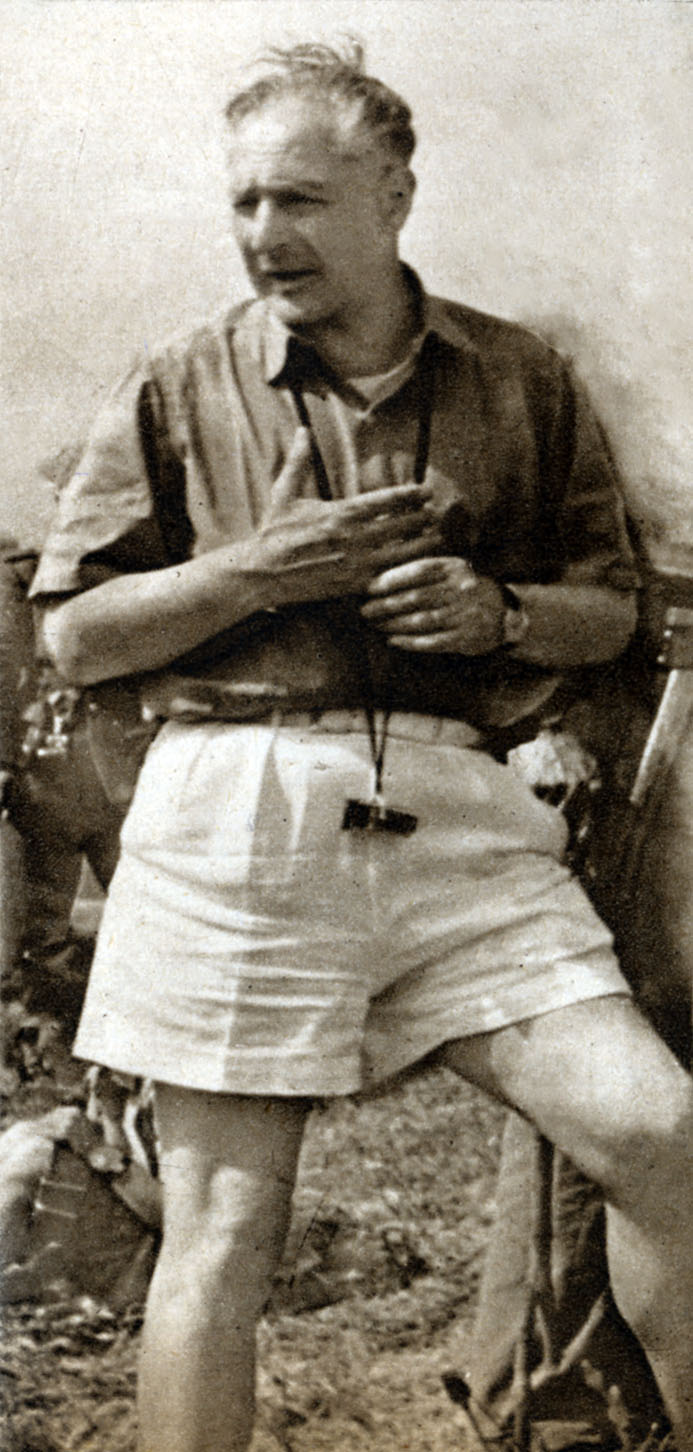
- Born: 28 January 1892; Rome, Kingdom of Italy
- Died: 18 September 1957 (aged 65)
- Occupations: film director, film producer
- Years active: 1913–1955
- Spouses: Carmen Boni (m. 1924; div. 1934): Betty Becker (died 2009)

Signature
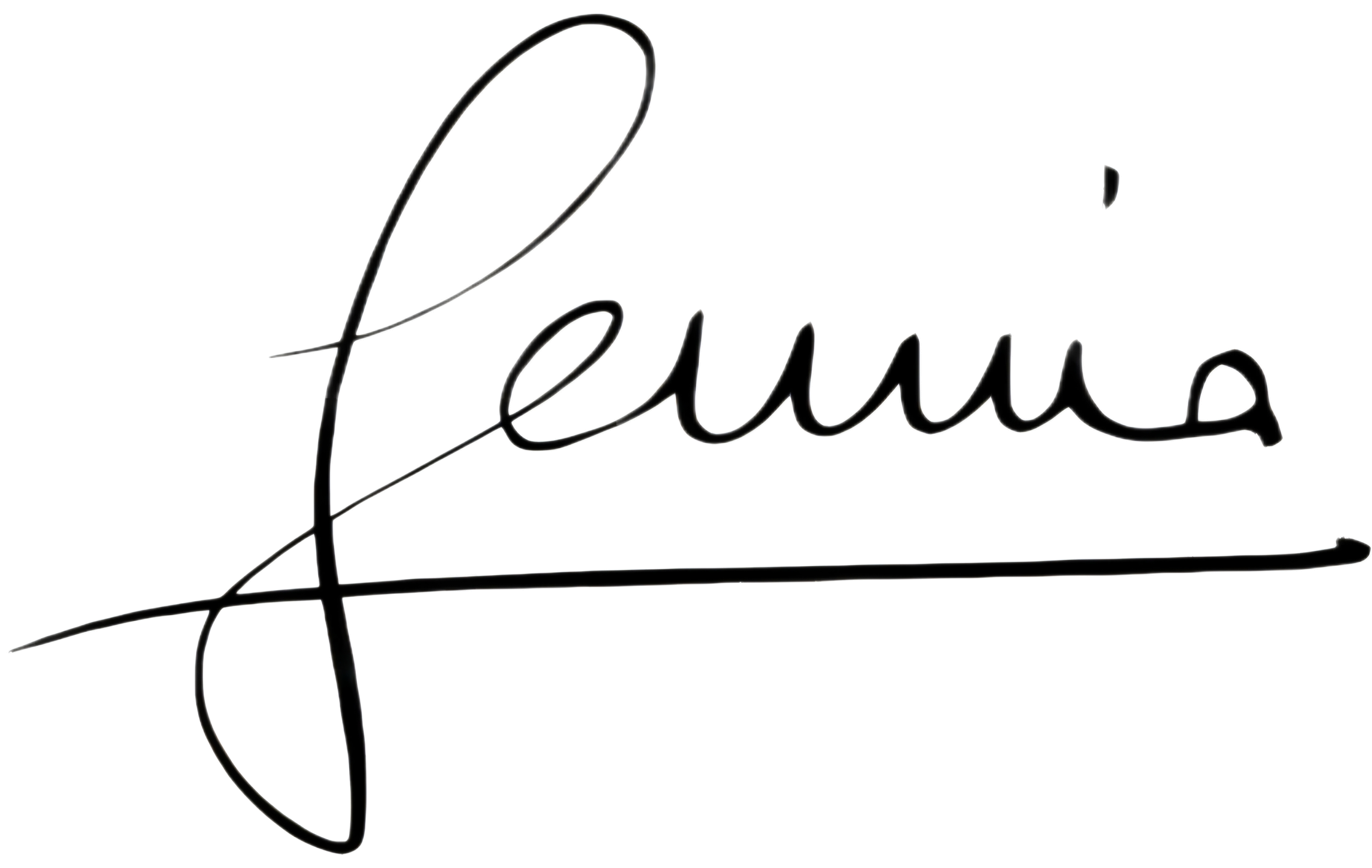

Augusto Genina (28 January 1892 – 18 September 1957) was an Italian film pioneer. A prolific movie producer and director, he released 88 films during his four-decade career. He worked extensively in Italy, Germany, and France, particularly during the late silent and early sound eras.

== Biography ==
=== Early life and career ===
Augusto Genina was born in Rome on 28 January 1892 into an upper-middle-class family. While studying engineering at the Sapienza University of Rome, he began working as a drama critic for the Roman magazine Il Mondo. He also started writing comedies and submitted them to his friend, the playwright Aldo De Benedetti. De Benedetti suggested that Genina offer his works to the film production company Cines as film scripts.

Genina took De Benedetti's advice and soon began working in the emerging Italian film industry. In 1912, he wrote the screenplay for the historical drama Beatrice d'Este, starring Francesca Bertini and produced by Film d'Arte, an Italian subsidiary of the French company Pathé. He then started working for Baldassarre Negroni, the artistic director of Celio Film, who became his mentor. Alberto Fassini, the director of Cines, took an interest in Genina's work and hired him as an assistant to Giulio Antamoro on Uomini e belve. Genina made his directorial debut in 1913 with La moglie di sua eccellenza. The film was shot at the Spanish branch of Cines, La Film de Arte Española, in Barcelona.

In 1914, Genina directed several films for Cines, mostly adventure movies or historical dramas, starring renowned actors such as Ruggero Ruggeri (Lulù), Leda Gys (Il piccolo cerinaio) and Pina Menichelli (Giovinezza trionfa!). Towards the end of the year, he accepted an offer from Milano Films, directed by Paolo Airoli, and moved to Milan. During his time there, he shot around ten films, most notably the drama La doppia ferita, starring the French actress and singer Mistinguett (born Jeanne-Marie Bourgeois). At the end of 1915 he returned to Rome.

During World War I and the period immediately afterwards, Genina continued to work for various Italian film companies in Rome and Turin. In 1916, he worked with Medusa Film in Rome, and the following year he directed three films for the Turinese company Ambrosio Film. Between 1917 and 1918, he directed four films for Itala Film. Following the establishment of the Unione Cinematografica Italiana in the early 1920s, he was appointed manager of the Turin-based production company Photodromo.

=== Germany and France ===
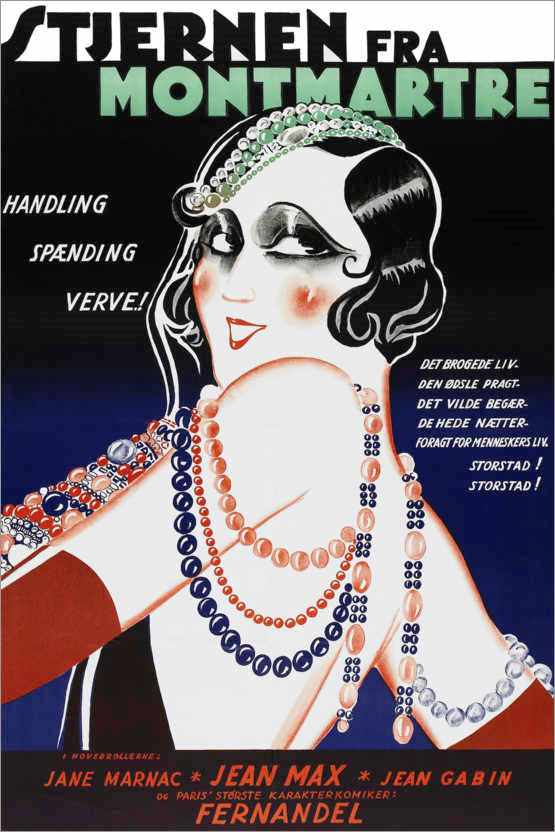
Advertising poster for Genina's The Darling of Paris (1931)

In 1918 Genina directed the successful comedy Addio, Giovinezza!, based on a play by Nino Oxilia. In 1923, he returned to the adventure genre of his early days and produced two successful films: Cyrano de Bergerac and Il corsaro. Italian cinema was experiencing a period of crisis. The Unione Cinematografica Italiana closed in 1923, and Italian production virtually came to a halt from 1924 to 1928. In an attempt to address this situation, Genina tried to sell his films abroad, where he was already well known. The silent drama The Hearth Turned Off, loosely based on a short story by Edmondo De Amicis, enjoyed particular success in Germany. In 1924, Genina directed in The Beautiful Wife, starring the young actress Carmen Boni. Genina and Boni married that same year and she became his muse, appearing in most of his films throughout the course of their marriage

Genina started a series featuring Boni in the lead role, which enjoyed success abroad during the final years of the silent era, primarily in Germany and France. The situation in Italy was so dire that Genina worked exclusively abroad for the next ten years. The last film he shot in Italy was a remake of Addio, Giovinezza!, also starring Boni, in 1927.

In Germany Genina directed several movies starring Boni in the lead role, most notably Sprung ins Glück (1928); Das Mädchen der Strasse (1928); Liebeskarneval (1928); and Quartier Latin (1929). In 1929 Genina moved to France. While there, he directed Louise Brooks in the early French talkie Miss Europe, which was her only French film. The story follows a young typist whose life is turned upside down after she wins a beauty contest, ultimately being murdered by her former boyfriend who she had left. The film was a success, followed by other hits including The Lovers of Midnight (1931), The Darling of Paris (1931) starring Jean Gabin and Fernandel, The Woman Dressed as a Man (1932) and We Are Not Children (1934) starring Gaby Morlay. in these years Genina also directed two German movies: Vergiss mein nicht! (1935), a musical starring Beniamino Gigli, and Blumen aus Nizza (1936).

=== Return to Italy ===
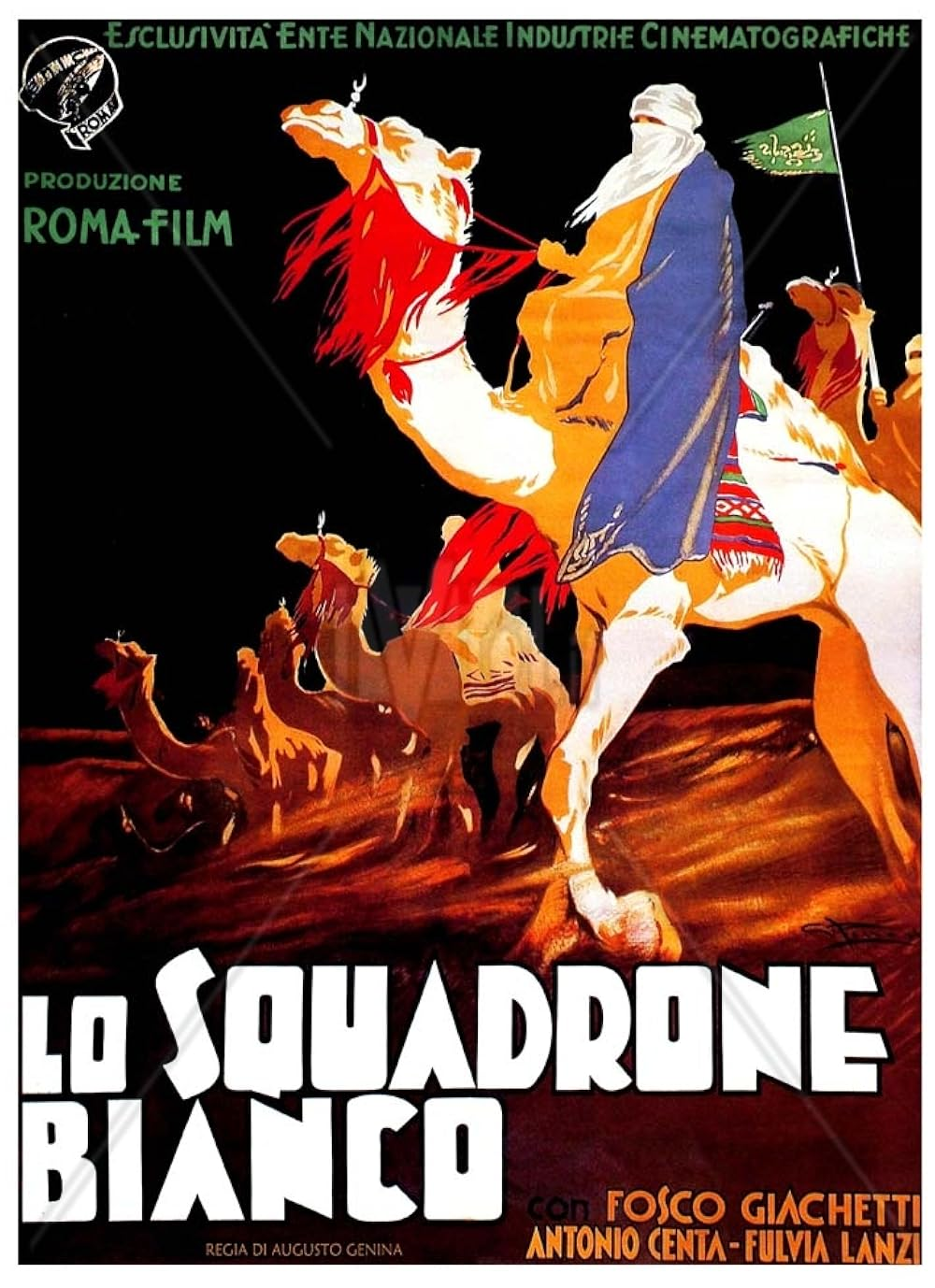
Advertising poster for Genina's Lo squadrone bianco (1936)

In 1935, Genina returned to Italy, where cinema was regaining its footing thanks yo the intervention of the Fascist government. Despite having worked almost exclusively abroad for the previous seven years, he had maintained his connections with the Italian film industry. In 1927, he was among the founding members of the Italian Directors' Association (ADIA). In 1936, Genina directed Lo squadrone bianco, which won the Mussolini Cup for Best Italian Film at that year's Venice Film Festival, marking his triumphant return to Italy.

In 1940, Genina directed The Siege of the Alcazar, which won the Biennale Cup Award at the Venice Film Festival that same year. Two years later, he directed Bengasi, which won the Mussolini Cup for Best Italian Film. Both films were highly accomplished, showcasing Genina's refined sense of visual construction, skilful screenwriting, and narrative pacing.

=== Last years ===
After the end of World War II, Genina did not make another film for several years. He returned to filmmaking in 1949 with the historical drama Heaven over the Marshes. Characterised by striking realism, the film was presented at the Venice Film Festival, where Genina won the International Award for Best Director and the Award of the Presidency of the Council of Ministers. Genina was also awarded the Nastro d'Argento for Best Director for the film.

In 1953, he filmed Three Forbidden Stories, another version of the real accident depicted by Giuseppe De Santis one year before in Rome 11:00 (Roma ore 11). Genina's last film, Frou Frou, a sentimental comedy set in the Belle Époque, was released in 1955. After that, the endocarditis that the director had been suffering from for some time worsened. He died in Rome on 28 September 1957.

== Selected filmography ==
=== Silent films ===
Year	Title	Preservation status
1913	La moglie di sua eccellenza	Lost
1914	Il segreto del castello di Monroe	Lost
1914	Il piccolo cerinaio	Cineteca Nazionale
1914	La parola che uccide	Lost
1914	La fuga dei diamanti	Cineteca Nazionale
1914	Dopo il veglione	Lost
1914	L'anello di Siva	Lost
1915	Lulu	Lost
1915	Gelosia	Public domain; National Museum of Cinema
1915	La farfalla dalle ali d'oro	Lost
1915	Mezzanotte	Lost
1915	Doppia ferita	Lost
1915	Cento H.P.	Lost
1915	La conquista dei diamanti	Lost
1915	L'ultimo travestimento	Lost
1916	Il sopravvissuto	Cineteca di Bologna
1916	Il sogno di un giorno	Lost
1916	La signorina Ciclone	Cineteca di Bologna and Archives françaises du film
1917	Il siluramento dell'Oceania	Centre national du cinéma et de l'image animée
1917	Maschiaccio	Lost
1917	Lucciola	Cineteca di Bologna and Lobster Films
1918	Il trono e la seggiola	Lost
1918	The Prince of the Impossible	Filmoteca de la UNAM
1918	Goodbye Youth	Public domain; Cineteca di Bologna, National Museum of Cinema and National Film Archive of Japan
1919	La maschera e il volto	Filmoteca de la UNAM
1925	The Beautiful Wife	Lost
1925	Cirano de Bergerac	Public domain
1925	The Hearth Turned Off	Lost
1926	The Last Lord	Lost
1927	The Prisoners of Shanghai	Lost
1927	Goodbye Youth	Cineteca di Bologna
1927	The White Slave	Lost
1928	Scampolo	Cineteca di Bologna and German Federal Archives
1928	The Story of a Little Parisian	Public domain
1928	Love's Masquerade	Lost
1929	Latin Quarter	Lost

Sound films

Year	Title	Notes
1930	Miss Europe	First sound film made by star Louise Brooks
1931	The Darling of Paris	
1931	The Lovers of Midnight	First sound film to be made at the Billancourt Studios in Paris
1931	La femme en homme	
1934	We Are Not Children	
1935	Forget Me Not	The rights to the film were bought by Alexander Korda who remade it in Britain the following year.
1936	The Phantom Gondola	
1936	Lo squadrone bianco	The film won the Mussolini Cup at the 4th Venice International Film Festival
1936	Flowers from Nice	
1937	The Kiss of Fire	
1937	Woman's Love—Woman's Suffering	
1939	Castles in the Air	A separate German-language version, Ins blaue Leben, was also released.
1939	The Siege of the Alcazar	The film won the Mussolini Cup in Venice Film Festival
1942	Bengasi	The film won the Mussolini Cup in Venice Film Festival
1949	Heaven over the Marshes	Included on the Italian Ministry of Cultural Heritage's 100 Italian films to be saved, a list of 100 films that "have changed the collective memory of the country between 1942 and 1978".
1950	Devotion	
1953	Three Forbidden Stories	
1953	Maddalena	
1953	Frou-Frou	Also known as A Girl from Paris.

== Bibliography ==
- Brunetta, Gian Piero (1991). Cent'anni di cinema italiano. Roma-Bari: Laterza. ISBN 978-8842038511.
- Moliterno, Gino (2009). The A to Z of Italian Cinema. Lanham, Maryland: Scarecrow Press. ISBN 978-0810870598.
