= Parola railway station =

Railway station in Hattula, Finland

Parola
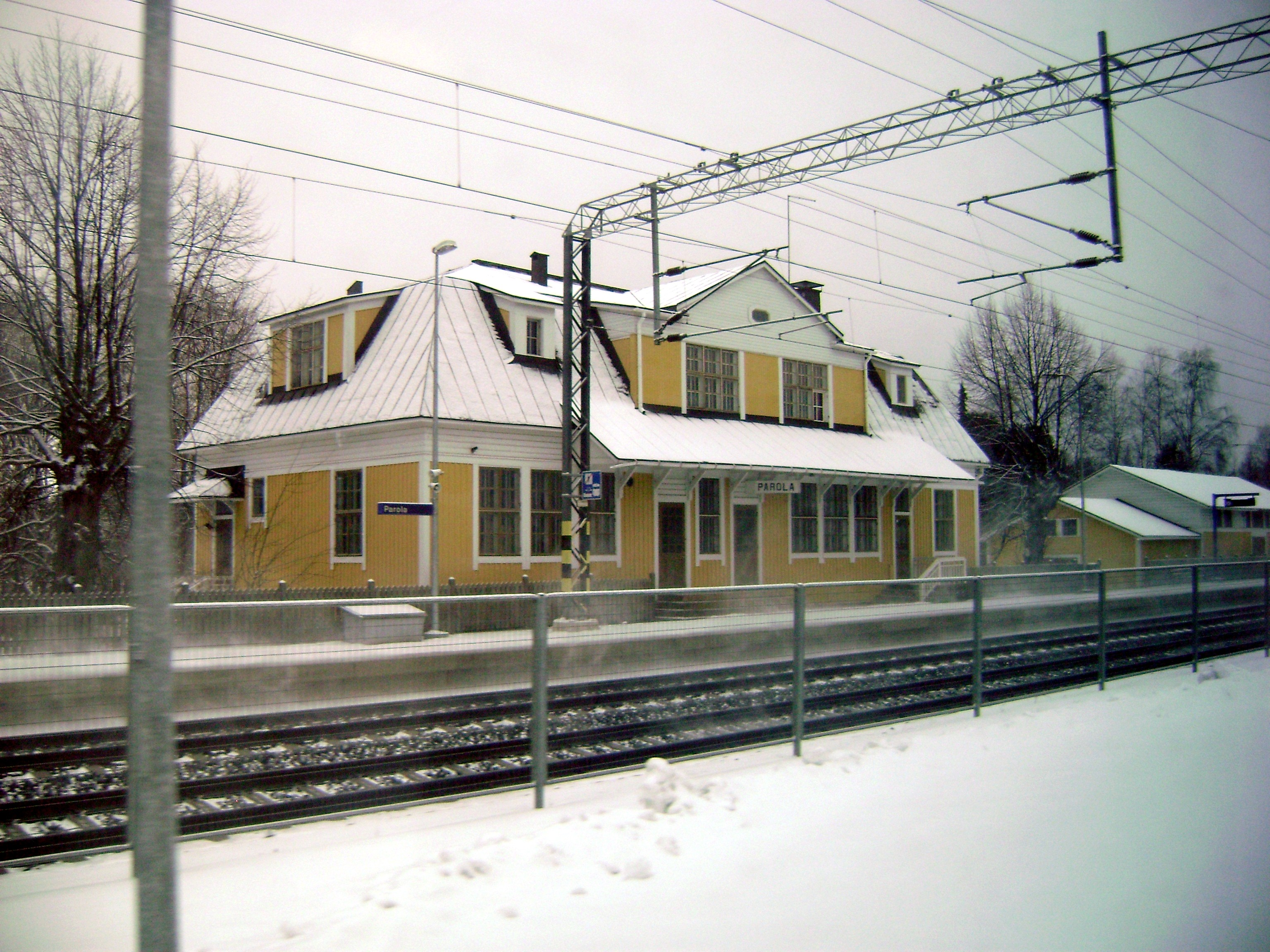

General information
- Location: Asemantie, 13720; Parola, Hattula; Finland
- Coordinates: 61°03′00″N 024°21′58″E
- System: VR station
- Owner: Finnish Transport Infrastructure Agency
- Operator: VR Group
- Line: Riihimäki–Tampere railway
- Platforms: 2 side platforms
- Tracks: 2 (with platforms); 3 (in total)

Construction
- Architect: Bruno Granholm
- Architectural style: Jugendstil

Other information
- Station code: Prl
- Classification: Operating point

History
- Opened: 22 June 1876; 150 years ago

Passengers
- 2008: 15,000

Services
Preceding station	VR commuter rail	Following station
Hämeenlinna towards Helsinki	R	Iittala towards Tampere
Location
- Location within Kanta-Häme Location within Finland

The Parola railway station (Finnish: Parolan rautatieasema, Swedish: Parola järnvägsstation) is located in the municipality of Hattula, Finland, in the urban area and municipal seat of Parola. It is located along the Riihimäki–Tampere railway, and its neighboring stations are Iittala in the north and Hämeenlinna in the south.

== History ==
Parola railway station was one of the original stations established on the railway between Hämeenlinna and Tampere opened in 1876 (as an expansion of the Helsinki–Hämeenlinna line opened in 1862). The original station building designed by architect Knut Nylander was completed in the same year as the railway was opened. The building was destroyed in a fire in 1918.

One significant reason to establish the Parola station was the range located in the nearby Parolannummi, which eventually became a permanent garrison after World War II. A railway track from Parola station southwest towards the range was also built, but was scrapped by the end of 1970's. Already before regular train traffic began on the railway, Russian Czar Alexander II travelled by train to Parola to visit the range at Parolannummi. An industrial track was later built from the station to northeast and is still in use.

The current Jugendstil (Art Nouveau) style station building, designed by architect Bruno Granholm, was completed in 1920, replacing the former one destroyed in a fire. Passenger traffic at the Parola station ceased in 1981, but was started anew already in 1985.

== Services and departure tracks ==
Parola is served by VR commuter rail line R on the route Helsinki–Riihimäki–Hämeenlinna–Tampere. Southbound trains toward Hämeenlinna, Riihimäki and Helsinki use track 1, while northbound trains toward Tampere use track 3. Track 2 has no platform and is only used by long-distance trains that pass through the station.
