= La doppia ferita =

1915 film by Augusto Genina

- Directed by: Augusto Genina
- Written by: Augusto Genina
- Cinematography: Carlo Montuori
- Release date: 4 June 1915
- Country: Italy
- Language: Silent

La doppia ferita is a 1915 Italian film directed by Augusto Genina. The story and script were also by Genina.
