= Dopo / Adesso =

Dopo/Adesso
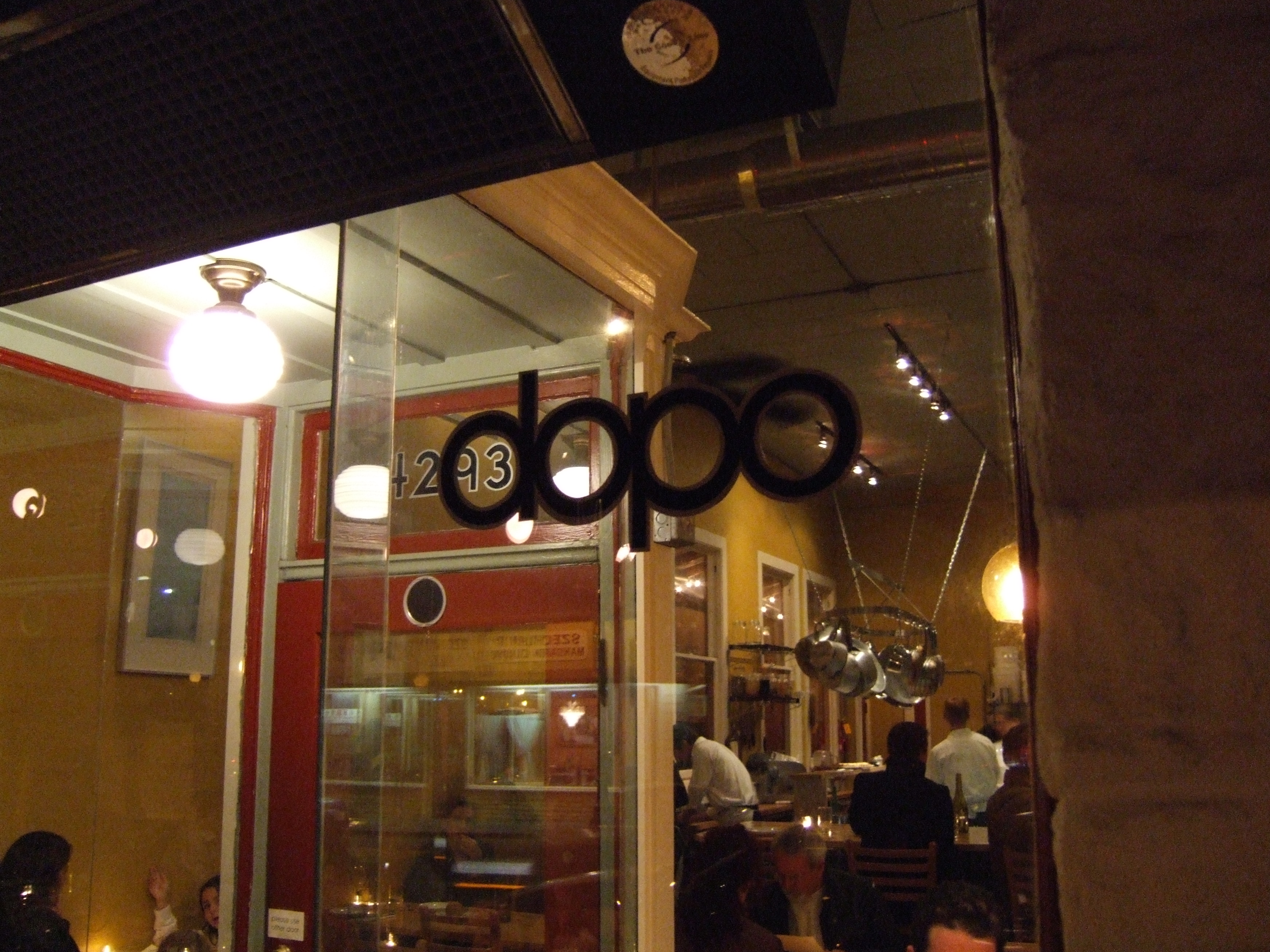
- Interactive map of Dopo/Adesso

Restaurant information
- Established: September 2003
- Head chef: Jon Smulewitz
- Chef: Chad Arnold (salumi chef)
- Food type: Italian, California cuisine
- Location: 4293 Piedmont Avenue (Dopo) and 4395 Piedmont Avenue (Adesso), Oakland, Alameda, California, 94611, United States
- Reservations: Yes
- Website: https://www.dopoadesso.com/

Dopo and Adesso were a pair of restaurants in Oakland, California founded and run by chef Jon Smulewitz. Dopo was founded in 2003 and Adesso was spun off in February 2009 when the owners acquired additional nearby space. Both restaurants focused on charcuterie, with menus changing on a daily basis to take advantage of timely ingredients. They have been described by the New York Times as part of a new wave of innovative restaurants that have begun to improve Oakland's reputation for food, and have won extensive local acclaim, with both Dopo and Adesso being listed by the San Francisco Chronicle as one of the top hundred restaurants in the Bay Area in 2012.

== Dopo ==
Dopo was the first of Smulewitz's restaurants, founded in September 2003. It served Northern Italian inspired cuisine, focusing primarily on charcuterie, pizza, and seafood and emphasizing dishes that are less well known. Its style has been influenced by the California cuisine of the nearby Chez Panisse, as well as the charcuterie of Oliveto, a nearby restaurant that was one of the first in the country to have an in-house charcuterie program. The restaurant made an active effort to use local and sustainable food where possible, with ingredients being purchased fresh from Monterey Market every day, or delivered by local farms.

Dopo has been rated among the top hundred restaurants in the Bay Area by the San Francisco Chronicle from 2007 to 2011.

Dopo closed on October 3, 2020.

== Adesso ==
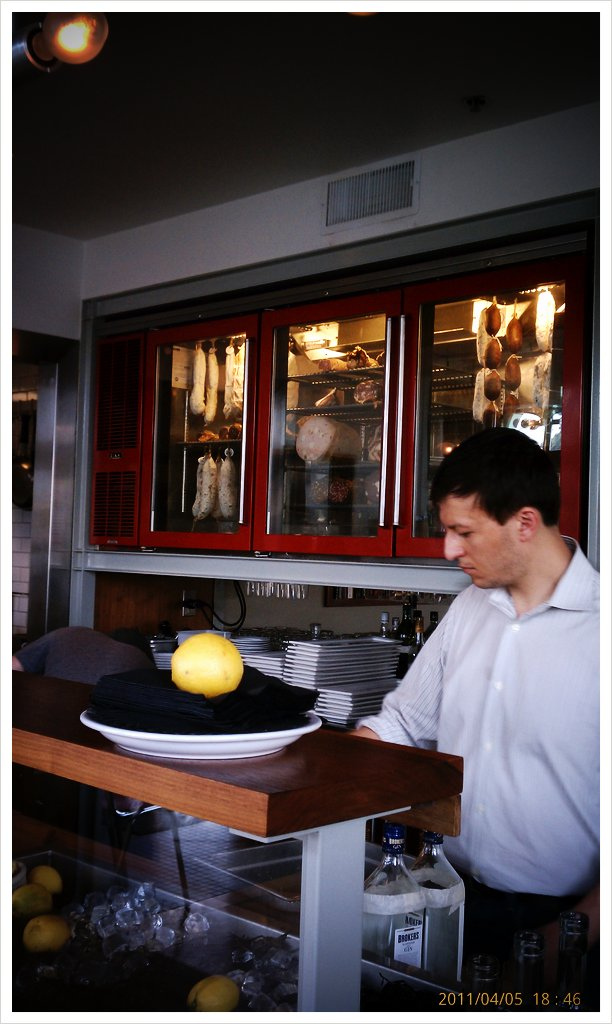
The interior of Adesso

Adesso was split off from Dopo in early 2009. Adesso's menu focused on salumi and Pâté, with a substantially larger array of charcuterie available than at Dopo. Adesso also had an extensive bar, with well-reviewed cocktails and a large number of Italian wines.

Adesso had been rated among the top hundred restaurants in the Bay Area by the San Francisco Chronicle in 2010 and 2011. Adesso received a Good Food Award in 2012 for their speck.

Adesso closed in 2017.

== Locations ==
Dopo
37°49′44″N 122°14′58″W
Adesso
37°49′49″N 122°14′51″W
