= L'anello di Siva =

- Directed by: Augusto Genina
- Release date: 1914
- Country: Italy
- Languages: Silent film Italian intertitles

L'anello di Siva is a 1914 Italian film directed by Augusto Genina.
