= Il sogno di un giorno =

- Directed by: Augusto Genina
- Release date: 1916
- Country: Italy
- Language: Silent

Il sogno di un giorno is a 1916 Italian film directed by Augusto Genina.
