= The Beautiful Wife =

1924 film directed by Augusto Genina

- Directed by: Augusto Genina
- Starring: Carmen Boni
- Production company: Genina Film
- Release date: December 1924
- Country: Italy
- Languages: Silent; Italian intertitles

The Beautiful Wife or Love's Sacrifice (Italian: La moglie bella) is a 1924 Italian silent film directed by Augusto Genina and starring Carmen Boni.

== Cast ==
- Linda Moglia
- Ruggero Ruggeri
- Luigi Serventi
- Carmen Boni
- Carlo Tedeschi

== Bibliography ==
- Stewart, John. Italian Film: A Who's Who. McFarland, 1994.
