= We Are Not Children =

1934 film directed by Augusto Genina

- Directed by: Augusto Genina
- Written by: Léopold Marchand (play)
- Produced by: Gaby Morlay
- Starring: Gaby Morlay; Claude Dauphin; Jean Wall
- Cinematography: Robert Lefebvre; Harry Stradling Sr.
- Music by: Marcel Lattès
- Production company: Euréka-Film
- Distributed by: SEDIF
- Release date: 25 January 1934
- Running time: 80 minutes
- Country: France
- Language: French

We Are Not Children (French: Nous ne sommes plus des enfants) is a 1934 French comedy film directed by Augusto Genina and starring Gaby Morlay, Claude Dauphin and Jean Wall.

== Cast ==
- Gaby Morlay as Roberte
- Claude Dauphin as Jean Servin
- Jean Wall as Roger, l'ami
- Pierre Larquey as M. Breton
- Léon Arvel
- Marcelle Monthil
- Pauline Carton
- Yvonne Drines
- Madeleine Guitty
- Lucienne Le Marchand
- Nina Myral
- Henry Houry

== Bibliography ==
- Frank Burke. A Companion to Italian Cinema. John Wiley & Sons, 2017.
