= La moglie di sua eccellenza =

- Directed by: Augusto Genina
- Release date: 1913
- Country: Italy
- Language: Silent

La moglie di sua eccellenza is a 1913 Italian film directed by Augusto Genina. The film was Genina's directorial debut and was filmed on location in Barcelona.

A contemporary review praised the quality of the acting, the beauty of the images and the premise.
