= La farfalla dalle ali d'oro =

- Directed by: Augusto Genina
- Release date: 1915
- Country: Italy
- Language: Silent

La farfalla dalle ali d'oro is a 1915 Italian film directed by Augusto Genina.
