= La conquista dei diamanti =

- Directed by: Augusto Genina
- Release date: 1915
- Country: Italy
- Language: Silent

La conquista dei diamanti is a 1915 Italian film directed by Augusto Genina, the sequel to his earlier film, La fuga dei diamanti of 1914.

== Bibliography ==
- Aldo Bernardini, 2015: Le imprese di produzione del cinema muto italiano, Bologna: Persiani ISBN 9788898874231
- Sergio G. Germani, Vittorio Martinelli, 1989: Il cinema di Augusto Genina. Pordenone: Biblioteca dell'Immagine
- Vittorio Martinelli, 1993: Il cinema muto italiano, I film degli anni d'oro. 1915, Torino ERI, Roma, C.S.C. ISBN 8839708219
