= Cento H.P. =

1915 Italian silent film

- Directed by: Augusto Genina
- Release date: 1915
- Country: Italy
- Language: Silent

Cento H.P. is a 1915 Italian film directed by Augusto Genina.
