= Il piccolo cerinaio =

- Directed by: Augusto Genina
- Release date: 1914
- Country: Italy
- Language: Silent

Il piccolo cerinaio (English: The Little Match-seller) is a 1914 Italian film directed by Augusto Genina.
