= La fuga dei diamanti =

- Directed by: Augusto Genina
- Release date: 1914
- Country: Italy
- Language: Silent

La fuga dei diamanti is a 1914 Italian film directed by Augusto Genina. It was followed in 1915 by the sequel La conquista dei diamanti.

== Sources ==
- Roberto Poppi, 2002: I Registi, p. 200. Editore Gremese: Roma ISBN 8884401712 (online version)
