= Resurrection (1944 film) =

- Directed by: Flavio Calzavara
- Written by: Leo Tolstoy (novel); Corrado Alvaro; Gian Paolo Callegari; Italo Cremona; Tomaso Smith; Flavio Calzavara
- Produced by: Mario Borghi
- Starring: Doris Duranti; Claudio Gora; Germana Paolieri; Wanda Capodaglio
- Cinematography: Gábor Pogány
- Edited by: Ignazio Ferronetti
- Music by: Franco Casavola
- Production company: Scalera Film
- Distributed by: Scalera Film
- Release date: 8 May 1944
- Running time: 90 minutes
- Country: Italy
- Language: Italian

Resurrection (Italian: Resurrezione) is a 1944 Italian drama film directed by Flavio Calzavara and starring Doris Duranti, Claudio Gora and Germana Paolieri. It is an adaptation of the 1899 work Resurrection, the final novel by the Russian writer Leo Tolstoy. It was one of a significant number of Italian films based on works of Russian literature made during the era. It was made at the Scalera Studios in Rome.

== Cast ==
- Doris Duranti as Caterina Màslova
- Claudio Gora as Dimitri Neklindoff
- Germana Paolieri as Alessandra
- Wanda Capodaglio as Zia Sofia
- Guido Notari as Scembok
- Egisto Olivieri as Il commissario
- Gemma Bolognesi as Matriona
- Tilde Teldi as Maria Ivanovna
- Doris Hild as Missy
- Oreste Fares as Il vecchio domestico di Dimitri
- Emilio Petacci as Un carceriere
- Tina Lattanzi as La principessa Korciaghin
- Augusto Di Giovanni as Il mercante Smielkoff
- Joop van Hulzen as Il compagno di scherma di Dimitri

== Bibliography ==
- Testa, Carlo. Italian Cinema and Modern European Literatures, 1945-2000. Greenwood Publishing Group, 2002.
