= Parola (Hattula) =

Urban area in Hattula, Finland

Coordinates: 61.05°N 24.3667°E

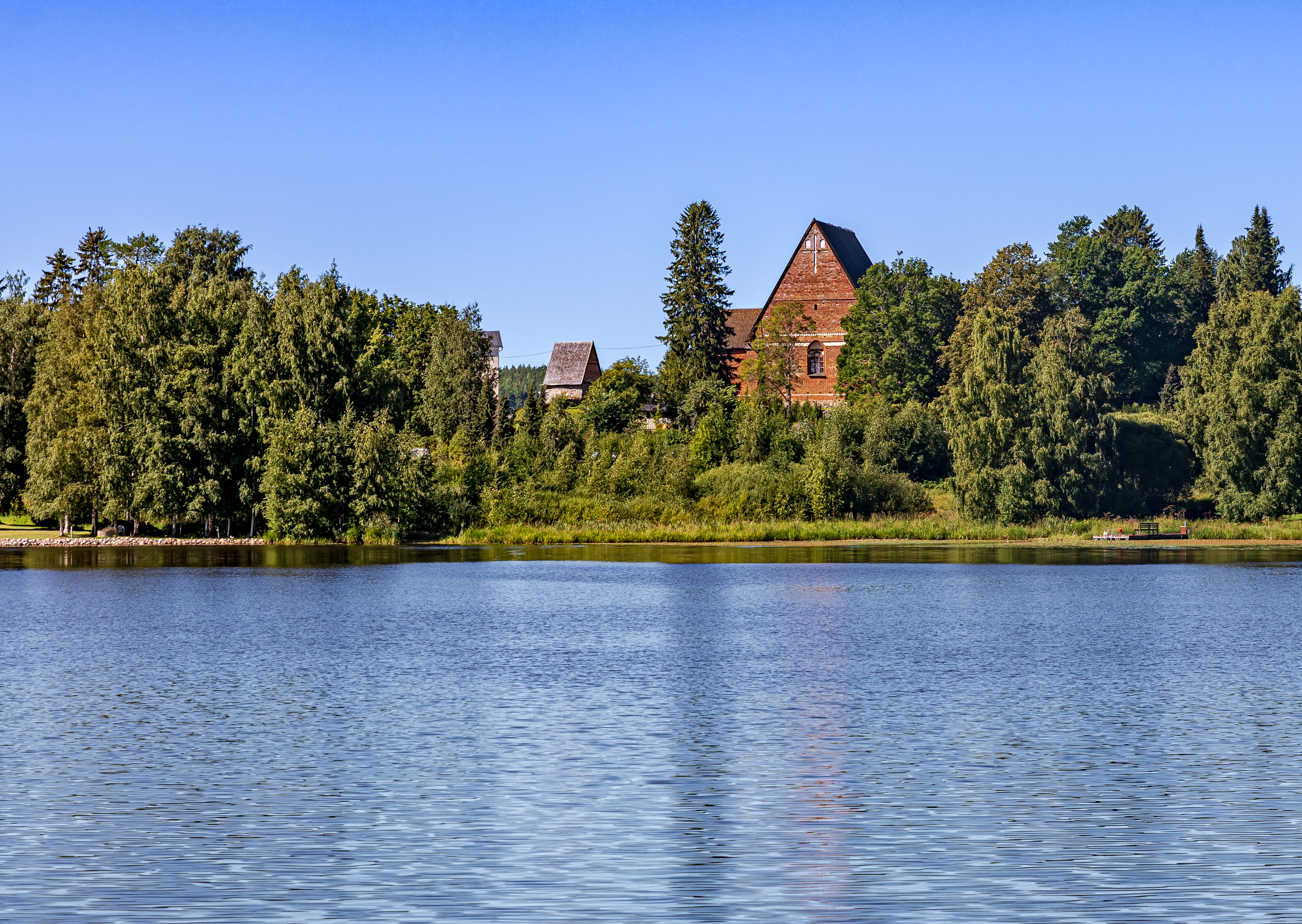
Hattula Holy Cross Church next to Lake Vanajavesi.

Parola is an urban area located in the municipality of Hattula in the Kanta-Häme region of Finland. It is notable for its rich history that intertwines ancient settlement, medieval culture, and significant military heritage. Parola has a population of 6,678 as of 2022 and it is the centre of Hattula.

== Medieval period ==
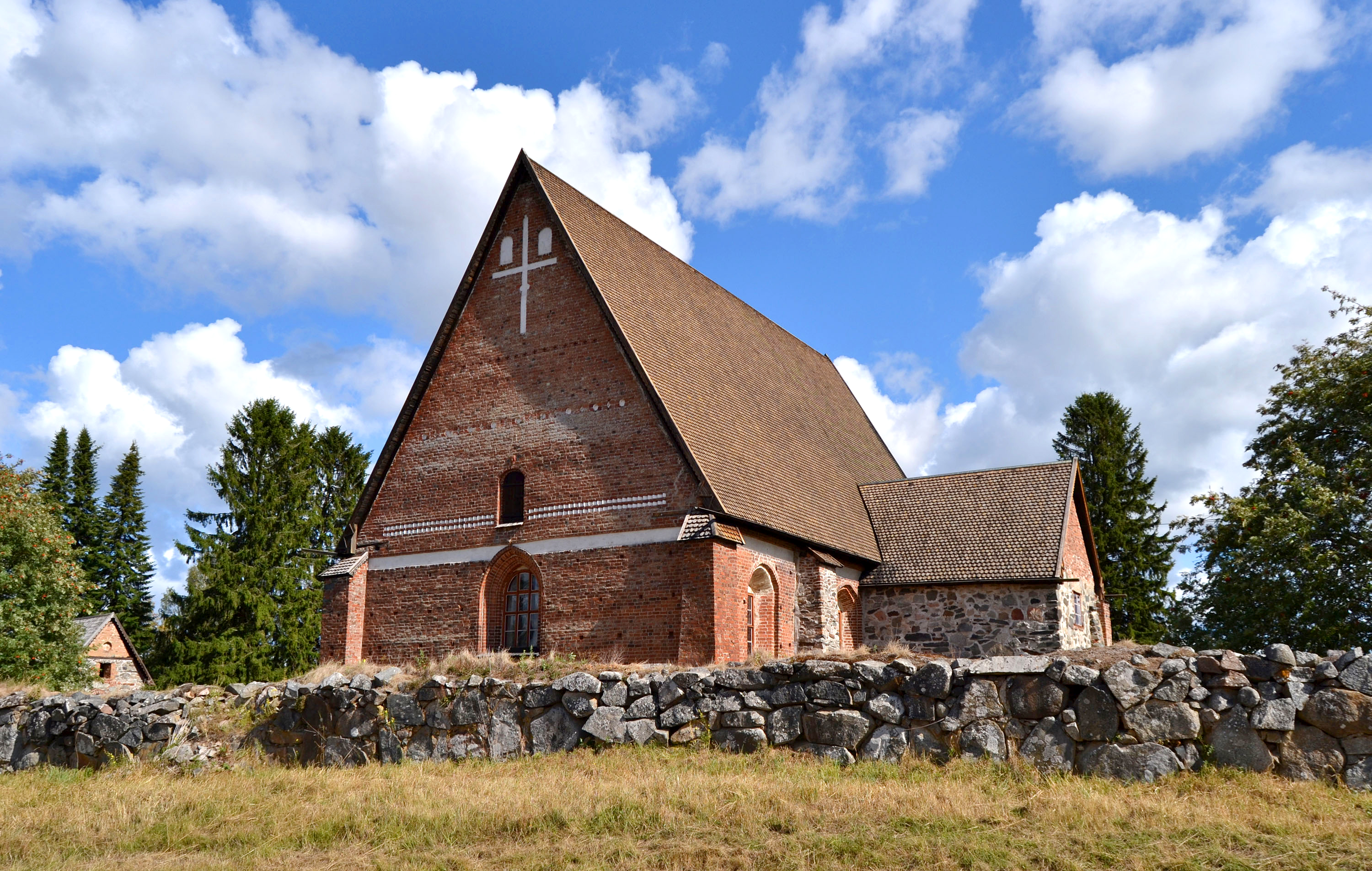
Hattula Holy Cross Church.

Hattula, including Parola, was part of the historic Häme region from the late 13th century under Swedish rule. The medieval heritage of Hattula is anchored by the Holy Cross Church (Pyhän Ristin kirkko), built primarily of brick in Gothic style between the late 1400s and early 1500s. This church served as an important pilgrimage site during the Middle Ages, attracting visitors for its medieval frescoes and rich religious significance. The Church of the Holy Cross in Hattula became the easternmost pilgrimage site of the Catholic Church in Northern Europe. The Church of the Holy Cross in Hattula became even more popular when author Anneli Kanto wrote the book The Saint of the Rats, which tells the story of the nuns who painted the church's frescoes.

== Military ==
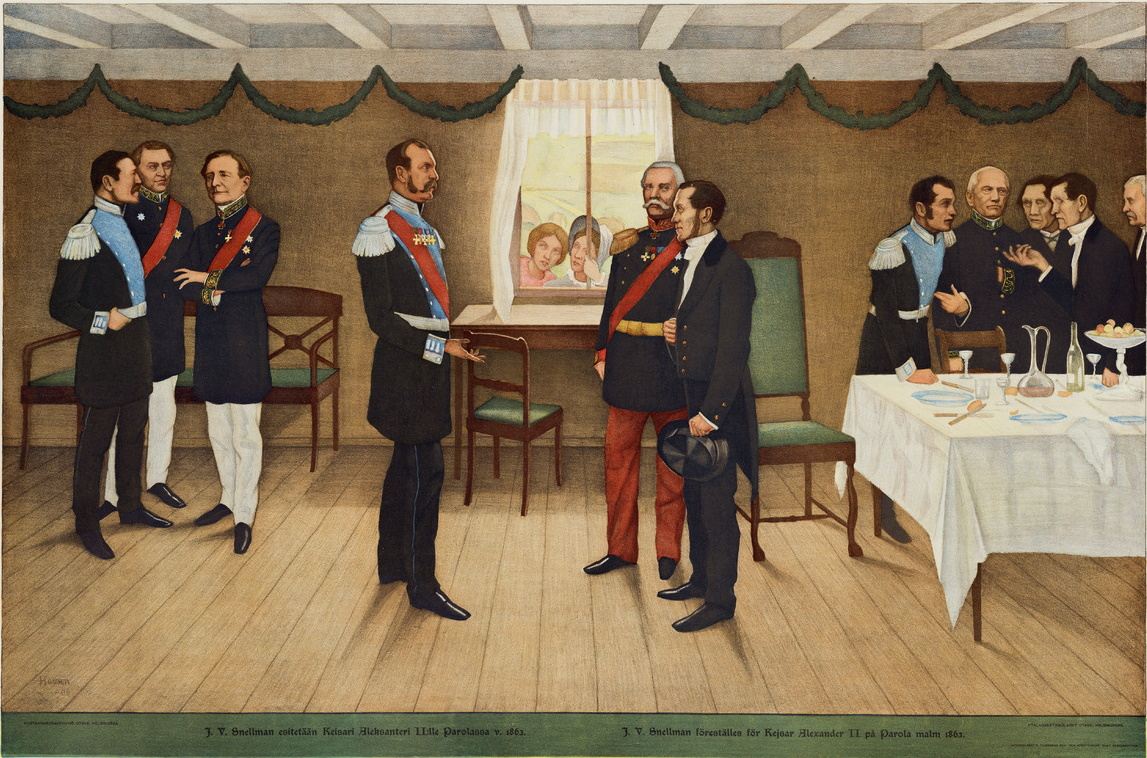
Grand Duke of Finland, Alexander II, met Senator Johan Vilhelm Snellman at Parolannummi in 1863.

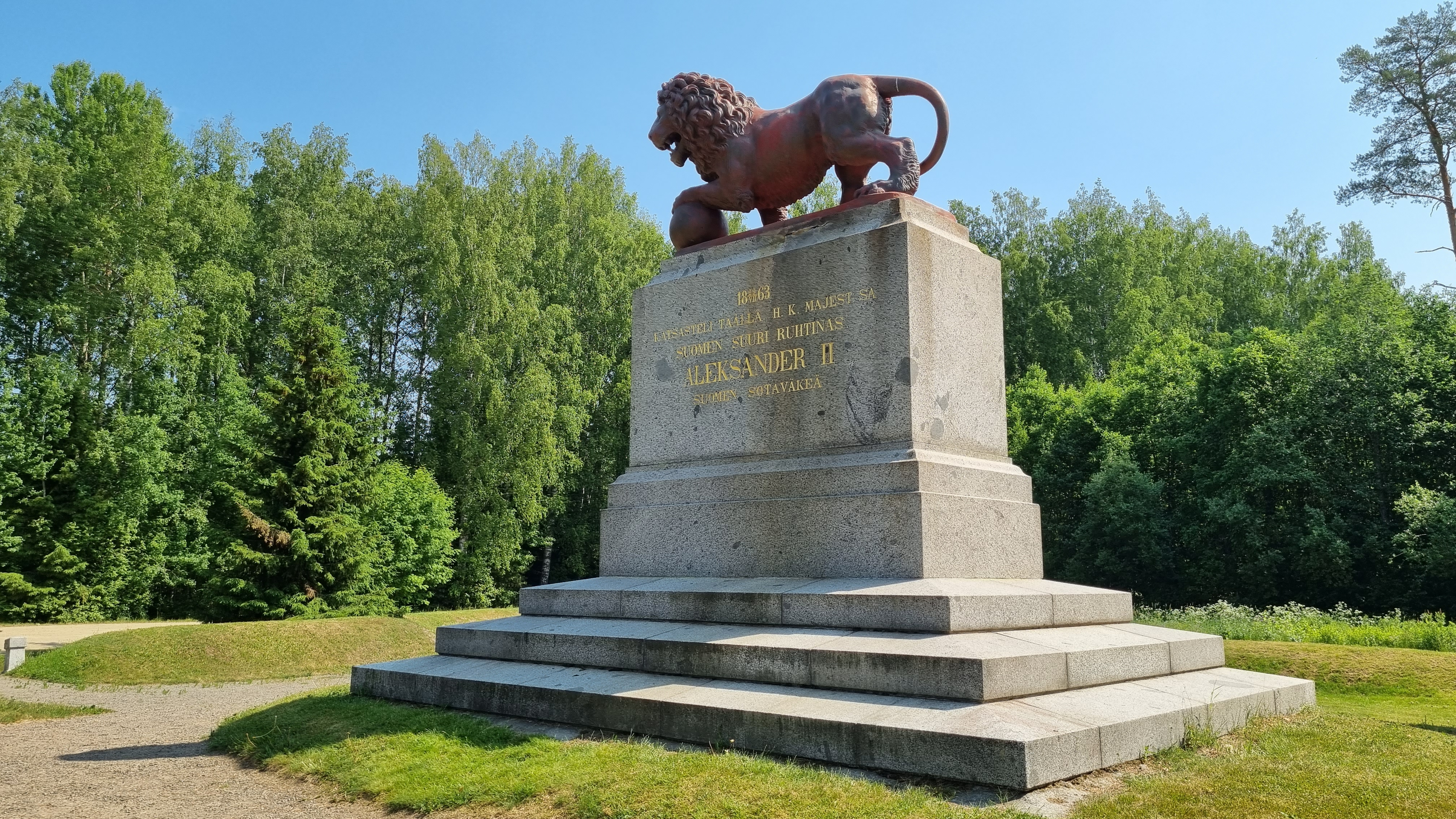
Lion of Parola statue.

Parola's military history is a defining aspect of its identity. Parolannummi in Parola has been used as a military training ground since 1777, but its military tradition dates to the 17th century when infantry and cavalry troops were assembled during the Thirty Years' War. Swedish Kings Gustav III and Gustav IV Adolf observed military exercises at Parolannummi. After the transfer of Finland to the Russian Empire in 1809 after the Finnish War, Russian Emperors Alexander I and Alexander II also visited the area.

In 1863 Emperor Alexander II met with Senator Johan Vilhelm Snellman at Parolannummi. This meeting led to the decree that elevated the Finnish language to equal status with Swedish in the Grand Duchy of Finland. To commemorate this, a bronze statue called the "Lion of Parola," created by Swedish sculptor Andreas Fornander, was erected in 1868.

== Transportation ==
After Russiais defeat in the Crimean War, Emperor Alexander II ordered the construction of Finland's first railway line in 1862, running between Helsinki and Hämeenlinna. The choice of destination was deliberate, as Hämeenlinna served as an important garrison town, and the railway made it possible to move troops swiftly to defend the Grand Duchy's capital at Helsinki. The extension from Hämeenlinna to Tampere was completed in 1876, at which time the Parola railway station was also opened.

== Modern era ==
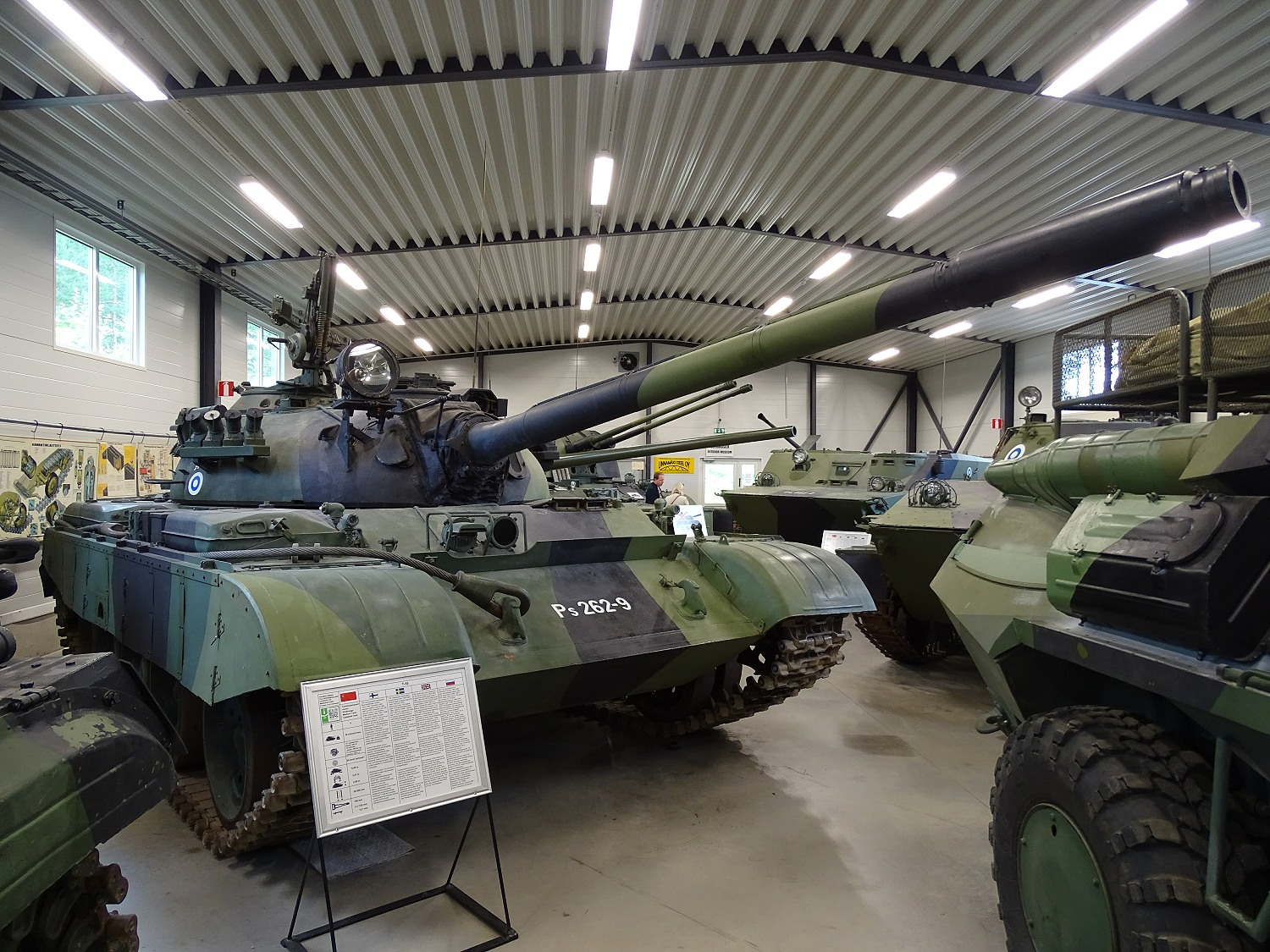
Armour Museum in Parola.

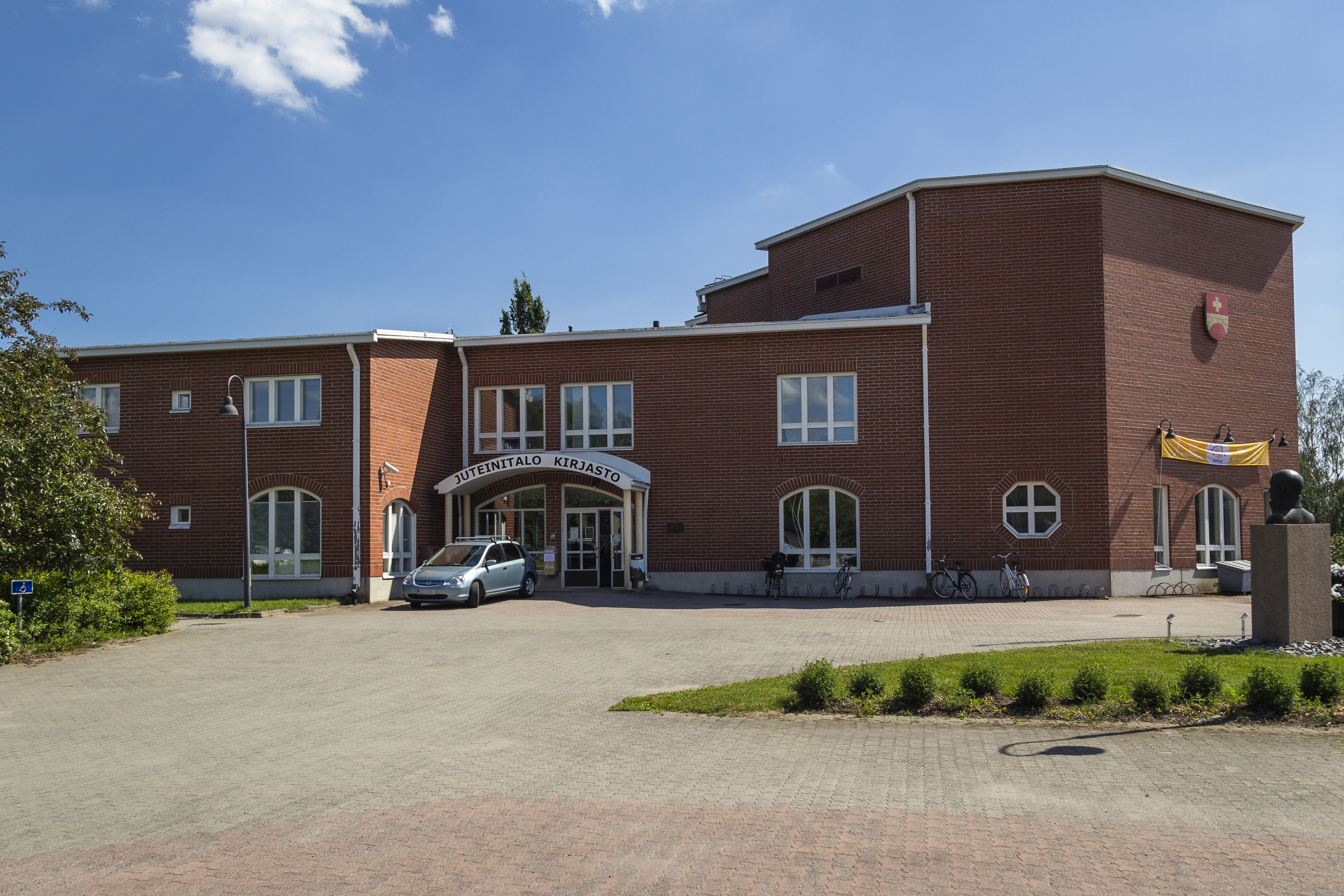
Hattula Library in Parola.

Today, Parola hosts the Finnish Defence Forces' Armour Brigade and the Parola Armour Museum. The museum, established in 1961, showcases a large collection of armored vehicles and honors the history of Finnish armored and anti-tank troops. The Parola Armour Museum has a wide selection of American, German, French, Russian, and British tanks. The "Lion of Parola" is featured also on the flag of the Finnish Army's Armour School.

== In popular culture ==
The film The Unknown Soldier, produced by Suomen Filmiteollisuus and directed by Edvin Laine, was partly shot in Parola. Prime Minister Urho Kekkonen granted permission for the use of a tank, which the production team obtained in Parola. The scenes in which Urho Hietanen destroys a tank, as well as the scene of Vilho Koskela's death, were filmed there.

== See also ==
- Parola Tank Museum
- Hattula Holy Cross Church
- Lake Vanajavesi
- Hämeenlinna
