= Lulu (1914 film) =

- Directed by: Augusto Genina
- Release date: 1914
- Country: Italy
- Language: Silent

Lulu is a 1914 Italian film directed by Augusto Genina.

IMDb summaries the story as, "A dancer lives by being held as the lover on duty, until a young man falls in love with her. His life is made up of lies and he will pretend to be waiting for a child to get married, to transform comedy into drama."
