= Dopo il veglione =

- Directed by: Augusto Genina
- Release date: 20 November 1914
- Country: Italy
- Language: Silent

Dopo il veglione is a 1914 Italian film directed by Augusto Genina.
