= Monterey Market =

Monterey Market is an independent produce and grocery store in Berkeley, California. They maintain an extensive produce section, sourcing from local providers. The store is frequented by many of the local restaurants, such as Paul Bertolli's Oliveto, for their selection of hard to find heirloom and specialty fruits, vegetables and fungi. The store was begun in 1961 by Tom and Mary Fujimoto.

== Sourcing Practices ==
Monterey Market has become known for its distinctive approach to sourcing produce, centered on direct relationships with small-scale and regional growers, rather than relying on large-scale distributors typical of conventional grocery chains. From early on, the market has established collaborative partnerships with local farmers, foragers, and producers, often purchasing entire harvests or specialty items directly from growers.

The collaborative sourcing works in mentorship-driven model, with market buyers guiding and working with growers to introduce new or unusual crops to local consumers. Farmers who start out selling at local farmers’ markets are often encouraged and assisted by Monterey Market staff to navigate retail logistics and quality requirements, which helps these producers expand their distribution.
