= Hämeenlinna railway station =

Railway station in Hämeenlinna, Finland

Hämeenlinna Tavastehus
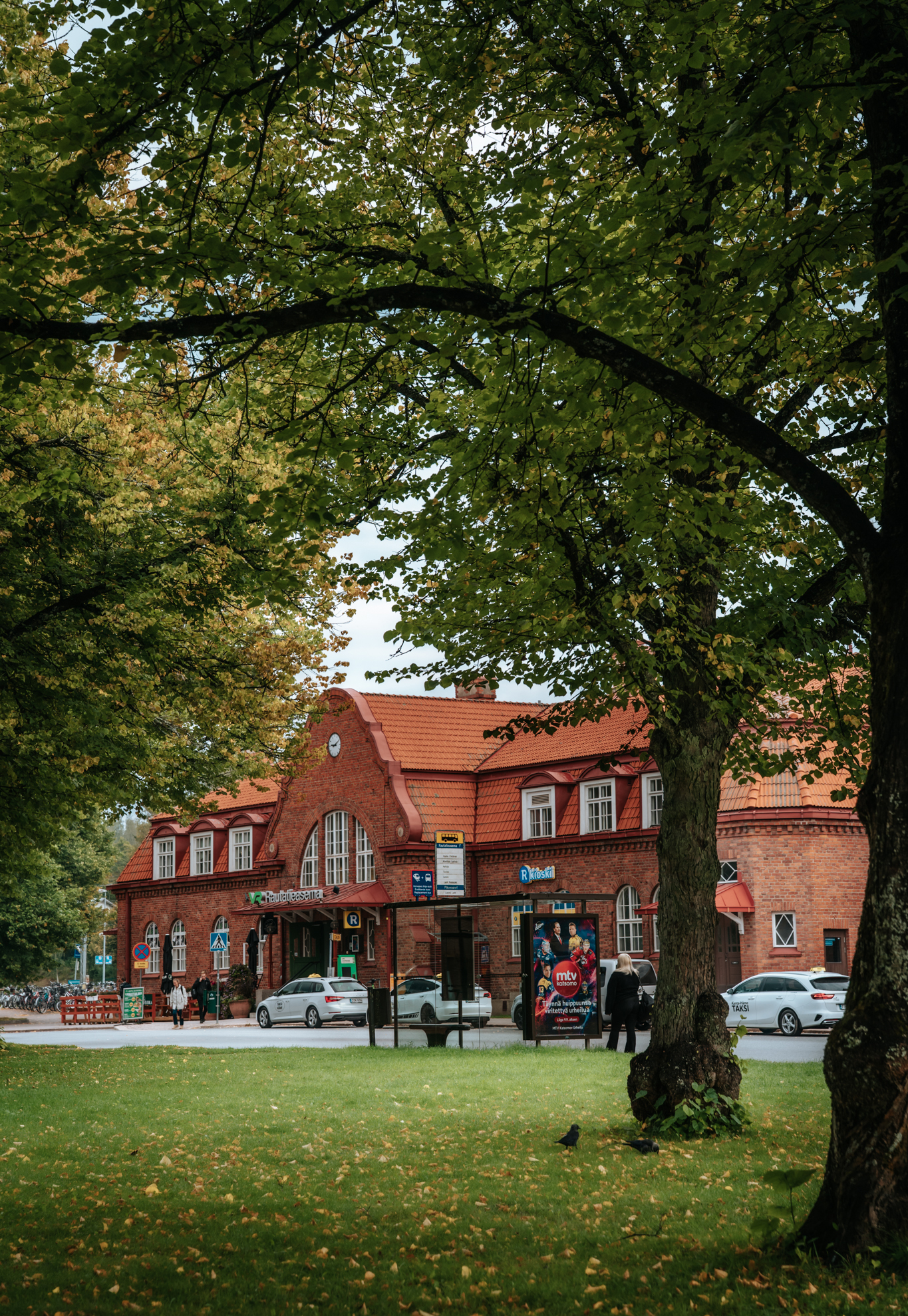
- Hämeenlinna station

General information
- Location: Hämeentie 16, 13200; Hämeenlinna; Finland
- Coordinates: 61°00′08″N 24°28′42″E
- System: VR station
- Owner: Finnish Transport Infrastructure Agency
- Operator: VR Group
- Line: Riihimäki–Tampere railway
- Platforms: 3
- Tracks: 7

Construction
- Architect: Thure Hellström
- Architectural style: Jugendstil

Other information
- Station code: Hl
- Classification: Operating point

History
- Opened: 1862; 164 years ago

Passengers
- 2008: 999,000

Services
Preceding station	VR commuter rail	Following station
Turenki towards Helsinki	R	Parola towards Tampere
Turenki towards Helsinki	D	Terminus
Preceding station	VR Group	Following station
Riihimäki Terminus	Riihimäki–Tampere	Toijala towards Tampere
Riihimäki towards Helsinki	Helsinki–Kolari (overnight service)	Toijala towards Kolari
Riihimäki towards Helsinki	Helsinki–Kemijärvi (overnight service)	Toijala towards Kemijärvi
Location
- Location within Kanta-Häme Location within Finland

Hämeenlinna railway station (Finnish: Hämeenlinnan rautatieasema, Swedish: Tavastehus järnvägsstation) is located in the town of Hämeenlinna, Finland.

Hämeenlinna is located about halfway between Helsinki and Tampere, and because of this, the station has much pass-through traffic, even though the Hämeenlinna station is not a crossing-point station. The station is served by all passing commuter trains and several passing InterCity and Pendolino trains. The Hämeenlinna station also has an underpass tunnel. The station building has a restaurant.

The Finnish Heritage Agency has classified Hämeenlinna railway station as a nationally significant built cultural environment.

== History ==
Hämeenlinna railway station was the original terminus of the Finnish Main Line opened in 1862, being one of the oldest railway stations in Finland. The station soon became a significant centre point of traffic due to the water transport connections from the northern parts of the region to Hämeenlinna via the Lake Vanajavesi, as the canals built in Valkeakoski, Lempäälä and Kaivanto were completed in the early 1870s. As the railway line was further expanded northwards to Tampere, the status of Hämeenlinna station as a traffic centre decreased significantly.

The original station building designed by architect Carl Albert Edelfelt was completed in the same year, but was destroyed during the Finnish Civil War in 1918.

The current station building designed by architect Thure Hellström was completed in 1921. Stylewise the building represents Jugendstil (Art Nouveau), with some features of Renaissance and Baroque-influenced Classicism. The northern end of the station was badly damaged in a fire on January 22, 1984.

A new railyard for freight trains was built at the eastern side of the station in 1996. The passenger train railyard was renewed in the late 1990s complete with a new underpass tunnel completed in 1999.

== Departure tracks ==
There are seven tracks at Hämeenlinna railway station, three of which have a platform for passenger trains.

- Track 1 is used by southbound long-distance trains as well as commuter trains D and R to Riihimäki/Helsinki.
- Track 2 is used by southbound night train services from Lapland to Helsinki.
- Track 3 is used by northbound long-distance trains as well as R trains to Tampere.

== Gallery ==
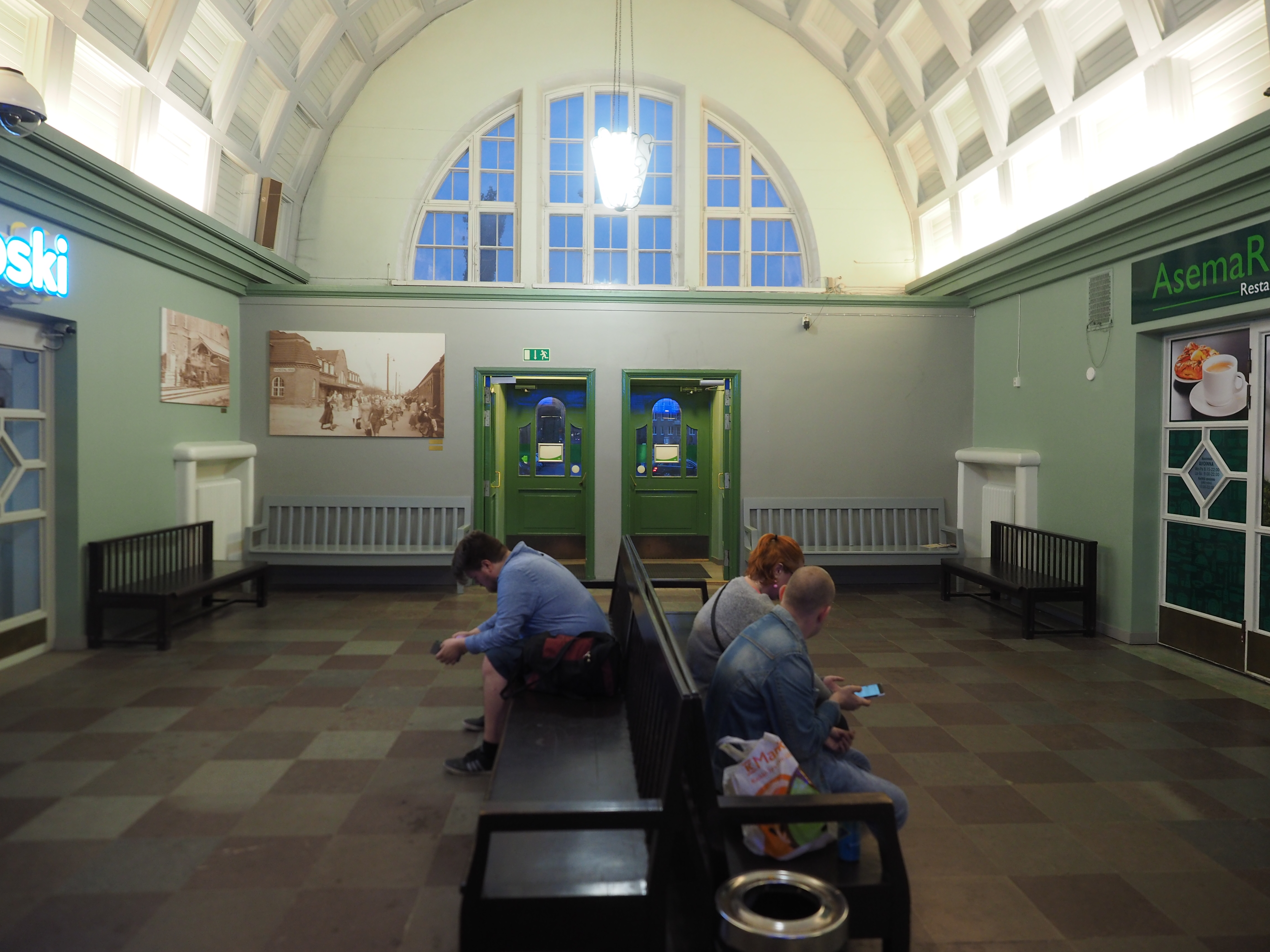
Interior of the Hämeenlinna railway station.

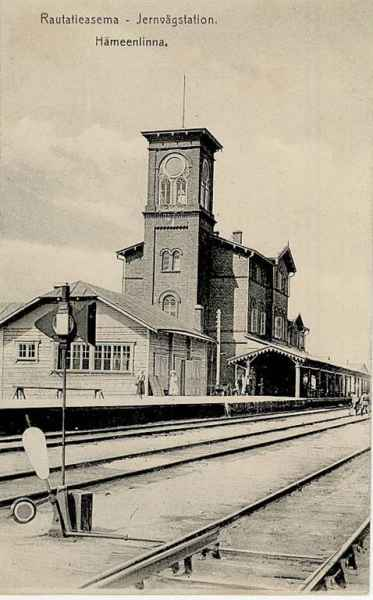
The old station building at Hämeenlinna was built in 1862.

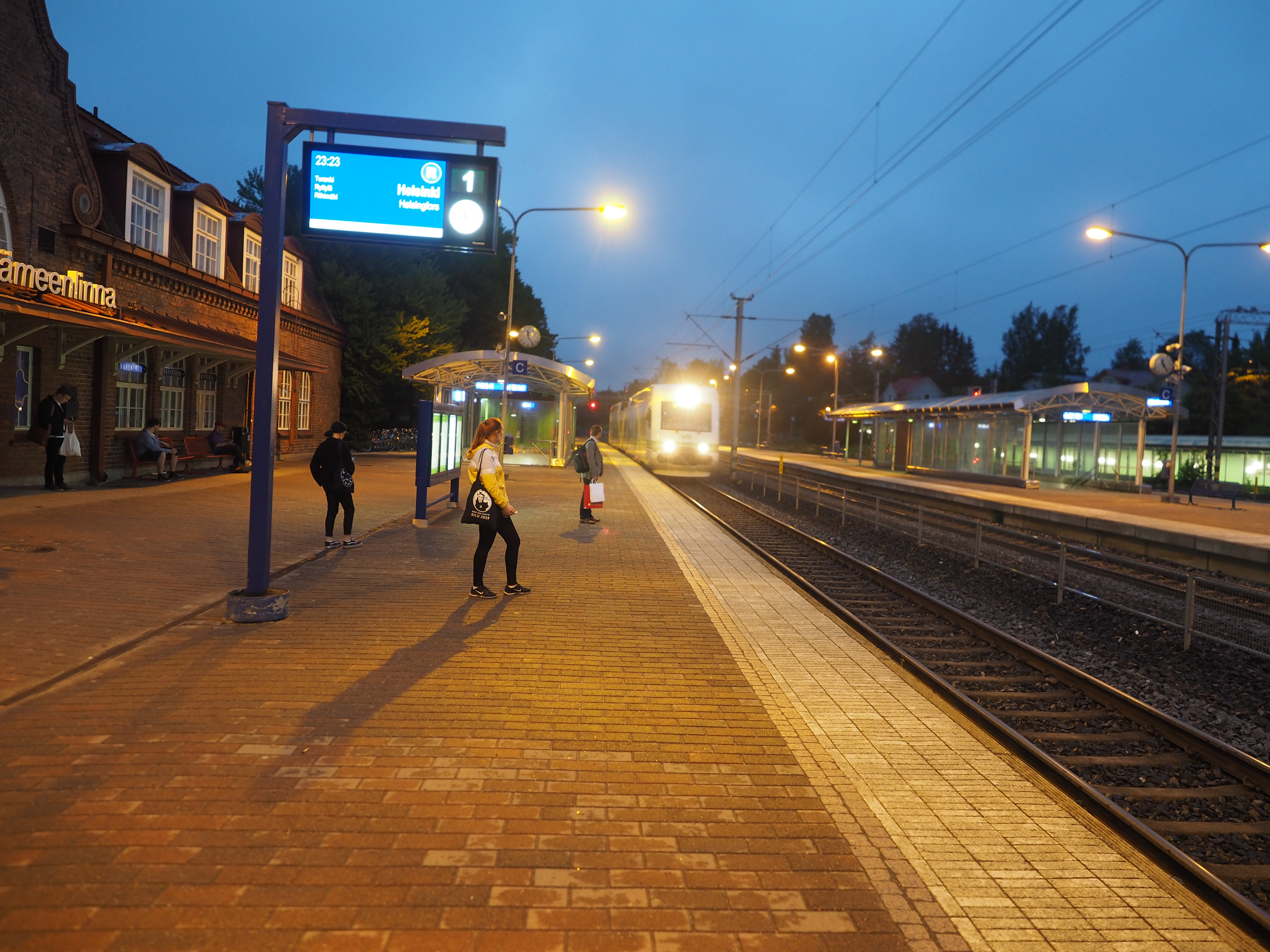
View of the tracks at night time, with a train arriving at the station.

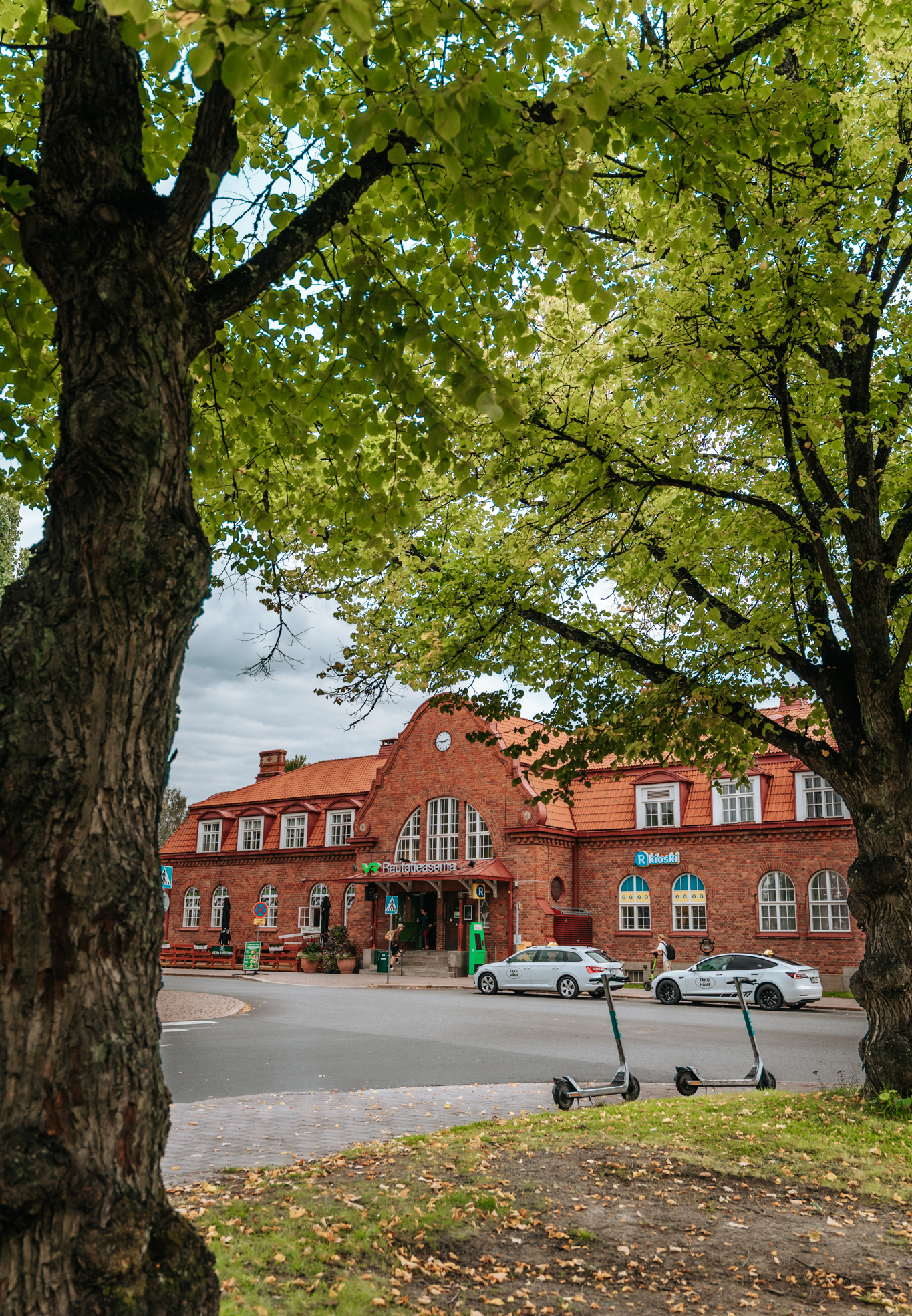
Hämeenlinnan Train station

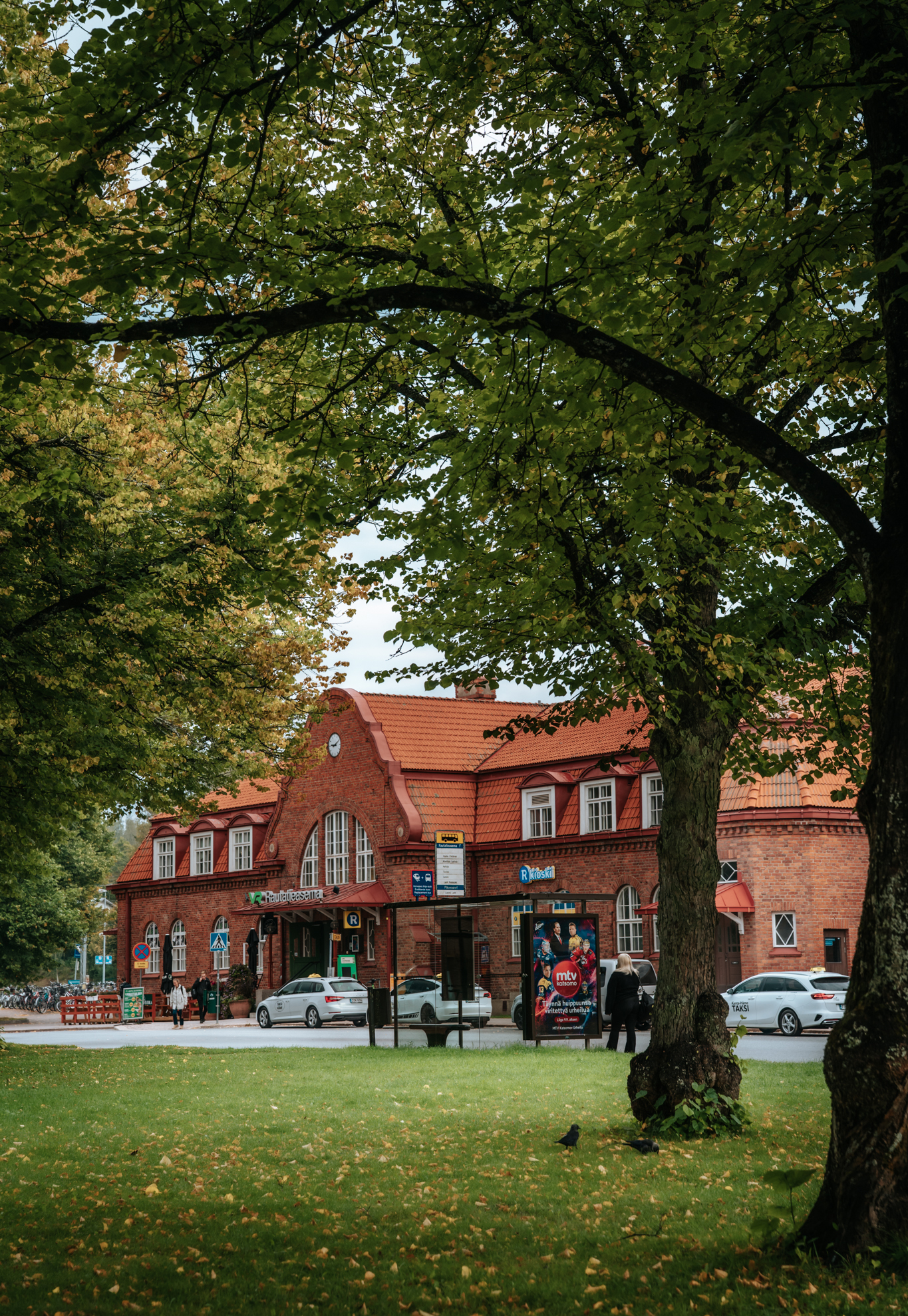
Hämeenlinnan Train station

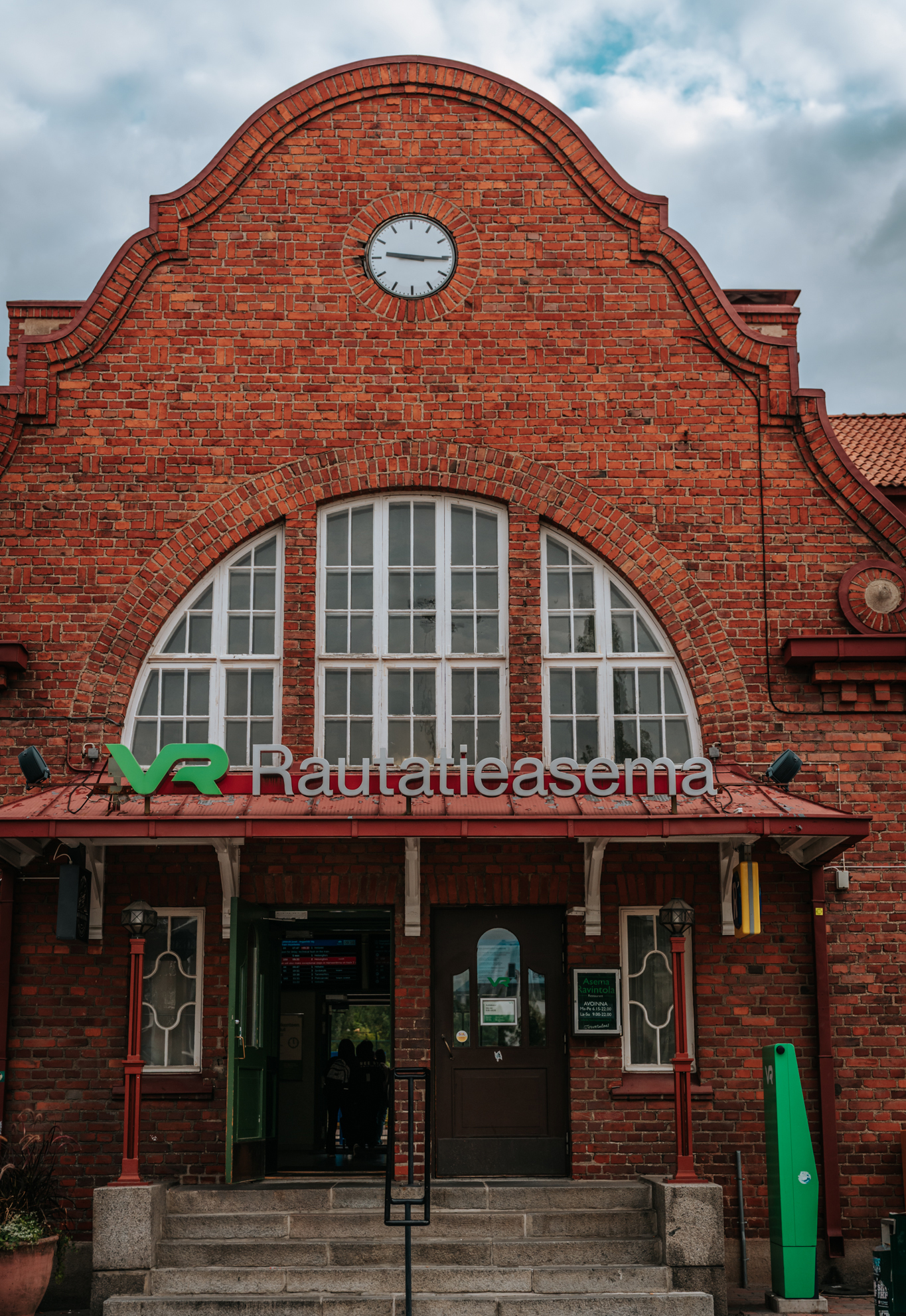
Hämeenlinnan Train station

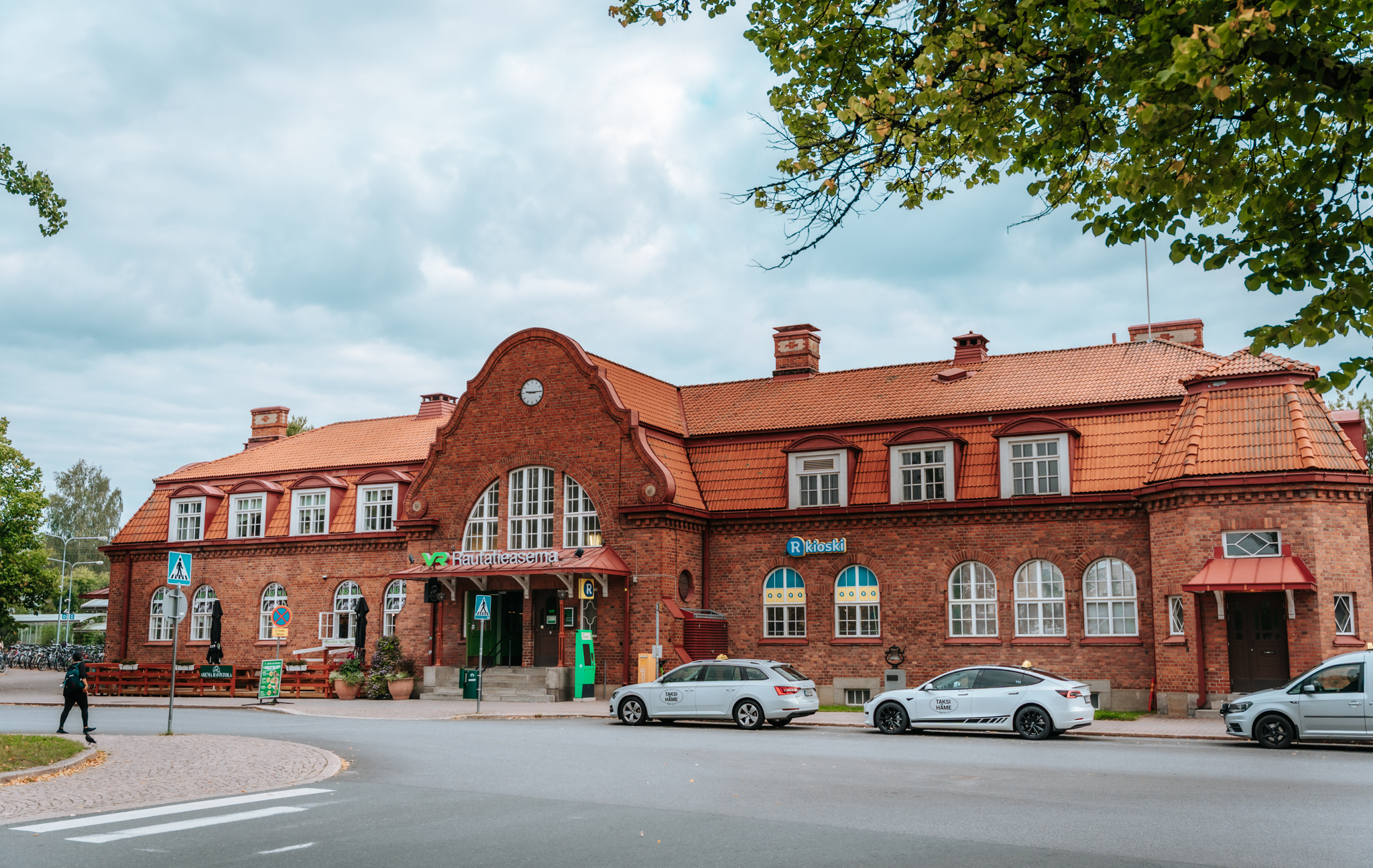
Hämeenlinnan Train station

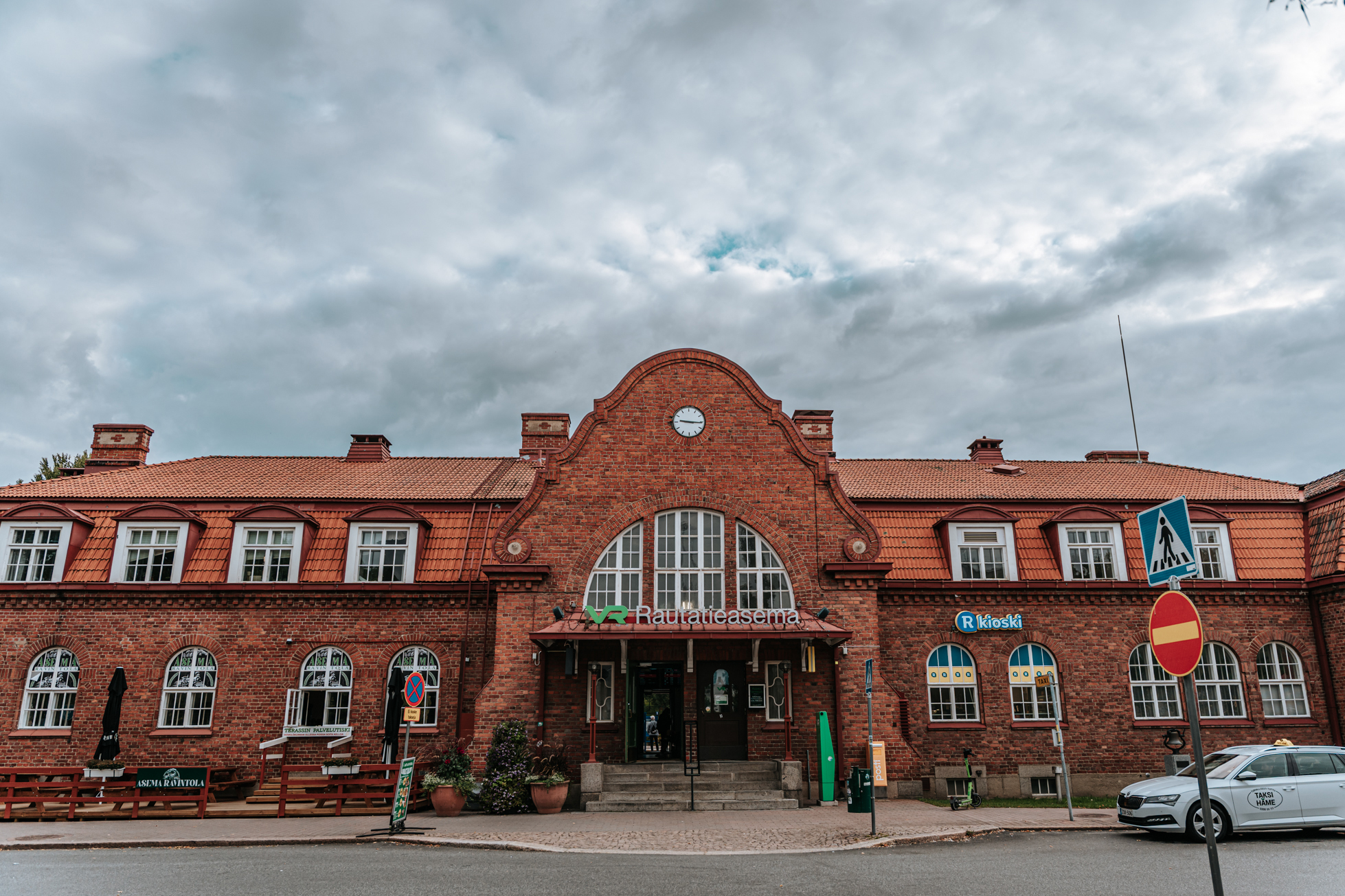
Hämeenlinnan Train station
