= Gelosia (1915 film) =

- Directed by: Augusto Genina
- Release date: 1915
- Country: Italy
- Language: Silent

Gelosia is a 1915 Italian film directed by Augusto Genina. It is a black-and-white silent film, and is 25 minutes long.
