= Milano Films =

Italian film production company

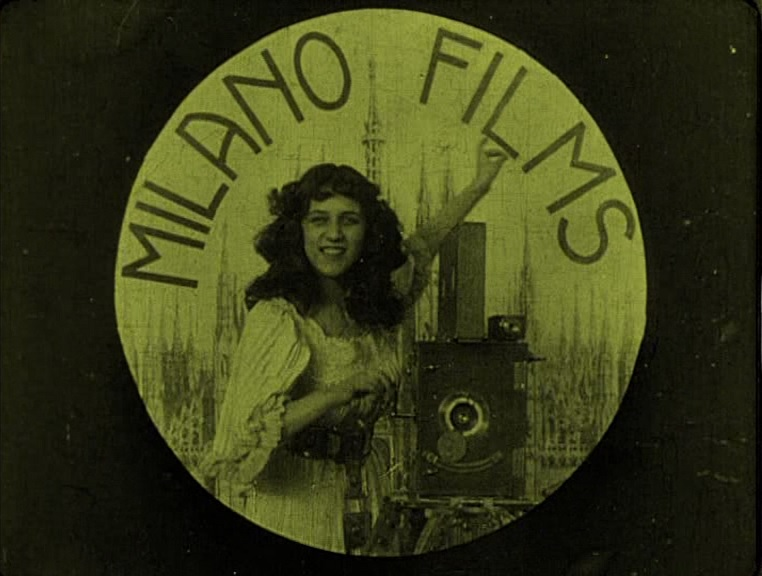
Company logo

Milano Films was an Italian film production company of the silent era. Founded in Milan in 1908, it was one of the leading Italian film companies of the 1910s, employing directors such as Baldassarre Negroni and Augusto Genina and actors including Lina Millefleurs, Mercedes Brignone and Pina Menichelli.

Milano was unusual in refusing to join the conglomerate Unione Cinematografica Italiana in 1919. It continued its own production programme until the late 1920s, but slowly declined in importance. By the time the company closed, the Italian film industry was in a general crisis.

In 1909 the company constructed the Bovisa Studios, at the time amongst the best in Europe. The studios continued to be used sporadically by other companies after Milano's demise, although filmmaking was increasingly centralised in Rome.

== Bibliography ==
- Moliterno, Gino (2009). Historical Dictionary of Italian Cinema. Scarecrow Press. ISBN 9780810868960 – via Google Books.
