= Kalvola =

Former municipality of Finland

Coordinates: 61°05′30″N 24°08′05″E

Location of Kalvola in Finland

Kalvola is a former municipality of Finland. Its seat was in Iittala. It was consolidated with Hämeenlinna on January 1, 2009.

It is located in the province of Southern Finland and is part of the Kanta-Häme region. The municipality had a population of 3,449 (2003) and covered an area of 338.81 km^{2} of which 38.75 km^{2} is water. The population density was 10.2 inhabitants per km^{2}. Kalvola is best known for its Iittala glass factory.

The municipality was unilingually Finnish.

A central element of the landscape in Kalvola is lake Vanajavesi near which many of the oldest settlements in the area are concentrated.

NHLer Hannu Toivonen was born here.

Former coat of arms of Kalvola (1952–2008)

The motif of the municipal coat of arms refers to the log carving and the old village of Orjanhirsi. The axe is also the symbol of the medieval patron saint of the parish, Saint Olaf. The coat of arms was designed by Olof Eriksson, and the Kalvola Municipal Council approved it at its meeting on September 29, 1952. The Ministry of the Interior confirmed the coat of arms for use on December 12, 1952.

== See also ==
- Iittala railway station
