= Ruggero Ruggeri =

Italian stage and film actor

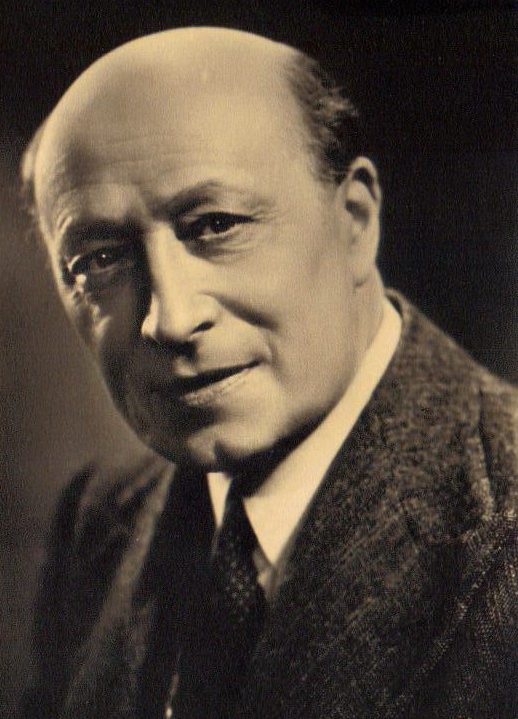
- Born: 14 November 1871; Fano, Marche; Italy
- Died: 20 July 1953 (aged 81); Milan, Lombardy; Italy
- Occupation: Actor
- Years active: 1914–1953 (film)

Ruggero Ruggeri (14 November 1871 – 20 July 1953) was an Italian stage and film actor. Ruggeri was a celebrated theatre actor, appearing alongside Lyda Borelli on stage in 1909. From 1914 onward he sporadically made films in both the silent and sound eras.

== Filmography ==
Year	Title	Role	Notes
1915	Il sottomarino n. 27		
1917	Hamlet	Hamlet	
1919	The Prince of the Impossible	Principe Venceslao D'Avrezac	
1924	The Beautiful Wife	Francesco Marini	
1925	La via del peccato		
1925	L'uomo più allegro di Vienna	Max Bluck	
1931	Queen of the Night	Jean Derville	
1934	Quella vecchia canaglia	Guglielmo Vautier	
1939	The Widow	Alessandro	
1939	Le père Lebonnard	Le père Antonio Lebonnard	
1939	The Document	Leandro, il maggiordomo	
1940	Una lampada alla finestra	Andrea Viardo	
1940	La gerla di papà Martin	Papà Martin	
1941	Se non son matti non li vogliamo	Momi Tamberlan	
1941	The Betrothed	Il cardinale Federigo Borromeo	
1942	Fourth Page	L'impiegato di baco ladro	
1942	Jealousy	Il parocco don Silvio	
1943	Sant'Elena, piccola isola	Napoleone Bonaparte	
1947	Vanity	Sacerdote	
1951	The Temptress	Presidente tribunale	
1952	The Little World of Don Camillo	Crocefisso	Narrator, Uncredited
1953	The Return of Don Camillo	Jesus	Narrator, Uncredited

== Bibliography ==
- Dalle Vacche, Angela. Diva: Defiance and Passion in Early Italian Cinema. University of Texas Press, 2008.
