= Mustankallio water tower =

Water tower in Finland

Coordinates: 60°59′32.5″N 25°40′17.8″E

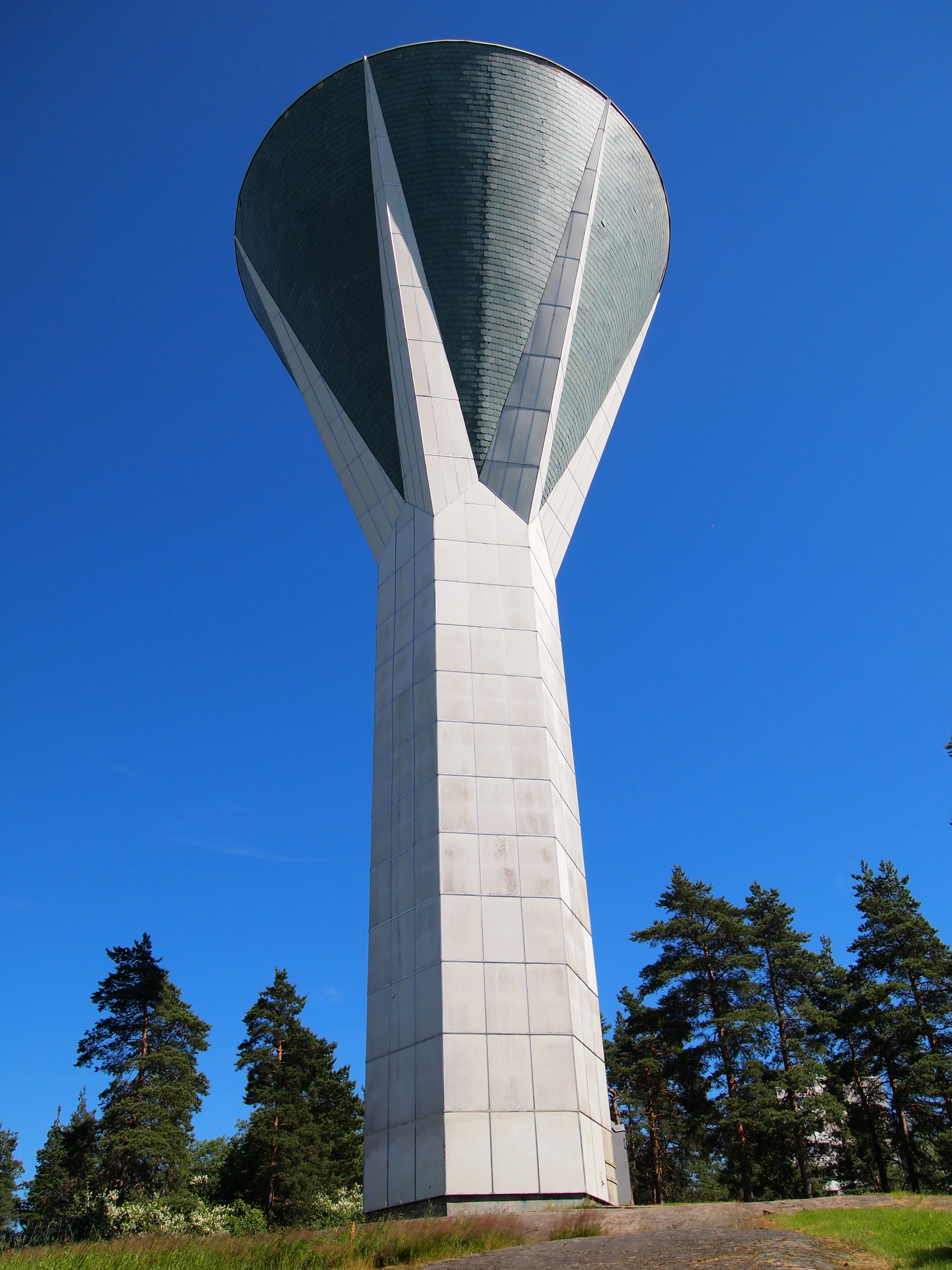
View from the south

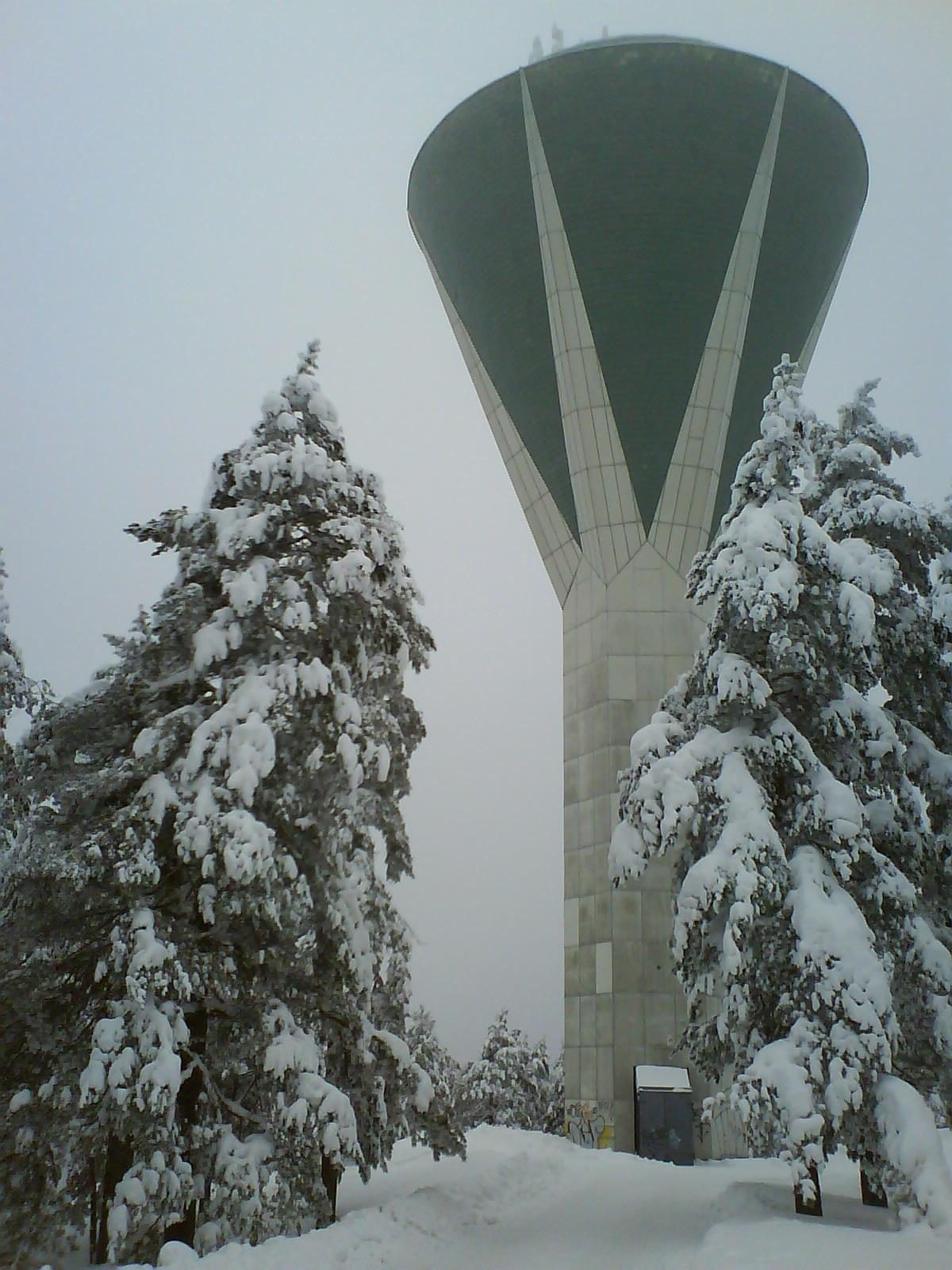
View from the southeast, in snow

Mustankallio water tower lies in the Kiveriö district of Lahti, Finland, and stands 50 metres (160 ft) tall. Completed by a local company in 1963, it includes two water reservoirs, a penthouse meeting facility complete with sauna, and a viewing platform. The design, which features pre-stressed concrete elements and asbestos cement cladding, was a departure from the steel water tower structures commonly built in the region. When commissioned, its original name was the Metelinmäki Water Tower.

== Design and construction ==
Water towers in the region, many of which were built in the 19th century, had previously been built from steel. They have been described as "ugly and uninspiring" and "marring the skyline". This structure, designed by Ing. Büro Paavo Simula and Company, was intended to be more aesthetic to minimise its effect on the visual environment. It stands on Mustankallio hill.

The tower was completed in 1963 by local construction firm B&K. It is constructed of pre-stressed concrete elements built locally, under license from the German Dyckerhoff & Widmann (Dywidag) company. The main body contains two drinking water reservoirs with a combined capacity of 225,000 imperial gallons (1,020,000 L), protected from freezing by a lining of mineral wool. The exterior is clad with asbestos cement panels.

The structure stands 50 metres (160 ft) tall; the top of the tower is 109 metres (358 ft) above the nearby Lake Vesijärvi and 190 metres (620 ft) above sea level. The uppermost portion of the tower is around 23 metres (75 ft) in diameter. The structure has received praise for its "striking appearance" and "elegant lines". The design has been described as crocus-like.

== Use ==
Lahti Aqua, a company owned by the city of Lahti, owns the tower and uses it to store water for distribution to the town. At night water is pumped into the tank from lower-level storage, during the day water is drained via gravity feed and hydrostatic pressure from the tank for distribution to Mustankallio, Kiveriö, Tonttila and Pyhättömänmäki.

The tower contains a viewing platform with good views across the town. The tower also contains a meeting room capable of housing 30 to 40 people, a sauna that can accommodate 15, a lounge, kitchen, toilet and showers. The facilities are available for rent between 8 a.m. and midnight. Small-sized lifts offer access to the facilities. In 2015, the facade exterior panels were replaced.

It is part of the motif in the 2021 Ironman 70.3 Ironman Triathlon Finland medal.

== See also ==
- Kuwait Water Towers, for an organic "mushroom farm" look by Swedish designers and engineers
- List of tallest towers
