= Sopenkorpi =

District of Lahti, Finland

- District of Lahti
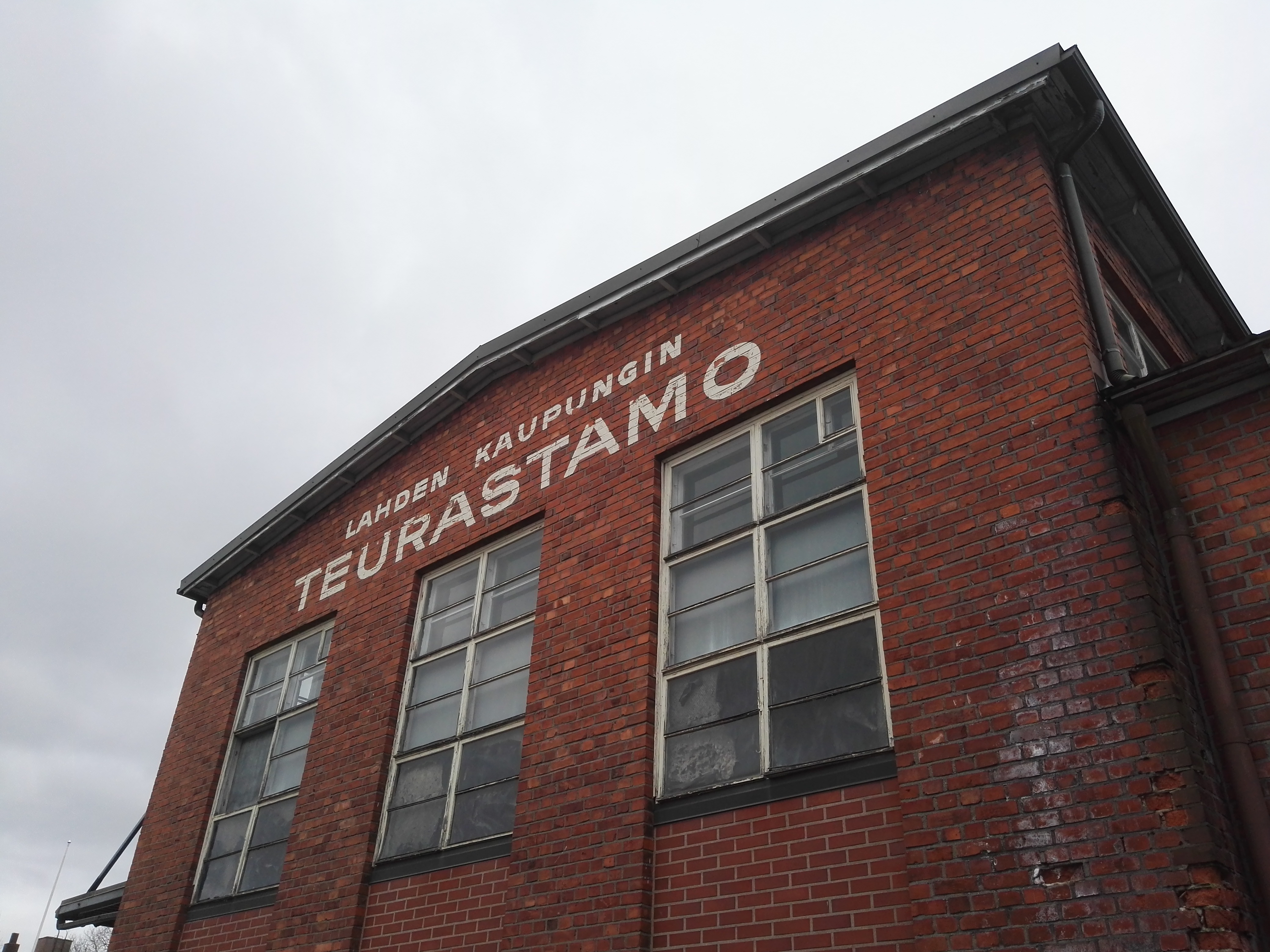
- A former slaughterhouse in the industrial area of Sopenkorpi

- Location within Finland
- Coordinates: 60°58′39″N 25°36′53″E
- Country: Finland
- Region: Päijät-Häme
- Municipality: Lahti

Population (2019)
  - Total: 895
- (approximate)
- Postal codes: 15800
- District number: 26

Sopenkorpi is the 26th district of the city of Lahti, in the region of Päijät-Häme, Finland. It borders the districts of Salpausselkä in the north, Kartano in the northeast, Keski-Lahti in the east, Asemantausta in the southeast, Hennala in the south and Kärpänen in the west.

The population of the statistical area of Sopenkorpi, a further subdivision of the statistical district of Kärpänen, was 895 in 2019.

== History ==
The young city of Lahti purchased the lands of Sopenkorpi in 1912. Its first zoning plan, devised by Carolus Lindberg in 1922, designated it as an industrial area; housing for its workers would also be built. It took until 1937 for construction to really take off, however, along the lines of another zoning plan designed by city architect Kaarlo Könönen.
