= Kuwait Towers =

- Abraj l'Kuwait

- Location within Kuwait

General information
- Type: National building, water tank, restaurant
- Location: Kuwait City, Kuwait
- Coordinates: 29°23′24″N 48°00′11″E
- Construction started: 1971
- Completed: 1976
- Inaugurated: 1 March 1979
- Cost: 4,700,000 KWD (US$ 16,450,000)

Height
- Height: 187 metres (614 ft)

Design and construction
- Architects: Sune Lindström, Malene Bjørn
- Main contractor: Union Inženjering (part of GP Planum)

The Kuwait Towers are a group of three thin towers in Kuwait City, standing on a promontory into the Persian Gulf. They were the sixth, and last, group in the larger Kuwait Water Towers system of 34 towers (33 store water; one stores equipment), and were built in a style considerably different from the other five groups. The Kuwait Towers were officially inaugurated in March 1979 and are regarded as a landmark and symbol of modern Kuwait. The towers were closed for maintenance from March 2012 to 8 March 2016, with a massive fireworks festival commemorating the re-opening. Kuwait Towers facility is operated and managed by the state-owned Touristic Enterprises Company. The Main Tower served as the venue for TEDxKuwaitCity event in 2018 and 2019.

== Design and construction ==
The main tower is 187 metres (614 ft) high and carries two spheres. The lower sphere holds in its bottom half a water tank of 4,500 cubic metres (1,200,000 US gal; 990,000 imp gal) and in its upper half there is a restaurant that accommodates 90 people, a café, a lounge and a reception hall. The upper sphere, which rises to 123 metres (404 ft) above sea level and completes a full turn every 30 minutes, holds a café. The second tower is 147 metres (482 ft) high and serves as a water tower. The third tower does not store water, housing equipment to illuminate the two larger towers. The two water towers hold 9,000 cubic metres (2,400,000 US gal; 2,000,000 imp gal) of water altogether.

The Kuwait Towers were designed by Danish architect Malene Bjørn as part of a water distribution project run by the Swedish engineering company VBB (renamed Sweco in 1997). Chief architect of the company and husband of Malene Bjørn, Sune Lindström, erected five groups of his typical "mushroom" water towers, the Kuwait Water Towers, but the Emir of Kuwait, Sheikh Jaber Al-Ahmed, wanted a more attractive design for the sixth site. Out of ten different designs, three were presented to the Amir, who chose the design built.

VBB contracted construction of the three Kuwait Towers to Union Inženjering (part of GP Planum) construction company of Belgrade, Yugoslavia (now part of Serbia). The towers were built of reinforced concrete and prestressed concrete. Building took place from 1971 to 1976 and the main tower was opened to the public on 1 March 1979.

Approximately 41,000 enameled steel discs cover the three spheres in eight shades of blue, green and gray, recalling the tiled domes of historic mosques. The discs are arranged in spiral patterns around the spheres. According to the architect, the Kuwait Tower group refers to ideals of humanity and technology, symbolised by the globe and the rocket. The towers were damaged heavily by the Iraqis during their occupation of Kuwait from 1990 to 1991. In 1991, after the liberation of Kuwait City during the First Gulf War, Vic Clarke of Nottingham UK abseiled the Kuwait Water Towers during structural surveys.

== Recognition ==
In 1980, the Kuwait Water Towers system, including the Kuwait Towers, was an inaugural recipient of the Aga Khan Award for Architecture.

== Gallery ==
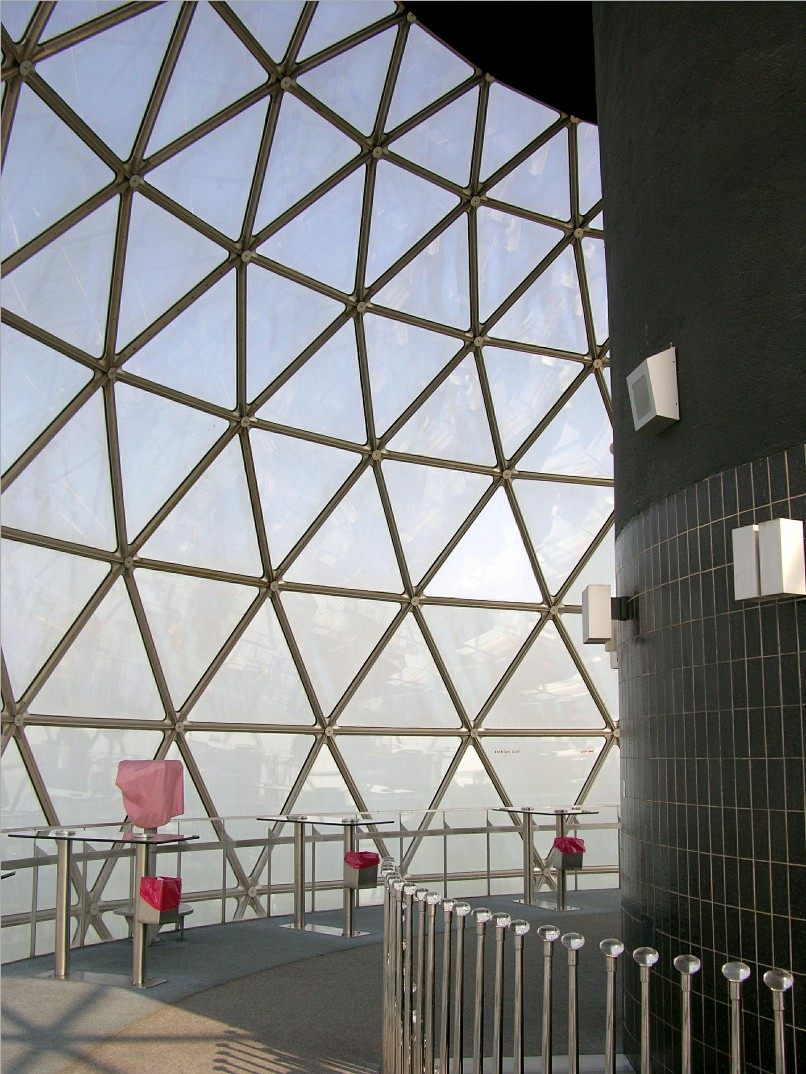

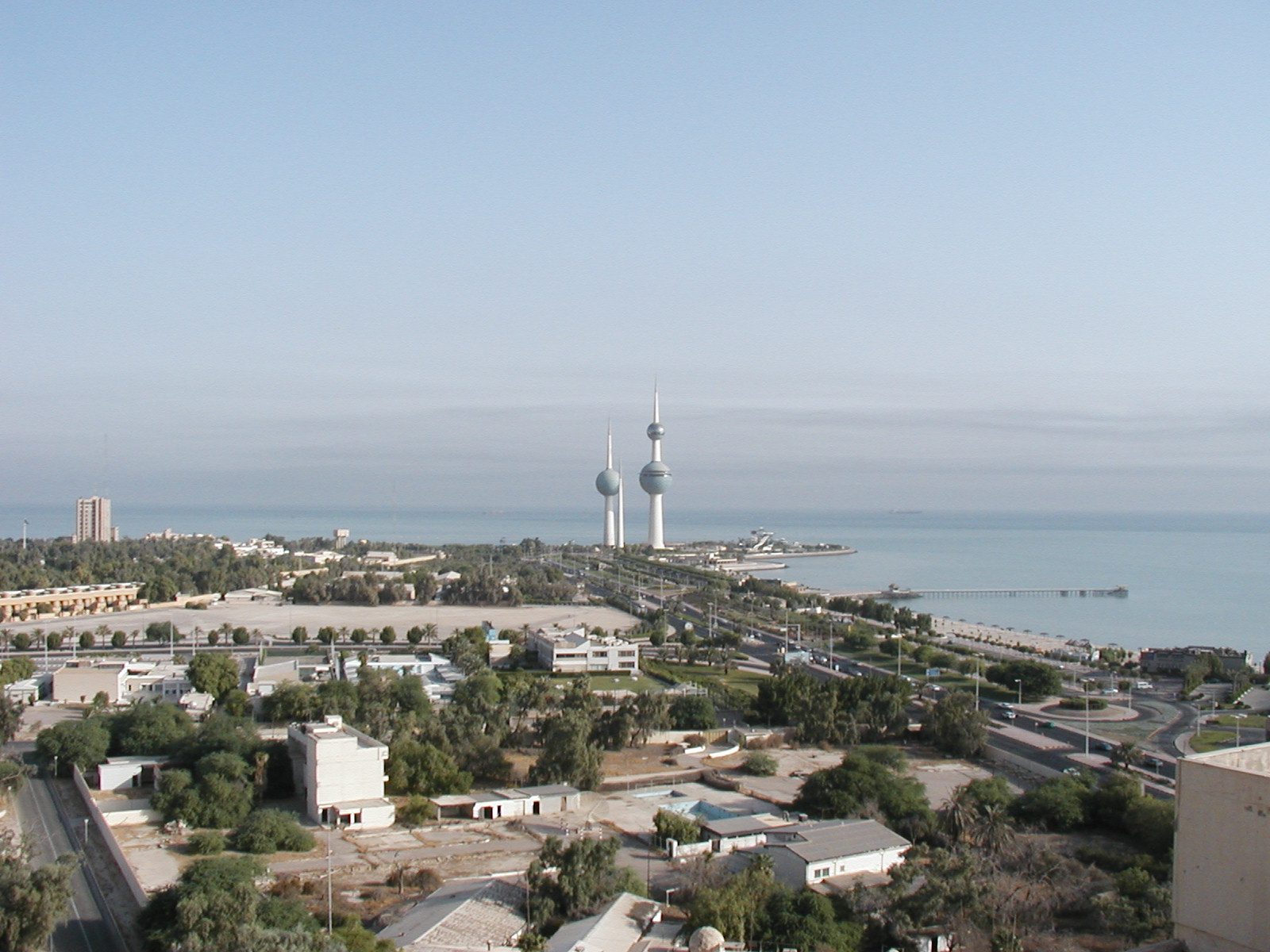

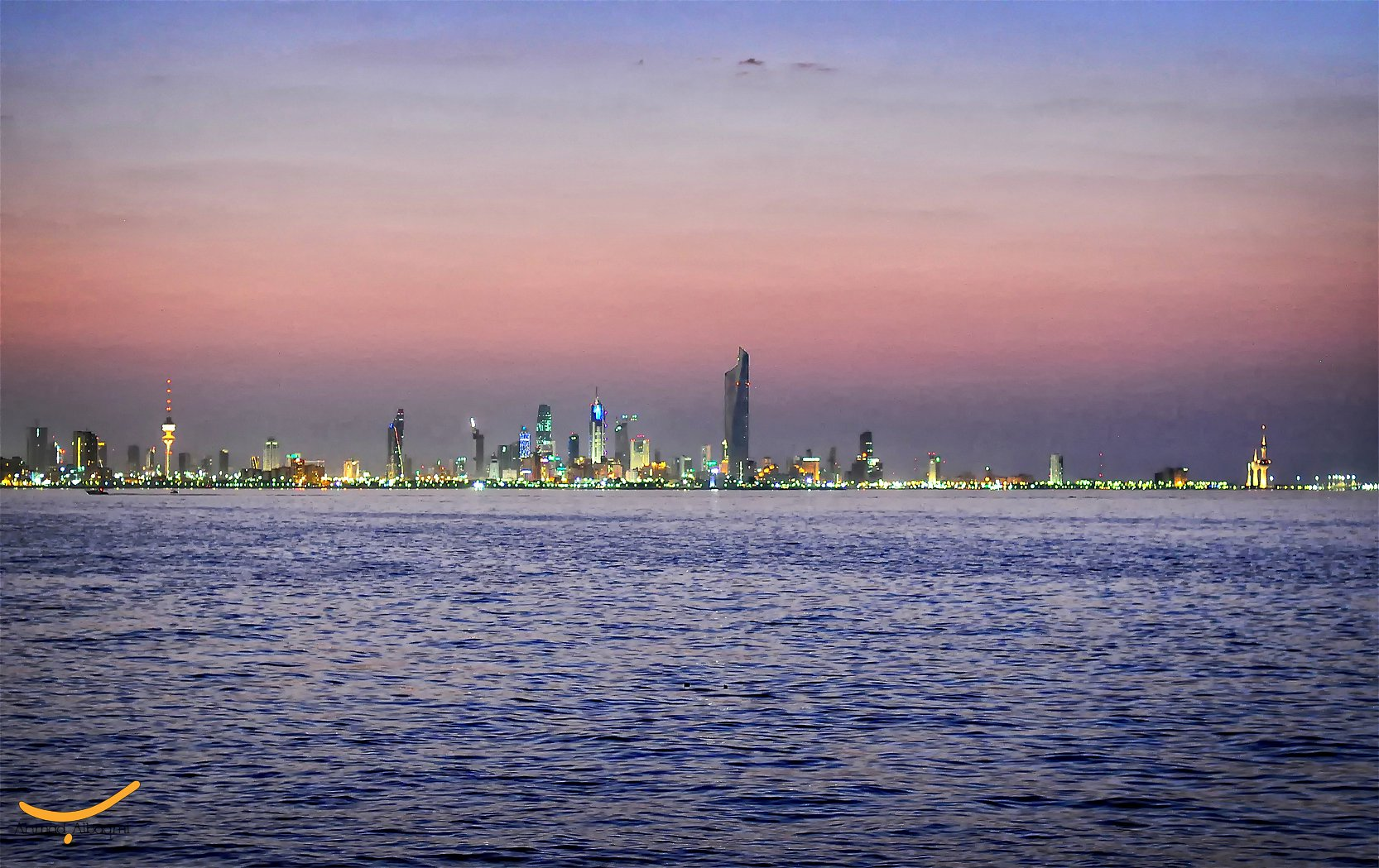

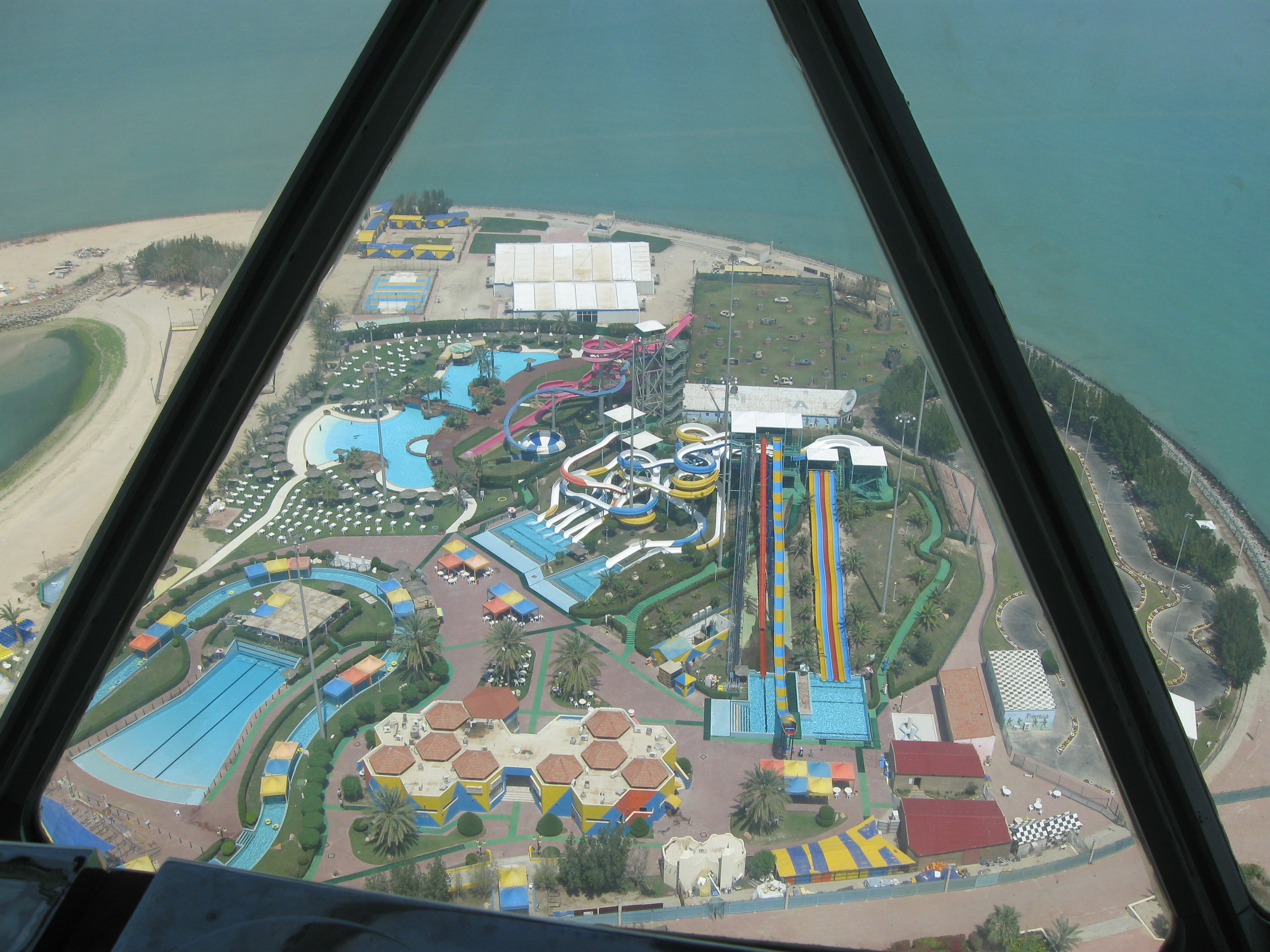

== See also ==
- List of tallest towers in the world
- Liberation Tower (Kuwait)
- Dar Al-Awadhi complex

== Printed sources ==
- Kultermann, Udo, 1999. Contemporary architecture in the Arab states: Renaissance of a region. New York; London: McGraw-Hill. ISBN 0070368317
- Kultermann, Udo, 1981. Kuwait Tower. Malene Bjorn's work in Kuwait. MIMAR: Architecture in Development, 1981:2. pp. 40–41. Hasan-Uddin Khan, ed. Singapore: Concept Media Ltd. ISSN 0129-8372
- Water Towers, 1983. In: Renata Holod, editor; Darl Rasdorfer, associate editor. 1983. Architecture and Community: building in the Islamic world today: the Aga Khan Award for Architecture. pp. 173–181. Millerton: Aperture; Oxford: Phaidon. ISBN 0893811238

== Sources ==
- Aga Khan Award for Architecture. Retrieved 5 August 2012
- Website of the Kuwait Towers. Retrieved 5 August 2012
