= Kiveriö =

- District of Lahti
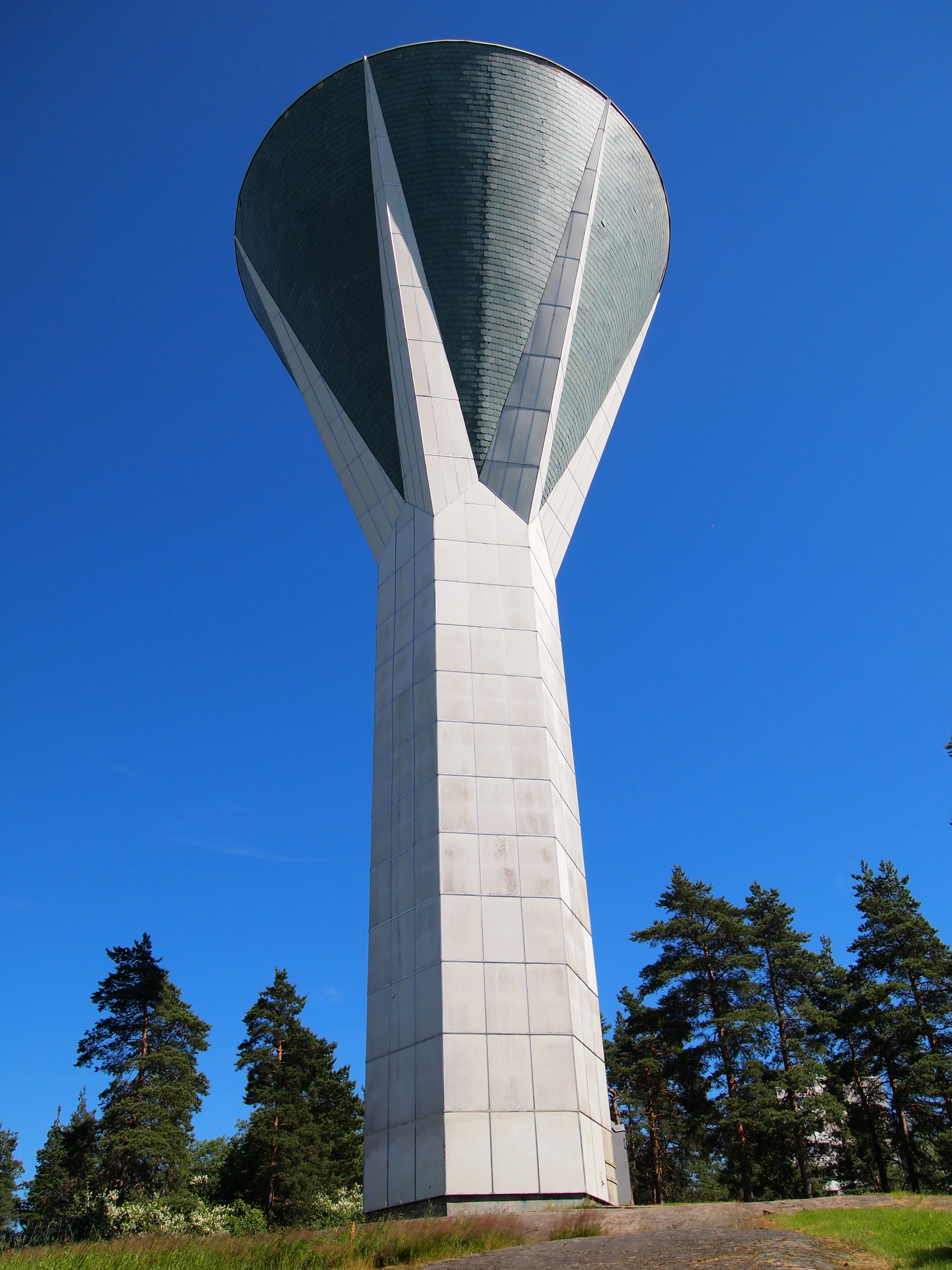
- The Mustankallio water tower in Kiveriö
- Interactive map of Kiveriö
- Coordinates: 60°59′22.92″N 25°40′50.88″E
- Country: Finland
- Region: Päijät-Häme
- Municipality: Lahti

Population (2019)
  - Total: 4,337
- (approximate)
- Postal codes: 15200
- District number: 5

Kiveriö is the 5th district of the city of Lahti, in the region of Päijät-Häme, Finland. It borders the districts of Kivimaa in the north, Kytölä in the northeast, Myllypohja in the east, Möysä and Paavola in the south and Keski-Lahti, Kartano and Niemi in the west.

The population of the statistical district of Kiveriö was 4,337 in 2019.
