= Keski-Lahti =

District in Päijät-Häme, Finland

- District of Lahti
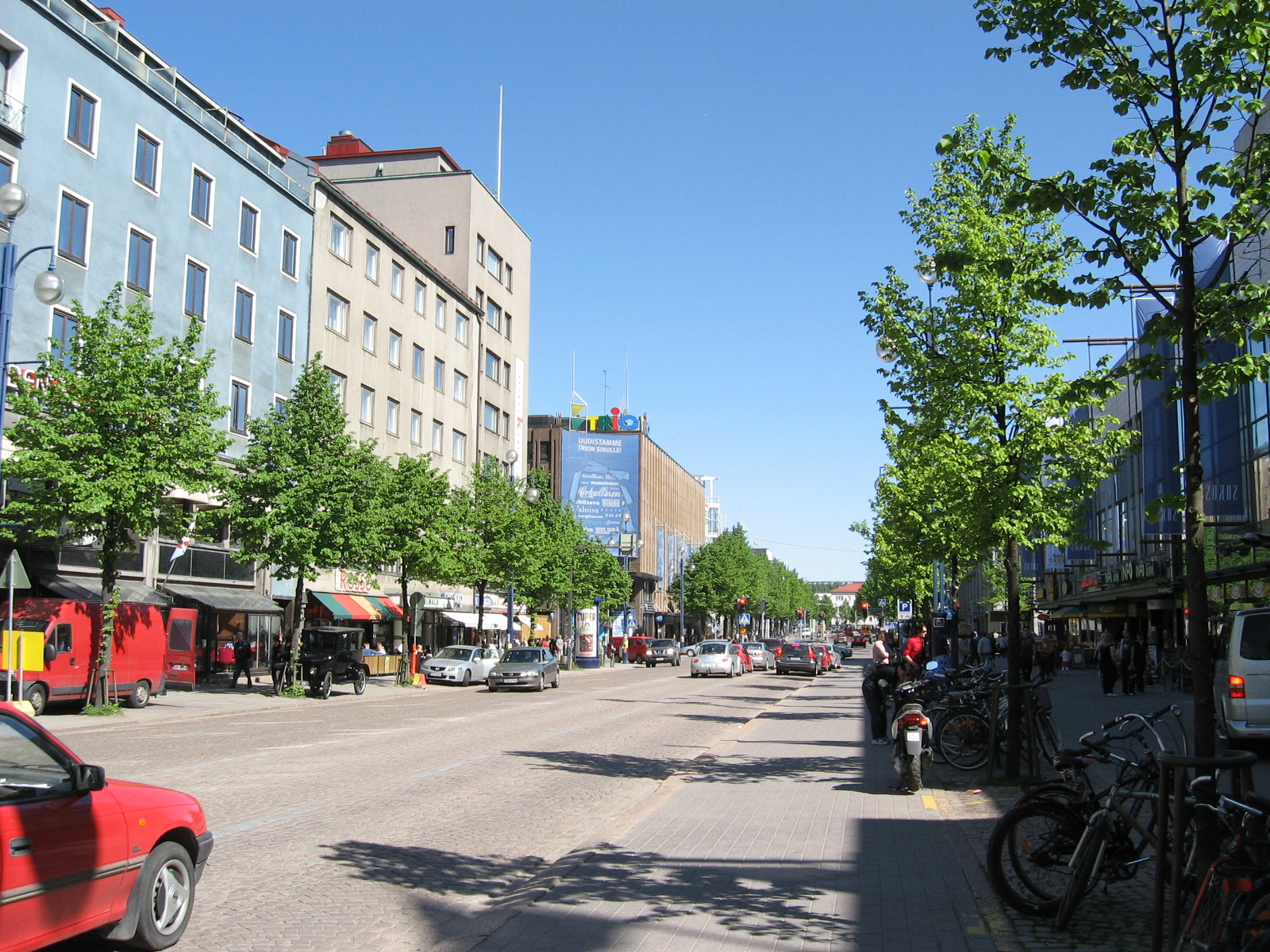
- Aleksanterinkatu street by the Market Square
- Interactive map of Keski-Lahti
- Coordinates: 60.9830°N 25.6572°E
- Country: Finland
- Region: Päijät-Häme
- Municipality: Lahti

Population (2019)
  - Total: 12,054
- (approximate)
- Postal codes: 15100, 15110, 15140
- District number: 1

Keski-Lahti ("Central Lahti"), also known by locals as Keskusta ("The Centre"), is the 1st district of the city of Lahti, in the region of Päijät-Häme, Finland. It covers the downtown areas of the city, circling the Market Square. It borders the districts of Niemi in the north, Kiveriö in the northeast, Paavola and Möysä in the east, Asemantausta in the south, Hennala and Sopenkorpi in the west and Kartano in the northwest.

The combined population of the statistical districts of Ydinkeskusta and Pohjoinen keskusta, approximately covering the area of Keski-Lahti, was 12,054 in 2019.

Keski-Lahti has been recorded as the most dangerous district in Finland, with almost 80 homicide cases registered within 20 years.

== History ==
Upon the destruction of the village of Lahti in the fire of 19 June 1877, an initiative to create the first zoning plan for the area that would become Keski-Lahti was started. Governor of the Häme Province Reinhold von Ammondt travelled to the derelict village on the day after the fire, and with the help of the taxman of the hundred of Hollola, K. Palmgren, took upon the planning of land acquisitions for the purpose of establishing a market town. The initiative was closely related to the prior ambitions of founding a city, but this would not happen for some thirty years; instead, Lahti became a market town in 1878, and provincial architect Alfred Caween's proposal for the first zoning plan was completed in the same year. It consisted of 22 blocks, and was 43 hectares in area and rectangular in shape. The overall character of the plan is still present in the current layout of Keski-Lahti.
