= Kivimaa =

- District of Lahti
- Interactive map of Kivimaa
- Coordinates: 60°59′53″N 25°40′27″E
- Country: Finland
- Region: Päijät-Häme
- Municipality: Lahti

Population (2019)
  - Total: 4,157
- (approximate)
- Postal codes: 15210
- District number: 6
- Neighbouring districts: Niemi; Kiveriö; Mukkula; Pesäkallio; Kytölä

Kivimaa is the 6th district of the city of Lahti, in the region of Päijät-Häme, Finland.

The population of the statistical district of Kivimaa was 4,157 in 2019.
