= Kilpiäinen =

- District of Lahti
- Interactive map of Kilpiäinen
- Coordinates: 61°1′14″N 25°39′11″E
- Country: Finland
- Region: Päijät-Häme
- Municipality: Lahti

Population (2019)
  - Total: 3,127
- (approximate)
- Postal codes: 15240
- District number: 8

Kilpiäinen is the 8th district of the city of Lahti, in the region of Päijät-Häme, Finland. It borders the municipality of Hollola in the north, the districts of Pesäkallio in the east and Mukkula in the south, and lake Vesijärvi in the west.

The population of the statistical district of Kilpiäinen was 3,127 in 2019.
