= Asemantausta =

- District of Lahti
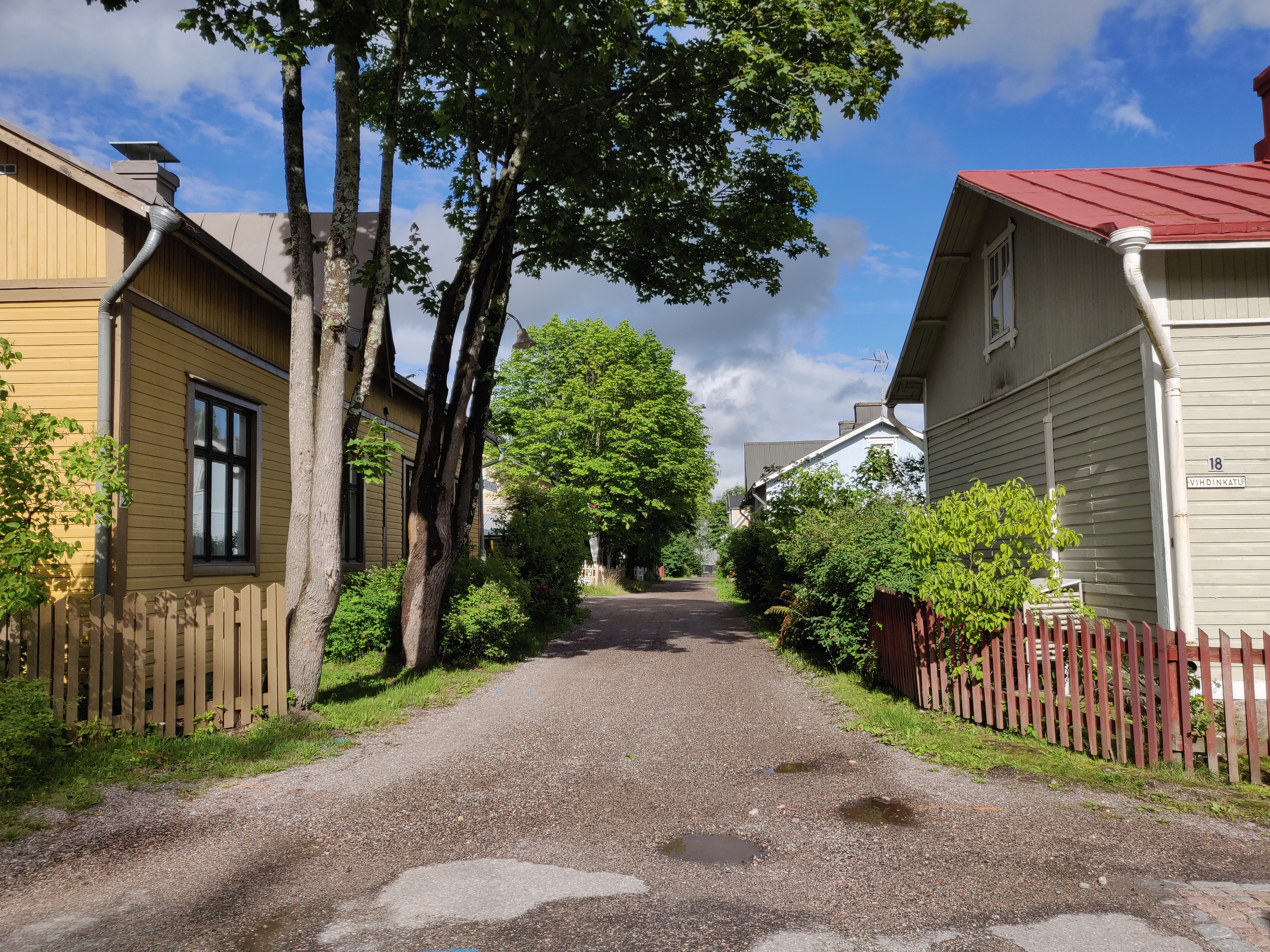
- Residencies in Anttilanmäki
- Interactive map of Asemantausta
- Coordinates: 60°58′28″N 25°39′6″E
- Country: Finland
- Region: Päijät-Häme
- Municipality: Lahti

Population (2019)
  - Total: 4,969
- (approximate)
- Postal codes: 15100
- District number: 25
- Neighbouring districts: Keski-Lahti; Möysä; Kerinkallio; Laune; Sopenkorpi; Hennala

Asemantausta is the 25th district of the city of Lahti, in the region of Päijät-Häme, Finland.

The population of the statistical district of Asemantausta was 4,969 in 2019.

In the past, Asemantausta was also called Paanantaka in the colloquial language. In German, railway is Eisenbahn, which has become paana in the Finnish language, meaning more broadly not only the railway but also another passageway (German: Bahn).

In the 1970s, the area was still mostly farmland, but as the southern part of Laune developed into a commercial center (e.g. Prisma and K-Citymarket and hardware stores), business premises and residential buildings have also been built in Asemantausta.
