= Lahti Summit =

The Lahti Summit was a summit meeting of 20 heads of state or government that took place in the town of Lahti in Finland on the 3rd week of October 2006.

During this summit Russian president Vladimir Putin famously jibed Italy saying that "mafia" is an "Italian word".
