= Paavola, Lahti =

Paavola
- District of Lahti
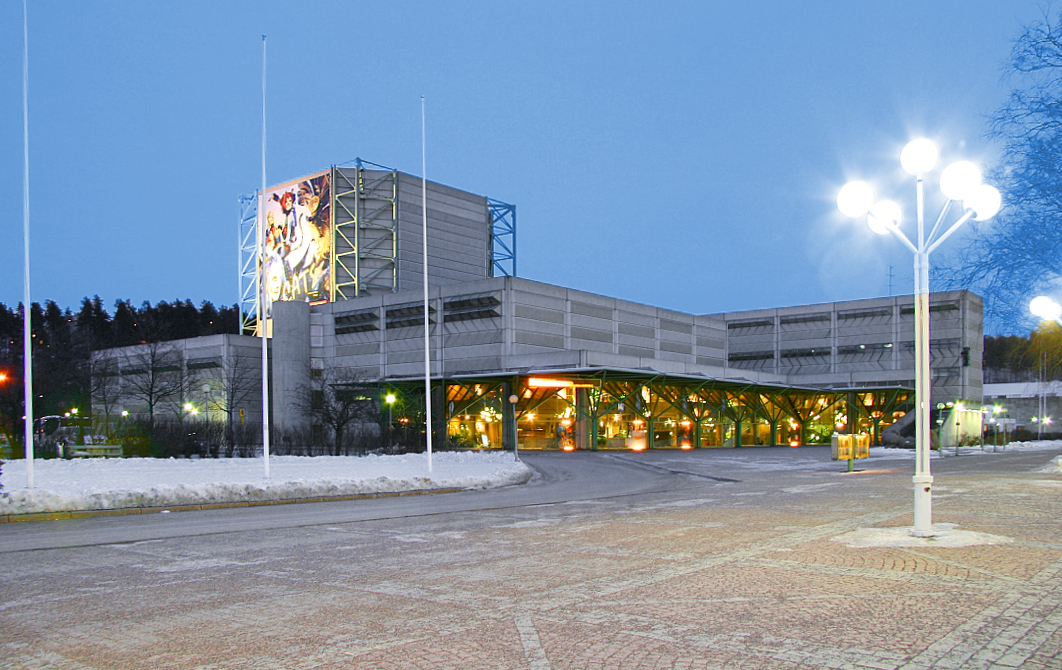
- The Lahti city theatre in Paavola
- Interactive map of Paavola
- Coordinates: 60°58′56.64″N 25°40′28.92″E
- Country: Finland
- Region: Päijät-Häme
- Municipality: Lahti

Population (2019)
  - Total: 3,959
- (approximate)
- Postal codes: 15140
- District number: 3

Paavola is the 3rd district of the city of Lahti, in the region of Päijät-Häme, Finland. It borders the districts of Kiveriö in the north, Möysä in the east and Keski-Lahti in the west.

The population of the statistical district of Itäinen keskusta, which covers Paavola as well as small parts of Keski-Lahti and Möysä, was 3,959 in 2019.
