= Mukkula =

Mukkula Mokulla
- District of Lahti
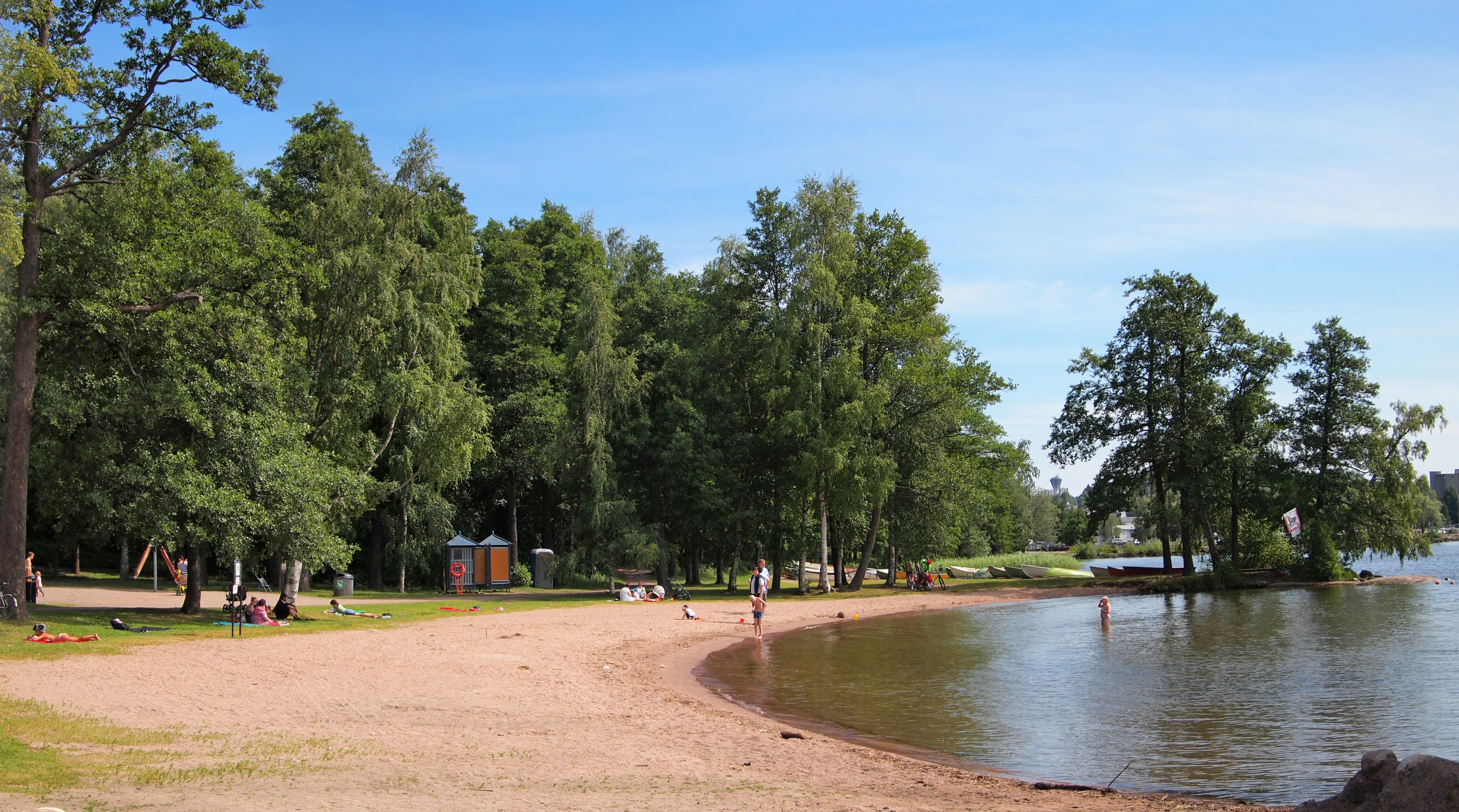
- Interactive map of Mukkula
- Coordinates: 61°00′55″N 25°40′03″E
- Country: Finland
- Region: Päijät-Häme
- Municipality: Lahti

Population (2019)
  - Total: 4,262
- (approximate)
- Postal codes: 15240
- District number: 7
- Neighbouring districts: Niemi; Kivimaa; Kilpiäinen; Pesäkallio; Kytölä

Mukkula (Swedish: Mokulla) is the 7th district of the city of Lahti, in the region of Päijät-Häme, Finland.

Mukkula has belonged to Hollola, from where it was joined to Lahti in 1933. In Swedish, the name has been Mokulla or Muckula.

The population of the statistical district of Mukkula was 4,262 in 2019.
