= Kytölä =

- District of Lahti
- Interactive map of Kytölä
- Coordinates: 61°0′33″N 25°42′1″E
- Country: Finland
- Region: Päijät-Häme
- Municipality: Lahti

Population (2019)
  - Total: 1,955
- (approximate)
- Postal codes: 15230
- District number: 10

Kytölä is the 10th district of the city of Lahti, in the region of Päijät-Häme, Finland. It borders the districts of Pesäkallio in the north, Viuha in the northeast, Ahtiala in the east, Myllypohja in the southeast, Kiveriö and Kivimaa in the southwest and Mukkula in the west.

By a governmental decree made on 29 October 1954, Kytölä became part of Lahti on 1 January 1956.

The combined population of the statistical districts of Kytölä and Vipunen, the latter of which comprises the industrial area in the southwestern part of the district, was 1,955 in 2019.
