= Launeen keskuspuisto =

Park in Lahti, Finland

Coordinates: 60.9719°N 25.6485°E

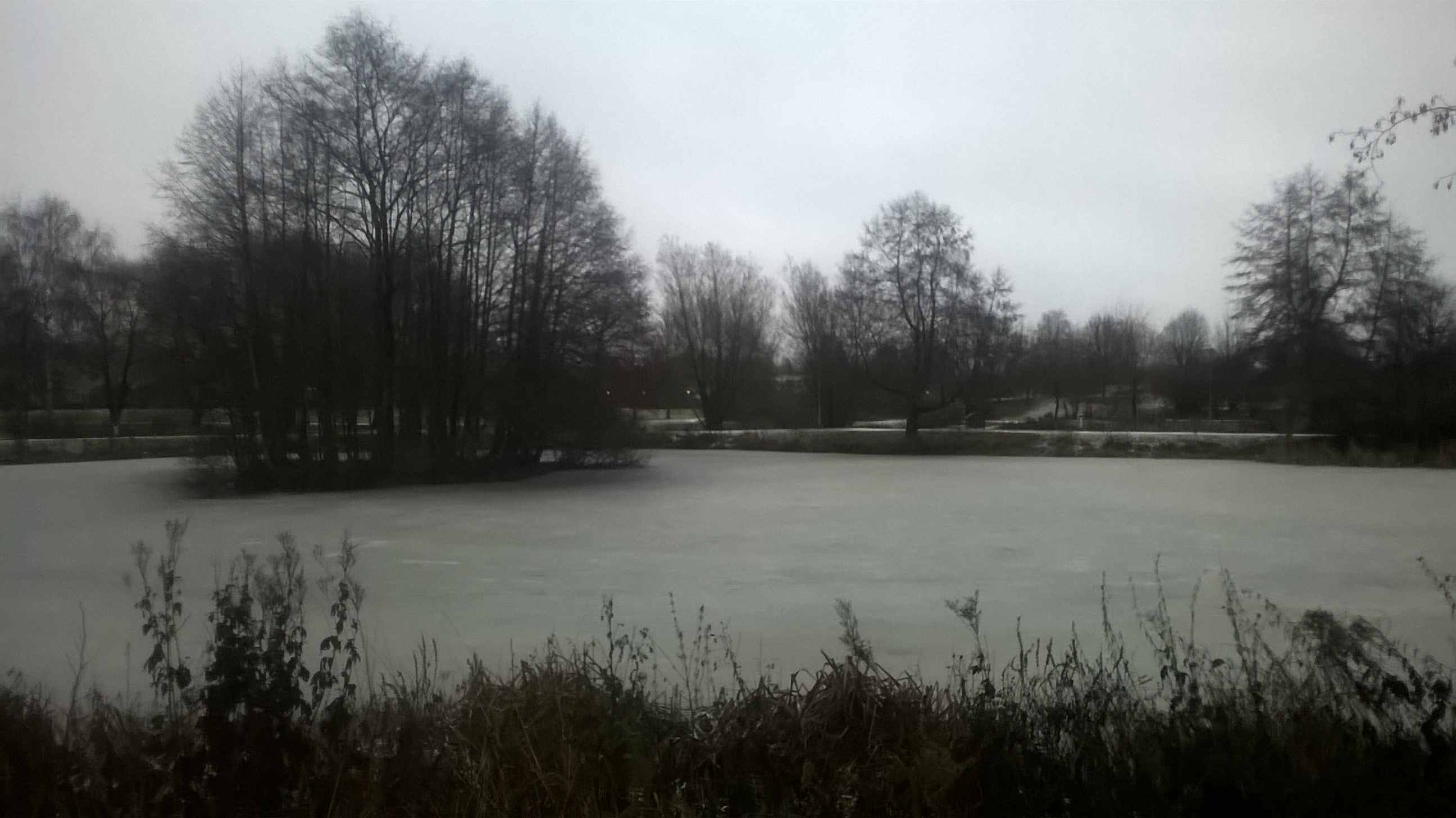
Winter view

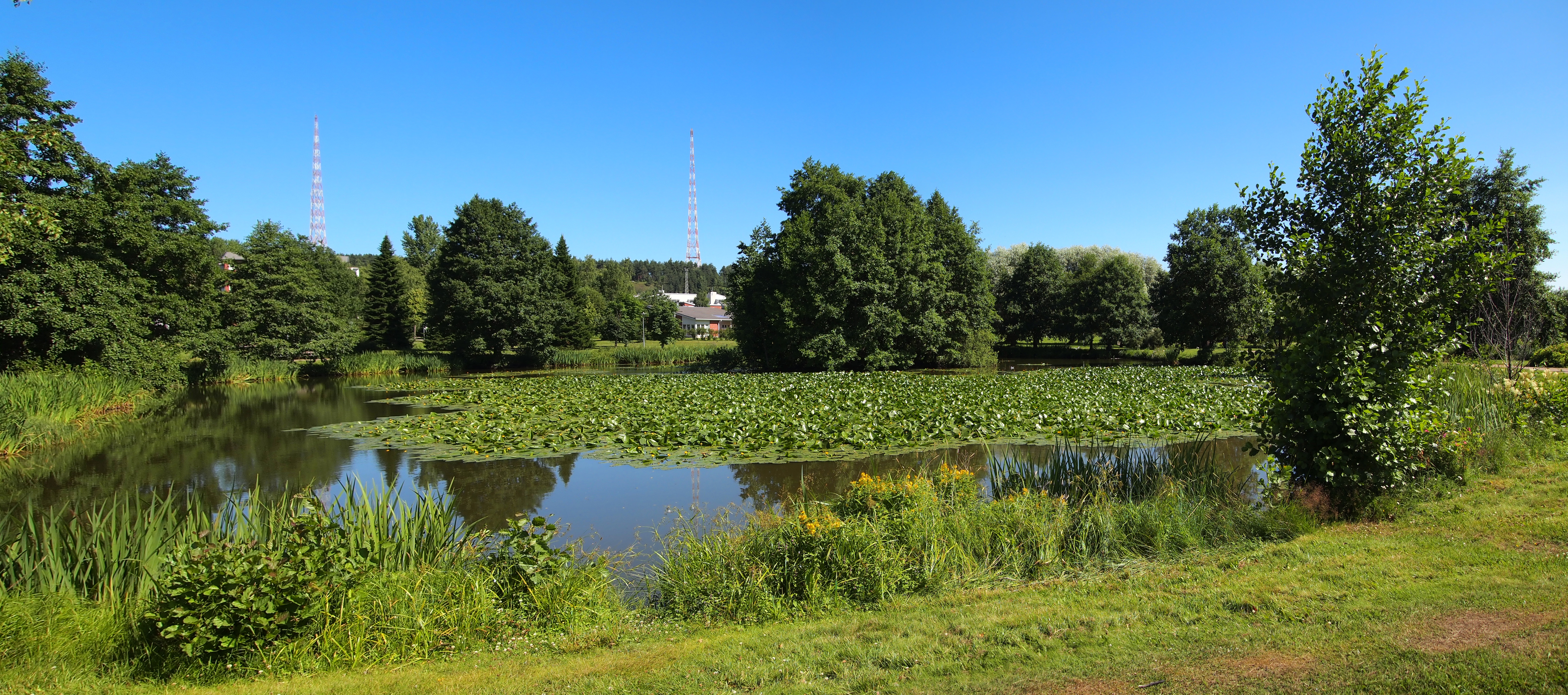
A pond in Launeen keskuspuisto

Launeen keskuspuisto is a park near Launeen perhepuisto in Lahti, Finland, established in 1989. There is an arboretum housing almost 500 different plants, in addition to two ponds.

The park is known for its outdoor activities such as its disc golf gaming arena, water park, three mini golf tracks, a sports hall, a skate board area and a dog park.

Perhepuisto has about 100,000 visitors per year.
