= Kuwait Water Towers =

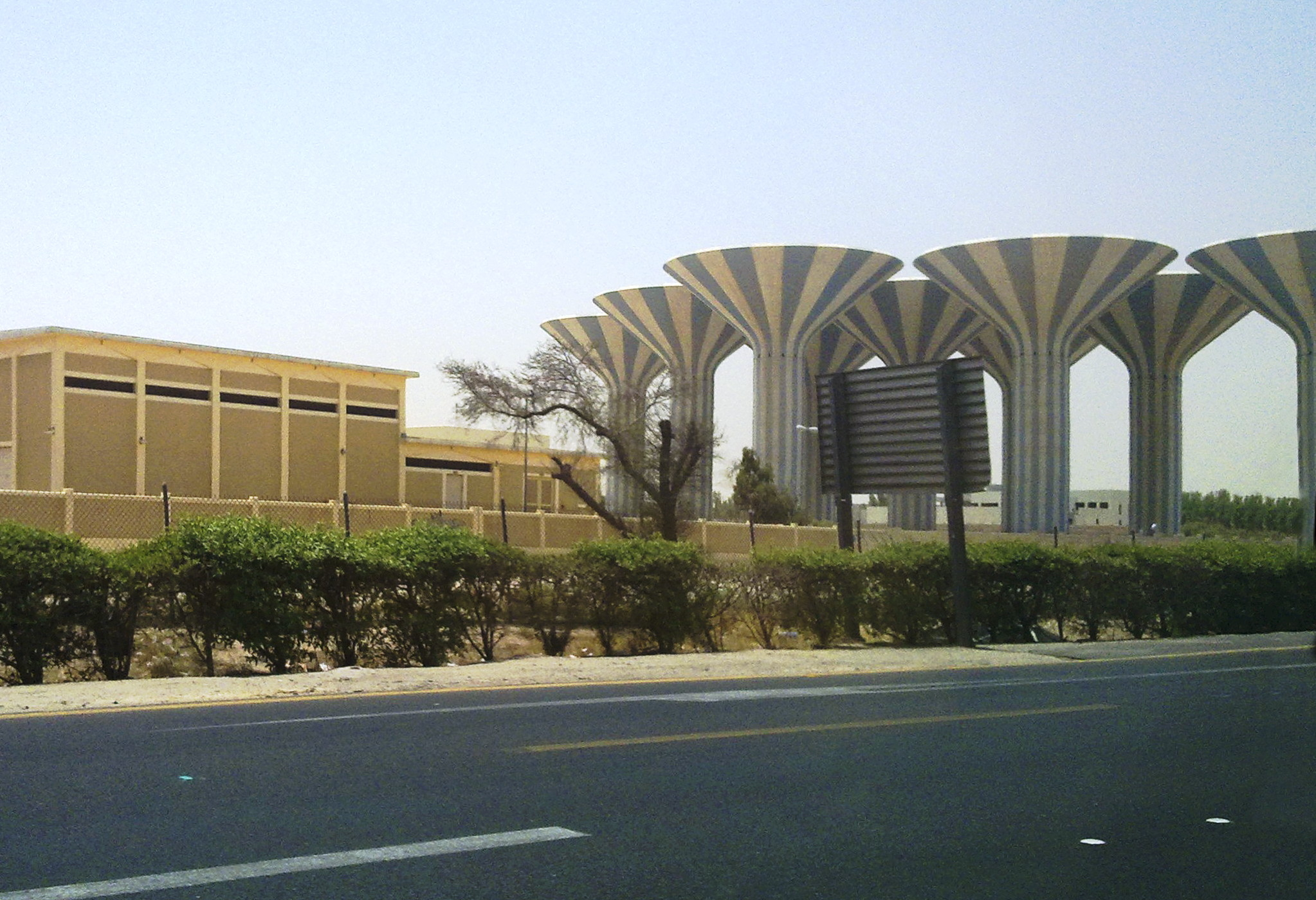
- A group of nine towers

- Location within Kuwait

General information
- Type: Water tower
- Location: Kuwait City, Kuwait
- Coordinates: 29°19′46″N 47°59′04″E
- Construction started: February 1970
- Completed: December 1976
- Cost: 2,800,000 KWD (US$ 9,800,000)

Height
- Height: 35–40 m

Dimensions
- Diameter: 40 m (130 ft)

Technical details
- Structural system: standard reinforced concrete, prestressed concrete

Design and construction
- Architect: (Sweden) Sune Lindström

The Kuwait Water Towers are a prominent group of 31 water towers in Kuwait City, Kuwait that were completed in 1976.

== Design and construction ==
In 1965, the government of Kuwait commissioned the Swedish engineering company of VBB (since 1997 Sweco) to develop and implement a plan for a modern water-supply system for Kuwait City. The company built five groups of water towers, 31 in total, designed by its chief architect Sune Lindström, called "the mushroom towers". They were built by VBB out of standard reinforced concrete. Each tower holds 3,000 cubic meters of water. The tower groups are distinguished by number, height, color and ornamentation and they serve as landmarks for their districts.

For a sixth site, the Amir of Kuwait, Sheikh Jaber Al-Ahmed, wanted a more spectacular design. This last group, known as Kuwait Towers, consists of three towers, two of which also serve as water towers. Water from the desalination facility is pumped up to the tower.

These thirty-three towers have together a standard capacity of 102,000 cubic meters of water. "The Water Towers" (The Kuwait Tower and the Kuwait Water Towers) were awarded the Aga Khan Award for Architecture (1980 Cycle).

== See also ==
- Svampen
- Mustankallio water tower, for an organic "crocus" like look by Finnish designers and engineers

== Sources ==
- Kultermann, Udo, 1999. Contemporary architecture in the Arab states: Renaissance of a region. New York; London: McGraw-Hill. ISBN 0-07-036831-7
- Kultermann, Udo, 1981. Kuwait Tower. Malene Bjorn's work in Kuwait. MIMAR: Architecture in Development, 1981:2. p 40–41. Hasan-Uddin Khan, ed. Singapore: Concept Media Ltd. ISSN 0129-8372
- Water Towers, 1983. In: Renata Holod, editor; Darl Rasdorfer, associate editor. 1983. Architecture and Community: building in the Islamic world today: the Aga Khan Award for Architecture. p. 173-181. Millerton: Aperture; Oxford: Phaidon. ISBN 0-89381-123-8
- Arkitekturmuseets tidning. (Sweden) 2008. nr.9. p. 48-49 ISBN 978-91-633-3920-2
- Aga Khan Award for Architecture. Retrieved 5 August 2012
