= Sweco =

Swedish engineering and architecture company

SWECO AB
- Company type: Publicly traded Aktiebolag
- Traded as: Nasdaq Stockholm: SWEC A (Class A); Nasdaq Stockholm: SWEC B (Class B)
- Industry: Engineering
- Founded: 1997
- Founder: Gunnar Nordström
- Headquarters: Kungsholmen, Stockholm, Sweden
- Area served: Mainly northern Europe
- Key people: Johan Nordström (chairman); Åsa Bergman (president and CEO)
- Products: Consultancy
- Revenue: 2.5 billion euro
- Number of employees: 22,000 (2024)
- Parent: Investment AB Latour (31.0%)
- Website: SWECO

Sweco (originally "Swedish Consultants") is a European engineering consultancy company, active in the fields of consulting engineering, environmental technology and architecture. Sweco is one of Europe's leading architecture and engineering consultancy company, established in 14 countries (Sweden, Norway, Finland, Denmark, Estonia, Lithuania, Bulgaria, Czech Republic, Germany, Belgium, Netherlands, UK, Ireland and Poland). Sweco carries out projects in 70 countries annually throughout the world.

Sweco plans and designs buildings and community infrastructure. The company assists with analysis, calculations, studies and the planning, design and construction of what is to be built.

The company is listed on NASDAQ OMX Stockholm since 1998, and has since acquired more than a hundred companies of varying sizes. Åsa Bergman is president and CEO since 2018.

== History ==
Sweco was formed in 1997 through the acquisition of VBB group (Vattenbyggnadsbyrån AB) by FFNS (Falck/Fogelvik/Nordström/Smas AB). The name Sweco is an abbreviation of "Swedish Consultants", a name that had been used by VBB on its international projects. VBB had conducted its first international project in St. Petersburg in 1902; by the 21st century, the companies in Sweco's portfolio had carried out projects in more than 100 countries. Sweco expanded as a company over time, largely as a result of over 130 mergers that have been completed since its listing in 1998.

The oldest of the various engineering offices under its umbrella formerly traded as Theorells Installationskonsult AB, which was founded in 1889 by Swedish MSE Hugo Theorell; it was rebranded as Sweco Systems AB following its acquisition. Due this heritage, Sweco had claimed over 130 years of experience in engineering projects. During 2018, BML Ingenieurgesellschaft mbH and Götzelmann + Partner GmbH joined Sweco. The two companies strengthen the areas of technical building equipment as well as wastewater. That same year, the company launched an international campaign called Urban Insight, which looks at current challenges in urban development.

Sweco has grown both organically and through acquisition. Sweco has extensive experience in acquisitions and has been a force for consolidation in Sweden, the Nordic region and in northern Europe. Sweco has since 1998 acquired over 100 companies, and has its historical roots in a number of companies, among them:

- BECO
- BLOCO
- Theorells Installationskonsult AB
- VBB
- Vectura Consulting AB
- VIAK
- Grontmij
- Årstiderne Arkitekter
- MLM Group
- KANT Architects
- OJ Rådgivende Ingeniører

By 2019, Sweco Group employed 16,000 people, including 5,600 in Sweden. With just over 30%, the company's largest shareholder is Investment AB Latour, which belongs to Swede Gustaf Douglas.

== Notable projects ==
- Abu Simbel temples – the relocation of the temples in the 1960s
- Bloomberg European Headquarters, London
- City Tunnel (Malmö)
- European Spallation Source (ESS), Lund
- Facebook data center, Luleå
- Kuwait Towers
- Kuwait Water Towers
- Stockholm City Line
- Tegera Arena
- The Northern Link (Norra länken)
- The Ray Farringdon, London
- Øresund Bridge, Malmö & Köpenhamn
- Bybanen
- Oosterweel Link
