= Ahtiala =

- District of Lahti
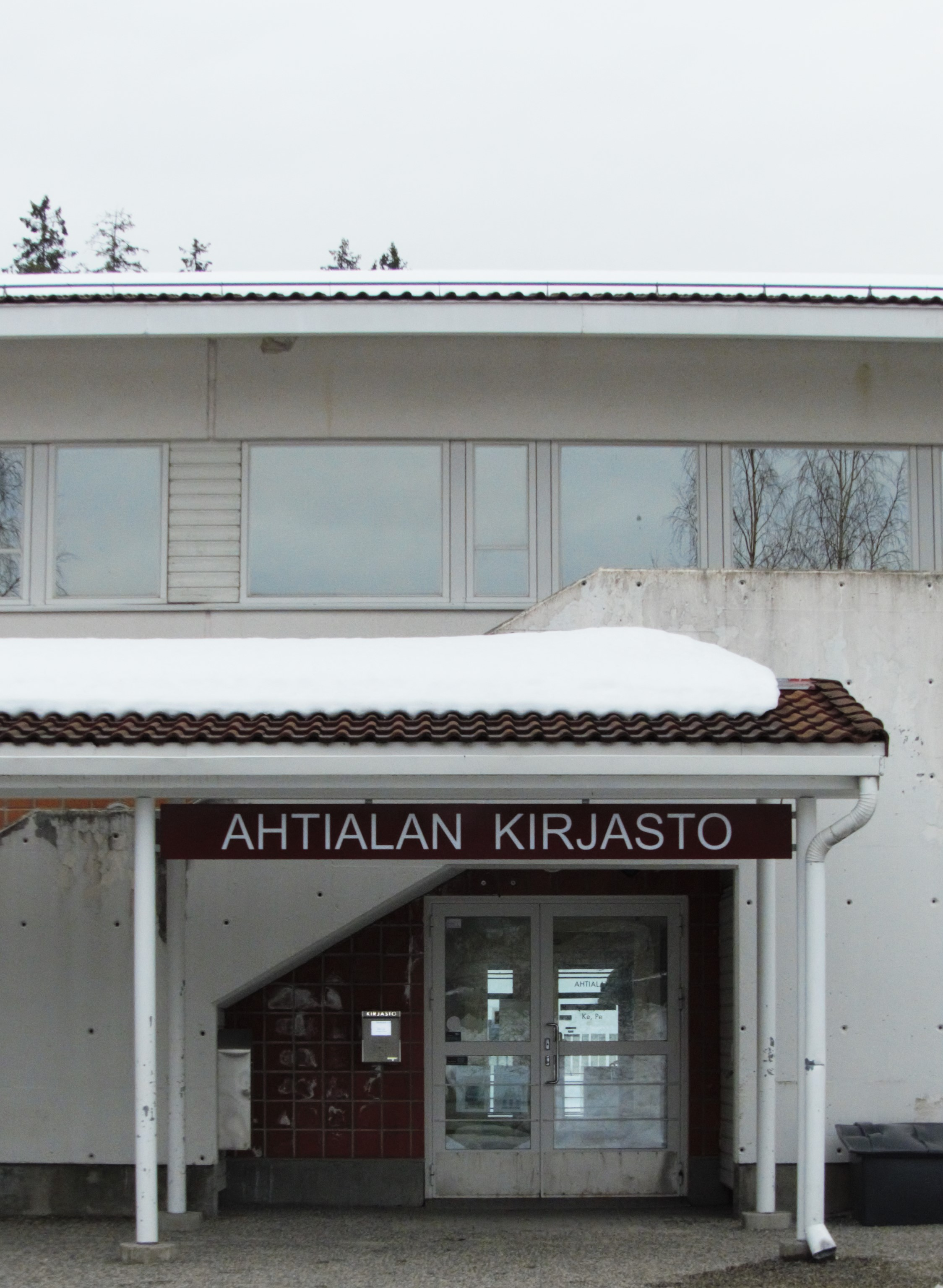
- The public library of Ahtiala
- Interactive map of Ahtiala
- Coordinates: 61°0′12″N 25°46′17″E
- Country: Finland
- Region: Päijät-Häme
- Municipality: Lahti

Population (2019)
  - Total: 5,379
- (approximate)
- Postal codes: 15300, 15320
- District number: 13

Ahtiala is the 13th district of the city of Lahti, in the region of Päijät-Häme, Finland. It borders the districts of Viuha and Seesta in the north, Kunnas in the east, Koiskala in the southeast, Myllypohja in the south and Kytölä in the west.

The population of the statistical district of Ahtiala was 5,379 in 2019.

== History ==
The area now known as Ahtiala has been populated since the Iron Age, as per radiocarbon dating performed on the hill of Paakkolanmäki. Agriculture had been established by the 1400s, and midway through the 1500s, the village of Ahtiala consisted of 24 estates, being the largest in all of the parish of Nastola. It was entirely destroyed in a fire in 1740, after which some of the newly rebuilt estates were moved away from the former centre of the village.

By a governmental decree made on 29 October 1954, Ahtiala was annexed to Lahti from Nastola on 1 January 1956.
