= Niemi, Lahti =

Niemi
- District of Lahti
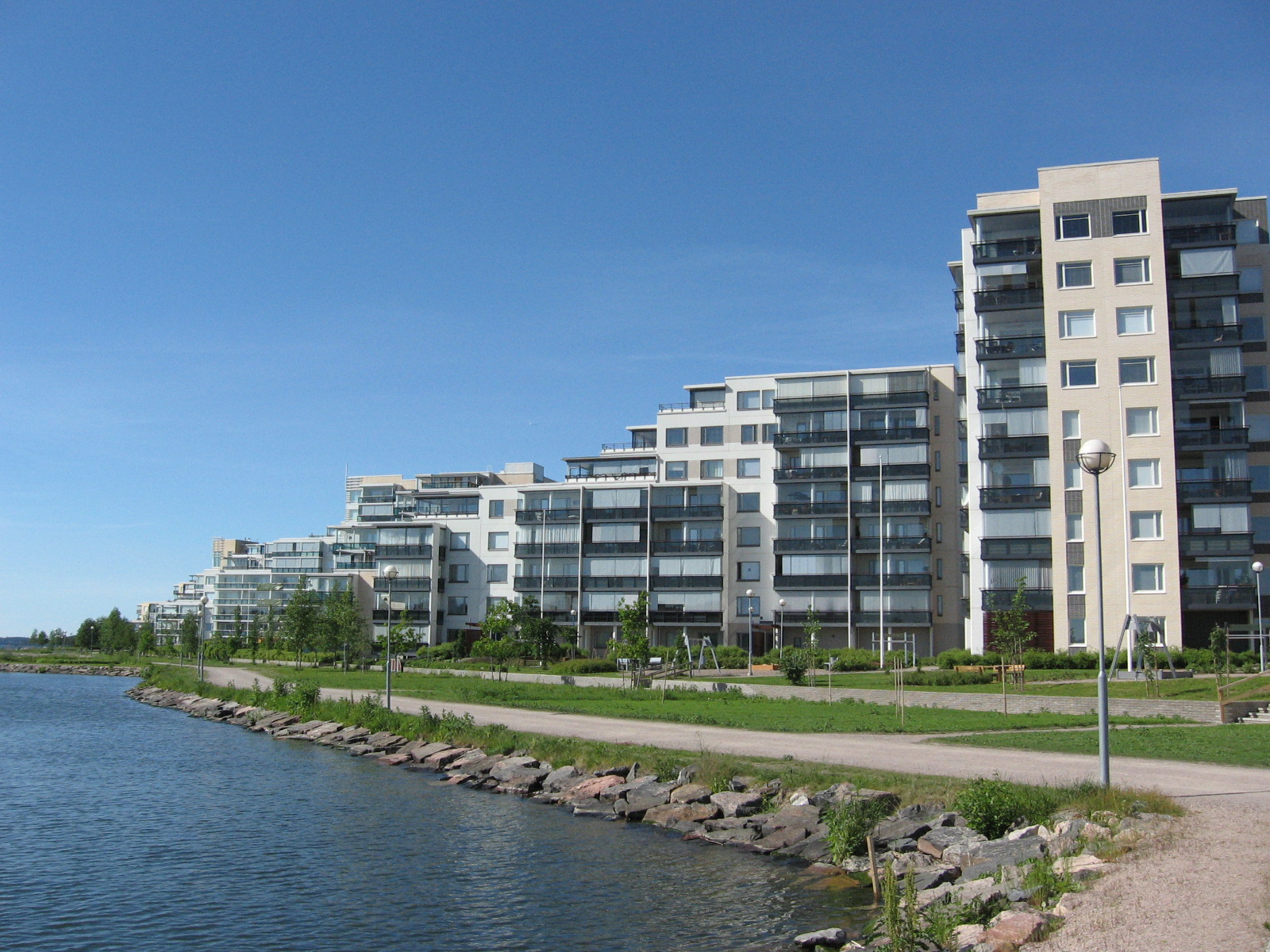
- Apartments by the shore of Vesijärvi in Niemi
- Interactive map of Niemi
- Coordinates: 61°00′18″N 25°39′6.12″E
- Country: Finland
- Region: Päijät-Häme
- Municipality: Lahti

Population (2019)
  - Total: 1,828
- (approximate)
- Postal codes: 15140, 15210
- District number: 4

Niemi is the 4th district of the city of Lahti, in the region of Päijät-Häme, Finland. It borders the districts of Mukkula in the north, Kivimaa in the east, Kiveriö in the southeast and Keski-Lahti and Kartano in the south, as well as lake Vesijärvi in the west.

The population of the statistical district of Niemi was 1,828 in 2019.
