= Kartano =

- District of Lahti
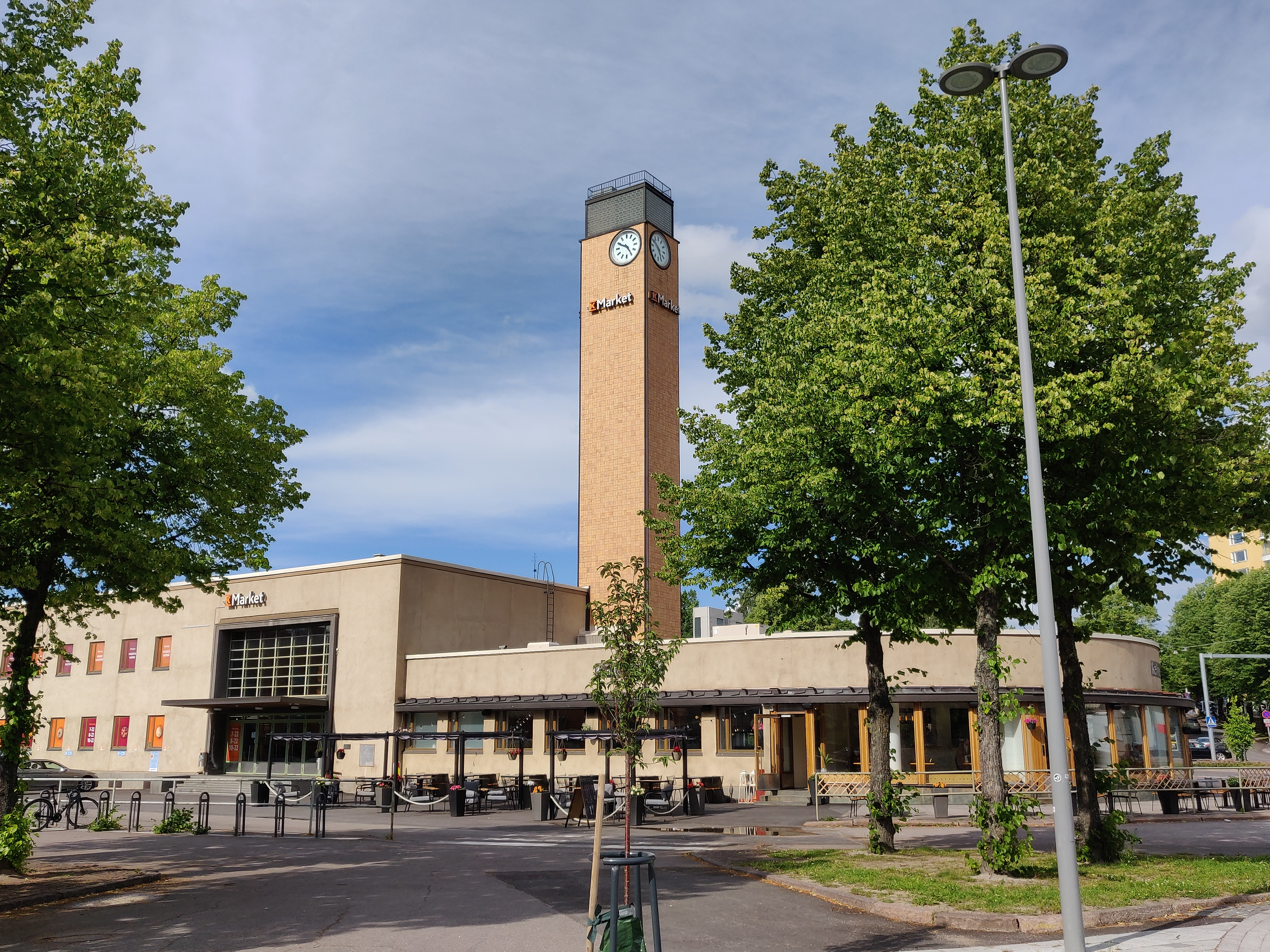
- The old Lahti bus station in Kartano
- Interactive map of Kartano
- Coordinates: 60°59′22.7″N 25°39′22.7″E
- Country: Finland
- Region: Päijät-Häme
- Municipality: Lahti

Population (2019)
  - Total: 5,614
- (approximate)
- Postal codes: 15140
- District number: 2

Kartano is the 2nd district of the city of Lahti, in the region of Päijät-Häme, Finland. It borders the districts of Niemi in the north, Kiveriö in the east, Keski-Lahti in the south, Salpausselkä in the southwest and Jalkaranta in the west.

The district takes its name from the Fellman Manor; the Finnish word kartano directly translates to "manor" in English.

The population of the statistical district of Kartano was 5,614 in 2019.

== Hakatornit ==
The Hakatornit are a series of seven nine-floor apartment buildings on the Paasikivenkatu street in Kartano. Designed by architects Mauri Karkulahti and Eino Tuompo and constructed in 1951–1956, the towers have been proclaimed a built cultural environment of national significance by the Finnish Heritage Agency.

== See also ==
- Lahti bus station
- Vesijärvi railway station
