= GP Planum =

Serbian construction company

- Native name: ГП Планум
- Company type: Joint-stock company
- Industry: Construction
- Founded: 14 January 1948; 78 years ago
- Headquarters: Zemun, Serbia
- Area served: Worldwide
- Key people: Ratomir Todorović (General director)
- Revenue: ▲€2.39 million (2022)
- Net income: ▲€0.01 million (2022)
- Total assets: ▼€15.66 million (2022)
- Total equity: ▲€12.64 million (2022)
- Owner: North Sea Finance d.o.o. (24.94%); Zeymore Trading Limited (23.02%); P.A.T. Inženjering d.o.o. (10.07%); Others
- Number of employees: 92 (2022)
- Website: www.planum.rs

GP Planum (Serbian: ГП Планум) is a Serbian construction company headquartered in Zemun, Serbia.

== History ==
Planum was established in January 1948 in Zemun, Belgrade, SFR Yugoslavia.

Planum was one of the main subcontractors for the A2 motorway construction in Serbia.
