= Lahti =

Lahti Lahtis (Swedish)
- City
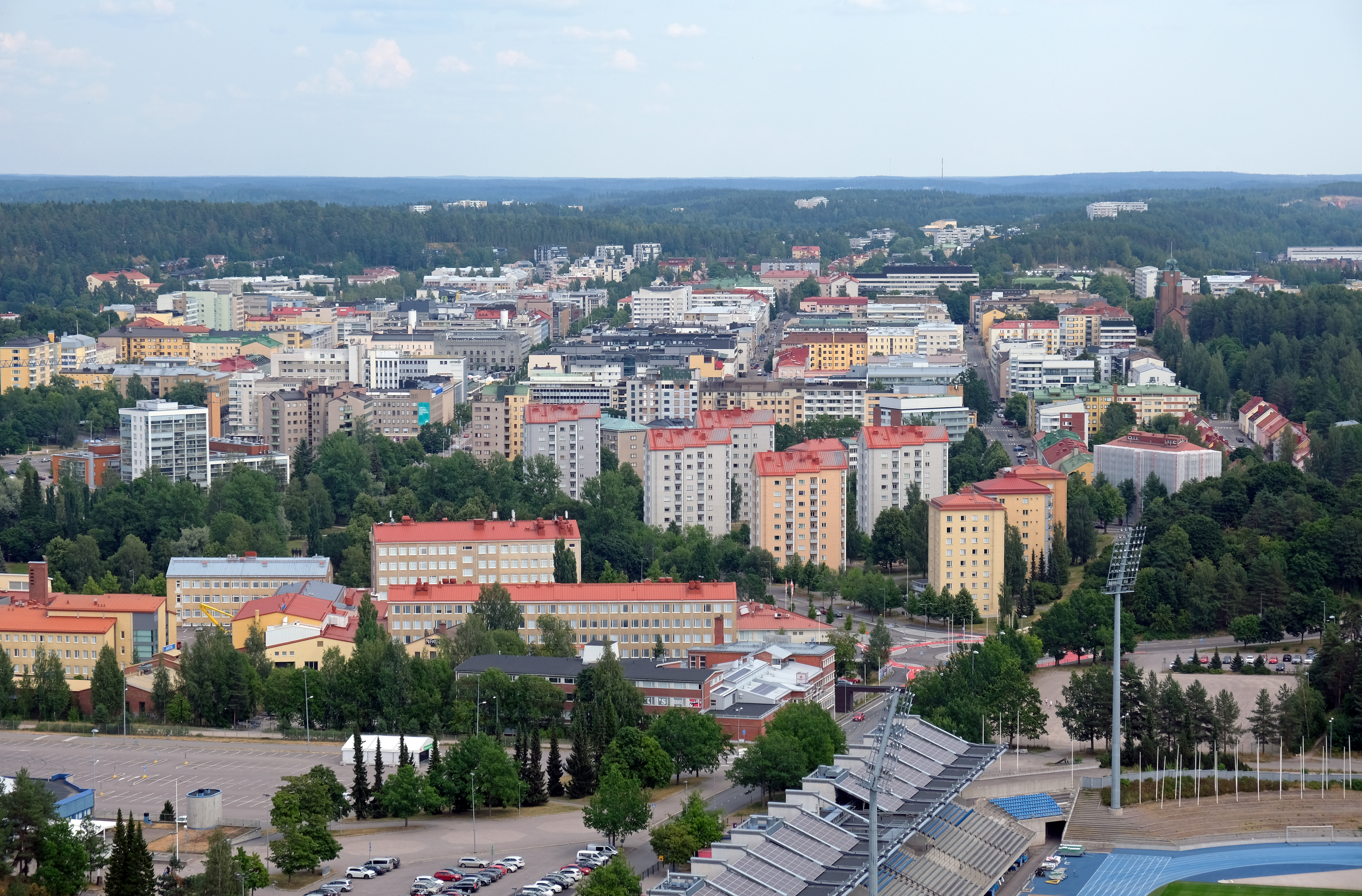
- Centre of the city

- Coat of arms
- Nicknames: Chicago of Finland, Business City
- Location of Lahti in Finland
- Interactive map of Lahti
- Coordinates: 60°59′N 025°39′E
- Country: Finland
- Region: Päijät-Häme
- Sub-region: Lahti
- Charter: June 5, 1878
- City: November 1, 1905

Government
  - City manager: Pekka Timonen

Area (2018-01-01)
  - Total: 517.63 km^{2} (199.86 sq mi)
  - Land: 459.5 km^{2} (177.4 sq mi)
  - Water: 19.53 km^{2} (7.54 sq mi)
  - Rank: 191st largest in Finland

Population (2025-12-31)
  - Total: 121,832
  - Rank: 9th largest in Finland
  - Density: 265.14/km^{2} (686.7/sq mi)

Population by native language
  - Finnish: 88.5% (official)
  - Swedish: 0.5%
  - Others: 11%

Population by age
  - 0 to 14: 14.3%
  - 15 to 64: 60.8%
  - 65 or older: 24.9%
- Time zone: UTC+02:00 (EET)
  - Summer (DST): UTC+03:00 (EEST)
- Website: lahti.fi

Lahti (Finnish pronunciation: [ˈlɑhti], lit. 'bay'; Swedish: Lahtis) is a city in Finland and the regional capital of Päijät-Häme. It is located in the Finnish Lakeland. The population of Lahti is approximately 122,000, while the sub-region has a population of approximately 205,000. It is the 9th most populous municipality in Finland, and the sixth most populous urban area in the country.

Lahti is situated on a bay at the southern end of lake Vesijärvi about 100 kilometres (60 mi) north-east of the capital city Helsinki, 38 kilometres (24 mi) south-west of Heinola and 74 kilometres (46 mi) east of Hämeenlinna, the capital of the region of Kanta-Häme. Lahti is situated at the intersection of Highway 4 (between Helsinki and Jyväskylä) and Highway 12 (between Tampere and Kouvola), which are the most significant main roads of Lahti. Its neighboring municipalities are Asikkala, Heinola, Hollola, Iitti and Orimattila.

Lahti is a long-time pioneering city in environmental sustainability, dating back to as early as 1990 and before. The European Commission has named Lahti as the European Green Capital of 2021. Lahti is also the headquarters of the Salpausselkä UNESCO Global Geopark, one of 4 UNESCO Geoparks in Finland; Salpausselkä was added to the list of over 170 UNESCO Global Geoparks in the world in 2022. In January 2026, the British newspaper The Guardian highlighted Lahti as one of its readers' favorite travel destinations in the Nordic countries, praising its good transport connections from Helsinki, charming little cafes and "quiet, down-to-earth people".

The coat of arms of the city depicts a train wheel surrounded by flames. It refers to the Riihimäki–Saint Petersburg railway, which had a decisive influence on the birth of the city at its crossroads.

== Etymology ==
In English, the Finnish word Lahti literally means 'bay'. Lahti is also dubbed the "Chicago of Finland" due to the similarity of early industries of both cities, when they were known as "slaughterhouse cities". Also, the troubled history of both cities in terms of crime has been seen as one of the similarities.

== History ==
Lahti was first mentioned in documents in 1445. The village belonged to the parish of Hollola and was located at the medieval trade route of Ylinen Viipurintie, which linked the towns of Hämeenlinna and Viipuri.

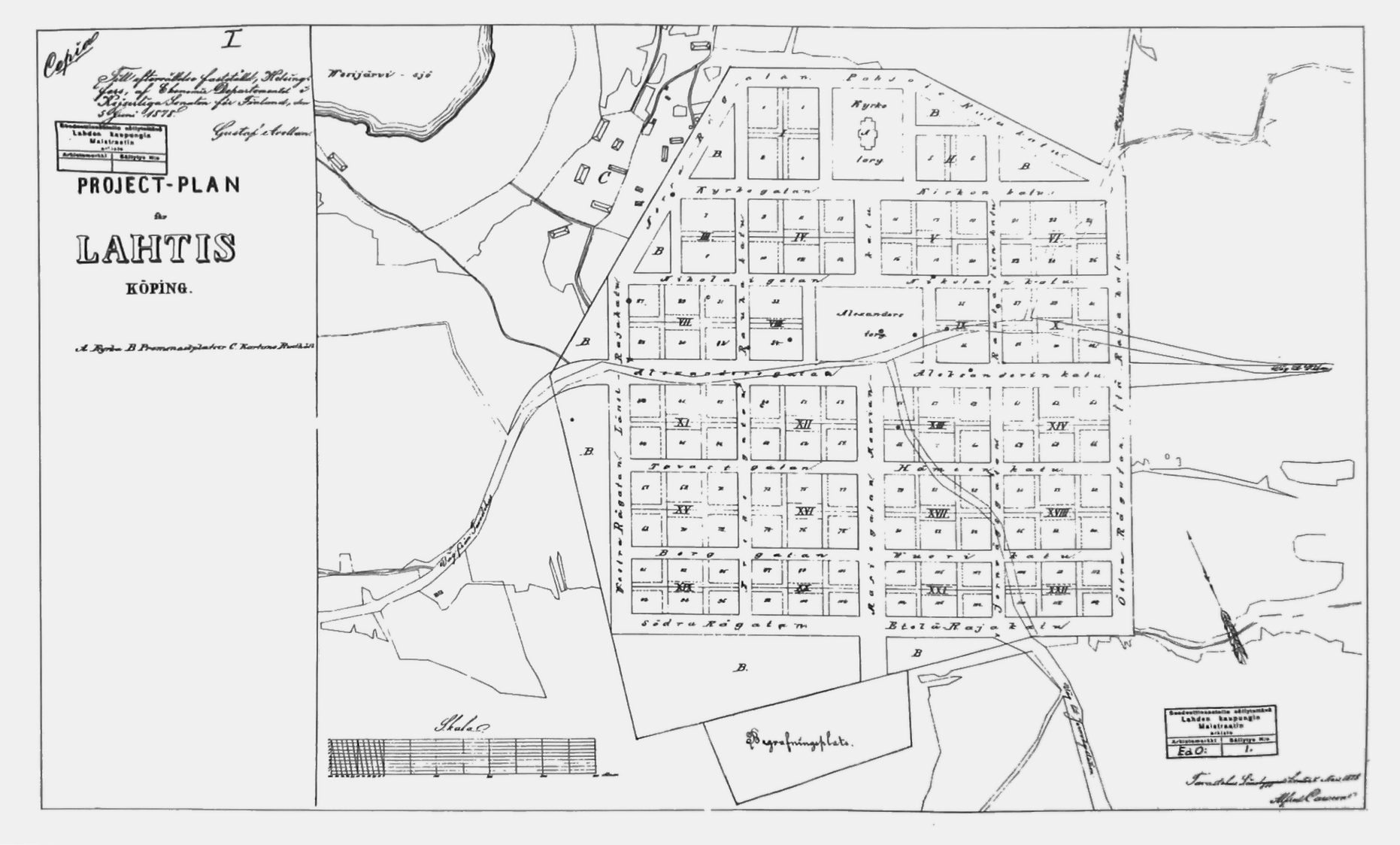
Lahti town plan from 1878 by Alfred Caween.

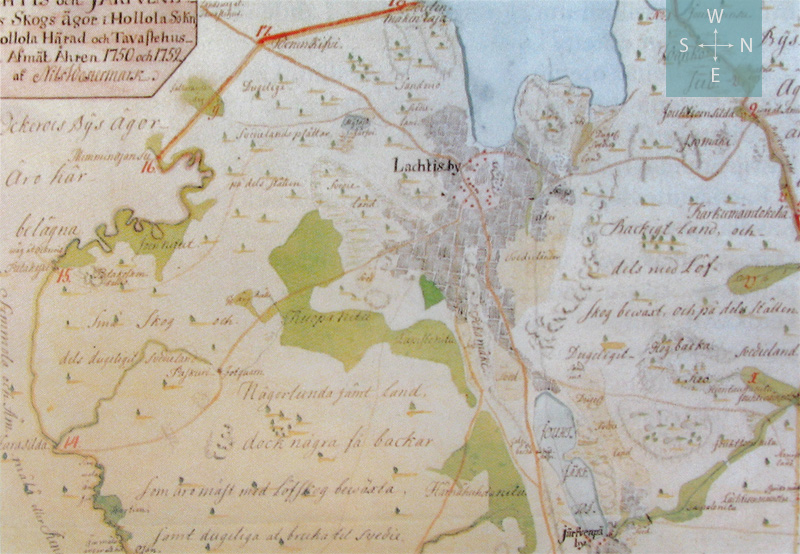
A map of Lahti made by Nils Westermark in 1750–52

The completion of the Riihimäki – St. Petersburg railway line in 1870 and the Vesijärvi canal in 1871 turned Lahti into a lively station, and industrial installations began to spring up around it. For a long time, the railway station at Vesijärvi Harbour was the second busiest station in Finland. Craftsmen, merchants, a few civil servants and a lot of industrial workers soon mixed in with the existing agricultural peasantry.

On 19 June 1877, almost the entire village was burned to the ground. However, the accident proved to be a stroke of luck for the development of the place, as it led to the authorities resuming their deliberations about establishing a town in Lahti. The village was granted market town rights by Emperor Alexander II of Russia in 1878 and an empire-style, grid town plan was approved, which included a large market square and wide boulevards. This grid plan still forms the basis of the city center. Most of the buildings were low wooden houses bordering the streets.

Lahti was founded during a period of severe economic recessions. The Russian Empire was encumbered by the war against Turkey, which also affected the economy of the Grand Duchy of Finland. The recession also slowed down building of the township: land would not sell and often plots were not built on for some time. In its early years, the town with its meagre 200 inhabitants was too small to provide any kind of foundation for trade. At the end of the 1890s, Lahti's Township Board increased its efforts to enable Lahti to be turned into a city. In spring 1904, the efforts finally bore fruit as the Senate approved of the application, although it was another eighteen months before Tsar Nicholas II finally gave his blessing and issued an ordinance for establishing the city of Lahti.

At the end of 1905, the area that now comprises Lahti accommodated around 8,200 people of whom just under 3,000 lived in the city itself. All essential municipal institutions were built in just ten years, including a hospital and a city hall. At the same time, a rapid increase in brick houses was taking place in the centre of the city. The Battle of Lahti was fought in the 1918 Finnish Civil War as the German Detachment Brandenstein took the town from the Reds.

In the early 1920s, the city gained possession of the grounds of the Lahti Manor, an important piece of land previously blocking the city from the lake. Large-scale industrial operations grew rapidly in the 1930s as did the population; Lahti, at the time, was one of Finland's fastest-growing cities, and before the start of the Winter War its population was approaching 30,000.

Through the addition of new areas in 1924, 1933 and 1956, Lahti grew, both in terms of population and surface area. The increase in population was especially strong after WWII, when 10,000 evacuees from ceded territories to the Soviet Union were settled in the city, and then later in the 1960s and 1970s as a result of urbanization. The rapid population growth came to a sharp end in 1975 and the city has since grown significantly slower albeit more steadily, with the latest notable growth in population happening in 2016 when the municipality of Nastola became a part of Lahti.

In December 2018, Lahti became the first new university city in Finland after Rovaniemi in 1979 when the Parliament accepted a change in the university law. LUT University nowadays consists of two campuses, Lappeenranta and Lahti.

== Geography ==
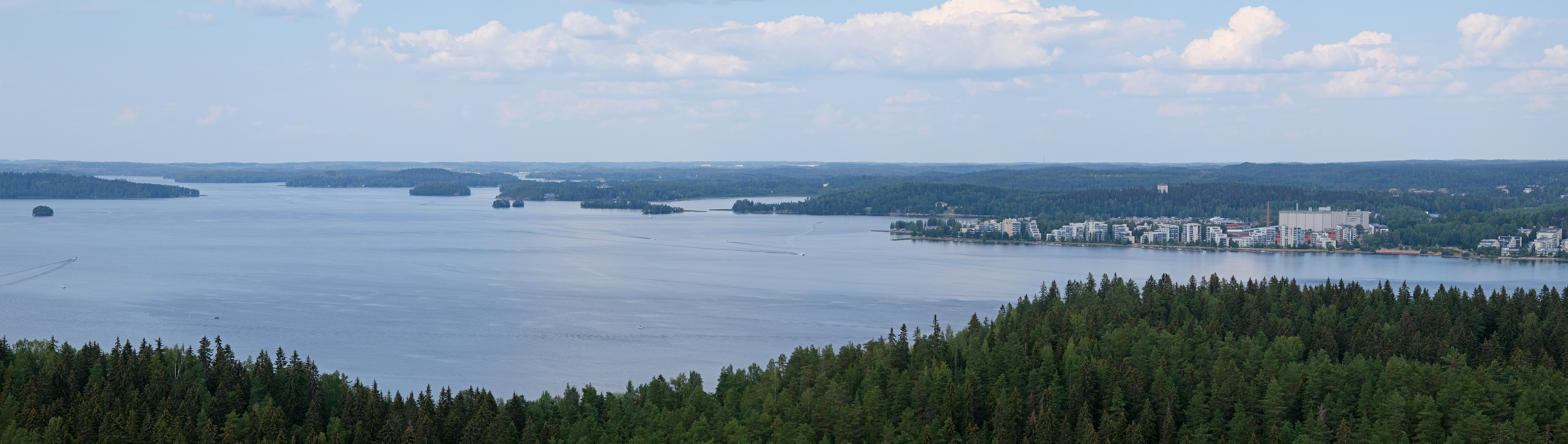
Lake Vesijärvi seen from Lahti

The terrain of Lahti is dominated by the first Salpausselkä ridge, a terminal moraine that cuts through the city from west to east. The city is located in the transition from the southern coastal area to the Finnish Lakeland; prominent to the north of the Salpausselkä are rocky hills and fragmented lakes, while its south side is dominated by forests and small rivers. The divide is also apparent in the soil, which mostly consists of till in the north and clay in the south. The biggest lake is Vesijärvi which also is a gateway to Central Finland via Lake Päijänne. There is also a pond called Pikku-Vesijärvi ("Little Vesijärvi") near the Lanu-puisto park.

=== Subdivisions ===
The area of the city of Lahti is divided in two ways: first, the 40 individually numbered districts (Finnish: kaupunginosa), and second, the 9 greater areas (Finnish: suuralue), which are divided into 41 statistical districts (Finnish: tilastollinen kaupunginosa) and further into 169 statistical areas (Finnish: tilastoalue). The definitions of the districts and statistical districts do not necessarily match each other. Below are listed the districts:

1. Keski-Lahti
2. Kartano
3. Paavola
4. Niemi
5. Kiveriö
6. Kivimaa
7. Mukkula
8. Kilpiäinen
9. Pesäkallio
10. Kytölä
11. Viuha
12. Kunnas
13. Ahtiala
14. Koiskala
15. Myllypohja
16. Möysä
17. Järvenpää
18. Kolava
19. Kujala
20. Kerinkallio
21. Ämmälä
22. Renkomäki
23. Nikkilä
24. Laune
25. Asemantausta
26. Sopenkorpi
27. Hennala
28. Jokimaa
29. Okeroinen
30. Kärpänen
31. Pirttiharju
32. Salpausselkä
33. Jalkaranta
34. Villähde
35. Nastola
36. Uusikylä
37. Seesta
38. Ruuhijärvi
39. Immilä
40. Pyhäntaka

=== Climate ===
Under the Köppen climate classification, Lahti has a humid continental climate (Dfb). Summers are usually warm in the city, with the average daily temperature in July exceeding over 23 °C (73.6 °F) and also having had the most 25 °C (77 °F) (or more) days in the last two decades, alongside Kouvola. Winters are cold and long but as a result of the climate change, specially winters are becoming more and more mild. During the heatwave of 2010, the temperature in Lahti reached 35.0 °C (95 °F). The amount of precipitation is fairly evenly distributed throughout the year. The driest season is spring, the most precipitation is in the second half of the year.

Climate data for Lahti Laune (1991–2020 normals, extremes 1938–05/2019 from Laune, 05/2019 -present from Sopenkorpi)
Month	Jan	Feb	Mar	Apr	May	Jun	Jul	Aug	Sep	Oct	Nov	Dec	Year
Record high °C (°F)	7.9 (46.2)	9.6 (49.3)	16.6 (61.9)	24.5 (76.1)	30.1 (86.2)	32.5 (90.5)	35.0 (95.0)	33.8 (92.8)	27.6 (81.7)	18.8 (65.8)	13.2 (55.8)	10.4 (50.7)	35.0 (95.0)
Mean maximum °C (°F)	3.7 (38.7)	4.0 (39.2)	9.6 (49.3)	18.3 (64.9)	25.0 (77.0)	27.4 (81.3)	28.5 (83.3)	27.3 (81.1)	21.7 (71.1)	14.5 (58.1)	8.6 (47.5)	4.8 (40.6)	29.7 (85.5)
Mean daily maximum °C (°F)	−3.0 (26.6)	−2.9 (26.8)	2.1 (35.8)	9.1 (48.4)	16.3 (61.3)	20.1 (68.2)	23.1 (73.6)	21.1 (70.0)	15.2 (59.4)	7.9 (46.2)	2.4 (36.3)	−0.9 (30.4)	9.2 (48.6)
Daily mean °C (°F)	−5.9 (21.4)	−6.3 (20.7)	−2.5 (27.5)	3.6 (38.5)	10.1 (50.2)	14.3 (57.7)	17.2 (63.0)	15.2 (59.4)	10.0 (50.0)	4.3 (39.7)	0.1 (32.2)	−3.4 (25.9)	4.7 (40.5)
Mean daily minimum °C (°F)	−9.1 (15.6)	−9.8 (14.4)	−6.8 (19.8)	−1.4 (29.5)	3.7 (38.7)	8.5 (47.3)	11.7 (53.1)	10.1 (50.2)	5.7 (42.3)	1.1 (34.0)	−2.3 (27.9)	−6.1 (21.0)	0.4 (32.8)
Mean minimum °C (°F)	−23.1 (−9.6)	−23.1 (−9.6)	−18.1 (−0.6)	−9.0 (15.8)	−3.5 (25.7)	1.7 (35.1)	5.8 (42.4)	3.5 (38.3)	−1.8 (28.8)	−7.8 (18.0)	−12.0 (10.4)	−18.3 (−0.9)	−26.6 (−15.9)
Record low °C (°F)	−40.6 (−41.1)	−35.6 (−32.1)	−31.4 (−24.5)	−19.3 (−2.7)	−7.0 (19.4)	−2.6 (27.3)	1.5 (34.7)	−2.0 (28.4)	−8.4 (16.9)	−16.5 (2.3)	−23.8 (−10.8)	−33.1 (−27.6)	−40.6 (−41.1)
Average precipitation mm (inches)	48.2 (1.90)	34.3 (1.35)	35.1 (1.38)	28.1 (1.11)	42.6 (1.68)	64.5 (2.54)	77.2 (3.04)	75.3 (2.96)	58.4 (2.30)	65.5 (2.58)	58.4 (2.30)	50.1 (1.97)	637.7 (25.11)
Average precipitation days (≥ 1 mm)	12.0	8.8	8.6	6.6	7.8	9.4	10.1	10.4	9.8	11.2	11.4	11.7	117.8
Average relative humidity (%)	90	87	80	71	66	70	74	79	85	88	91	91	81
Source 1: FMI climatological normals for Finland 1991–2020
Source 2: record highs and lows 1961– present FMI(record highs and lows 1938–1961)

== Demographics ==
=== Population ===
Historical population
Year	Pop.	±%
1878	200	—
1910	5,081	+2440.5%
1920	7,200	+41.7%
1930	10,868	+50.9%
1940	27,878	+156.5%
1950	44,759	+60.6%
1960	66,802	+49.2%
1970	88,393	+32.3%

The city of Lahti has 121,832 inhabitants, making it the 9th most populous municipality in Finland. The Lahti region has 204,522 inhabitants, making it the fifth largest region in Finland after Helsinki, Tampere, Turku and Oulu. Lahti is home to 2% of Finland's population. 11% of the population has a foreign background, which is close to the national average. However, it is lower than in the major Finnish cities of Helsinki, Espoo, Tampere, Vantaa or Turku.

Population size 1980–2025
Year	Population
1980	108,631
1985	108,919
1990	108,272
1995	110,038
2000	111,656
2005	113,582
2010	116,582
2015	118,743
2020	119,917
2025	121,832

=== Languages ===
Population by
mother tongue (2025)
1. Finnish (88.5%)
2. Russian (2.80%)
3. Arabic (1.10%)
4. Ukrainian (1.00%)
5. Estonian (0.70%)
6. Kurdish (0.70%)
7. English (0.50%)
8. Other (4.70%)

Lahti is a monolingual Finnish-speaking municipality. The majority of the population, 107,782 persons (88.5%), spoke Finnish as their first language. In addition, the number of Swedish speakers was 568 persons (0.5%) of the population. Foreign languages were spoken by 11% of the population. As English and Swedish are compulsory school subjects, functional bilingualism or trilingualism acquired through language studies is not uncommon.

At least 100 different languages are spoken in Lahti. The most commonly spoken foreign languages are Russian (2.8%), Arabic (1.1%), Ukrainian (1.0%), Estonian (0.7%), Kurdish (0.7%) and English (0.5%).

=== Immigration ===
Population by country of birth (2025)
Country of birth	Population	%
Finland	108,816	89.3
Soviet Union	2,733	2.2
Estonia	895	0.7
Ukraine	724	0.6
Iraq	712	0.6
Russia	663	0.5
Syria	607	0.5
Sweden	553	0.5
China	496	0.4
Thailand	370	0.3
Other	4,983	4.1

As of 2024, there were 12,841 persons with a migrant background living in Lahti, or 11% of the population. (Note: Statistics Finland classifies a person as having a "foreign background" if both parents or the only known parent were born abroad.) The number of residents who were born abroad was 12,146, or 10 per cent of the population. The number of persons with foreign citizenship living in Lahti was 8,268. Most foreign-born citizens came from the former Soviet Union, Estonia, Iraq, Russia and Ukraine.

The relative share of immigrants in Lahti's population is close to the national average. Furthermore, the city's new residents are increasingly of foreign origin. This will increase the proportion of foreign residents in the coming years.

=== Religion ===
In 2023, the Evangelical Lutheran Church was the largest religious group with 60.6% of the population of Lahti. Other religious groups accounted for 2.9% of the population. 36.5% of the population had no religious affiliation.

== Economy ==
The economic region of Lahti, which includes the surrounding municipalities, was strongly affected by the collapse of Finnish-Soviet trade and by the recession in the early 1990s. The value of production slumped, especially in the mechanical engineering industry and other manufacturing industries (e.g. the furniture industry). Production also decreased in the textile and clothing industry. In 1990, there were 90,370 jobs in the Lahti region. The number of jobs diminished over the next couple of years, so that in 1993 there were fewer than 70,000 jobs in the region. The number of jobs had slowly increased to 79,138 in 1999.

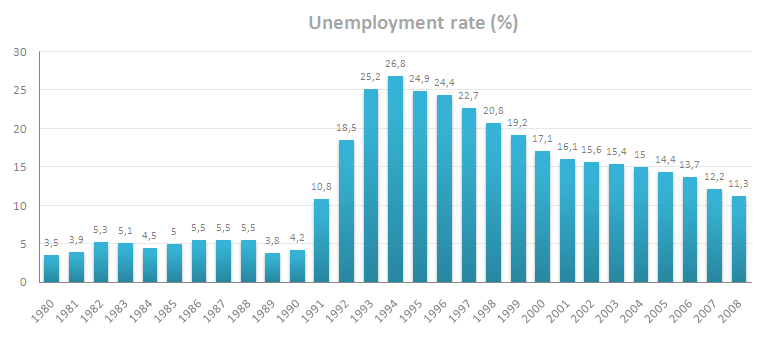

Employment by sector (City of Lahti)	1980	1990	2000	2007
Services	52.0%	59.3%	63.5%	72.4%
Industry	47.1%	40.1%	36.4%	27.4%
Agriculture & Forestry	0.9%	0.6%	0.1%	0.2%

In 1995, R&D expenditure was FIM 715 per person, while Finland's average was about FIM 2050. The amount of Tekes (the National Technology Agency) funding in the Lahti Region grew 40% during 2004–2007 while the average growth in Finland was 60%.

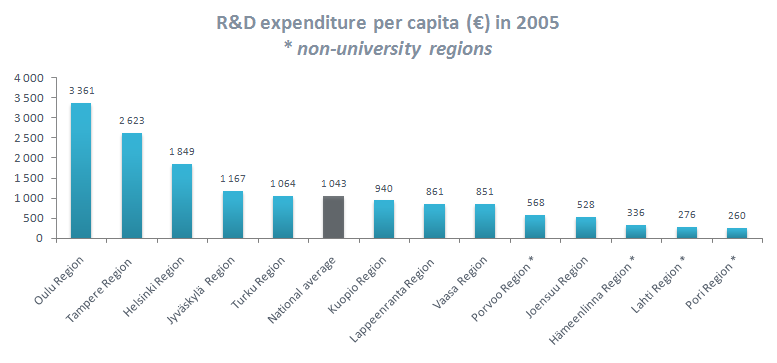

Gross domestic product (Lahti Region)	2000	2001	2002	2003	2004	2005	2006
GDP at current prices; million €	3,449.3	3,709.7	3,697.5	3,982.3	4,136.8	4,242.4	4,381.9
Changes of GDP; year 2000 = 100%	100.0%	107.5%	107.2%	115.5%	119.9%	123.0%	127.7%
GDP per capita; whole country =100%	80.7%	82.0%	79.4%	84.3%	83.9%	83.4%	81.2%
GDP per employed; whole country =100%	86.6%	87.3%	83.6%	88.9%	88.7%	88.6%	87.1%

== Culture ==
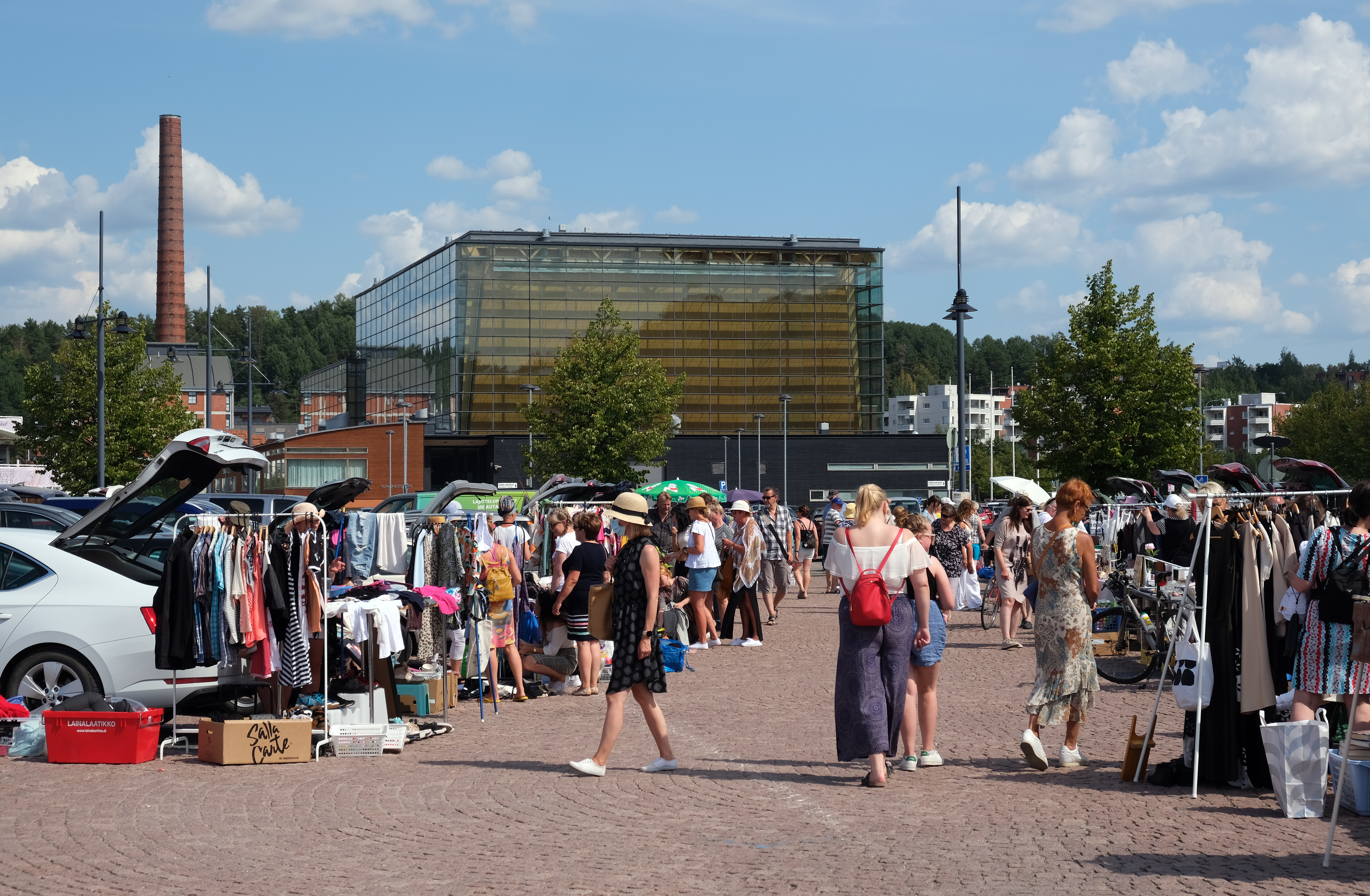
Flea market in the Lahti harbour, Sibelius Hall in the background.

Lahti harbors cultural ambitions, manifested notably in the construction of a large congress and concert centre, the Sibelius Hall (2000) by architects Kimmo Lintula and Hannu Tikka. Lahti has one of Finland's most widely known symphony orchestras, the Lahti Symphony Orchestra (Sinfonia Lahti ), based at the Sibelius Hall, which performs both classical and popular music, notably concentrating on music by Jean Sibelius. The orchestra has won several well respected international prizes, and is often heard on BBC Radio 3.

Lahti's annual music festival programme includes such events as Lahti Organ Festival, a jazz festival held in the city's market square and the Sibelius Festival.

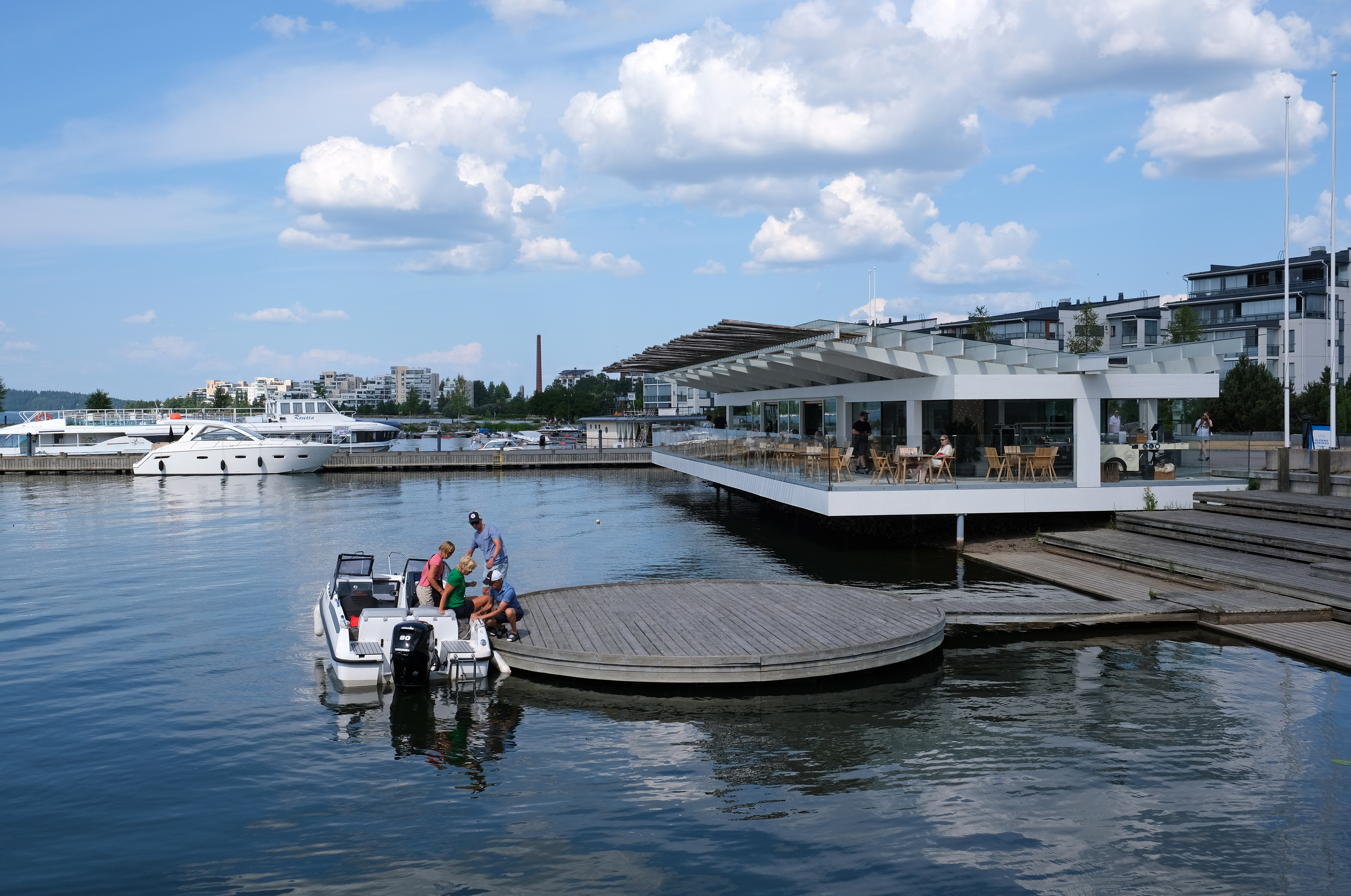
Piano Pavilion in Lahti harbour

In addition to the Sibelius Hall, other additional notable works of architecture in Lahti are the City Hall (1911) by Eliel Saarinen, the Church of the Cross (1978) by Alvar Aalto, Nastola Church (1804), the oldest church in the city, Joutjärvi church, the City Theatre (1983) by Pekka Salminen, the City Library (1990) by Arto Sipinen, the Piano Pavilion (2008) by Gert Wingårdh, and the Travel Centre (2016) by JKMM Architects. The City of Lahti has also acted as the host city for the international Spirit of Wood Architecture Award, established in Finland in 1999. Some of the prize-winners have received commissions to design small structures in the city; these include small works by Japanese architect Kengo Kuma and Australian architect Richard Leplastrier.

The Finnish folk metal band Korpiklaani was founded in Lahti.

=== Museums and galleries ===
- Lahti Ski Museum
- Historical Museum of Lahti
- Lahti Art Museum
- Poster museum
- Radio and TV Museum
- Finland's Motorcycle Museum
- The Museum of Military Medicine
- Taarasti Art Center

== Sports ==
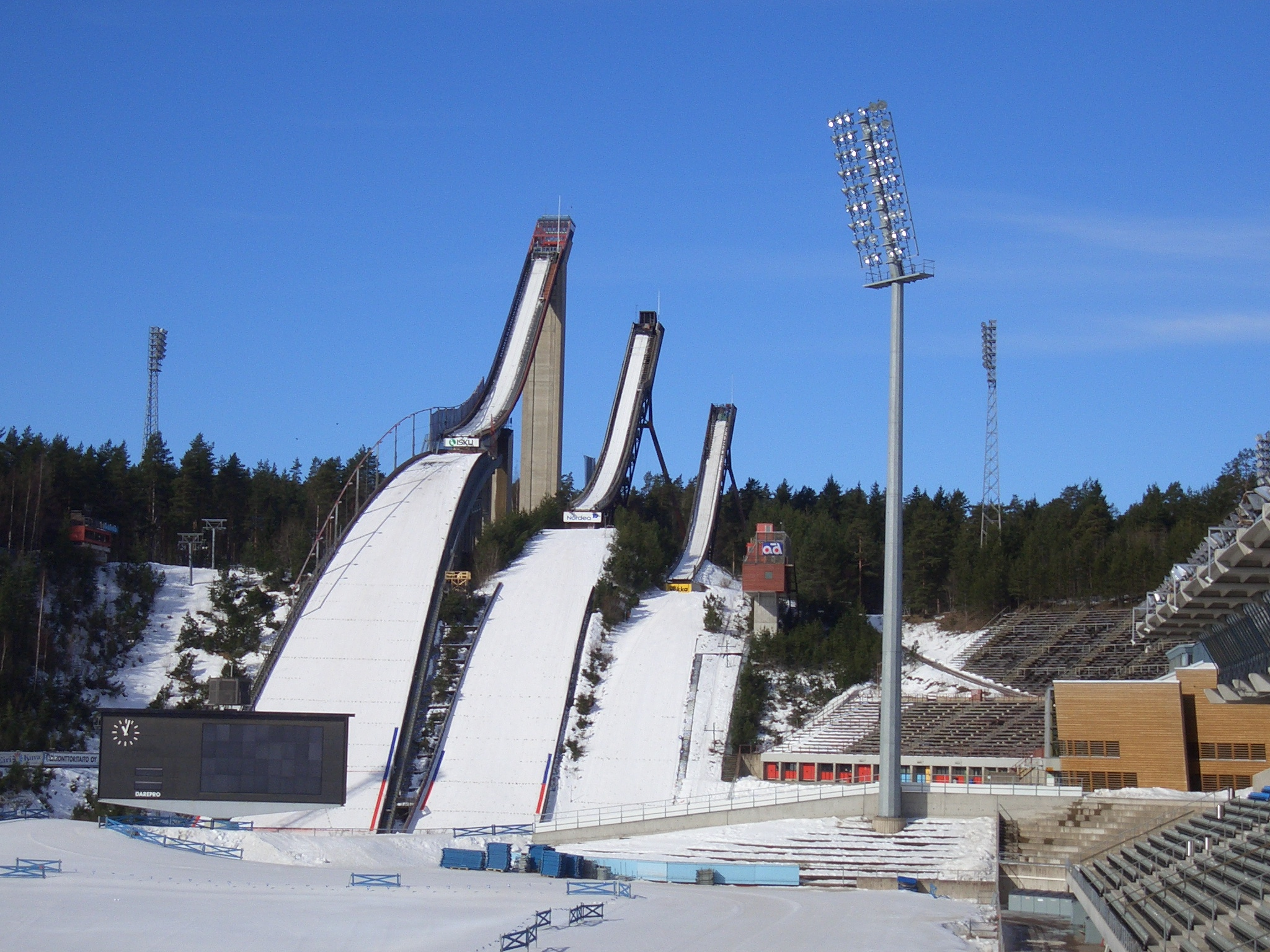
Ski jumps at the sports centre

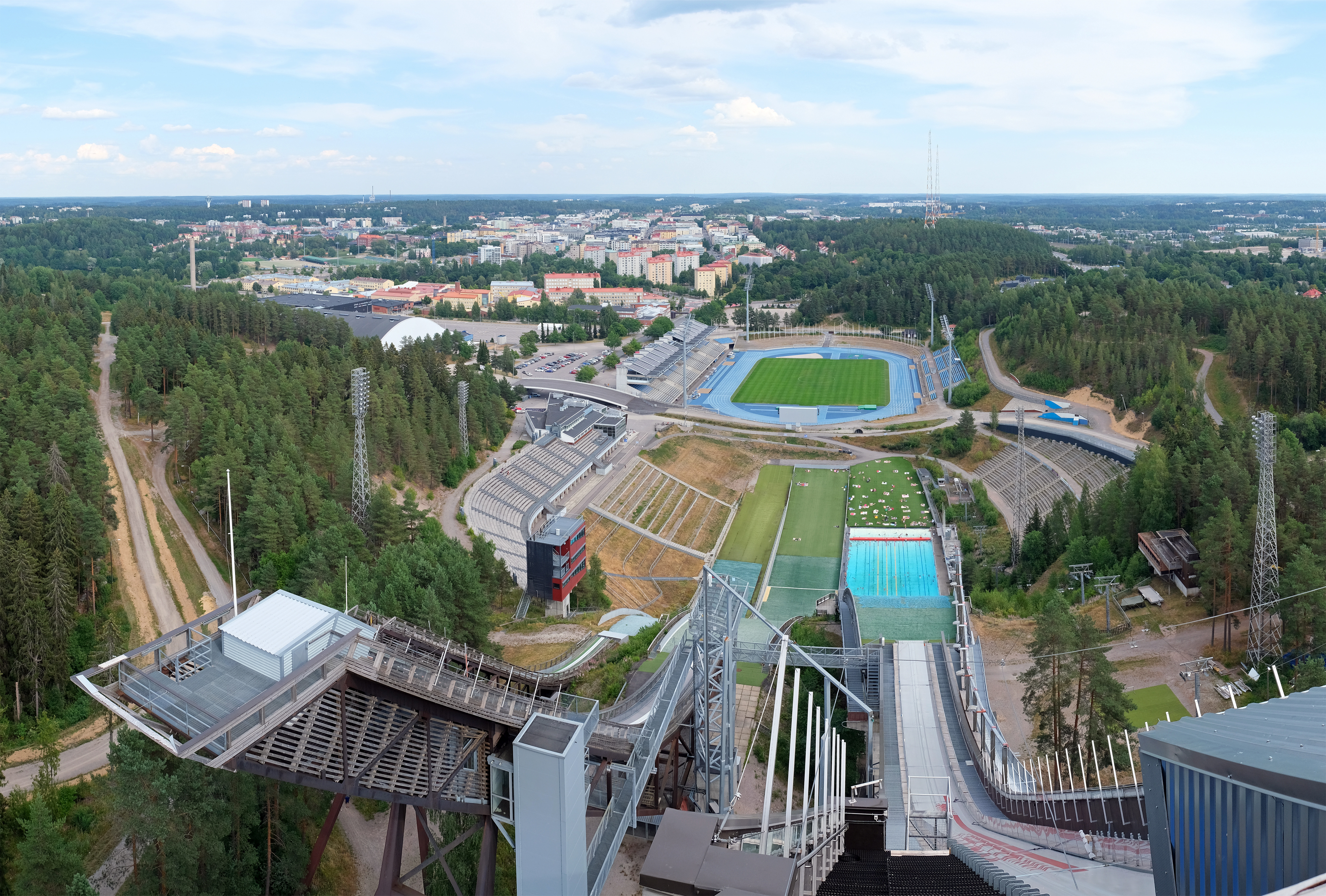
Lahti Sports Center: the ski jumping hills, Hiihtostadium and public outdoor swimming pool.

=== Winter sports ===
Lahti has a rich sporting tradition, especially in various wintersports. The city is well known for the annually held Lahti Ski Games (Salpausselän kisat) and the Finlandia-hiihto cross-country skiing contest. It is also the only city to host the FIS Nordic World Ski Championships seven times, doing so in 1926, 1938, 1958, 1978, 1989, 2001 and 2017.

=== Ice hockey ===
The Pelicans have competed in the top level of Finnish ice hockey, the SM-liiga, since 1999. Before the new millennium Reipas represented Lahti in top-flight hockey for 50 years. Many former NHL players, such as Janne Laukkanen, Toni Lydman and Pasi Nurminen, have started their careers in Reipas.

=== Association football ===
Historically the city's most successful association football club has been Kuusysi. In their golden years lasting from the early 1980s to the 1990s they won five Finnish championships as well as two Finnish Cup titles, with appearances in European competitions each year. Their greatest rivals, Reipas, won a total of three championships and seven cup titles from 1963 to 1978 but diminished in the early 1980s as Kuusysi got stronger.

In the 1990s both clubs ended up in such massive financial difficulties that a merger was executed in 1996, with the newly formed club adopting a new name, crest and colours. FC Lahti has played in the Veikkausliiga since 1999, excluding a season-long visit to the first division in 2011, having placed twice third and appearing in Europe three times.

=== Other events ===
The Kärpänen motorcycle speedway track existed from circa.1950 to circa.1980, it was located where the Kärpäsen koulu sports field is today and hosted a qualifying round of the Speedway World Championship in 1957 in addition to the Finnish Speedway Championship, multiple times between the years 1963 and 1978. Another former speedway track at Pipo (built in 1980), off the Vanhanradankatu held the final of the Finnish Championship in 1980, 1987 and 1990.

The 1997 World Games and the 2009 World Masters Athletics Championships were held in Lahti. For the 1952 Summer Olympics, some of the football matches were played at Kisapuisto.

Lahti hosted the 2023 Ironman 70.3 World Championship on August 26–27, an annual event which rotates venue and is the 2nd most important event in long course triathlon after Kona World Championship held annually in Hawaii.

== Transportation ==
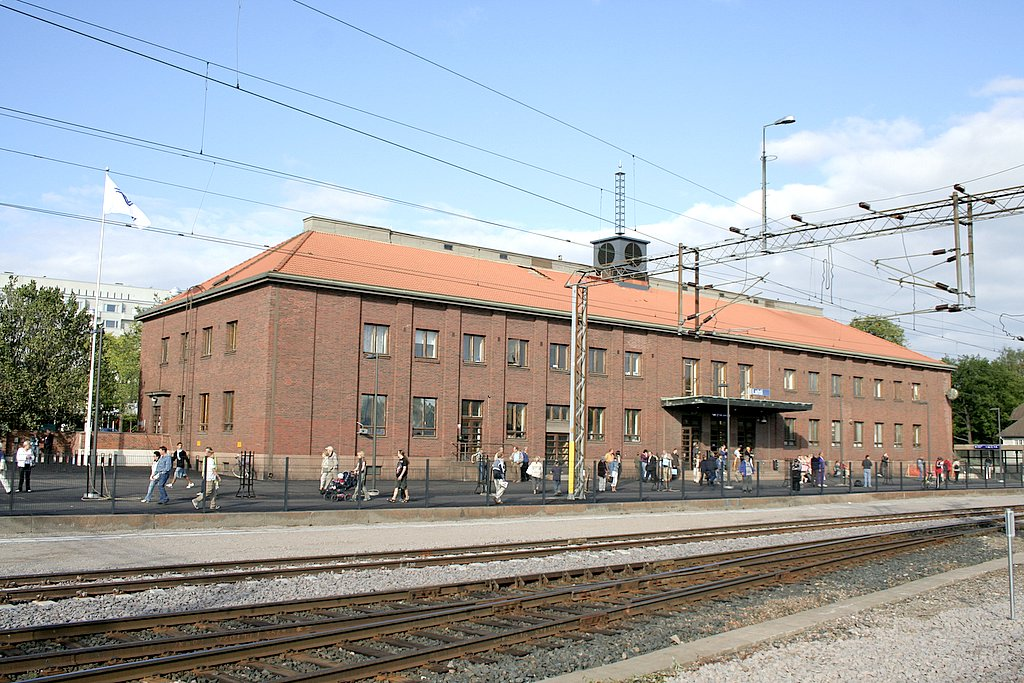
Railway station, built in 1935 and designed by architect Thure Hellström.

=== Local transport ===
The city is served by 20 local bus lines, most of which are pendulum lines between two different areas via city centre. Bus transport in the Päijät-Häme region is organised by the regional transportation authority, known as Lahden seudun liikenne or LSL, and run by several private companies which have bid for the right to run their lines. LSL buses cover all urban areas at 10–20 minute intervals and most nearby municipalities at 30–60 minute intervals.

Lahti is served by VR commuter rail, the Z train to Helsinki and the G train to Riihimäki run hourly. Most services to Kouvola don't have a letter designation and are run every three hours aside from rush hours. There are plans for building two new train stops inside the city limits before 2020, Hennala and Karisto. A local service to Heinola has been proposed but renovating the old line has been deemed too expensive and unprofitable in the long term, unless the Finnish state reaches an agreement with regional councils to finance a direct rail link from Lahti to either Jyväskylä or Mikkeli.

=== Long-distance transport ===
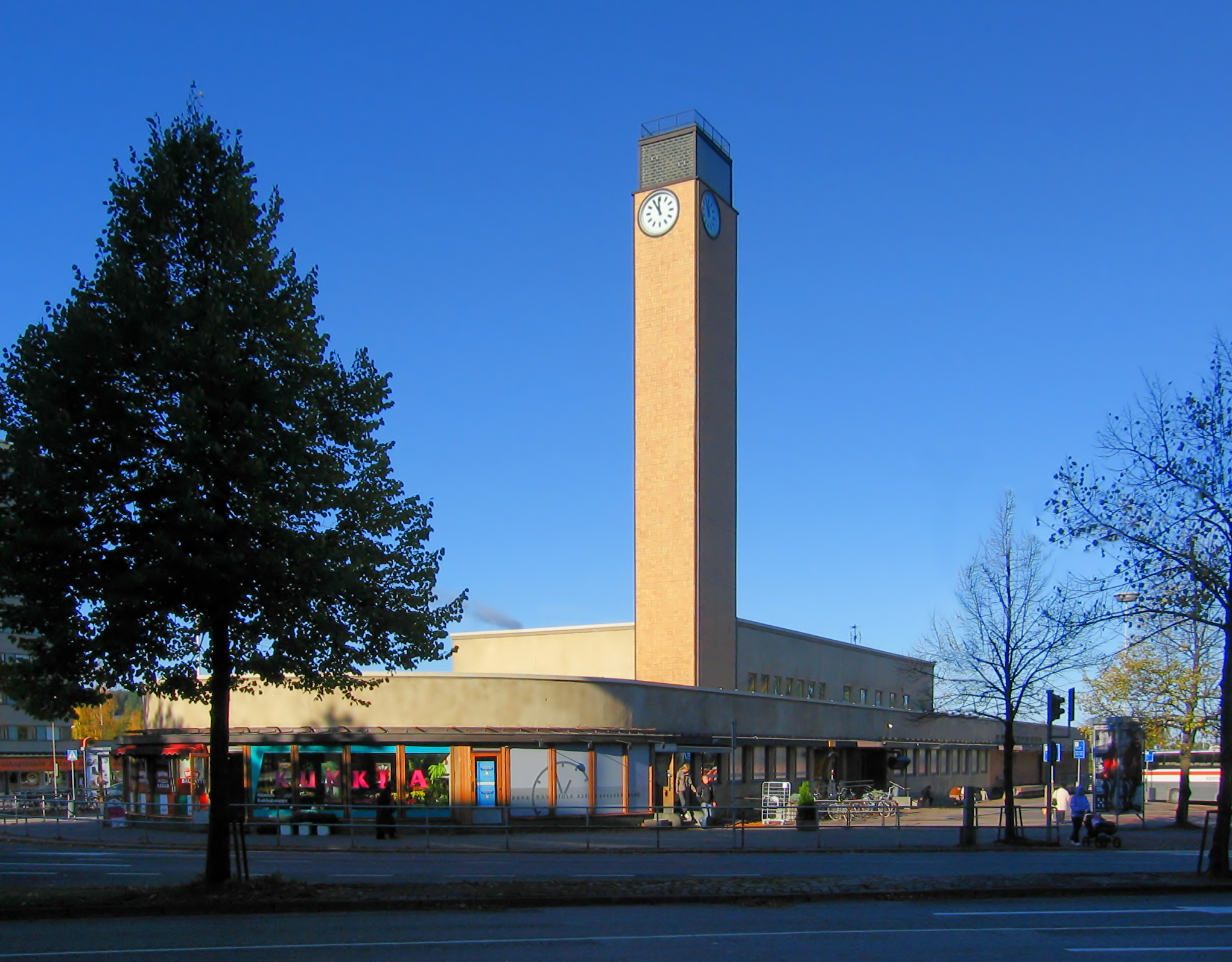
Bus station, built in 1939 and designed by architect Kaarlo Könönen.

The city's main transportation hubs are the market square (Kauppatori) and the travel centre (Matkakeskus), with local buses providing a non-stop service between the two. The travel centre, which replaced the old Lahti bus station that had been in use since 1939, was built between 2014 and 2016 around the Lahti railway station by building new local bus stops around the station, a long-distance bus terminal next to the station building and an automated parking facility for commuters.

All local and long-distance trains and buses stop at the travel centre, making it convenient to transfer from one mode of transport to another. The city council has sold the old bus station in the city centre and it will be redeveloped for other uses in the near future.

Lahti's proximity to Helsinki provides a fast and well-serviced operation between the cities. Long-distance and commuter trains service the city at least twice an hour in the daytime. There is also a commuter train service towards Riihimäki in the south-west and to Kouvola / Kotka in the east. All the east and north-east long-distance train services to and from Helsinki railway station call at Lahti. From Lahti, it is also convenient to travel to Helsinki airport. Travel time to Helsinki airport via Tikkurila station is between 49min to 65min.

Additionally to the train connections, the long-distance busses are well-serviced in Lahti. Thanks to its geographical location, Lahti provides a hub-like possibility for busses too. From Lahti, the long-distance busses service routes to Helsinki, Turku, Tampere, Jyväskylä, Mikkeli, Oulu, Rovaniemi amongst the other destinations.

== Education ==
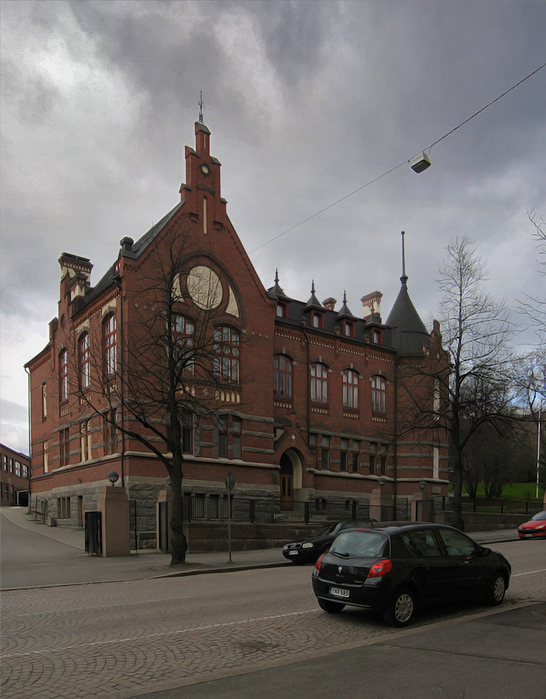
Lahden yhteiskoulu from 1896

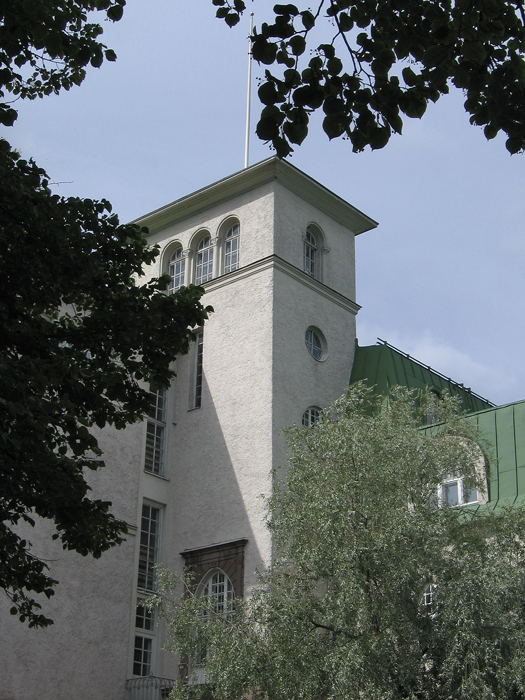
Lahti Folk High School

=== Comprehensive and private education ===
Lahti has 16 comprehensive schools and eight secondary schools. Comprehensive education is also available in English and Swedish. Lahden yhteiskoulu is the city's only private school offering both comprehensive and upper secondary education.

=== Upper secondary and vocational education ===
All four upper secondary schools in Lahti have a specialty: the Lyceum has expertise on subjects such as mathematics and biology, and sports (formerly in Salpauselkä), Tiirismaa focuses on music in association with the Lahti Conservatory, Kannas organises theatre classes and Lahden yhteiskoulu offers an economy-centered class. In 2022, Tiirismaa and Kannas merged to form Gaudia which is currently the largest upper secondary school in Finland with 1350 students.

Salpaus is an educational consortium owned by the municipalities in Päijät-Häme arranging most of the region's vocational education and trade schooling. The privately owned Dila and Lahti Conservatory educate students for healthcare and music-related professions, respectively.

=== Higher education and LUT University ===
Some of Lahti's educational assets are the Lappeenranta-Lahti University of Technology LUT as well as also highly regarded Institute of Design and Fine Arts, which is a part of LAB University of Applied Sciences.

LUT University offers education in engineering science as well as in business and management. The Institute of Design and Fine Arts has gained international recognition in particular for jewelry and industrial design, while other areas of expertise include metal, woodworking and furniture.

There are two national sports institutes in greater Lahti. The Vierumäki International Sports Institute based in Heinola is the most versatile centre of sports and physical education in the country, operating under the Ministry of Culture and Education. In addition the Pajulahti Sports Institute, located in the district of Nastola in Lahti, is one of the leading sports and training centres in Finland.

Furthermore one of Finland's six multidisciplinary university campuses is based in Lahti. The University of Helsinki's Department of Environmental Sciences is the university's sole science department located outside the Helsinki metropolitan area.

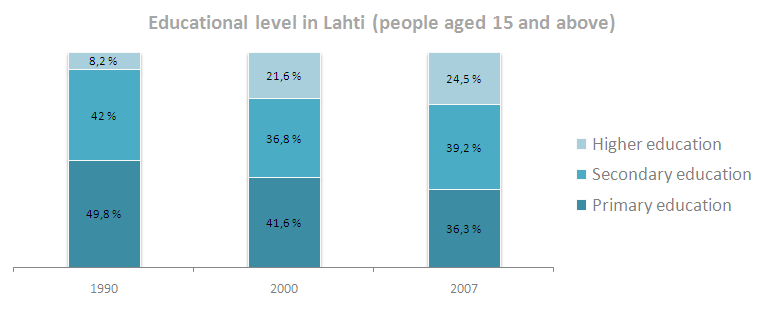

== Trivia ==
The asteroid 1498 Lahti was named after the city by its discoverer, the Finnish astronomer Yrjö Väisälä.

The radio masts on top of the Radiomäki are 150 metres (490 ft) tall.

Lahti won the European Green Capital Award of the year 2021. In 2020, National Geographic selected Lahti as one of the five most forward-looking cities in Europe for its sustainable urban development and environmental initiatives.

Although the Institute for the Languages of Finland recommend for Norway and Denmark to use the Swedish names for all Finnish towns, the use of Lahtis in those countries is almost non-existent even among major newssites, especially as a result of Lahti being the branding name used for skiing events held there.

== Notable people from Lahti ==
- Janne Ahonen, ski jumper
- Risto Ahti, writer
- Valtteri Bottas, Formula One driver
- Georg C. Ehrnrooth, politician and lawyer
- Kai Haaskivi, football player
- Aksu Hanttu, drummer of Entwine
- Mikko Ilonen, professional golfer
- Ilona Jokinen, soprano opera singer
- Tommi Kautonen, football player
- Eija-Riitta Korhola, politician
- Pekka Lagerblom, football player
- Jari Litmanen, football player
- Toni Lydman, former NHL player
- Marjaana Maijala, actress
- Tapio Mäkelä, cross-country skier
- Toni Nieminen, ski jumper
- Pasi Nurminen, former NHL goaltender
- Sami Pajari, rally driver
- Petri Pasanen, football player
- Jaana Pelkonen, politician and hostess of Eurovision Song Contest 2007
- Tuomas Peltonen, football goalkeeper
- Ulla Puolanne, politician
- Sipe Santapukki, musician
- Iiro Sopanen, professional ice hockey player
- Jimi Tenor, musician
- Alina Voronkova, model and beauty pageant titleholder who won Miss Finland 2018

== International relations ==
=== Twin towns—sister cities ===
Lahti is twinned with:

- Västerås, Sweden (since 1940)
- Akureyri, Iceland (since 1947)
- Randers, Denmark (since 1947)
- Ålesund, Norway (since 1947)
- Zaporizhzhya, Ukraine (since 1953)
- Pécs, Hungary (since 1956)
- Garmisch-Partenkirchen, Germany (since 1987)
- Suhl, Germany (since 1988)
- Kaluga, Russia (since 1994)
- Narva, Estonia (since 1994, partnership agreement)
- Deyang, Sichuan, China (since 2000)
- Wuxi, Jiangsu, China (since 2011)
- Norberg, Sweden
- Tamsalu, Estonia

== See also ==
- Hollola
- Lahti Highway
- Lahti Summit
- Launeen keskuspuisto
- Nastola
