= Archipelago Museum =

Marine museum in Loviisa, Finland

- Rönnäs-museum
- Established: 1985
- Location: Rönnäs, Loviisa, Finland
- Coordinates: 60.3637749°N 26.0486752°E
- Key holdings: Traditional peasant boats
- Collections: Marine engines

The Archipelago Museum (or Rönnäs-museum) in Rönnäs, Loviisa in Finland, is dedicated to coastal areas and the archipelagos and their specific life. It is run by a local trust from the start in 1985. The museum holds one of Finland's largest collections of traditional peasant boats.

The basic exhibition located in the basement of the main building, stresses the impact of human life in the nature of the archipelagos by describing the initial colonization of the barren areas, as well as of the introduction of agrarian occupation. The exhibition showcases maritime occupations such as seal hunting, fishery and seabird hunting, as well as coastal navigation and pilotage. The upper floor of the main building presents an exhibition of wooden boats and boat building.

== Exhibitions ==
In addition to permanent exhibitions, the museum annually presents a selected theme connected to the maritime culture. The museum trust also publishes a journal on archaeology and ethnology of boats.
