= Tesjoki =

Settlement in Finland

Coordinates: 60°28′22″N 26°18′15″E

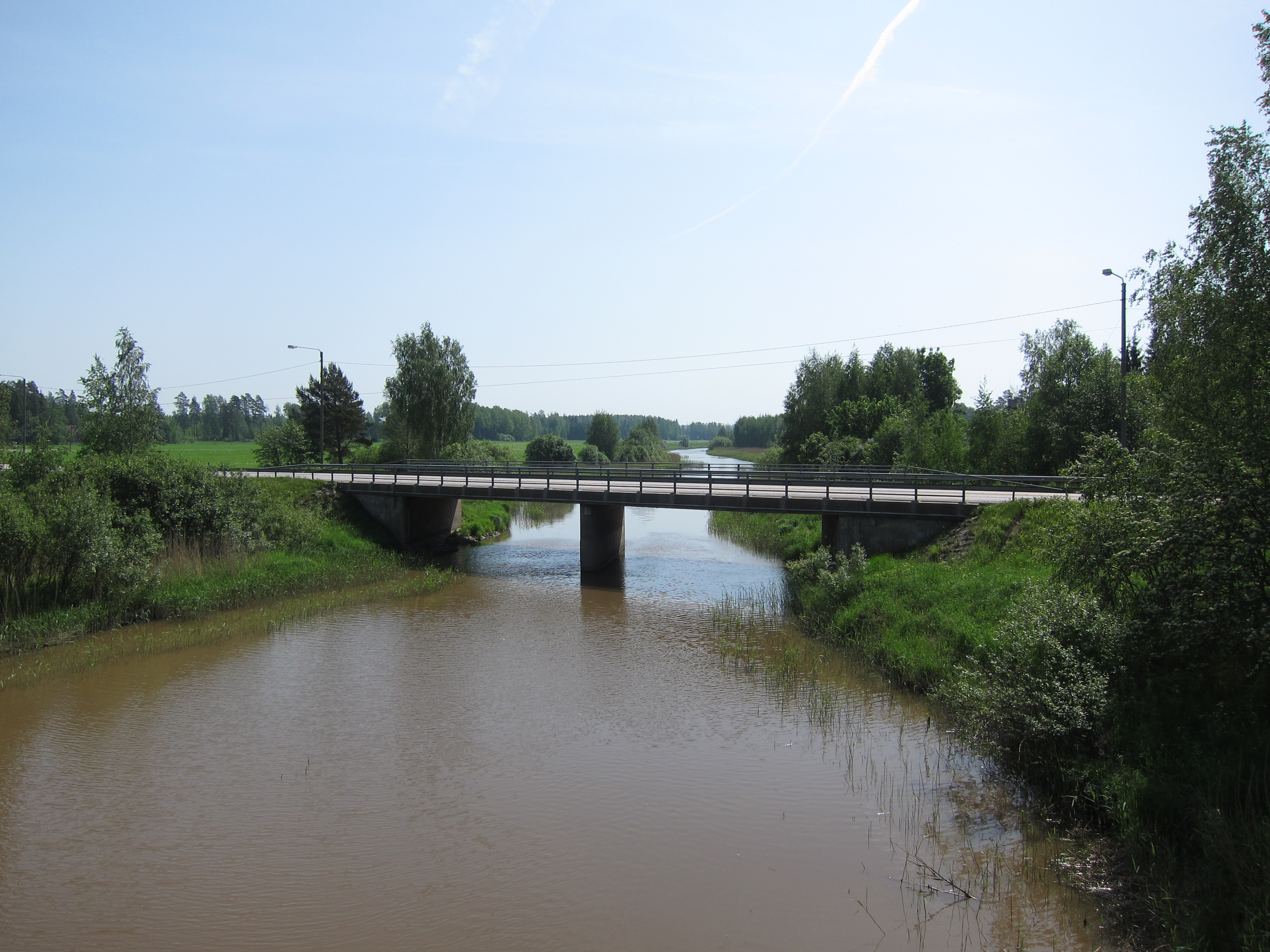

Tesjoki (Swedish: Tessjö) is a village in Loviisa municipality, Uusimaa, Finland. There are two schools in the village, one with education in Finnish and one where Swedish is the main language. Tesjoki is divided to the following smaller localities: Kvarnby, Marby. and Torparbacken.
