= Loviisa =

Town in Uusimaa, Finland

Loviisa Loviisa (Finnish) Lovisa (Swedish)
- Town
- Loviisan kaupunki Lovisa stad
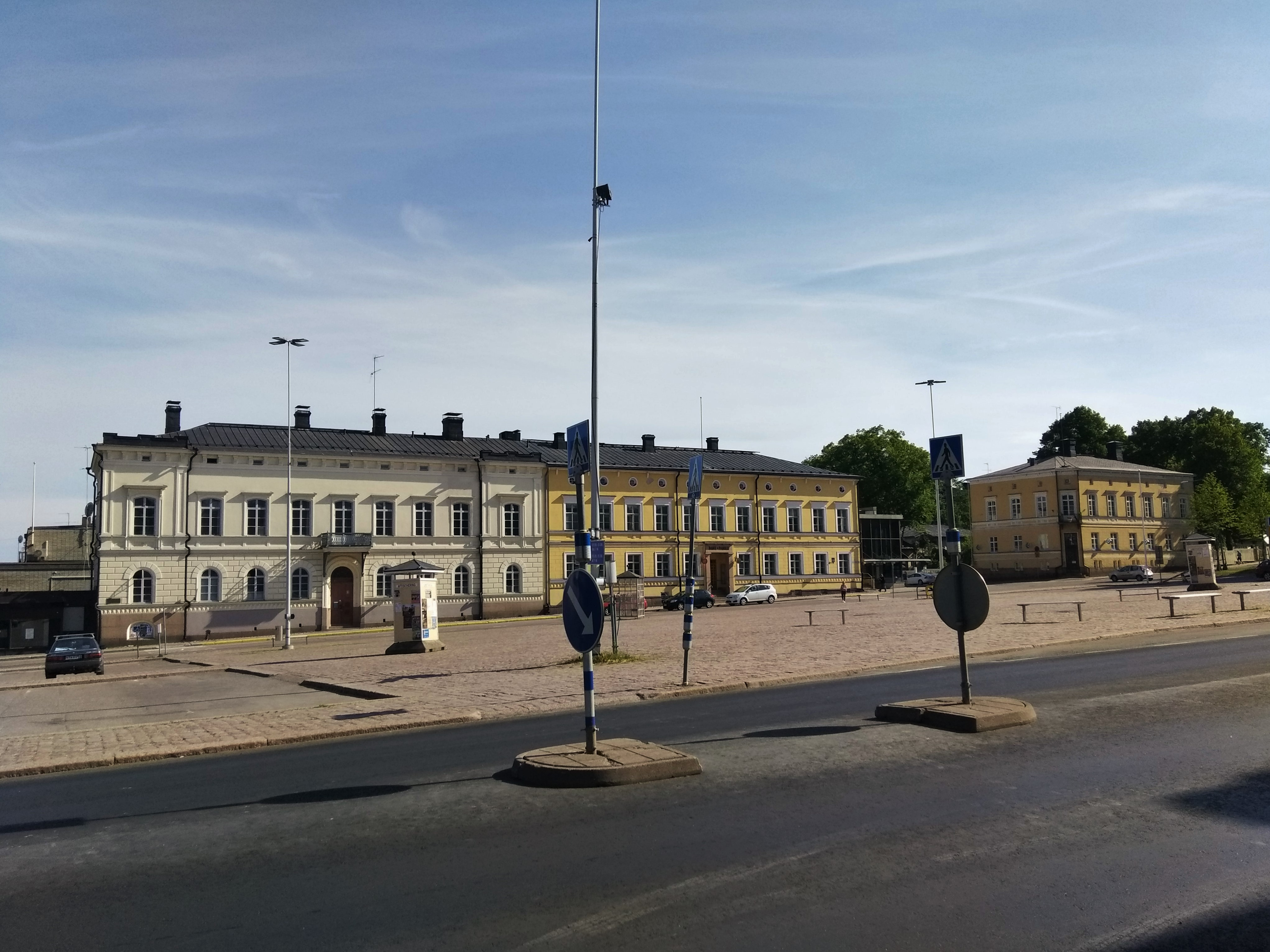
- Loviisa townhall Square

- Coat of arms

- Location of Loviisa in Finland
- Interactive map of Loviisa
- Coordinates: 60°27.5′N 026°14′E
- Country: Finland
- Region: Uusimaa
- Sub-region: Loviisa
- Charter: 1745
- Named for: Louisa Ulrika of Prussia

Government
  - Town manager: Tomas Björkroth

Area (2018-01-01)
  - Total: 1,751.52 km^{2} (676.27 sq mi)
  - Land: 819.82 km^{2} (316.53 sq mi)
  - Water: 931.92 km^{2} (359.82 sq mi)
  - Rank: 95th largest in Finland

Population (2025-12-31)
  - Total: 14,196
  - Rank: 78th largest in Finland
  - Density: 17.32/km^{2} (44.9/sq mi)

Population by native language
  - Finnish: 55.3% (official)
  - Swedish: 38.7% (official)
  - Others: 6.1%

Population by age
  - 0 to 14: 13.5%
  - 15 to 64: 57%
  - 65 or older: 29.5%
- Time zone: UTC+02:00 (EET)
  - Summer (DST): UTC+03:00 (EEST)
- Postal code: 07900
- Area code: 019
- Climate: Dfb
- Website: www.loviisa.fi/en/

Loviisa (Finnish: [ˈloʋiːsɑ]; Swedish: Lovisa [luˈviːsɑ]; formerly Degerby) is a town in Finland, located on the southern coast of the country. Loviisa is situated in the eastern part of the Uusimaa region. The population of Loviisa is approximately 14,000, while the sub-region has a population of approximately 17,000. It is the 78th most populous municipality in Finland.

Loviisa is located 90 kilometres (56 mi) from Helsinki and 38 kilometres (24 mi) from Porvoo. The municipality covers an area of 1,751.52 square kilometres (676.27 sq mi) of which 931.92 km^{2} (359.82 sq mi) is water. The population density is 17.32 inhabitants per square kilometre (44.9/sq mi).

The neighboring municipalities of Liljendal, Pernå and Ruotsinpyhtää were consolidated with Loviisa on 1 January 2010.

Loviisa is a bilingual municipality with Finnish and Swedish as its official languages. The population consists of 55% Finnish speakers, 39% Swedish speakers, and 6% speakers of other languages.

Loviisa was founded in 1745, as a border fortress against Russia. Most of the fortifications have been preserved. Loviisa was originally called Degerby, but king Adolf Frederick of Sweden renamed the city after his spouse Lovisa Ulrika after visiting the town in 1752.

Loviisa is the site of two of Finland's nuclear reactors, two VVER units each of 488 MWe, at the Loviisa Nuclear Power Plant. The other operating reactors are at the Olkiluoto Nuclear Power Plant.

== History ==
=== 18th century ===
The town of Degerby was founded on the grounds of the Degerby horse stable in Pernå in 1745 as a frontier and fortress town. Eastern Finland needed a new staple town because the eastern border had shifted in the 1743 Treaty of Åbo. The only staple town in eastern Finland, Hamina, was left beyond the border. King Adolf Frederick of Sweden visited Degerby in 1752 and renamed the town as Loviisa after his wife, Queen Louisa Ulrika of Prussia. The first mayor of Loviisa from 1747 to 1765 was Jacob af Forselles, who had fled from Hamina and bought the Petjärvi (Strömfors) ironworks together with Anders Nohrström.

In 1748 construction of the Loviisa fortress started, but it soon ground to a halt because of financial difficulties in the kingdom of Sweden. Only part of the outer battlements were constructed. The bastions Rosen and Ungern to the east of the current city centre serve as reminders of the history of the fortress town. The Svartholm fortress to the south of the town was built at the same time as the Loviisa fortress. This marine fortress was meant to protect the town from the seaside and provide a safe harbour for the coastal fleet of Sweden. The Swedish era in Svartholm ended in 1808 when the fortress surrendered to the Russians almost without resistance.

=== 19th century ===
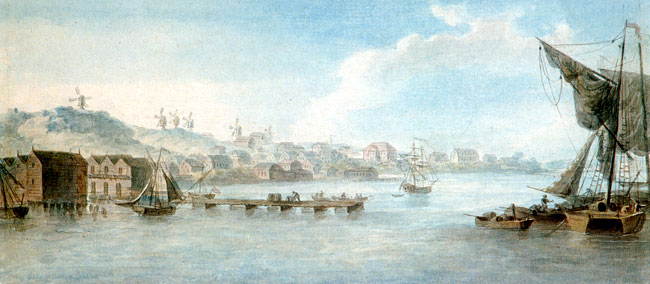
The Loviisa harbour painted by Gavril Sergeyev in 1808.

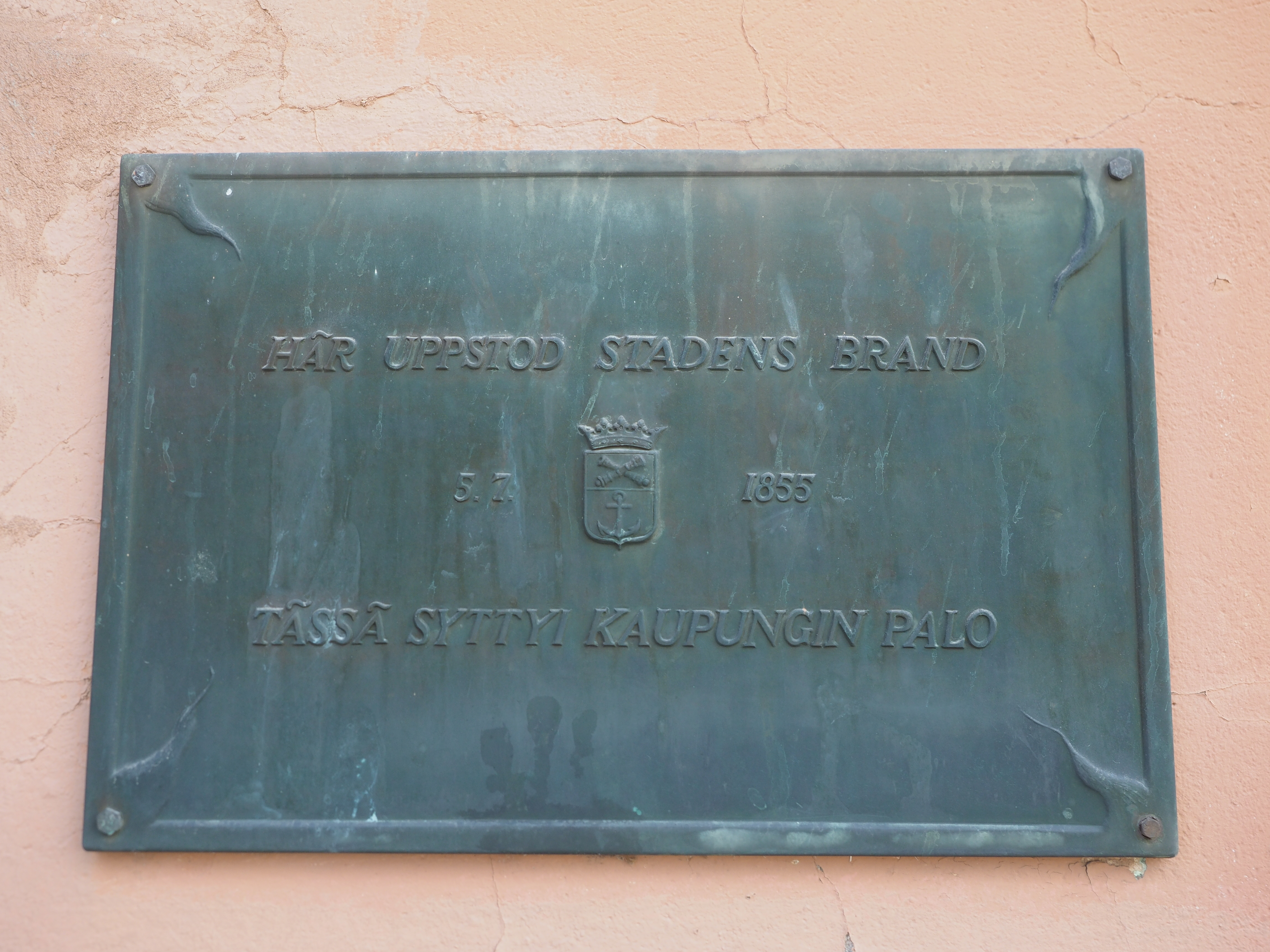
A plaque in central Loviisa marking the spot where the fire started on 5 July 1855.

The year 1855 during the Crimean War was a dramatic time in Loviisa. Late in the evening on 5 July a fire broke out in the town, which destroyed a large part of the old town blocks in the centre. As well as about 70 residential buildings, the wooden church of Loviisa was also destroyed in the fire. During the previous day, the English fleet had started firing at Svartholm, and on the day of the fire the fortress had exploded into ruins. The gunfire from the English warship was not actually connected to the fire in the town, and the actual cause of the fire remains a mystery. The events of summer 1855 are depicted in Runar Schildt's 1916 novel Sateenkaari (Regnbågen), with certain artistic liberties.

After the fire there was a proposal to move the town to the south, but the Imperial Senate decided in April 1856 to rebuild Loviisa at its original site. The reconstruction was done according to Ernst Lohrmann's zoning plan, which was largely based on Georg Theodor Chiewitz's proposal made before the fire. At the same time, in the early 1860s, Loviisa started to consciously develop into a spa town. The main building of the waterworks was built in 1865 at the site of the current Kappelinpuisto park. A restaurant was founded in the same greenspace, and the local "health springs" were put back into use.

In the 1880s Georg Öhman, the senior doctor at the spa, recommended Myllyharju as a suitable walking site for spa guests. A viewing pavilion was built in the early 1890s at the hill (at the site where the last windmill was transferred to in the 1920s). At the end of the decade the Mossebacken pension and the summer restaurant Casino, both designed by Lars Sonck, were built near Kukkukivi. The wooden pavilion at Kukkukivi was replaced with the current cast iron tower in 1906. Loviisa remained a popular spa town up to World War I. The spa activity had a significant effect on the economy of the town, and the town also developed a rich cultural life particularly in terms of music.

Up to the 1880s the most important sources of income in Loviisa were trade and handicraft. What little there was of industry was concentrated on seafaring (boat crafting) and stimulants. Loviisa had had a tobacco factory already since the 1750s, and in the late 1770s a state alcohol distillery was started in Loviisa (king Gustav III had forbidden home distillation). In 1858 count Carl Magnus Creutz formed a beer brewery in Loviisa. According to historian Olle Sirén, Creutz's entry into the business was based on his need to secure the sales of barley at the Malmgård manor. In 1874 the brewery was transferred to the Bavarian Heinrich Lehmann, and his family continued to brew beer for almost a century.

Industrialisation began in earnest in 1882 when the merchant Arseni Terichoff built a steam-operated sawmill at the current site of Sahaniemi. In the 1890s the sawmill had about fifty employees, and over a hundred in the early 1900s. A cardboard factory started in 1912 and soon became the second largest employer in the city. At the turn of the century a railway connection from Loviisa to Vesijärvi in Lahti was completed, and the cardboard factory was the first significant industrial company founded in Loviisa to make use of the railroad. The sea lane underneath the bridge was not deep enough for steamships, so harbour activity was moved first to Tullisilta and then to Valko upon the completion of the railroad.

=== 1900 to 1950 ===
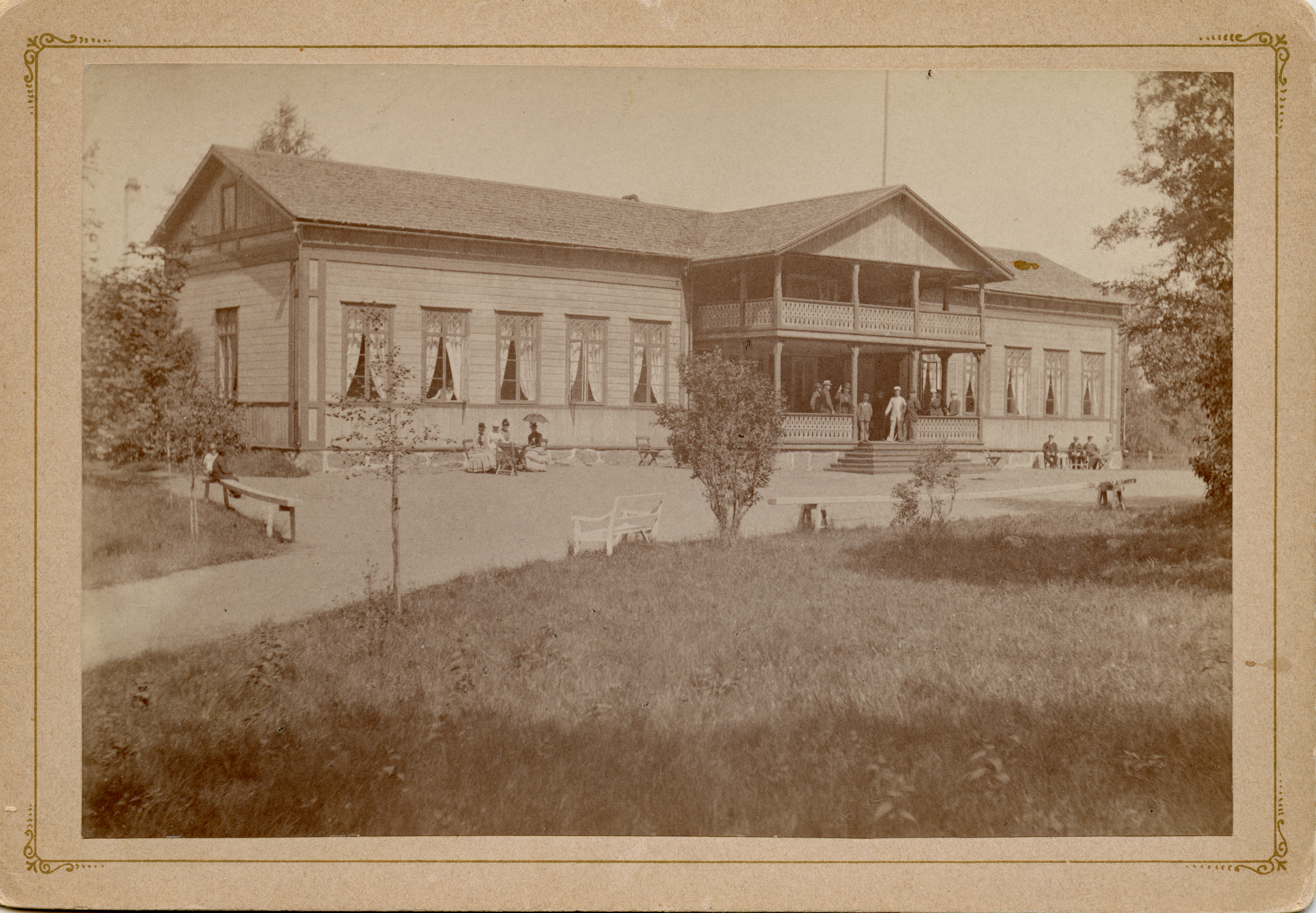
The spa building in Loviisa in the 1880s.

World War I affected Loviisa as unemployment and rising food prices. The activity of the sawmill ended in 1914, and the activity at the harbours decreased. In 1917 the Loviisa workers' association made demands about the seating of the important food committee. Despite amends made by the city council a political strike started in August. Socialist workers demanded properly paid jobs for all citizens of Loviisa as well as at least half of the seats in the food committee. In its meeting on 18 August the city council only agreed to the first demand. On the same day the workers declared a "state of full strike", cut of telecommunications and occupied the railway station. The city council held a meeting in the evening, deciding to form a guard.

On 19 August 150 citizens of Loviisa signed up for the guard, received white arm ribbons and marched onto the city square. The strikers retreated to Uusikaupunki. The socialists tried in vain to seek Russian military help from Helsinki, and during the same evening there was an attempt at the Workers' House to declare the strike as finished. But inspired by the Russian Revolution, a new strike began in Loviisa on 15 November, and only three days later the socialists called Russian soldiers for help. In addition to them, Red Guard members from Kotka arrived in Valko, and on 19 November 200 to 300 armed men marched from Valko to Loviisa. The police station, the telephone centre and the railway station were occupied. The red flag was hoisted at city hall, and 20 to 30 executive members of the city council were taken to Uusikaupunki as prisoners. A compromise about the police station was reached at the end of the year, and the situation calmed down.

Loviisa was among those places in Finland that the battles of the year 1918 affected closely. There was a civil war going on in Loviisa right from the start: part of the population supported a socialist revolution. Agitation played a part, but according to Sirén, in Loviisa lack of food and unemployment played the most important role. Preparation for the civil war included Jaeger training in Germany, and the first Finn to travel there was Georg Öhman, referred to as "Jäger Eins", the son of a doctor in Loviisa. Other Jaegers included Ragnar Nordström, the son of a customs officer. The guards at the Loviisa region were organised at New Year and at the end of January the guards numbered almost 200 people. Their armament left much to desire.

At the start of February the Red Guard in Loviisa numbered almost a hundred men. They had received weapons from the Red Guard in Kotka and from Russian soldiers. The civil war broke out on 27 January, and a bit more than a week after that the whites controlled the eastern part of the Uusimaa region from Sipoo to Loviisa. From the whites' viewpoint it was important that the Uusimaa guards could hold their positions. They were far away from the main frontlione but could hold off against red troops. On 6 February the reds attacked Loviisa from Kotka. The attackers numbered almost 550, of which about 50 were Red Guard members from the Loviisa area. After receiving news of the advance of the reds the whites in Loviisa moved about three kilometres east from the centre. There was an armed battle, after which the whites - threatened by a blockade - retreated to the Rosen and Ungern fortresses. There was another battle in the evening, where the whites lost ten men (there are no records of the reds' losses). The whites ran nearly out of ammunition and thus they retreated to the west. The reds moved to Pyhtää.

On the next day on 7 February the reds marched to Loviisa, hoisted a red flag at the city hall and founded their headquarters at the City Club. The reds engaged in violence resulting in more deaths of the whites than in the armed battles on 6 February. The revolutionary court of the reds issued over 70 sentences to members of the guard and to other "counter-revolutionaries". Many of the accused were sentenced to civil service and/or fines, so the reds would benefit financially. At the start of April, Mannerheim's troops occupied Tampere, and the German Detachment Brandenstein numbering 3000 men landed in Valko, advancing to Uusikylä and Lahti. The detachment left Loviisa on 16 December 1918 after Germany had lost World War I.

The spa reopened in 1919. The Russian soldiers had left after the October Revolution in 1917, but the spa still had 250 to 400 annual visitors in the early 1920s. In 1926 a fashionable beach life became accessible by transporting large amounts of sand to the Plagen beach. However, visitor numbers decreased in the late 1920s. An announcement about discontinuing the spa was made in 1929 when the city decided to continue operations in the spa. Loviisa failed to restore its reputation at the turn of the century, the spa had become badly deteriorated and there was intense competition from Hanko. In 1931 visitor numbers dropped below a hundred, and finally the city council decided in January 1935 not to open the spa any more. The women working at the spa protested and received permission to continue work under their own responsibility. The spa season in 1935 was a huge success, but in January 1936 the main building of the spa was completely destroyed in a fire. The spa was not rebuilt.

The land fronts in the Winter War and the Continuation War were a safe distance away from Loviisa. Nevertheless there was fear of an enemy landing, and the archipelago had guard stations and cannons. After the end of the Winter War there was a Danish battalion of 600 volunteer men on the archipelago for a few months. There were about 800 air strike alarms from 1939 to 1944, but the bombers mostly targeted Helsinki, Lahti or Kotka. During the Winter War Loviisa was bombed twice, and two citizens died. The bombings in the Continuation War were concentrated on the summers of 1941 and 1944, there were also two casualties. There is no record of the total number of Loviisa citizens killed during the wars. The new cemetery has 92 war hero graves, but not all of them were registered in Loviisa. In spring 1941 the Finnish Brother-in-Arms Association started to produce a Military Village project to the southwestern side of Myllyharju together with Ragnar Nordström. About 20 residential buildings were built at the Military Village, of which Nordström financed the most. The 200th anniversary of Loviisa was celebrated in 1945 with President of Finland Carl Gustaf Emil Mannerheim attending.

Nordström had already started a successful business career in the 1920s. In 1922 he founded a corporation named Lovisa Stevedoring, and during the next years he bought the majority of Lovisa Ångfartyg A.B. The company acquired its first steamship meant for international traffic in 1927. Around 1930 Nordström's shipping and cargo businesses started to form an entire concern. In spring 1931 he founded the company Loviisan Kalastus Oy and equipped his ships to catch herring at the Icelandic waters. In August the first shipment of herring reached Valko. Except for the war years, the catch of herring on Nordström's ships continued for over twenty years. The Nordström concern was at its largest in the 1950s when it employed 1700 people, of which over 700 lived in Loviisa.

=== From 1950 onwards ===
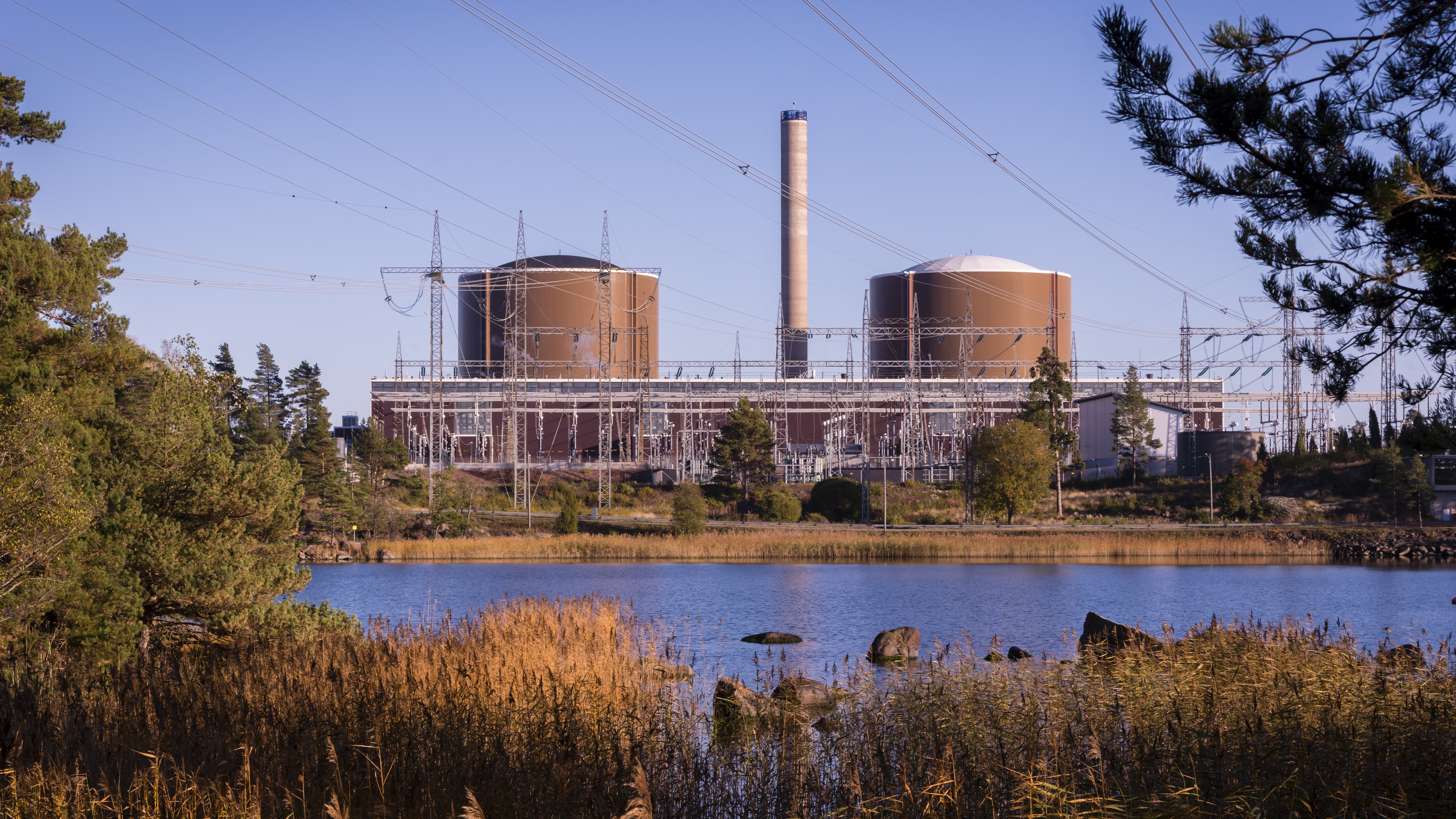
The Loviisa nuclear power plant.

The land surface area of Loviisa grew to over two times its size from 1920 to 1970. Antinkylä had already practically changed from a rural village to a city district when it was annexed to Loviisa in 1924. On the other hand, the annexation of Valko, which had also belonged to Pernå, to Loviisa caused much controversy. The city of Loviisa had bought large areas of land from the Valko area already in the early 20th century, and the annexation had been under plans for half a century until it was finally decided in 1956. In the same year it was confirmed that the state would take care of the railway between Valko and Lahti and widen its tracks (the railway has only served cargo traffic since 1981). The island of Hästholmen which had belonged to Ruotsinpyhtää was annexed to Loviisa in 1969 because of the upcomin nuclear power plant. The city of Loviisa had owned the lands of the island and its surrounding, and sold them to the nuclear power company Imatran Voima a few years earlier.

The two largest companies in Loviisa - the Nordström concern and Rauma-Repola - were under great difficulties in the middle 1960s, so building a nuclear power plant in the city was seen as important. In 1965 the city council received news of Imatran Voima's plans to build a nuclear power plant on the shores of the Gulf of Finland, and the mayor Gunnar Wahlström started proposing Loviisa as the site of the plant. Because of political reasons, the decision to build the plant was delayed, and construction only started in 1970. The machinery installations in autumn 1975 raised employment in Loviisa to its top figure at 3900 people. In March 1977 President of Finland Urho Kekkonen and Premier of the Soviet Union Alexei Kosygin inaugurated the first nuclear power plant unit. The deal of building another similar unit in Loviisa had been signed in August 1971. The unit was completed in 1980. The power plants had utilised large amounts of western technology right from the start, and their usage levels have reached international top rankings.

From 1983 to 1985 a state granary was built in the Valko harbour, containing sixteen silos slightly over 80 metres tall. The bypass to the north of the city centre could be taken into use in 1989. The extension of the highway between Porvoo and Koskenkylä to Loviisa had been completed five years earlier. In 1999 the part of the highway between Porvoo and Koskenkylä had been changed to a motorway. In the early 2010s the motorway was extended from Koskenkylä to Kotka and Hamina (the current motorway reaches up to the Vaalimaa border station against Russia). In 1995 the city of Loviisa celebrated its 250th anniversary and professor Sirén's history of the city was published in Finnish and Swedish.

Pernå, Liljendal and Ruotsinpyhtää were annexed to Loviisa on 1 January 2010. The annexation was done according to the municipalities' own proposals, Lapinärvi had decided not to undergo annexation. At the same time, the area of Haavisto-Vastila which had belonged to Ruotsinpyhtää was annexed to the municipality of Pyhtää. The annexation was led by Loviisa mayor Olavi Kaleva. The new municipality received an annexation grant of about 6.2 million euro from the state. Kaleva resigned from his post in spring 2017. The reason for his resignation was disagreement with the city council. In December 2017 Kaleva was succeeded by Jan D. Oker-Blom for a fixed term of seven years. In October 2018 the board of the Suomen Asuntomessut cooperative decided to award the 2023 event to Loviisa.

== Geography ==
Loviisa is located 77 kilometres to the east of Helsinki. The closest neighbouring municipalities are Porvoo to the west and Kotka to the east. Of the surface area of the municipality of Loviisa, 819.81 square kilometres are land, 25.83 square kilometres are inland waters and 905.88 square kilometres are sea. The land area of Loviisa is larger than that of Porvoo or Kotka, and even larger than those of Helsinki, Vantaa and Espoo put together. There are about forty lakes in the municipality, of which the largest is Hopjärvi (Tammijärvi is even larger but only a small part of it is located in Loviisa). Other large lakes include Lappominjärvi, Sarvalaxträsket, Särkjärvi and Teutjärvi. The rivers of Koskenkylänjoki, Loviisanjoki and Taasianjoki, as well as the western branches of the Kymi river run through Loviisa.

=== Central conurbation ===
The Finnish Museum Board has declared the Esplanadi area in Loviisa around the market square as a nationally significant cultural area. Esplanadi has also been chosen as the cultural landscape of the year in the Western Kymi cultural road in 2019. The principal buildings in the area include the pink city hall (Georg Theodor Chiewitz 1862), the Neo-Gothic Loviisa church (Georg Theodor Chiewitz and Julius Basilier 1865) and Finland's oldest surviving wooden social club (Georg Theodor Chiewitz 1863 and Selim A. Lindqvist 1907). Historical districts in the central conurbation include the city centre and the districts of Alakaupunki, Garnisoni and Uusikaupunki. Alakaupunki was spared in the 1855 fire, and it contains the auxiliary building of the Degerby horse stead dating from the 1690s. It is one of Finland's oldest wooden buildings. Uusikaupunki was built as a workers' district to the west of the railway station in the early 20th century.

Other districts include Uusi teollisuusalue, Vanha teollisuusalue, Pohjoistulli, Panimonmäki, Hakalehto, Ulrika, Määrlahti, Rauhala, Eteläharju, Antinkylä, Bella, Haravankylä, Köpbacka and Valko. Valko is both a residential district and a harbour and industrial district. The districts of Määrlahti, Rauhala, Eteläharju and Valko contain suburban apartment building areas.

The western entrance area to the centre of Loviisa along the Finnish National Road 7 started to be called Kuningattarenportti ("Queen's gate") in the early 2010s, and developed into an area of shops and business buildings. At the same time, a new large residential area was planned to the Harmaakallio area to the west of the central conurbation, but only a small part of it has been completed. A new residential area named Kuningattarenranta is being built on the eastern shore of the Loviisanlahti bay, which will host the 2023 event of the Asuntomessut fair.

=== Conurbations ===
According to the definition given by the Finnish Statistics Centre, Loviisa has seven conurbations in addition to the central conurbation. Of these three are parishes: Liljendal, Pernå and Ruotsinpyhtää. The St. Michael's church built in Pernå in the 15th century is the oldest building in Loviisa. Two of the conurbations - Koskenkylä and the Ruotsinpyhtää parish - have been built around ironworks areas. The Koskenkylä ironworks area is mainly closed to visitors, whereas Strömfors in Ruotsinpyhtää is open for tourism. Other than the central conurbation, the largest conurbations in the municipality are Koskenkylä and Tesjoki, both with about a thousand inhabitants. In late 2019 Loviisa had 14,772 inhabitants, of which 10,904 lived in conurbations, 3,728 in dispersed settlements and 140 at unknown locations. Of the population of Loviisa, 74.5% lived in conurbations.

=== Countryside and archipelago ===
There are numerous manors in Loviisa, of which the most are located in the western part of the municipality. The manor concentration of Sjögård, Tervik and Tjusterby in Pernåviken dating from the Middle Ages forms a nationally significant cultural area. Other historically significant manors include the Suur-Sarvilahti manor near the central conurbation, the Malmgård manor in the northwestern part of the municipality and the Kulla manor in the east. The manors are in private ownership, only a few of them (Malmgård, Labby, Suur-Sarvilahti and Kulla) are even partly open to the public.

Of the tens of villages in Loviisa the Pernå parish, Fasarby, Horslök and Härkäpää are historically significant. Fasarby is a group village dating from the Middle Ages consisting of old business houses for soldiers. The village is located in the southwestern part of the municipality at the bottom of the Fasarbyviken bay, and its current buildings consist of paired houses built in the 18th and 19th centuries and mansard roof villas built in the 1920s. The archipelago villages of Horslök and Härkäpää (Swedish: Härpe) are located in Sarvisalo. Both villages date from the Middle Ages, and they have exceptionally well preserved their appearance from the early 20th century. There is a windmill built in the 19th century in Härkäpää.

The island of Sarvisalo has a surface area of 27.4 square kilometres and is the largest island in Loviisa, with a permanent connection to the mainland. Other large islands include Gäddbergsö, Kampuslandet and Keipsalo. The island of Hästholmen is known for the Loviisa nuclear power plant, and the Svartholm fortress is one of the most famous tourist destinations in Loviisa. After the Crimean War the fortress was left to decay, but it has been restored led by the Finnish Museum Board since the 1960s. There is a pilot station in Orrengrund and a lightouse in Tiiskeri (Swedish: Digskär). There has previously been pilot activity in Boistö and the neighbouring island of Lehtinen (Swedish: Lövö), but they now host accommodation services and meeting facilities. Boistö hosted secret negotiations between Russia and the United States about the situation in Ukraine in summer 2014.

=== Climate ===
Climate data for Loviisa Orrengrund (1991–2020 normals, extremes 1994– present)
Month	Jan	Feb	Mar	Apr	May	Jun	Jul	Aug	Sep	Oct	Nov	Dec	Year
Record high °C (°F)	7.3 (45.1)	6.3 (43.3)	10.4 (50.7)	16.2 (61.2)	25.1 (77.2)	27.5 (81.5)	30.1 (86.2)	28.2 (82.8)	22.7 (72.9)	16.0 (60.8)	12.7 (54.9)	8.6 (47.5)	30.1 (86.2)
Daily mean °C (°F)	−3.1 (26.4)	−4.4 (24.1)	−1.7 (28.9)	2.8 (37.0)	8.6 (47.5)	13.5 (56.3)	17.5 (63.5)	17.1 (62.8)	12.8 (55.0)	7.3 (45.1)	2.9 (37.2)	−0.3 (31.5)	6.1 (43.0)
Record low °C (°F)	−26.3 (−15.3)	−25.0 (−13.0)	−20.0 (−4.0)	−10.3 (13.5)	−3.2 (26.2)	4.0 (39.2)	7.5 (45.5)	7.6 (45.7)	2.5 (36.5)	−5.4 (22.3)	−13.2 (8.2)	−24.1 (−11.4)	−26.3 (−15.3)
Source 1: FMI normals for Finland 1991-2020
Source 2: Record highs and lows

=== Distances ===
Distances from the city centre of Loviisa to other localities along the shortest routes with their approximated driving times:

- Helsinki 89 km (1 h 4 min)
- Helsinki-Vantaa airport 85 km (53 min)
- Porvoo 38 km (29 min)
- Lahti 80 km (1 h 13 min)
- Pyhtää 21 km (17 min)
- Kouvola 67 km (58 min)
- Kotka Sutela 39 km (26 min)
- Kotkansaari 45 km (33 min)
- Hamina 59 km (40 min)

== Sights ==
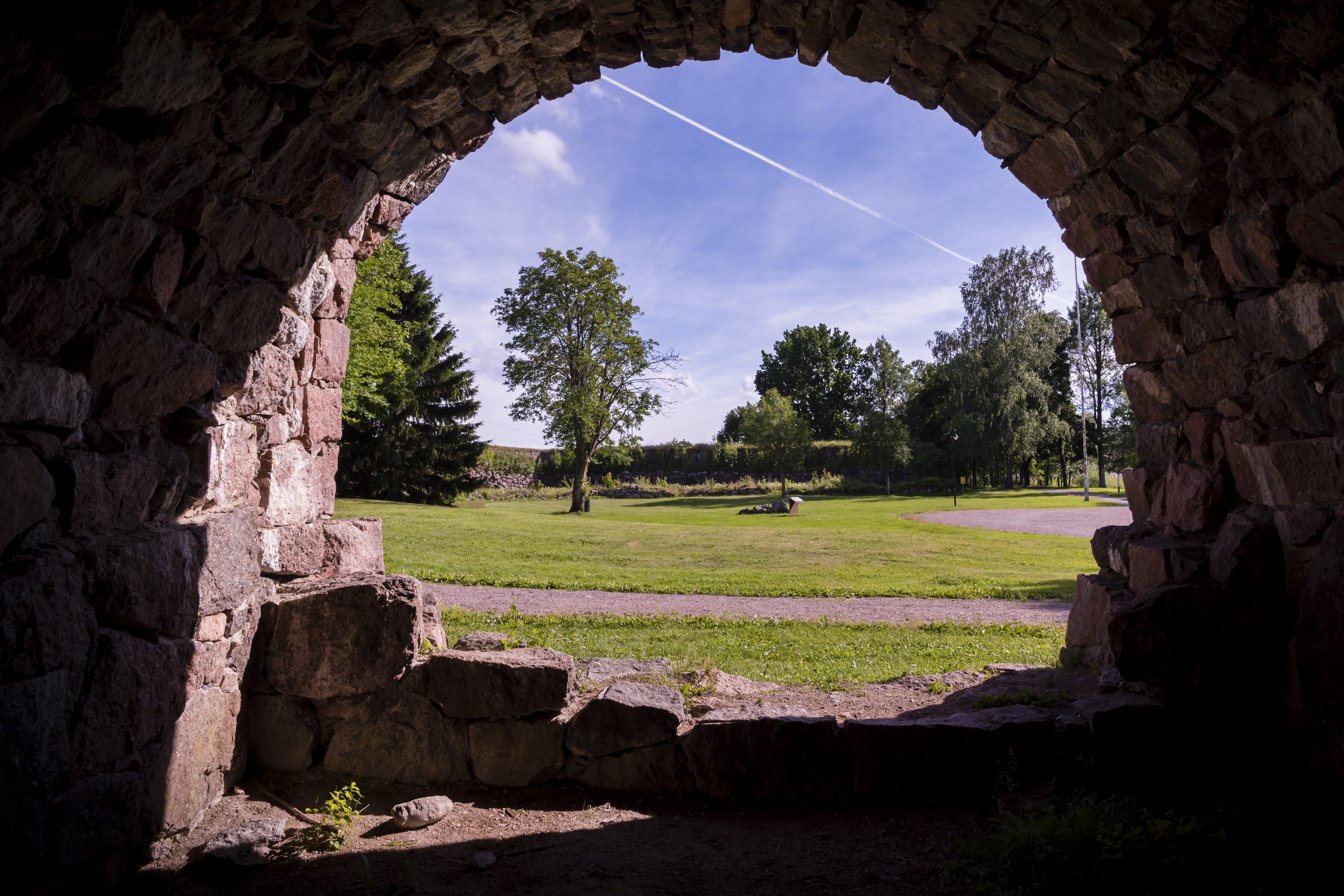
The Bastion Ungern Fortress.

The building of the sea fortress of Svartholm, located to the south from the city, was begun at the same time as the fortification of Loviisa. The purpose of the sea fortress was to protect the city from the sea, as well as to offer safe haven for the Swedish coastal navy. A joint Anglo-French navy unit destroyed the battlements of the island during the naval warfare in the Gulf of Finland. No longer fit for use the fortress was left to decay. As of the 1960s the fortress has been restored led by the Finnish Heritage Agency. The restoration was brought to a conclusion in time for the 250th jubilee of the fortress in 1998.

During the summers various programmes are arranged on the island of Svartholm for both locals and tourists. The guided tours are popular adventure for youth, and the restaurant lure both boaters and people travelling by the ferry boat, which regularly goes between Loviisa centre and Svartholm.

Loviisa is also renowned for its Old Town. The Old Town was spared from the great fire of 1855. An annex of the Degerby estate, dating from the 17th century, is located in the Old Town. The building is one of the oldest surviving wooden houses in Finland. In Loviisa there is also a high society clubhouse, the only one of its kind in Finland spared from fires. Having been restored it now is a library/mediatheque. The first church in Loviisa was destroyed during the fire. The current Neo-Gothic church was inaugurated in 1865.

The German Brandenstein division landed in Valko in Loviisa on 7 April 1918. The division advanced as far as to Lahti, before returning to Loviisa in order to leave the country on 16 December 1918, as Germany had lost World War I.

The summers are lively in Loviisa. The most popular summer events are the Historical Houses of Loviisa (an event for traditional house building and renovating), the Sibelius Days, the Loviisa Day on 25 August and the King Arrives in Loviisa (a weekend in the spirit of the 18th century), Small Ships' Race (festival for traditional small sailing ships), the Peace Forum and the horse trotting contests.

== Economy ==
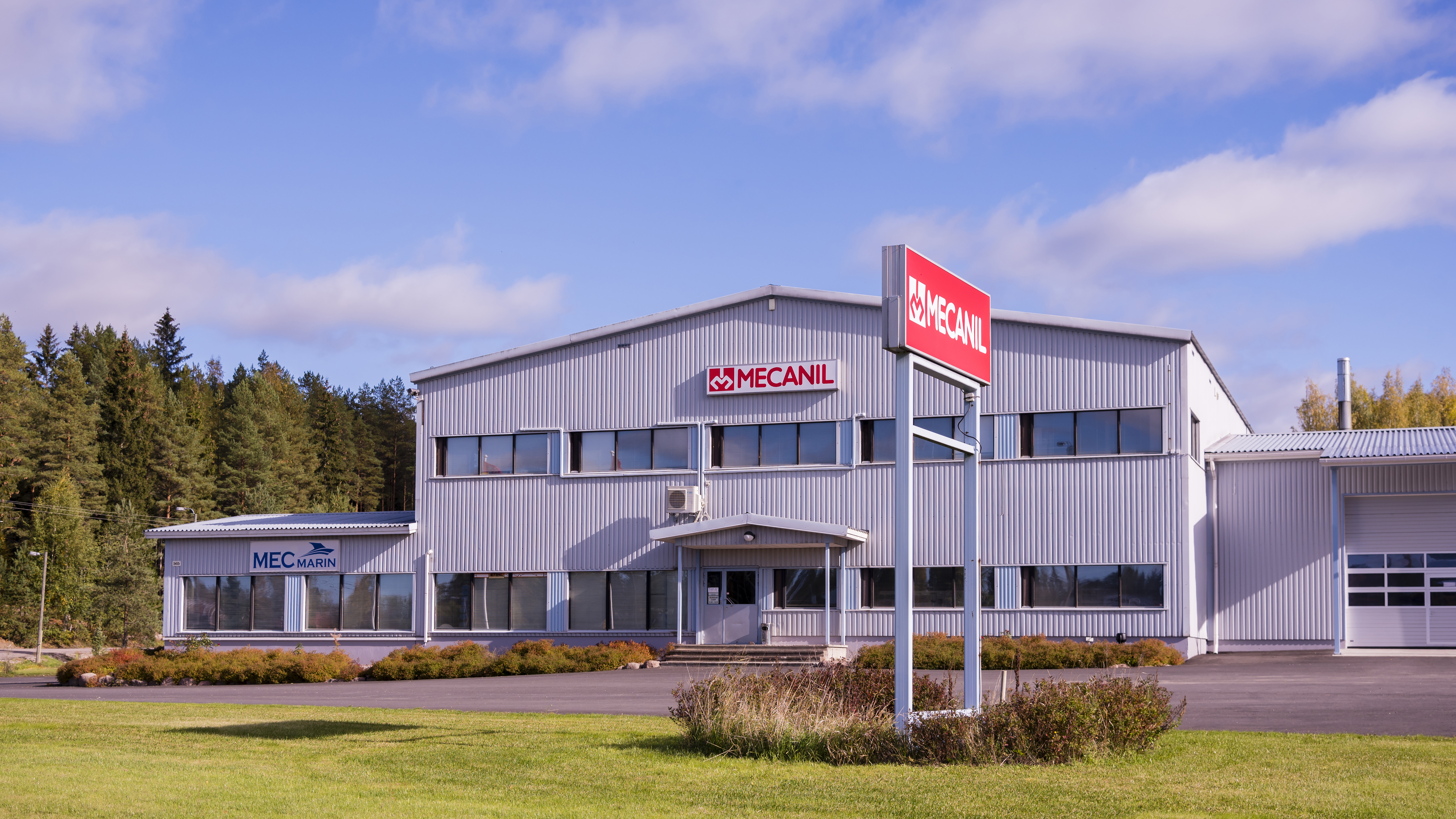
The Mecanil hydraulics manufacturer in Liljendal.

Loviisa has many companies related to the local tourism. The port in Valko and the Loviisa Power Plant bring industry to Loviisa. There is also an industrial park in the Uusikaupunki district, housing many smaller companies, for instance mechanical shops and retail sellers of spare parts.

There is a harbour for cargoes such as timber, bulk and parcelled goods in the southern city district of Valko. From the harbour there is a traffic connection to Route 7, the major highway between Helsinki and St Petersburg. Loviisa centre is located immediately by Route 7, equally close to Helsinki and the Russian border. There is also a train connection from the harbour to Lahti, from where the carriages can reach other destinations in the country. The route into the harbour is 9.5 meters deep.

The city of Loviisa is the largest employer in the municipality. It has over a thousand employees and an annual budget of about 130 million euro. The income tax percentage in Loviisa is 20.25%. In 2019 the city received 59 million euro in tax income and 25 million euro in state subsidies. The largest expenses were personnel costs (49 million) and service purchases (47 million). In 2020 the loans of the municipality concern amounted to 7158 euro per citizen, which was smaller than the average in Uusimaa. The 2021 financial statement of the city of Loviisa had a surplus of 4.6 million euro. The city owns significant minority shares of Loviisan Satama Oy and Kymenlaakson Sähkö Oy. In 2019 the rate of self-sufficiency in the jobs in Loviisa was 82.0%. According to the Statistics Centre, 5.4% of the jobs were in primary production, 32.7% in refinery and 59.4% in services. The employment rate was 73.8%, the highest since 1989. In November 2021 11.4% of the population in Loviisa were unemployed when the average rate in Uusimaa was 10.0%.

The largest individual employer in Loviisa is Fortum Power and Heat Oy and its nuclear power plant on the island of Hästholmen, 15 kilometres south from the centre. Fortum employs over 500 people in Loviisa. The central conurbation hosts a factory building Loval electroni components. It employs about 300 people making Loval the third largest employer in the city. There are industrial areas all over the municipality. The areas of Uusi teollisuusalue and Vanha teollisuusalue are located near the centre, including small businesses such as repair shops and spare parts shops. The area of Valko includes harbour activity and other industry, including the Timberpoint wood element factory and the boat outfitter Boomerang Boats. The Liljendal industrial area includes several successful businesses such as the healthcare product manufacturer Teampac, the packaging company Liljendalin Tehdas, the screw spool manufacture Topcore and the hydraulics company Mecanil. Companies in the Tesjoki industrial area include Kuusisen Kala (Disa's Fish), Eltete (wood and paper refinery) and Nalco Finland Manufacturing producing special chemicals. There is also a small industrial area in Koskenkylä.

== Schools and education ==
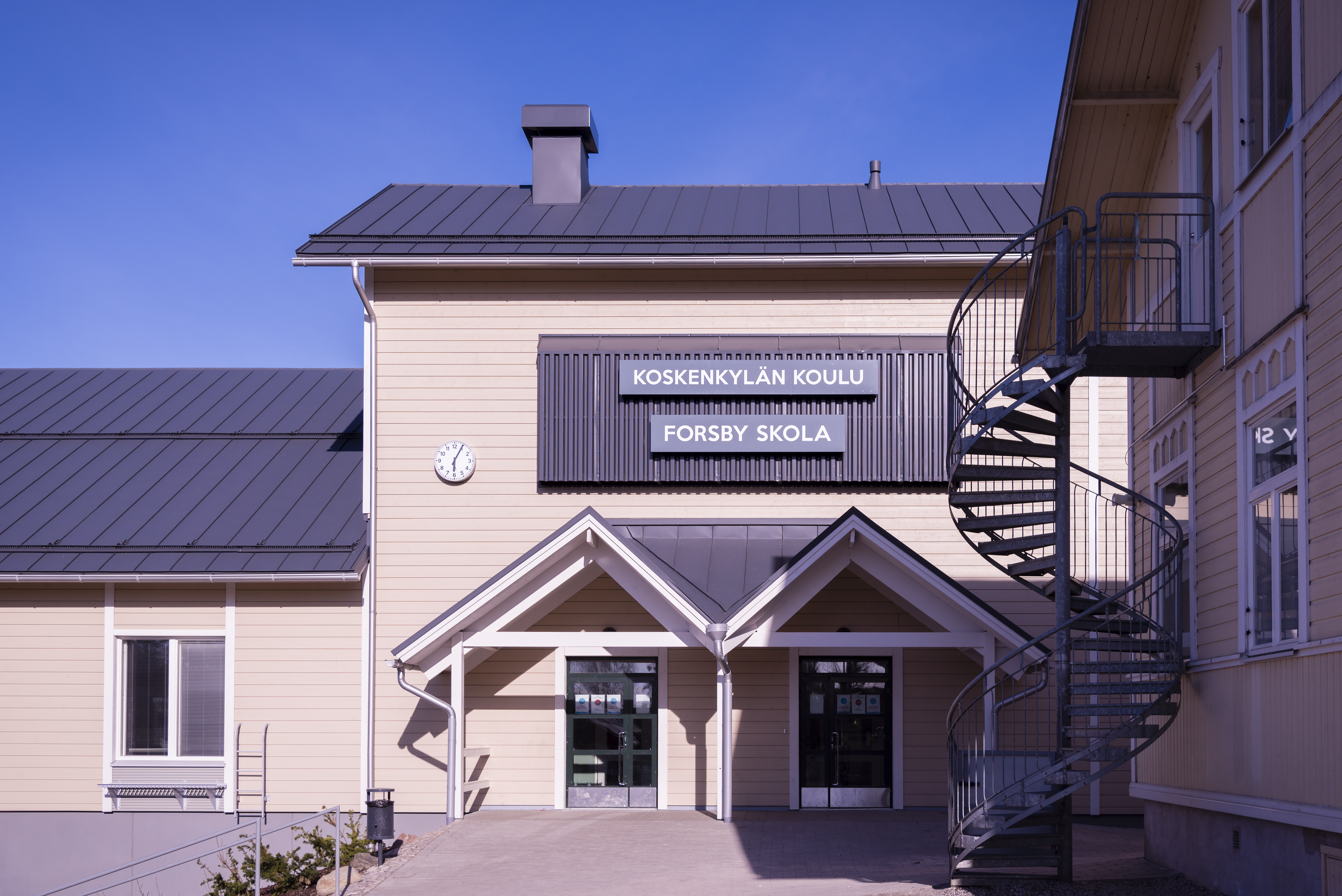
The central school in Koskenkylä.

There are 13 primary schools in Loviisa, of which six are Finnish-speaking and seven are Swedish-speaking. Ten of the schools are located in village centres all around Loviisa. There are two gymnasiums, the Finnish-speaking Loviisan lukio and the Swedish-speaking Lovisa Gymnasium. There is a bilingual folk high school in Loviisa, holding classes both in the centre and in the villages, also active in the areas of Lapinjärvi and Pyhtää.

In the 2010s and early 2020s the city of Loviisa invested in new school buildings. A new building for the junior stage primary school was built in 2014. Because of indoor air problems the building was intermittently out of use from 2018 to 2019. The old part of the Harjurinne school and Loviisan lukio built in the 1950 has been renovated and there are new exercise opportunities for the students, such as ball game fields.

Most of the school buildings are made of wood. Koskenkylä received a new bilingual central school when a new log school building was built next to the Forsby skolan building. The old school building is also made of logs and was renovated at the same time. The central school was completed in autumn 2020.

The construction of the new Swedish-speaking senior stage primary school in the centre of Loviisa - Lovisavikens skola - used slightly more modern wood materials, cross-laminated timber elements and laminated beam bars. The two-story school building was completed in late 2020, and the Lovisa Gymnasium next to it was renovated at the same time. The house technics in the Art Nouveau building from the early 20th century were renovated (including the air conditioning) and an elevator shaft was built outside the additional wing built in the 1950s.

== Congregations ==
After the 2019 renovation, the Evangelical Lutheran Church of Finland in Loviisa has split into two congregations, the Finnish and Swedish Agricola congregations, which are also active in Lapinjärvi. The two congregations form the congregation association in the Loviisa area. In 2023, 68.2% of the citizens of Loviisa belonged to the Evangelical Lutheran Church.

After the 2010 annexation there were five Evangelical Lutheran congregations in Loviisa: the Liljendal congregation, the Finnish congregation in Loviisa, the Pernå congregation, the Ruotsinpyhtää congregation and the Swedish congregation in Loviisa.

The congregation of south-eastern Finland of the Orthodox Church of Finland is also active in the Loviisa area. The city also has an independent Pentecostal congregation.

== Tourism ==
=== Accommodation ===
Loviisa offers diverse accommodation services. There are two hotels in the city centre, and a couple of slightly more modest inns in the centre or near it. There are individual cabins and villas available for rent all over the municipality. Near the Rönnäs golf course, on the western shore of the Pernåviken bay, are cabin villages with tens of cabins.

=== Camping area ===
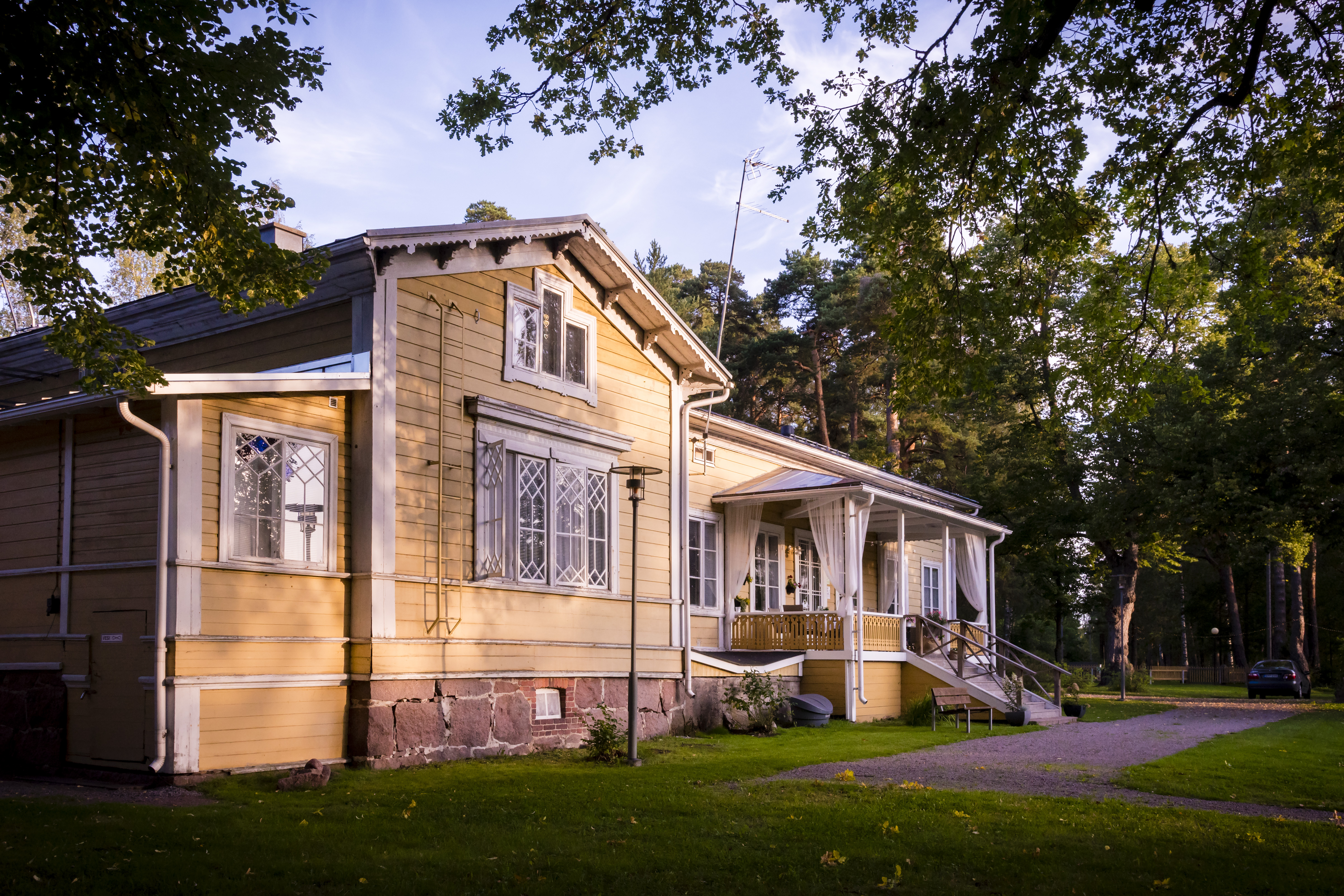
Willa Björksten at Loviisa Camping.

Loviisa Camping is located in Tamminiemi on the shore of the Loviisanlahti bay. The camping area is operated by the city of Loviisa. The camping area is two kilometres away from the city centre, but only a bit more than a kilometre away from Laivasilta, the centre of summer life in Loviisa. The Plagen beach and the tennis and padel fields in Casinopuisto are located right next to the camping area. The camping area has an old French formal garden and two well preserved Empire style wooden buildings from the 19th century. The light blue building hosts the reception, a café and maintenance facilities, and the yellow building - Willa Björksten - has seven accommodation rooms with three more in the courtyard building. There are about 50 places for recreational vehicles and caravans and about 20 places for tents. The area is open from spring to autumn.

=== Visitor boat harbours ===
There are several official small boat harbours with visitor spaces for visiting boaters. The Laivasilta harbour with 60 visitor boat spaces is located near the city centre. It is a so-called "Roope harbour" meaning it fulfils the environmental requirements of the Pidä Saaristo Siistinä ("Keep the Archipelago Clean") union. The Tullisilta pier is located less than a kilometre south from Laivasilta, meant for slightly bigger boats. The Svartholm fortress island has about 65 free-of-charge visitor boat spaces. There are also visitor boat piers in Kabböle, Backstensstrand and Rönnäs.

== Events ==
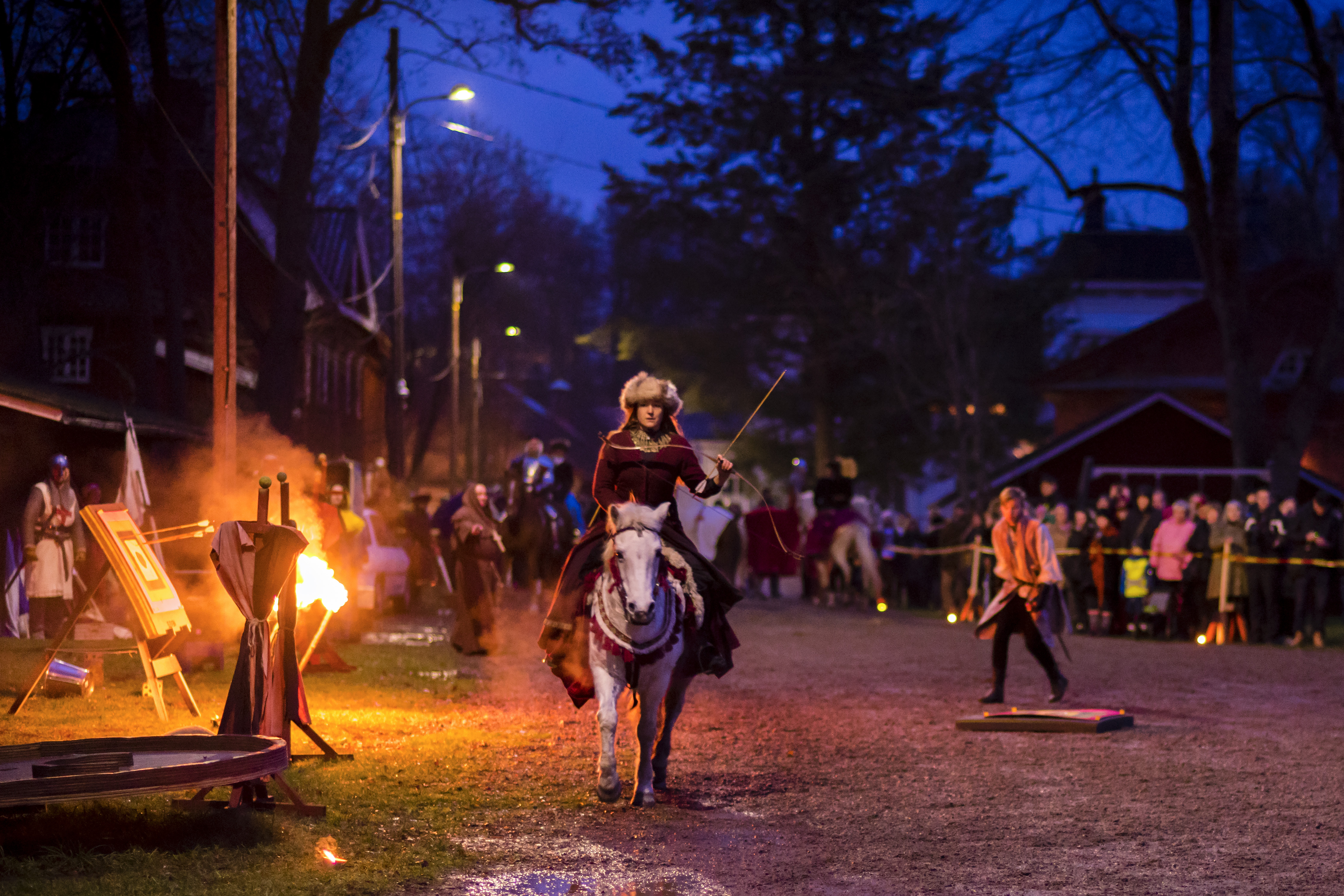
The Kekri event at the Strömfors ironworks.

Summer is an active time in Loviisa. Recurring events include Loviisan Wanhat Talot, the Small Ships' Race boat festival, Midsummer parties in Laivasilta and Svartholm, Avoimet puutarhat, Loviisan Rauhanfoorumi, the reader festival of the Nya Östis newspaper, the Loviisa Week, the "Kuningas saapuu Loviisaan" ("The King arrives in Loviisa") weekend and toto races. Events outside the central conurbation include the Old time days (in the Jokela home museum), the Liljendal days, Ruotsinpyhtää Bluegrass and Ruukki Picnic (veteran cars).

In early autumn, the Sibelius days are celebrated all over the city, and the Night of the ancient fires is celebrated in Laivasilta. There has been a Kekri event in the Strömfors ironworks between October and November, which has attracted many visitors. In the winter citizens of Loviisa open their homes to the public in the Wanhan Ajan Joulukodit ("Christmas Homes of Old Times") event, and there are Christmas markets on the market square, in Laivasilta, in the Strömfors ironworks and at the Malmgård manor. The New Year is celebrated with cabaret performances at the local film theatre. There is a Brandenstein march in April, followed by Vappu celebrations at the market square and in Laivasilta, and the opening of the summer season at the Strömfors ironworks later in May.

=== Asuntomessut 2023 ===
The 2023 event of the national Asuntomessut fair was held in Kuningattarenranta in Loviisa from 7 July to 6 August 2023. The residential area of Kuningattarenranta is completely new and located between Loviisanlahti and Saaristotie, only a kilometre away from the city centre. Many lots have their own beaches and nearly all have a view to the sea. The area was mostly populated with small houses, and also with a couple of apartment buildings, of which at least one is made of wood. Floating detached houses and a glass-walled greenhouse have already attracted great interest.

== Sports and exercise ==
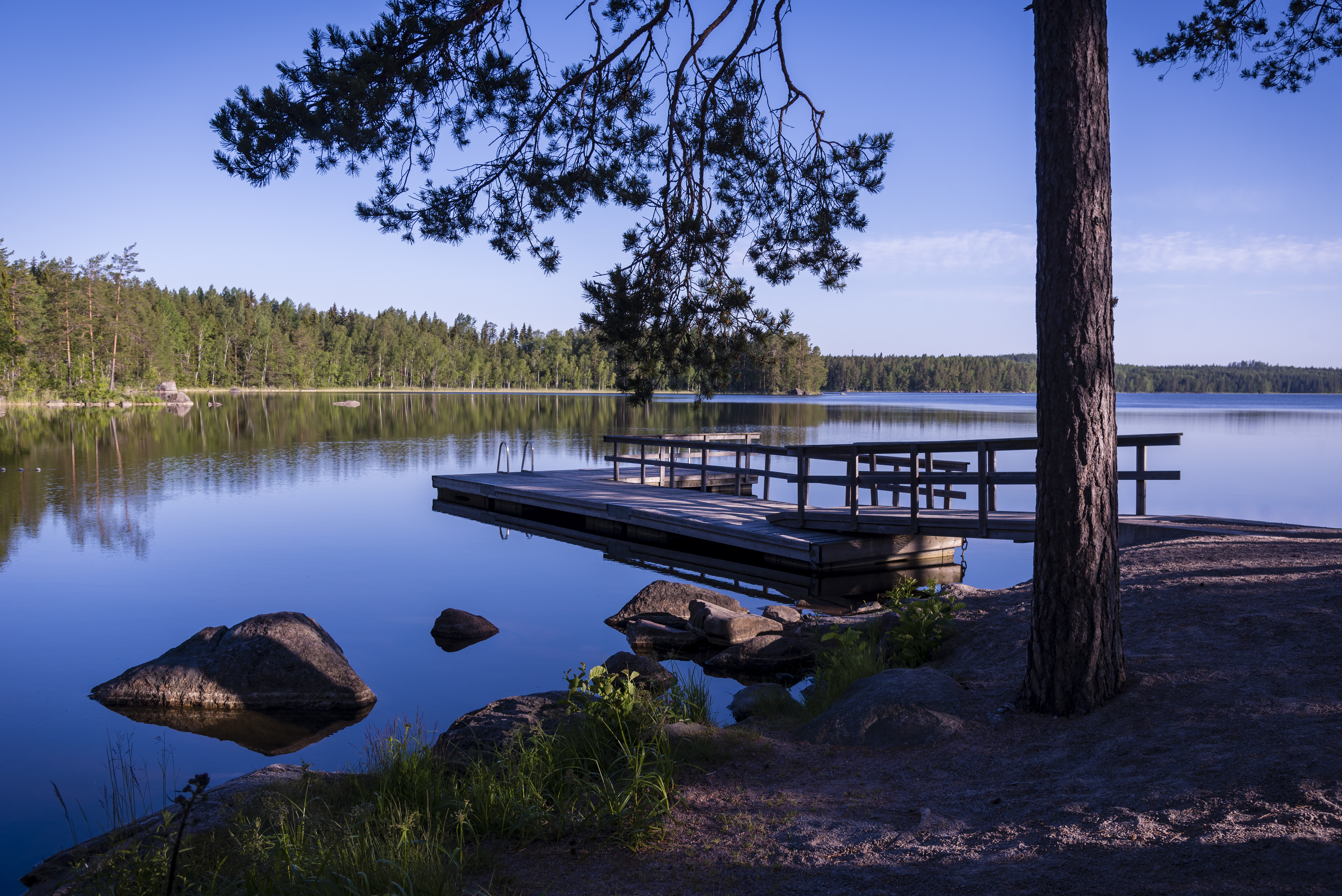
The southern beach of Särkjärvi.

=== Sport clubs ===
The football club FC Loviisa was born when the clubs Loviisan Tor and Loviisan Riento joined their football teams. Riento continued as a boxing and wrestling club, whereas Loviisan Tor now concentrates on floorball, cross-country skiing, badminton and athletics. FC Loviisa also has futsal teams, and Loviisan Tenniskerho and Hokki Basket allow for tennis and basketball respectively. The city has an ice hockey club and a figure skating club, and its judo and taekwondo clubs allow for martial arts. The Swedish-speaking gymnastics club Lovisa Gymnastikförening was founded in 1897. Some smaller conurbations have local clubs concentrating on cross-country skiing, athletics and frisbee golf. Loviisa also has an active shooting club.

=== Exercise places ===
The Loviisa exercise hall is located near the city centre, next to the Loviisanlahti bay. The hall is used by the floorball teams of Loviisan Tor and the futsal teams of FC Loviisa. The Agricola hall in Koskenkylä is of similar size, whereas the exercise halls in Liljendal and Valko are much smaller. There are a couple of private gyms in the city centre and halls operated by the municipality in other conurbations.

There is a private padel hall in Uusi teollisuusalue in Loviisa, and there is a bowling alley operated by Loviisan Keilailuliitto in the Rauhala district. Rauhala also hosts a lightly-built ice rink and an astroturf field operated by FC Loviisa right next to it. There is a slightly smaller astroturf field near the Finnish-speaking school centre.

The Keskusurheilukenttä sports field is located near the city centre with a training field next to it. There are also sports fields in Liljendal, Ruukki, Isnäs, the Pernå parish and Valko. There are three tennis fields, operated by Loviisan Tenniskerho, in the Casinopuisto park in the city centre opposite the Plagen beach. There is also a new padel field in the park and there are two volleyball fields on the beach. Other beaches include the southern beach of Särkjärvi and Taikaranta in Liljendal. There is an 18-hole golf course in Rönnäs on the western shore of the Pernåviken bay. There are ice hockey and skating rinks as well as smaller ball game fields all over the municipality.

=== Race track ===
The Loviisa race track is located only 700 metres from the Loviisa market square. The track was built in 1950s and is operated by Itä-Uudenmaan Oriyhdistys ry, founded in 1926. The race track holds five toto races every summer and also serves as a coaching track all year round. In 2018 the track was awarded as the summer race track of the year.

=== Hiking routes ===
There are two historical and close to the nature walking routes in the city centre: Ehrensvärdinpolku and the Myllyharju walking route. Both routes are about two kilometres long. The Urheilupaviljonki, Harmaakallio, Tesjoki and Valko exercise paths are located slightly further away from the centre, serving as ski tracks in winter. There is a short hiking trail in Liljendal, and there are ski tracks in the Pernå parish, Koskenkylä, Andersby, the Ruotsinpyhtää parish and Ruotsinkylä.

The Kukuljärvi hiking route is located near the Strömfors ironworks, starting from the Ruukki sports centre, with a large free-of-charge parking site. The route is about eight kilometres long, but an additional hike of two kilometres is needed to see the Branni cave. There are barbecue grills on the shore of lake Kukuljärvi and river Kymi. Because of the difficult terrain, the route is not accessible for people with limited mobility. The Kallen kierros hiking route, 11.5 kilometres long, is located in Liljendal and goes along much smoother terrain.

== Culture ==
=== Museums ===
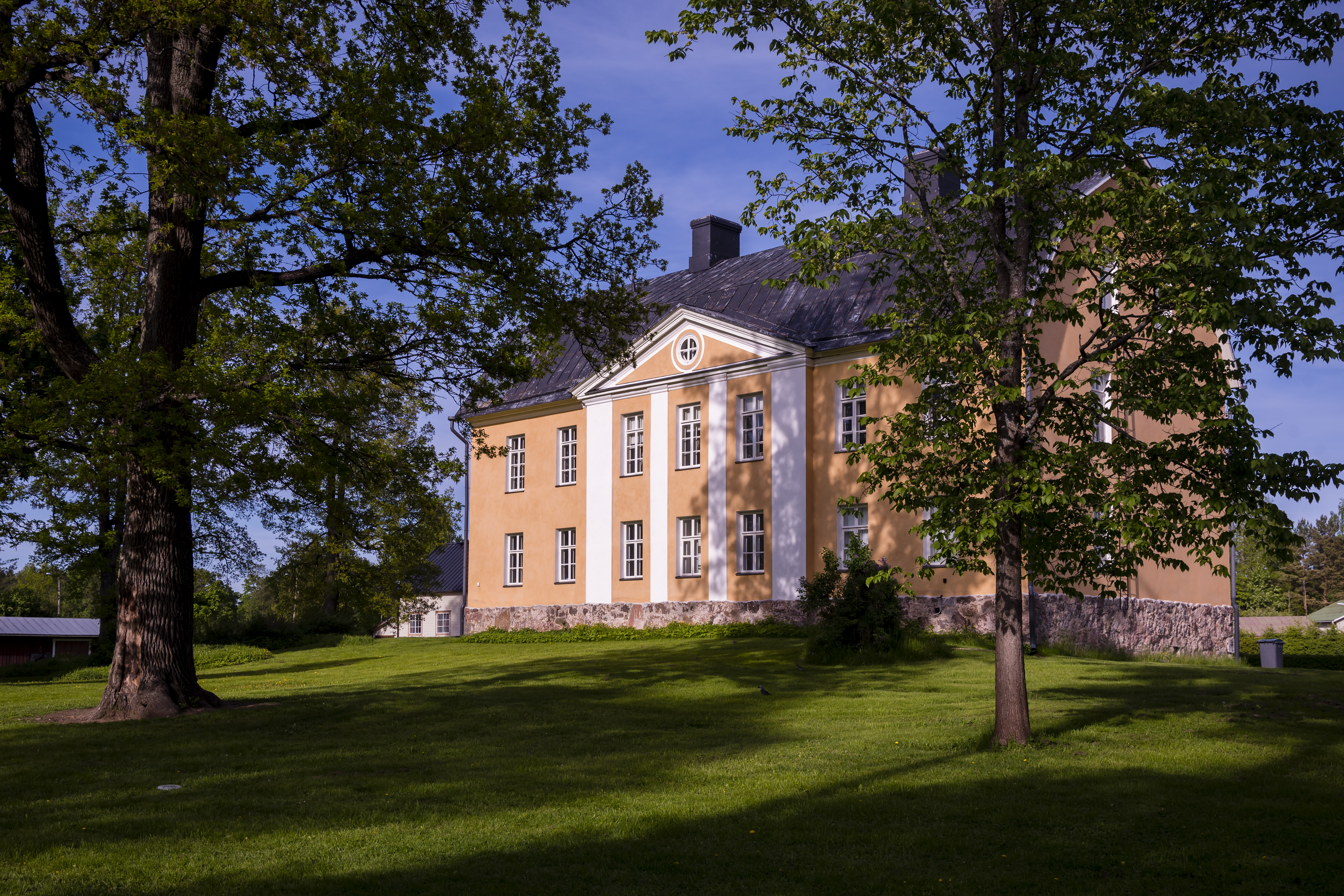
The Komendantintalo building, designed by Samuel Berner in 1755.

The city museum of Loviisa was founded in 1904, and since the 1960s its main premises have been in the Komendantintalo house built in 1755. It has a basic exhibition and alternating theme exhibitions. The smithy museum of the Strömfors ironworks and the Viirilä homestead museum are part of the city museum of Loviisa. The smithy museum offers exhibits of the old ironworks and the way the smiths worked, whereas the Viirilä homestead museum offers exhibits of peasant and handicraft culture of previous centuries.

There are also several private museums in Loviisa, of which the Maritime Museum is located the nearest to the city centre. It is located on the city's old harbour area in Laivasilta and is operated by the Loviisa Maritime History Foundation. The museum holds diverse exhibits of the city's maritime history, including models of ships, paintings, the parlor of an old steamship and other maritime things. The century-old harbour tugboat Onni also belongs to the foundation.

The Jokela homestead museum is located in Ruotsinkylä in the northeastern part of the municipality, specialising in farming and forestry history. It is open on Sundays in July, and by appointment at other times. The Archipelago Museum in Rönnäs and the Isnäs steam engine museum are located on the western shore of the Pernåviken bay. The Agricola museum is located in Koskenkylä and the "Finland's smallest shop museum" is located in Skinnarby, exhibiting items from the 1950s and 1960s.

=== Libraries ===
The main library of the city of Loviisa was located in the historically significant Club room building since 1998. Because of indoor air problems the library moved out of the premises in 2018 and into new premises in Alakaupunki. There are local libraries in Tesjoki, Liljendal and the Pernå parish. There is also a library bus going around the city. The Loviisa library is part of the Helle library network common to many municipalities in Uusimaa.

=== Visual art ===
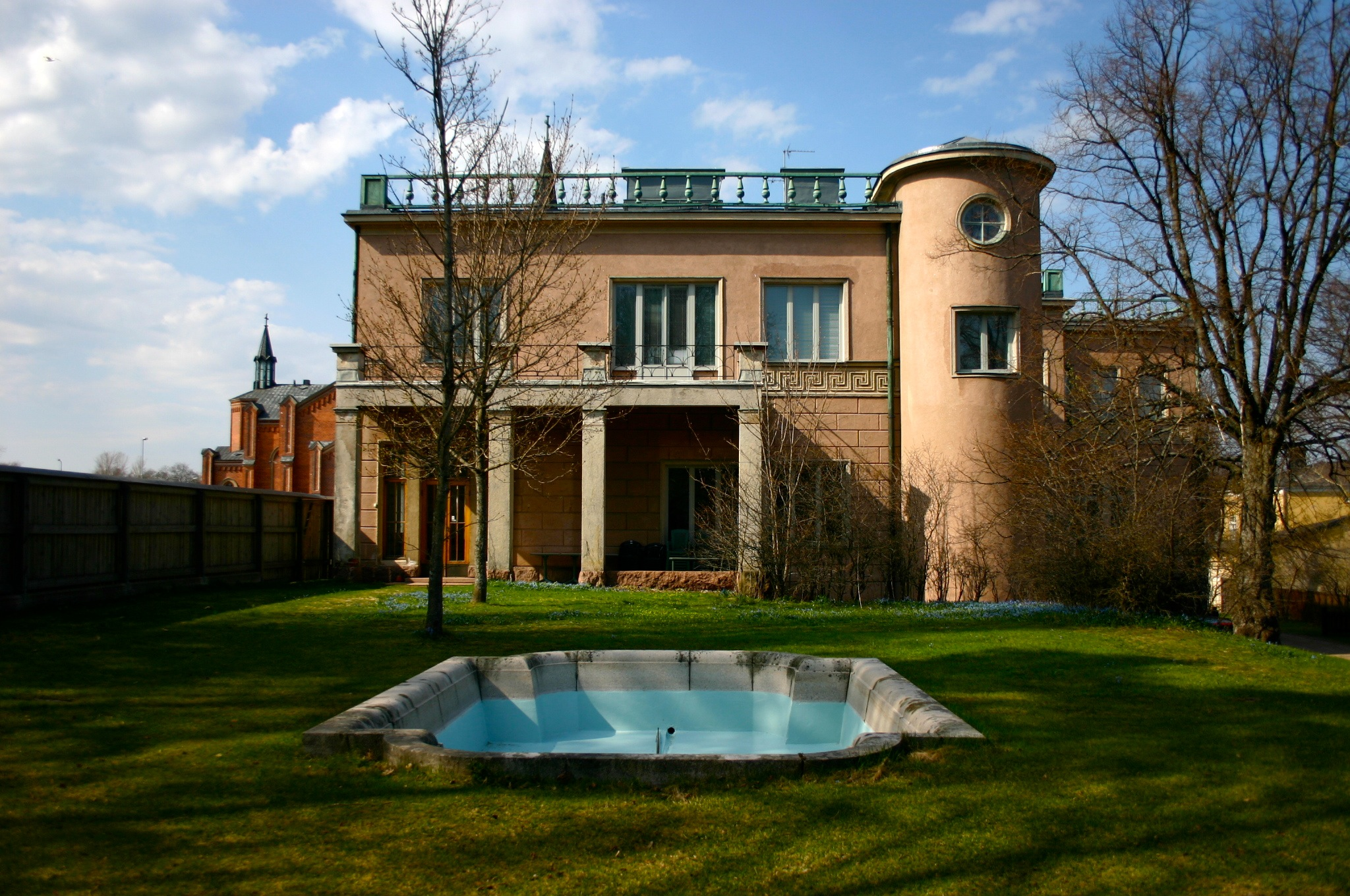
The Bonga castle.

All of the art galleries in Loviisa that are open all year round are located in the city centre. Galleria Theodor is an exhibition space operated by the association Loviisan taideyhdistys ry. The renovated Almintalo house hosts both exhibitions and various cultural events. The colourful home gallery of professor and artist Riitta Nelimarkka is located in the Bonga castle. Galleri Emilie hosts art by Kristina Elo and also works as a frame building workshop.

In summertime there are exhibitions at Laivasilta, at Galleria Saltbodan and in the granary of Klassiset Veneet ry. There are also summer exhibitions in the galleries of the Strömfors ironworks on Tallinmäki. The Zabludowicz Collection hosted in Sarvisalo is very rarely open to the public.

There is also an active photography club in the city - Loviisan Kameraseura - with its own convention space and studio in the Meijeri building on Chiewitzinkatu. Photographs by club members are constantly shown at the Safcafe in Kuningattarenportti, and the club also publishes a free-of-charge magazine called Loisto. Both the photography club and the art association hold courses, and visual art can also be studied at the Loviisa art school.

=== Music and dance ===
The music academy of the Porvoo region also offers education in Loviisa. The academy has its own premises in the Sibeliustalo building near the church. The education is directed to both children and youth as well as adults, and the academy cooperates with local schools and kindergartens. There are numerous Finnish and Swedish speaking choirs in Loviisa, and the music academy has a bilingual children's choir. The city orchestra of Loviisa was founded in 1888, and now works as a hobby-based wind instrument orchestra.

The Loviisa dance academy is an advocacy association founded in 2007. It offers a hobby possibility for all ages, and teaches children's dance, modern dance and classic ballet. The main premises of the dance academy are located in the city centre.

=== Theatre ===
Loviisa does not have a city theatre, the nearest one is located in Kotka. However there are several summer and hobbyist theatres in Loviisa. The Loviisa theatre is a hobbyist theatre founded in 1978. It has no permanent premises or scene, but instead holds performances all over the municipality. The Ruukinmylly summer theatre, calling itself a professional theatre, is active at the Strömfors ironworks. It has a roofed stand with 240 seats.

The Swedish-speaking Lurens sommarteater is active in the village of Hardom, and is particularly known for its rotating stand. The theatre is a hobbyist theatre but its directors are professionals. In Liljendal local theatre hobbyists perform an annual revue in the local Swedish dialect. Both the Loviisa theatre and the Loviisa art academy hold theatre courses in the city.

== Healthcare ==
There is a municipal health centre near the city centre with a hospital departments with 25 patient beds. The health centre is only on call duty at office hours, but Loviisa citizens can also seek care at the Kymenlaakso central hospital. Loviisa is part of the Helsinki and Uusimaa Hospital District (HUS). Starting from 2023, the wellbeing services county of Eastern Uusimaa will take responsibility of public healthcare. Both the public and the private sector offer physiotherapy and dental care. There is also a Mehiläinen work healthcare station in the city centre.

== Rescue ==
Rescue operations in Loviisa are handled by the rescue department of Eastern Uusimaa. There are ten voluntary fire brigades in the Loviisa area, and Fortum has its own industrial fire brigade for the Loviisa Nuclear Power Plant.

== Transport ==
Highway 6, which runs northwards towards Kouvola and Lappeenranta, branches off at the former Pernå municipality from Highway 7 (E18) between Porvoo and Loviisa.

== Politics ==
Loviisa is led by a town council with 35 members. Following the 2025 municipal election, the Swedish People's Party remains the largest party in the council, although it doesn't have an outright majority as before (2017-2021 council). The current distribution of the council's seats is:

- Swedish People's Party 15 seats
- Social Democratic Party 8 seats
- National Coalition Party 6 seats
- Centre Party 3 seats
- Left Alliance 2 seats
- Green League 1 seat

== Notable people ==
- Toivo Mäkelä (1909–1979), actor
- Jaana Toivari-Viitala (1964–2017), egyptologist
- Eva Wahlström (born 1980), professional boxer
- Victoria Åberg (1824–1892), painter

Mikael Agricola, the father of the Finnish literary language, was born in the village of Torsby in Pernå, which now belongs to Loviisa.

== Twin towns – sister cities ==
Town twinning in Finland started from Nordic cooperation. In addition to municipalities and municipal organisations, the citizens' organisation Pohjola-Norden has been an active participant, and also has a local organisation in Loviisa. During the last decades town twinning has also spread to other countries, which in the case of Loviisa include Estonia and Hungary.

Loviisa is twinned with:

- Fjallabyggð (Ólafsfjörður), Iceland
- Haapsalu, Estonia
- Hillerød, Denmark
- Horten, Norway
- Karlskrona, Sweden
- Kohila, Estonia
- Paks, Hungary
- Varash, Ukraine

== Gallery ==
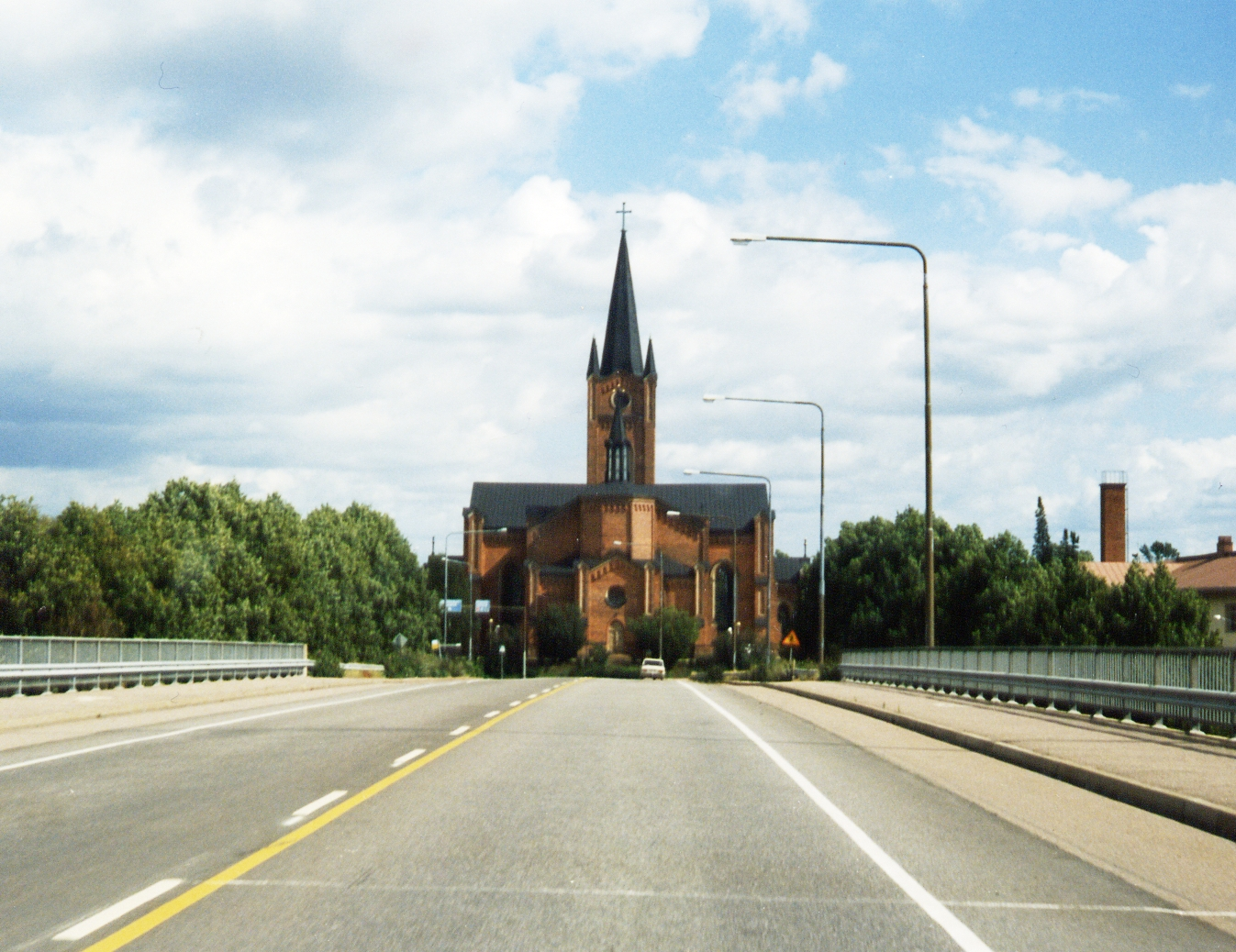
The Church of Loviisa

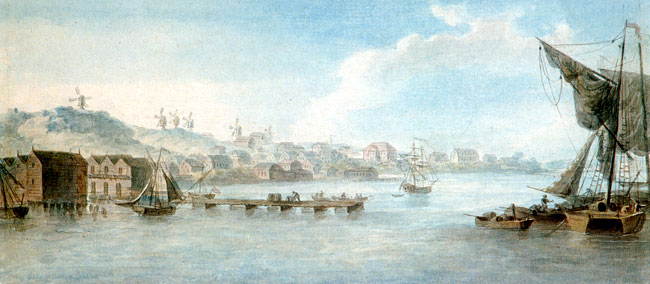
The harbor of Loviisa in 1808 by Gavril Sergeyev

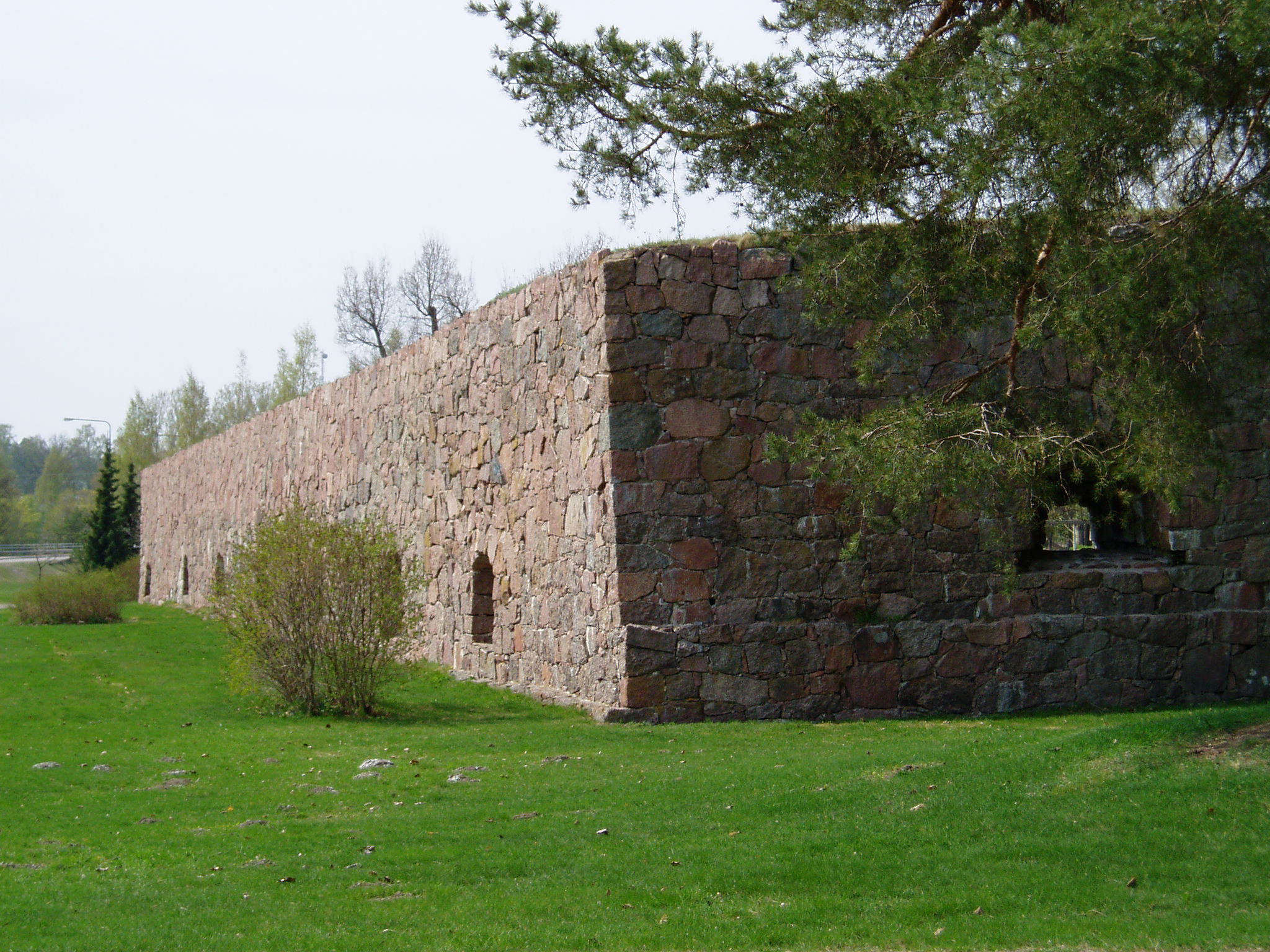
Loviisa Fortress

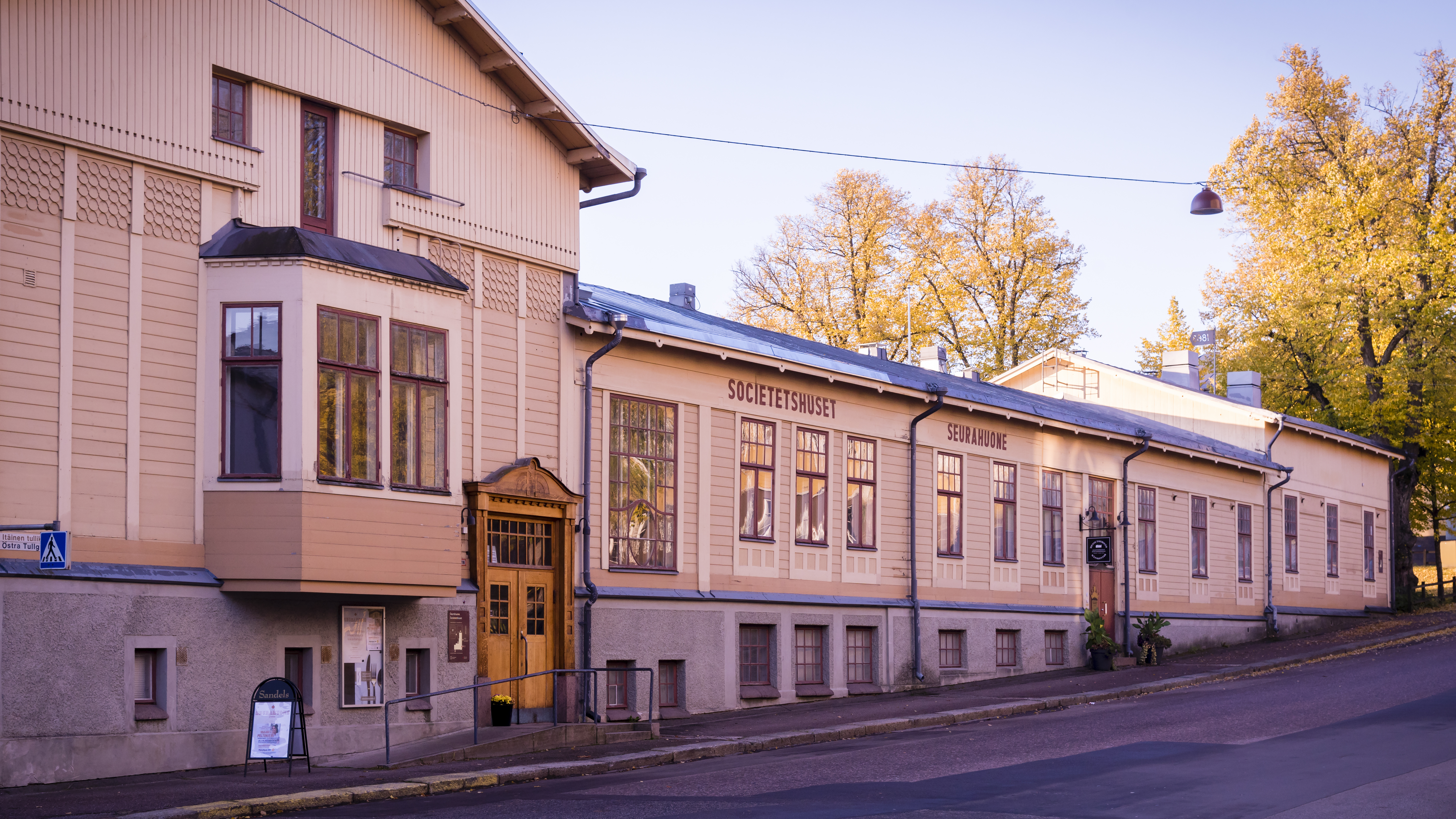
Loviisa Club Room (Chiewitz 1863)

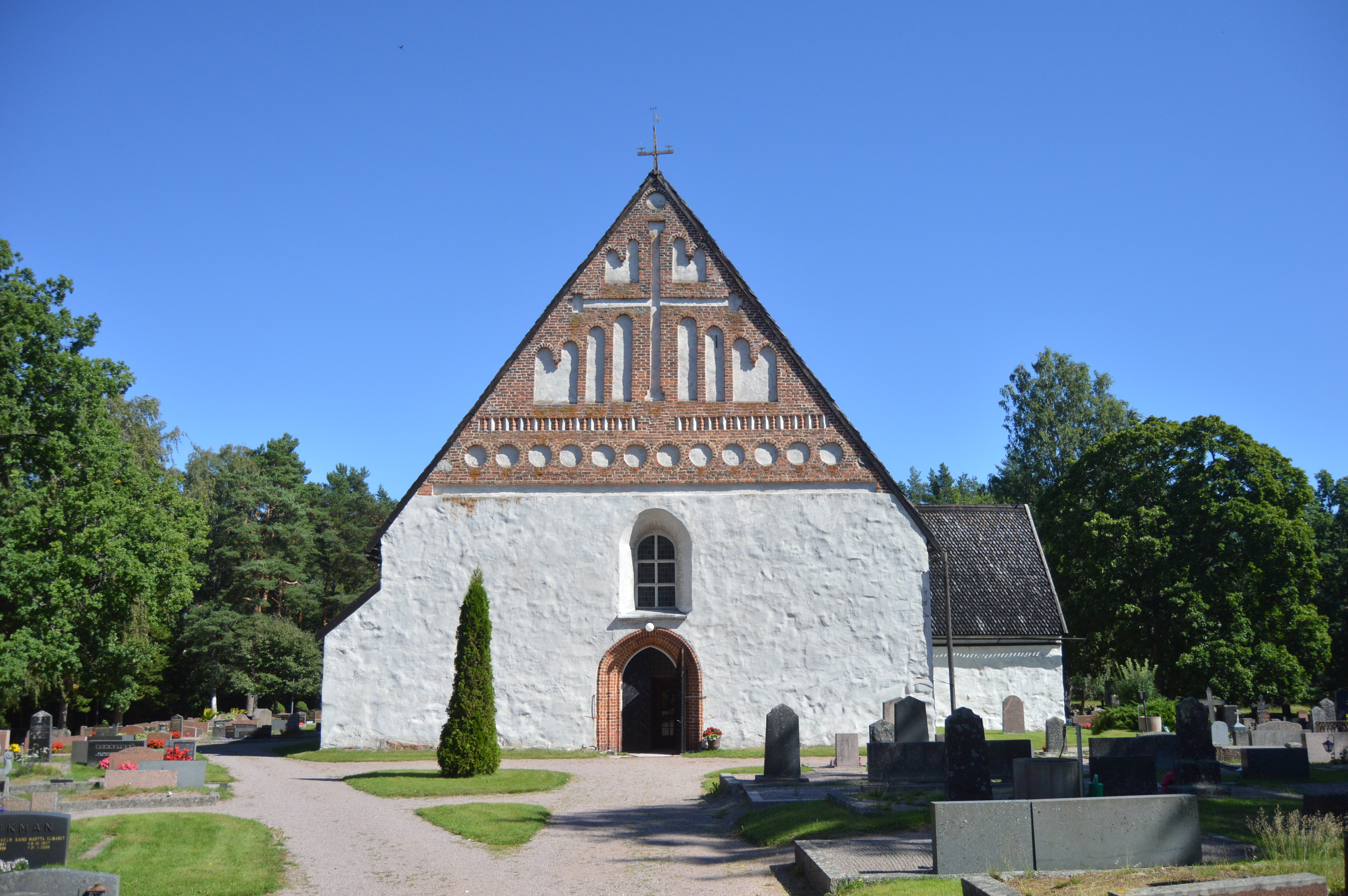
The Pernå Church (15th century)

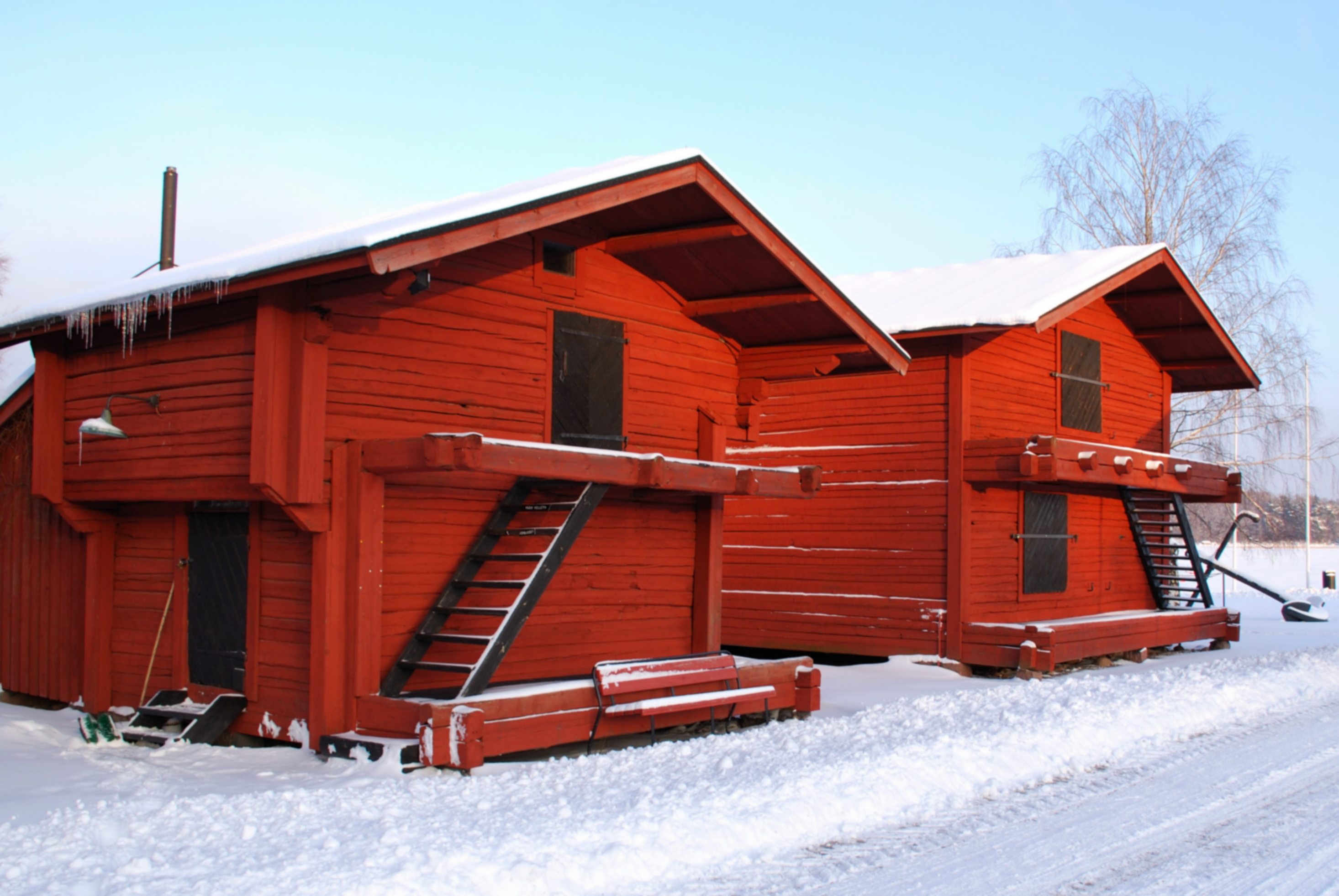
Laivasilta

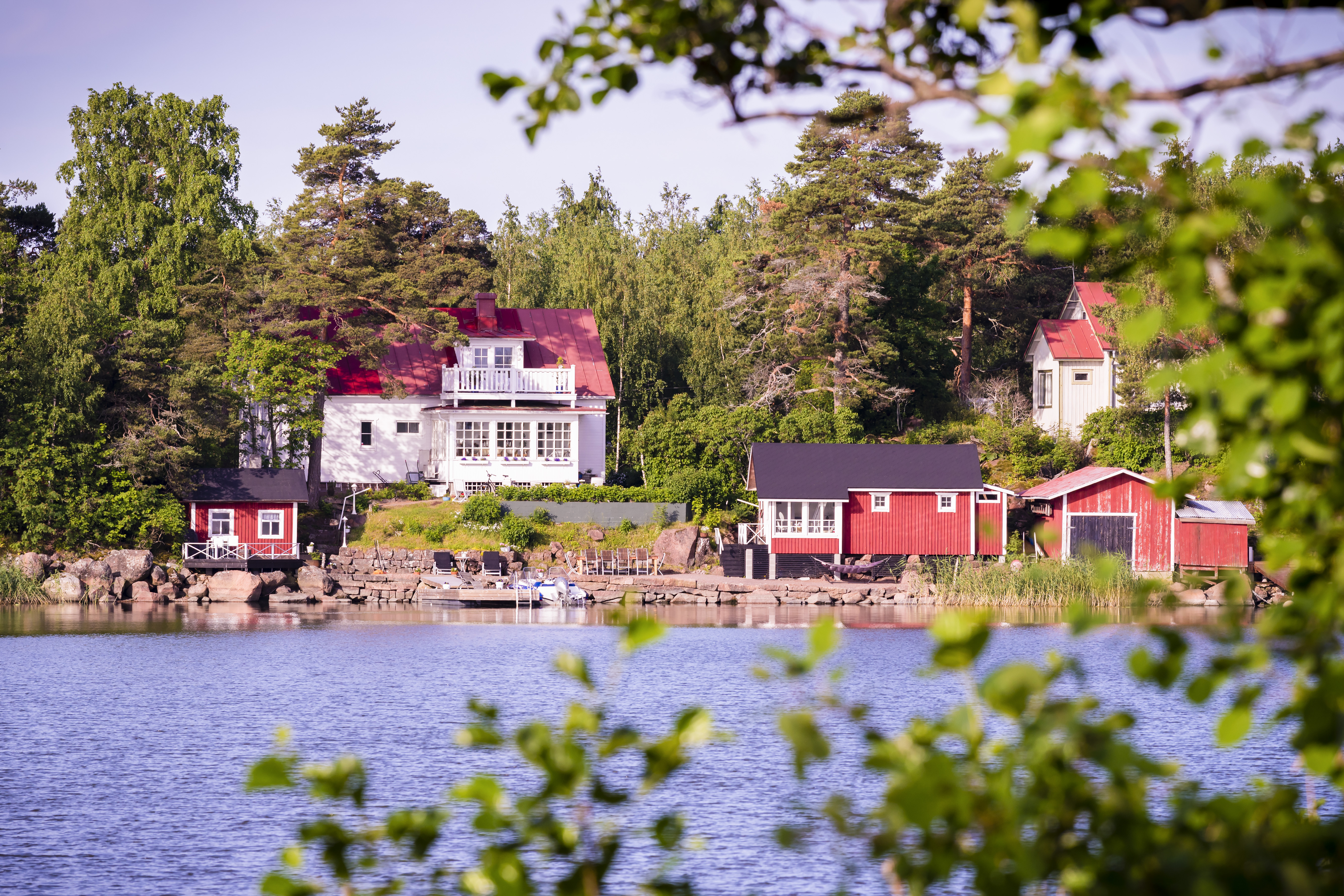
Pitkäsaari

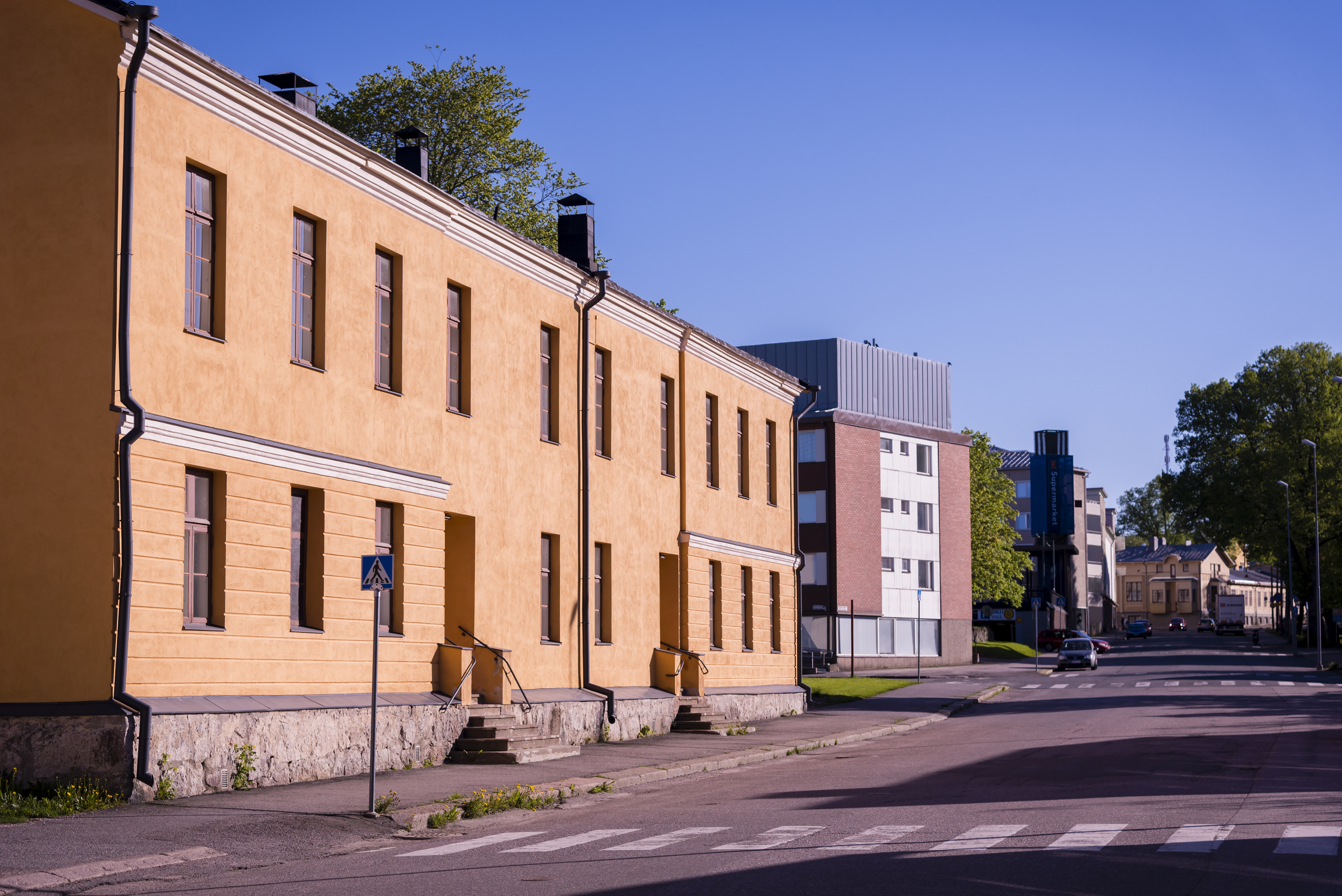
Officers' barracks (1754–1755)

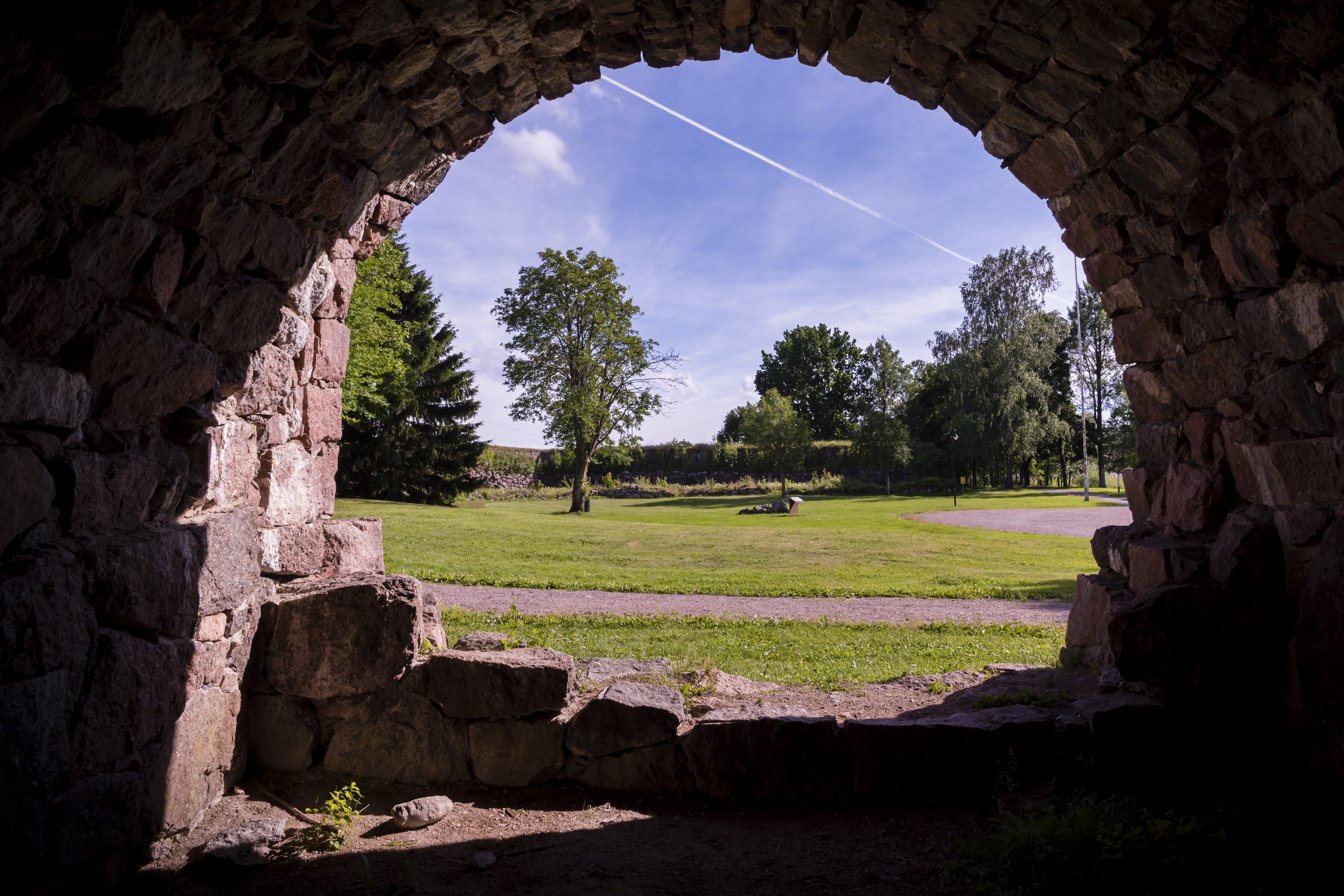
Fortress Bastion Ungern

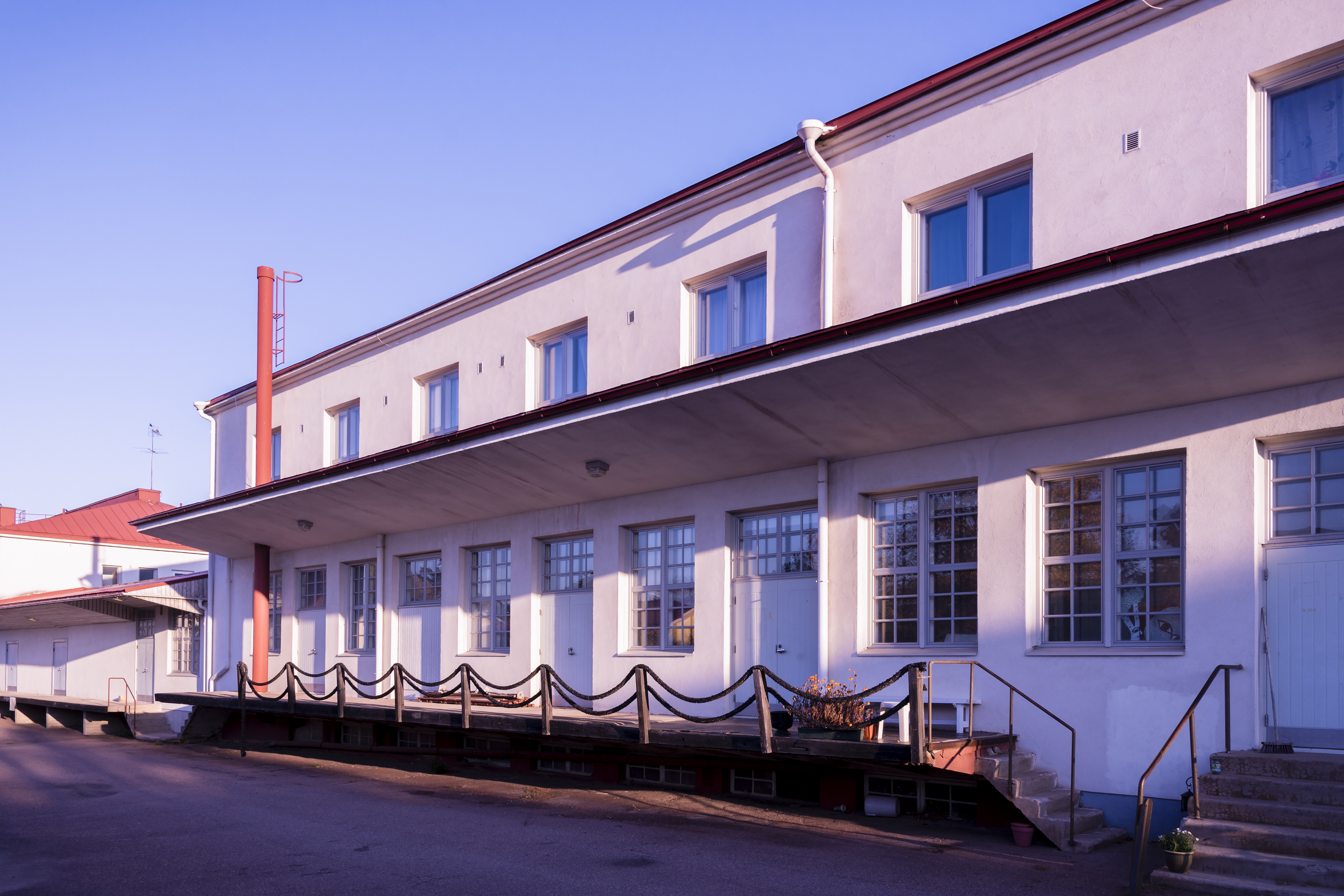
Vanha Meijeri

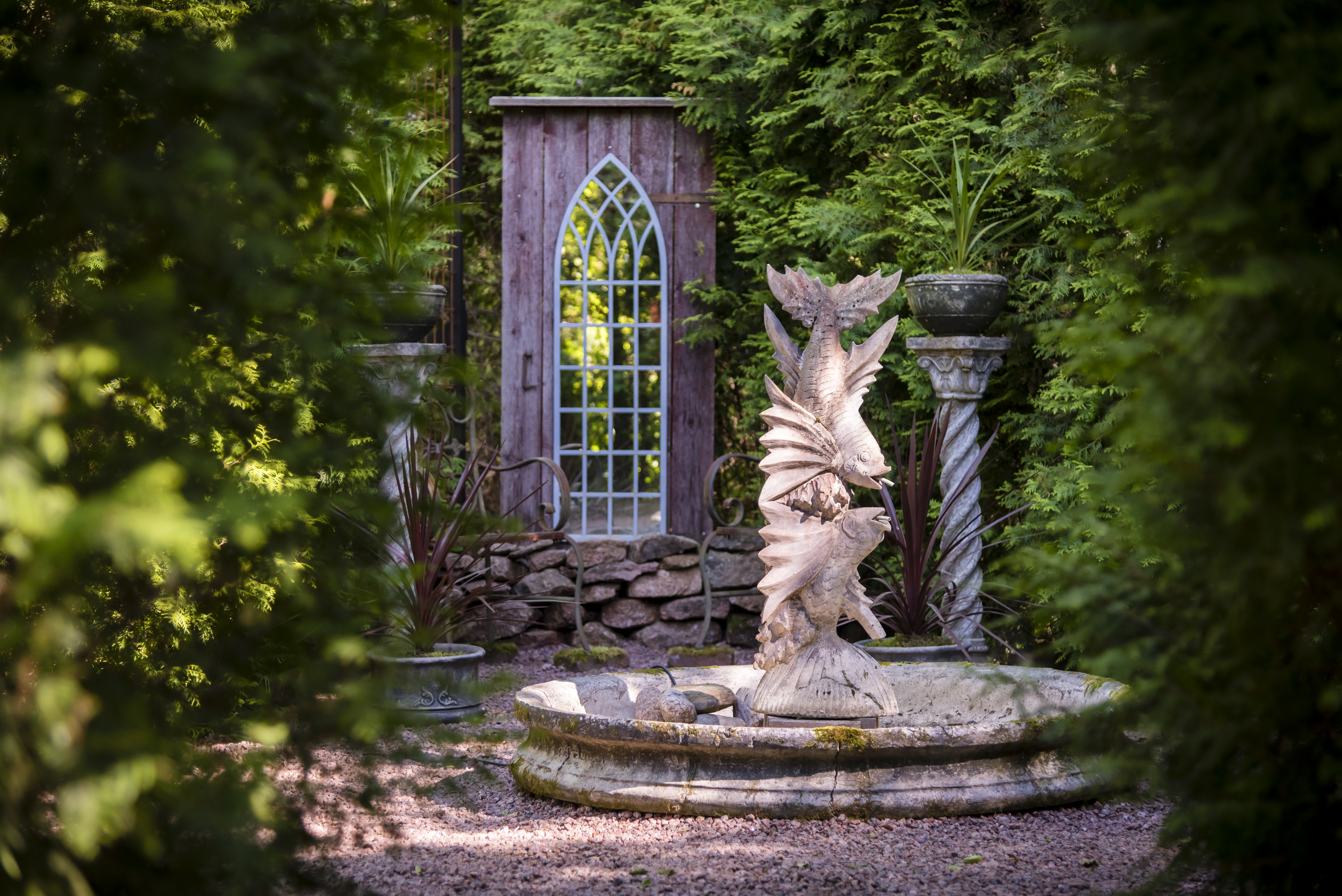
Eija's Garden

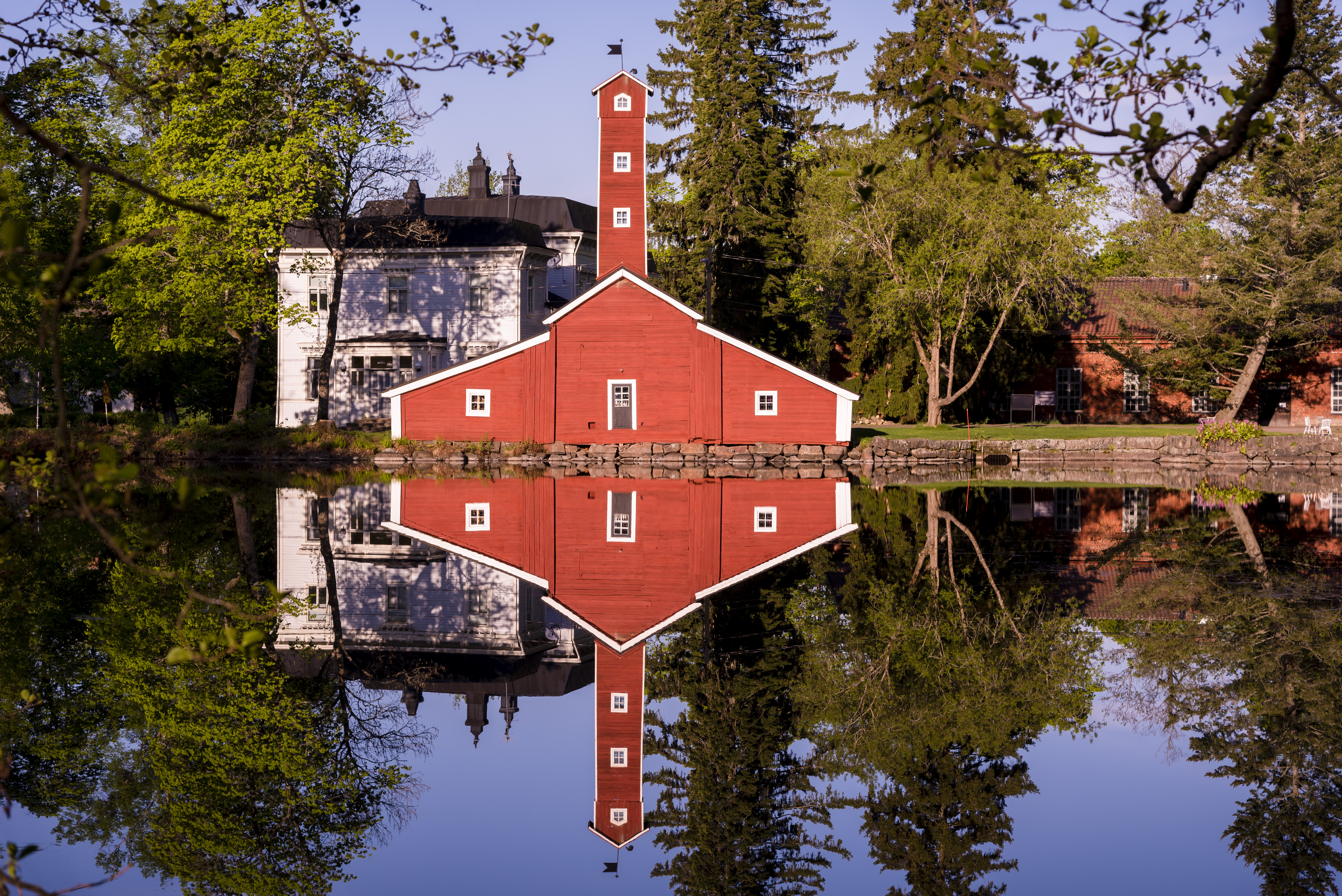
Strömfors ironworks

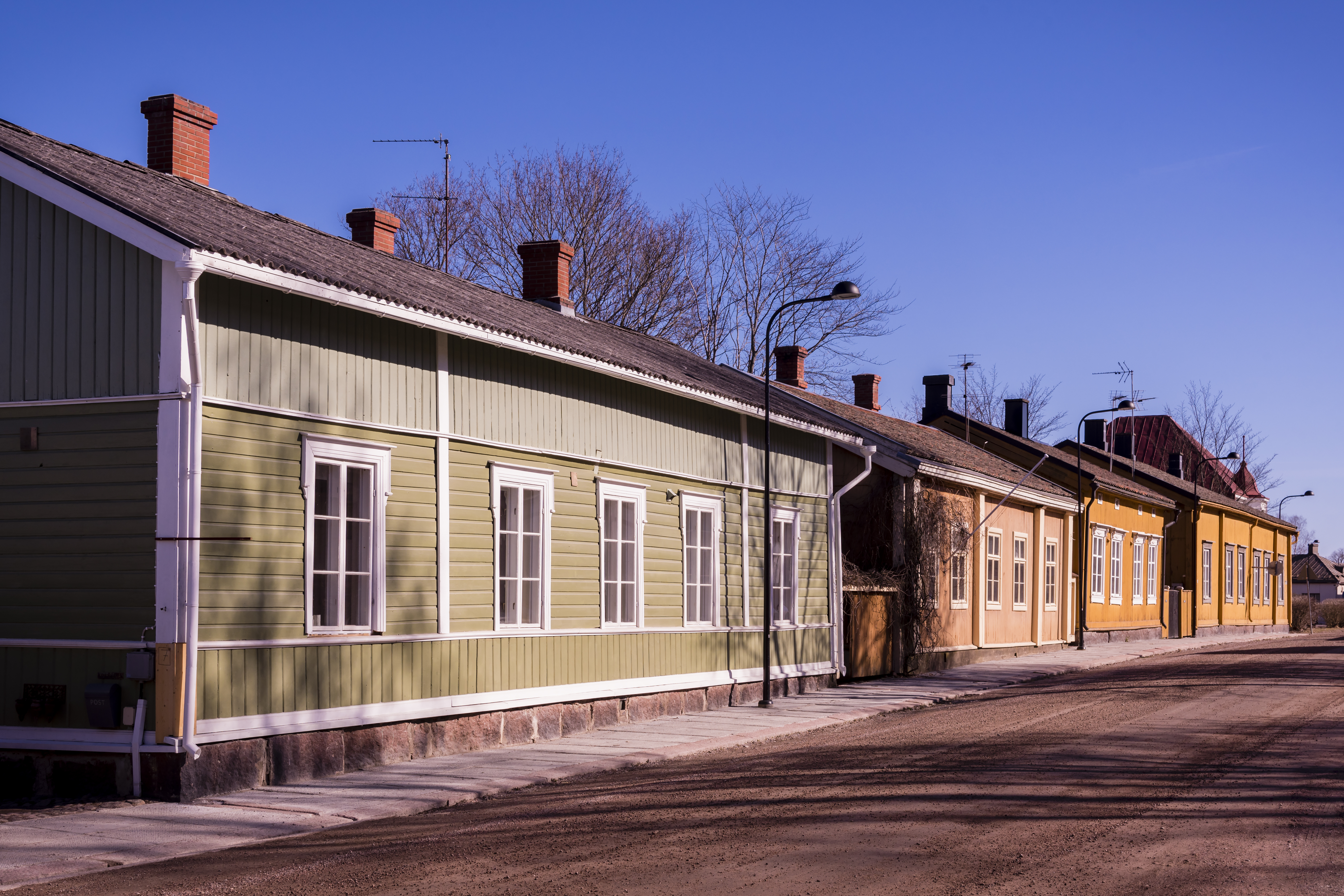
Alakaupunki

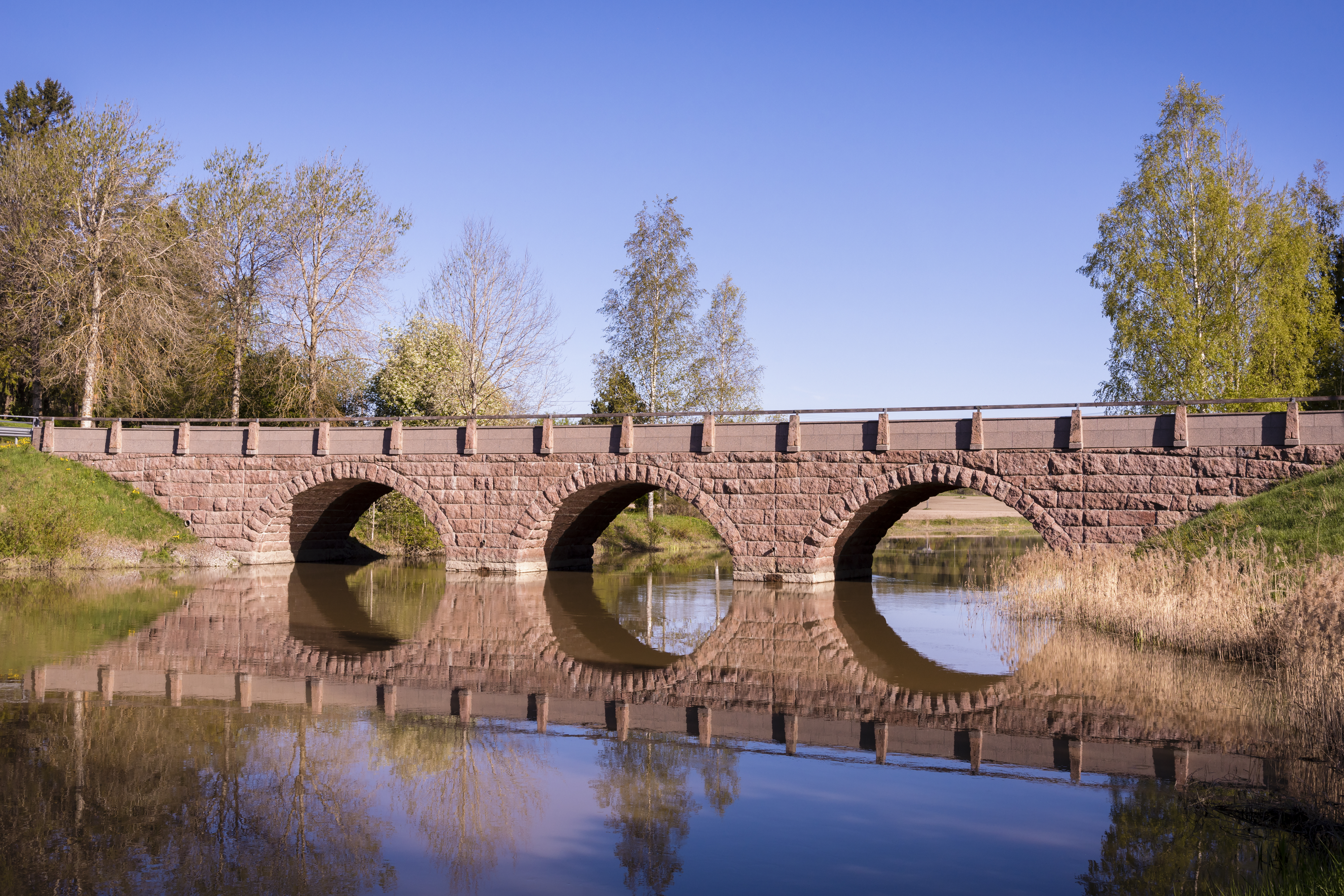
Liljendal bridge

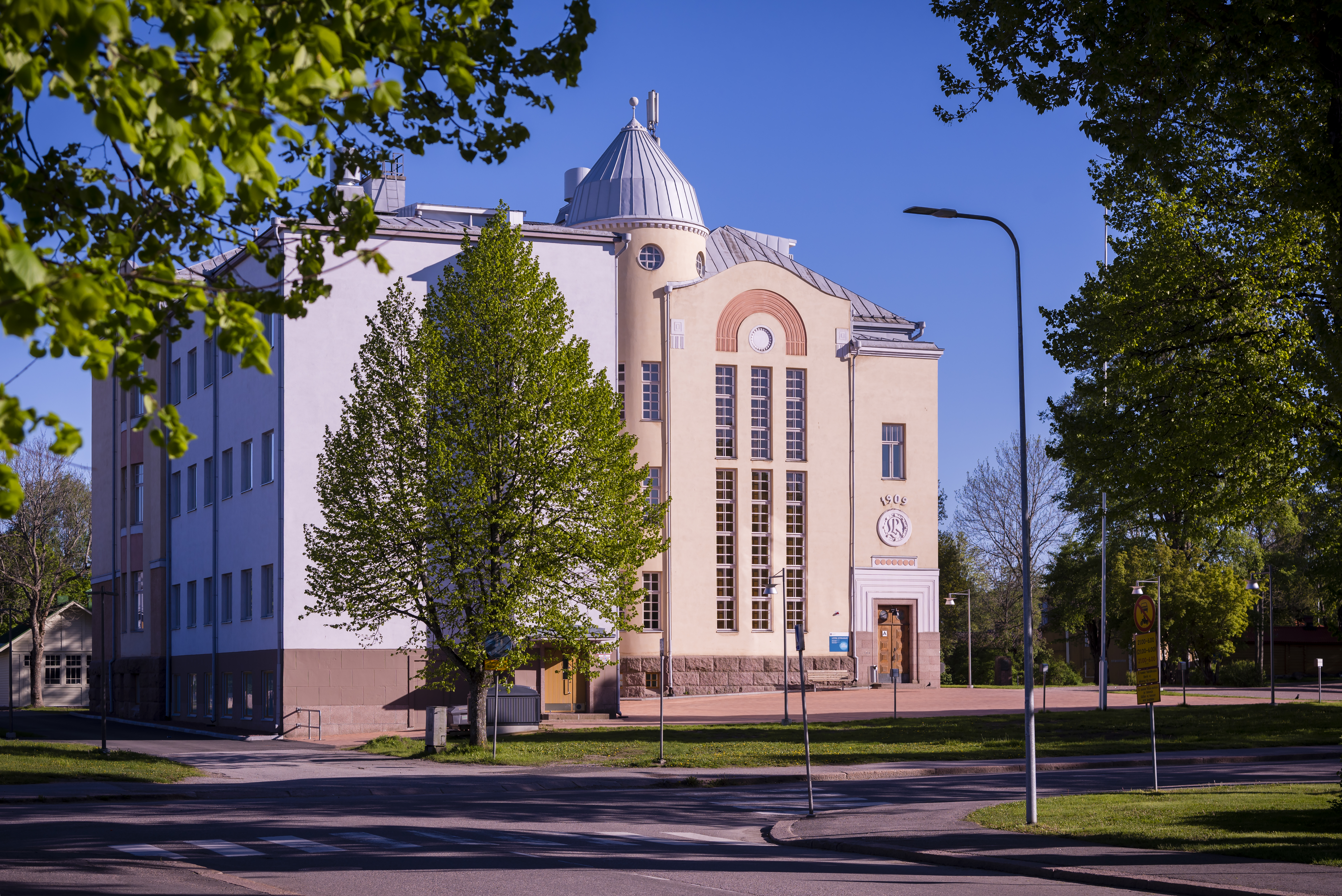
Lovisa Gymnasium

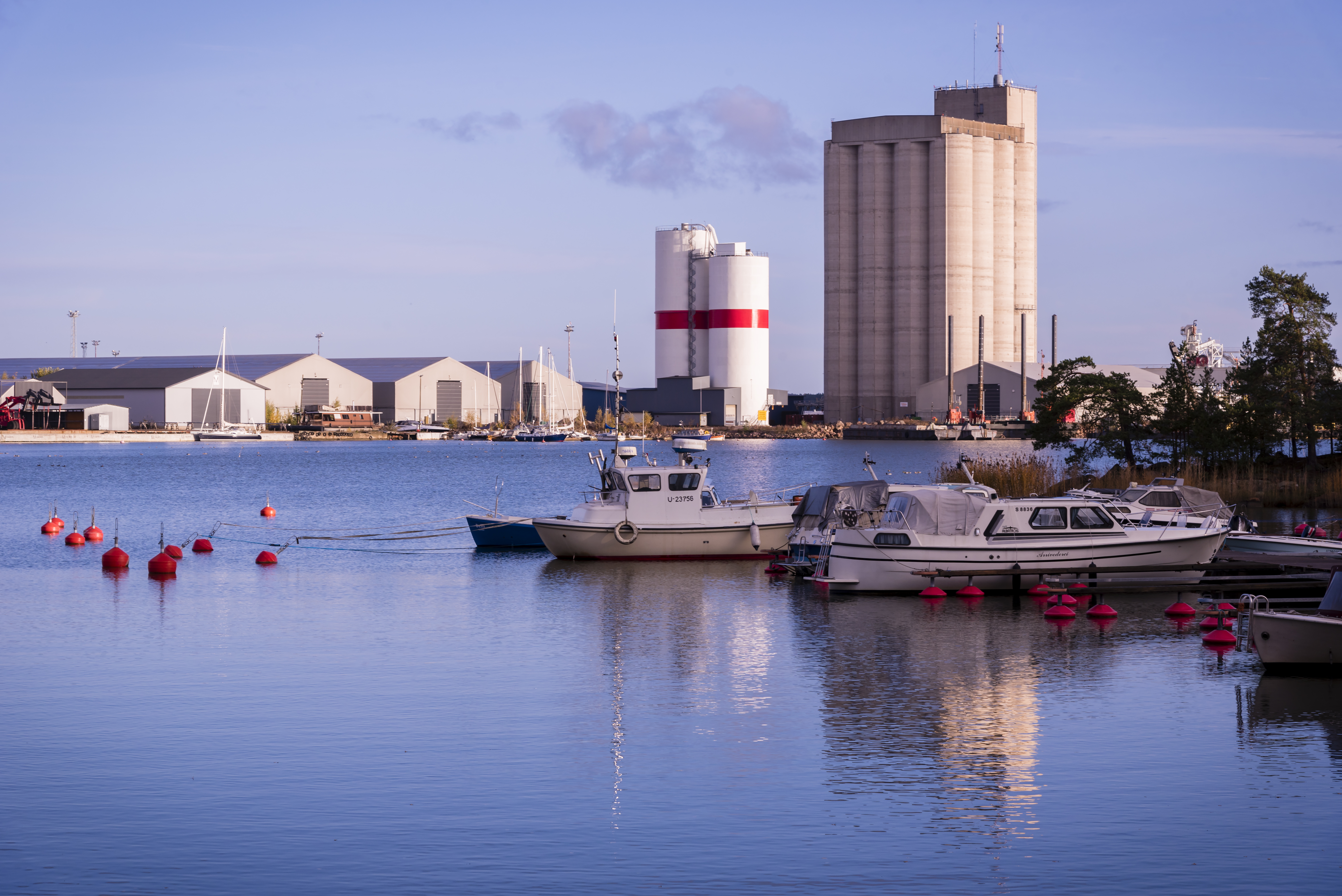
Valko granary silos
