= Tammijärvi =

Lake in Finland

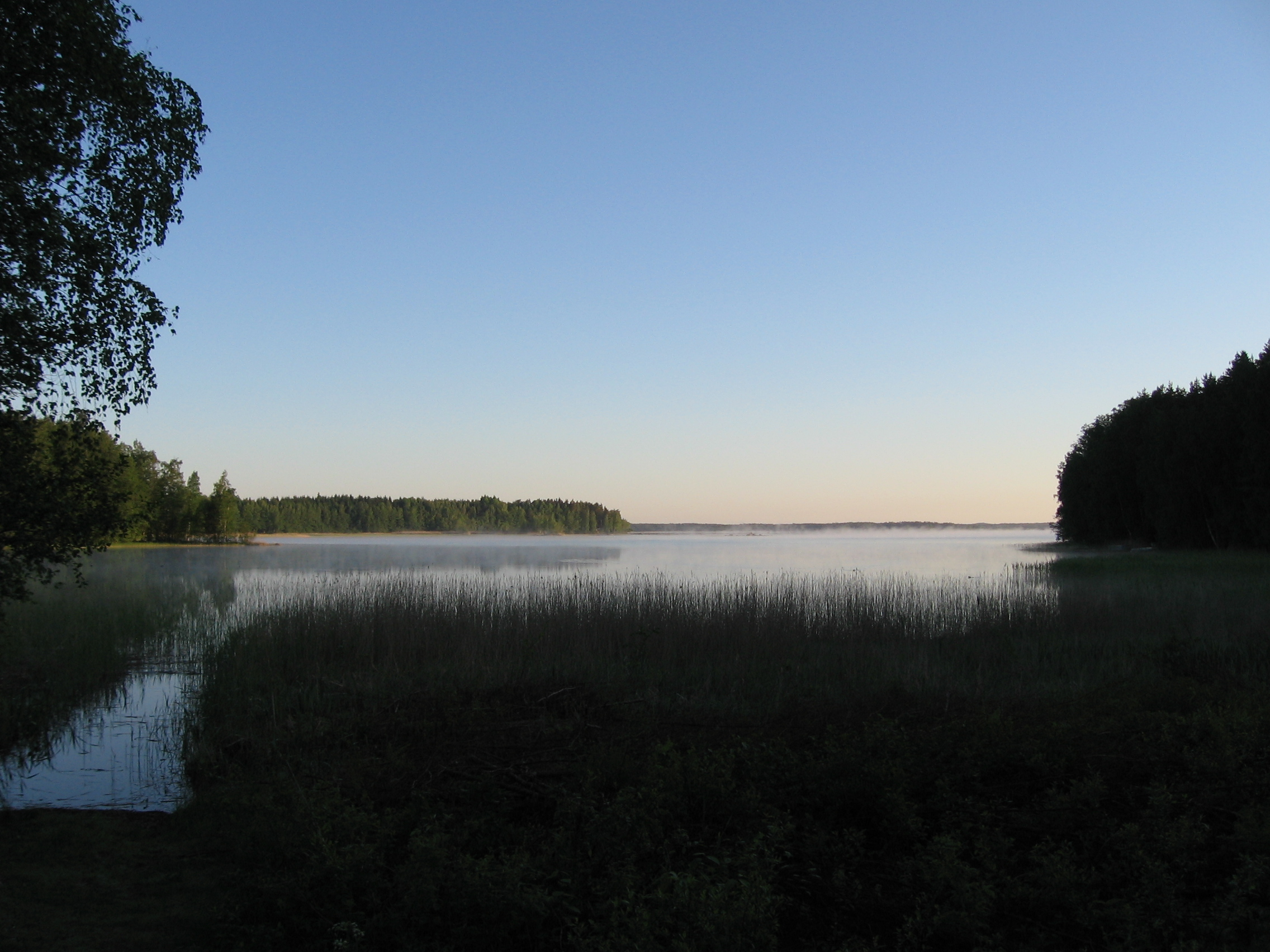

- Location within Finland
- Coordinates: 60°35′N 26°33′E
- Basin countries: Finland
- Surface area: 9.96 square kilometres (3.85 sq mi)
- Average depth: 2.2 metres (7 ft 3 in)
- Max. depth: 14.5 metres (48 ft)
- Surface elevation: 14.8 metres (49 ft)
- Islands: 27

Tammijärvi is a lake in Finland, located on the border of Uusimaa and Kymenlaakso. It spans the municipalities of Loviisa, Pyhtää and Kouvola.
