= Niemi (surname) =

Niemi is a Finnish surname of Laine type literally meaning "peninsula", "cape", etc.

- Aleksi Niemi (born 1995), Finnish orienteering competitor
- Antti Niemi, multiple people
- Antti-Jussi Niemi (born 1977), Finnish ice hockey defenceman
- Bruce Niemi (1949–2025), American politician
- Einar Niemi (born 1943), Norwegian historian
- Eliza Niemi, Canadian indie pop singer-songwriter and cellist
- Erkki Niemi (born 1962), Finnish high jumper
- Esko Niemi (1934–2013), Finnish ice hockey player
- Jaakko Niemi (born 1961), Finnish biathlete
- Janice Niemi (1928–2020), American lawyer and politician
- Jari Niemi (born 1977), Finnish footballer
- Jarkko Niemi, multiple people
- Jyri Niemi (born 1990), Finnish ice hockey defenseman
- Kai Niemi (born 1955), Finnish motorcycle speedway rider
- Laurie Niemi (1925–1968), American footballer
- Lisa Niemi (born 1956), Finnish-American actress and dancer
- Masa Niemi (1914–1960), Finnish actor
- Matti Niemi, multiple people
- Miia Niemi (born 1983), Finnish footballer
- Miika Niemi (born 1994), Finnish footballer
- Mika Niemi (born 1988), Finnish ice hockey forward
- Mikael Niemi (born 1959), Swedish author
- Mikko Niemi, multiple people
- Pekka Niemi, multiple people
- Pentti Niemi, (1902–1962), Finnish Lutheran clergyman and politician
- Pyry Niemi, Swedish politician
- Reino Niemi, (1914–1966), Finnish chess player
- Robert Niemi (1955–2022), American literary scholar, literary critic and author
- Shane Niemi (born 1978), Canadian sprints athlete
- Timo Niemi (born 1966), Finnish wrestler
- Toni Niemi (born 1985), Finnish ice hockey defenseman
- Trey Niemi (born 1998), Finnish basketball player
- Veijo Niemi (born 1954), Finnish politician
- Venla Niemi (born 1990), Finnish orienteering competitor
- Virpi Niemi (born 1966), Finnish cross country skier

== See also ==
- Nieminen, the corresponding surname of Virtanen type
