= Nieminen =

- Language: Finnish

Origin
- Meaning: derived from niemi ("peninsula") and -nen
- Region of origin: Finland

Nieminen is a surname of Virtanen type originating in Finland (in Finnish, niemi means "peninsula", '-nen' is a surname-deriving suffix), where it is the third most common surname.

- Aimo Nieminen (1940–2018), Finnish weightlifter
- Anssi Nieminen, Finnish ski jumper
- Antti Nieminen (1928–1972), Finnish footballer
- Anu Nieminen (born 1977), badminton player
- Eeti Nieminen (1927–2016), Nordic skier
- Ensio Nieminen (1930–2008), Finnish cyclist
- Ilpo Nieminen (born 1961), Finnish sprint canoer
- Jani Nieminen (born 1987), Finnish ice hockey goaltender
- Jarkko Nieminen (born 1981), tennis player
- Jyri Nieminen (born 1987), Finnish football coach and former player
- Jyrki Nieminen (born 1951), Finnish footballer
- Kai Nieminen (born 1950), Finnish writer and recipient
- Kalle Nieminen (1878–1943), Finnish long-distance runner
- Kauko Nieminen (1929–2010), natural scientist and eccentric
- Kauko Nieminen (born 1979), speedway rider
- Lasse Nieminen (born 1966), ice hockey player
- Lotta Nieminen (born 1986), Finnish illustrator and graphic designer
- Martti Nieminen (1891–1963), wrestler
- Mika Nieminen (born 1966), ice hockey player
- Minna Nieminen (born 1976), Finnish rower
- Niilo Nieminen (1907–1988), Finnish smallholder and politician
- Niko Nieminen (born 1982), ice hockey player
- Otto Nieminen (born 1996), Finnish ice hockey player
- Pertti Nieminen (1936–2016), ice hockey player
- Pertti Neumann (born 1959, formerly Pertti Nieminen), musician
- Petra Nieminen (born 1999), Finnish ice hockey player
- Pirkko Nieminen (1939–2022), Finnish gymnast
- Rami Nieminen (born 1966), football player
- Rauno Esa Nieminen (born 1955), musician, guitar maker and writer
- Riku Nieminen (born 1986), Finnish actor and dancer
- Samu Nieminen (born 1992), Finnish footballer
- Senni Nieminen (1905–1970), Finnish actress
- Tiina Nieminen (born 1979), Finnish racing cyclist
- Timo Nieminen (born 1981), tennis player
- Toni Nieminen (born 1975), ski jumper
- Tuomas Nieminen (born 1981), Finnish long track speed skater
- Tuure Nieminen (1894–1968), Finnish ski jumper
- Väinö Nieminen (1898–1979), Finnish agronomist, farmer and politician
- Veli Nieminen (1886–1936), gymnast and sports shooter
- Ville Nieminen (born 1977), ice hockey player

== See also ==
- Niemi, the corresponding surname of Laine type
