= Lusi (Heinola) =

Village in Heinola, Finland

Coordinates: 61.298°N 26.074°E

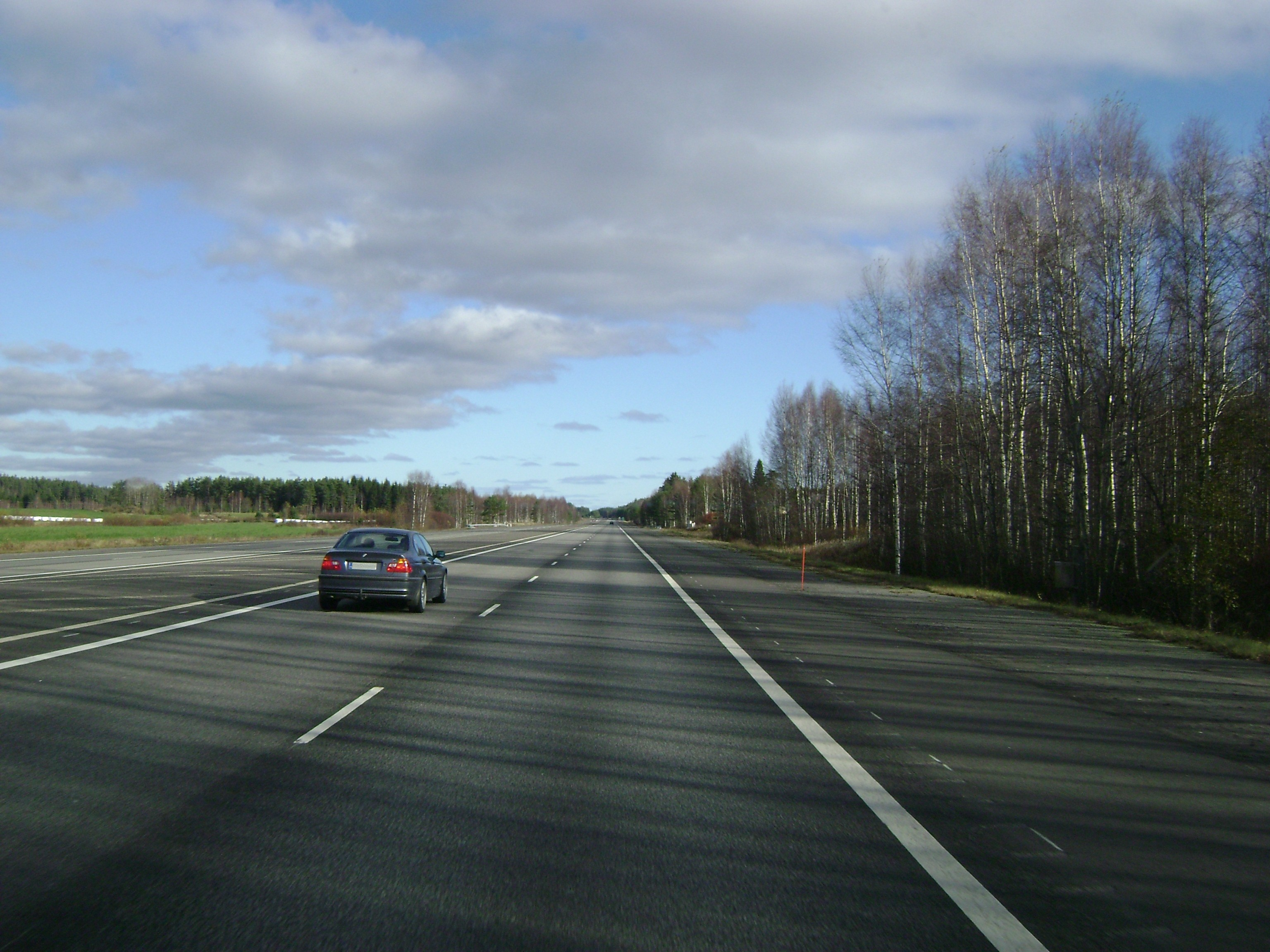

Lusi is a village (Finnish: kylä) located in the Finnish municipality Heinola in the Päijät-Häme region, in the former Province of Southern Finland. It is where Finnish national road 5 meets Finnish national road 4.

In 2009 Lusi was nominated village of the year.

== History ==
Lusi was first mentioned in 1470. It was originally a farm name, derived from a folk form of the Christian given name Ambrosius (Brusi > Blusi > Lusi).

Lusi was a part of Heinolan maalaiskunta until its consolidation with the town of Heinola in 1997.
