= Konnivesi =

Lake in Finland

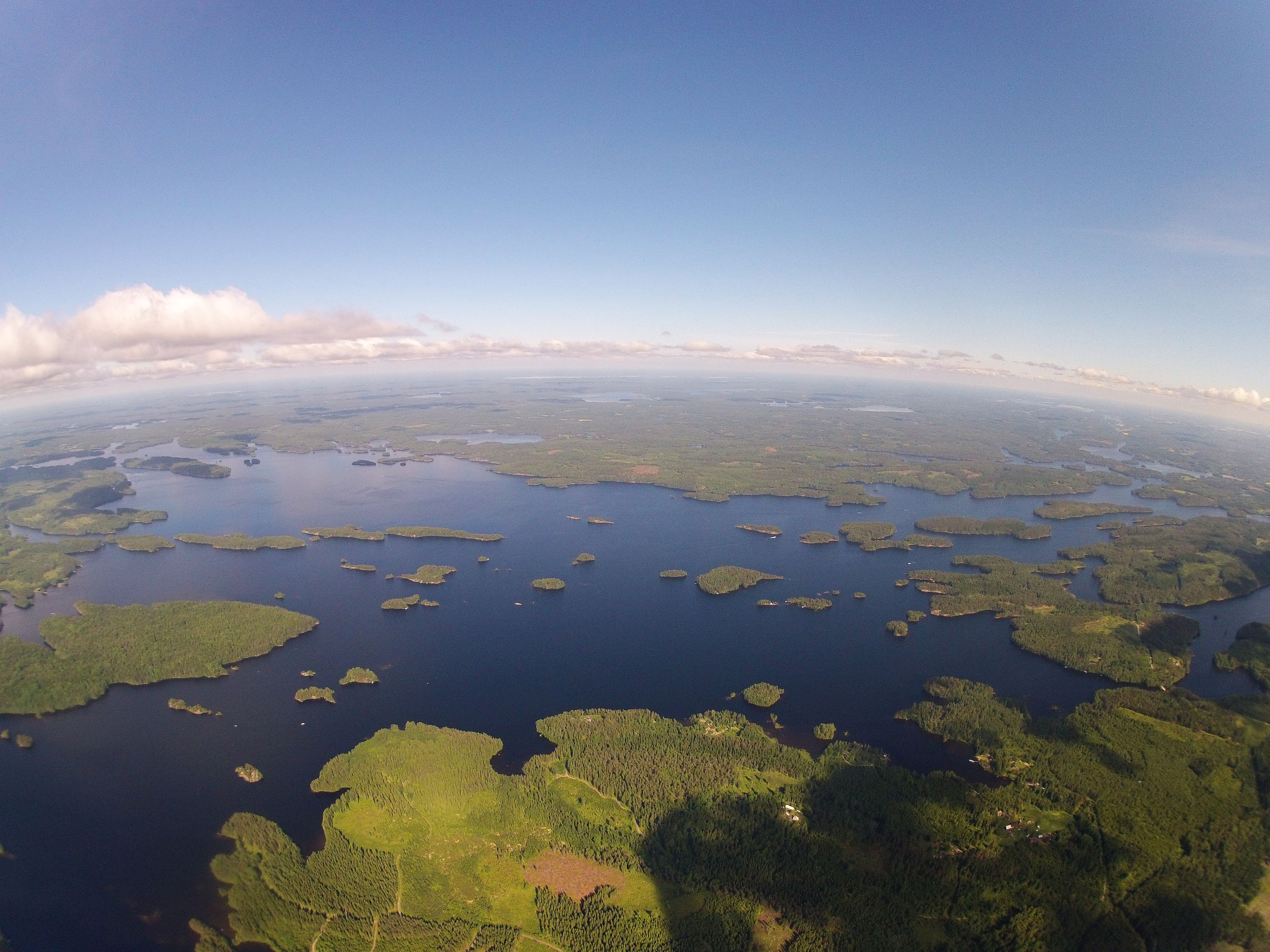

- Location within Finland
- Coordinates: 61°10′N 26°09′E
- Catchment area: Kymijoki
- Basin countries: Finland
- Surface area: 49.596 km^{2} (19.149 sq mi)
- Shore length^{1}: 319.88 km (198.76 mi)
- Surface elevation: 77.4 m (254 ft)
- Frozen: December–April
- Islands: Konnisaari, Vähäsaari
- Settlements: Heinola, Iitti
- ^{1} Shore length is not a well-defined measure.

Konnivesi is a medium-sized lake of Finland in the Kymijoki main catchment area. It is located partly in region Päijät-Häme, near the town Heinola, partly in region Kymenlaakso. There is a waterway crossing the Heinola town and connecting the lake to another lake Ruotsalainen.

== See also ==
- List of lakes in Finland
