= Niemi =

Niemi is a Finnish word meaning "peninsula". It may refer to:

- Niemi (surname)
- Niemi, Lahti, a district of the city of Lahti
- Niemi, part of Orimattila
- Niemi, part of Tampere
- Niemi, a village in Halsua
- Niemi, a village in Jokioinen
- Niemi, a village in the former municipality Sammatti, now part of the city of Lohja

== Other uses ==
- Niemi, a novel by Juha Hurme which was awarded the Finlandia Prize in 2017
