= Lake Ruotsalainen =

Lake in Heinola, Finland

Ruotsalainen
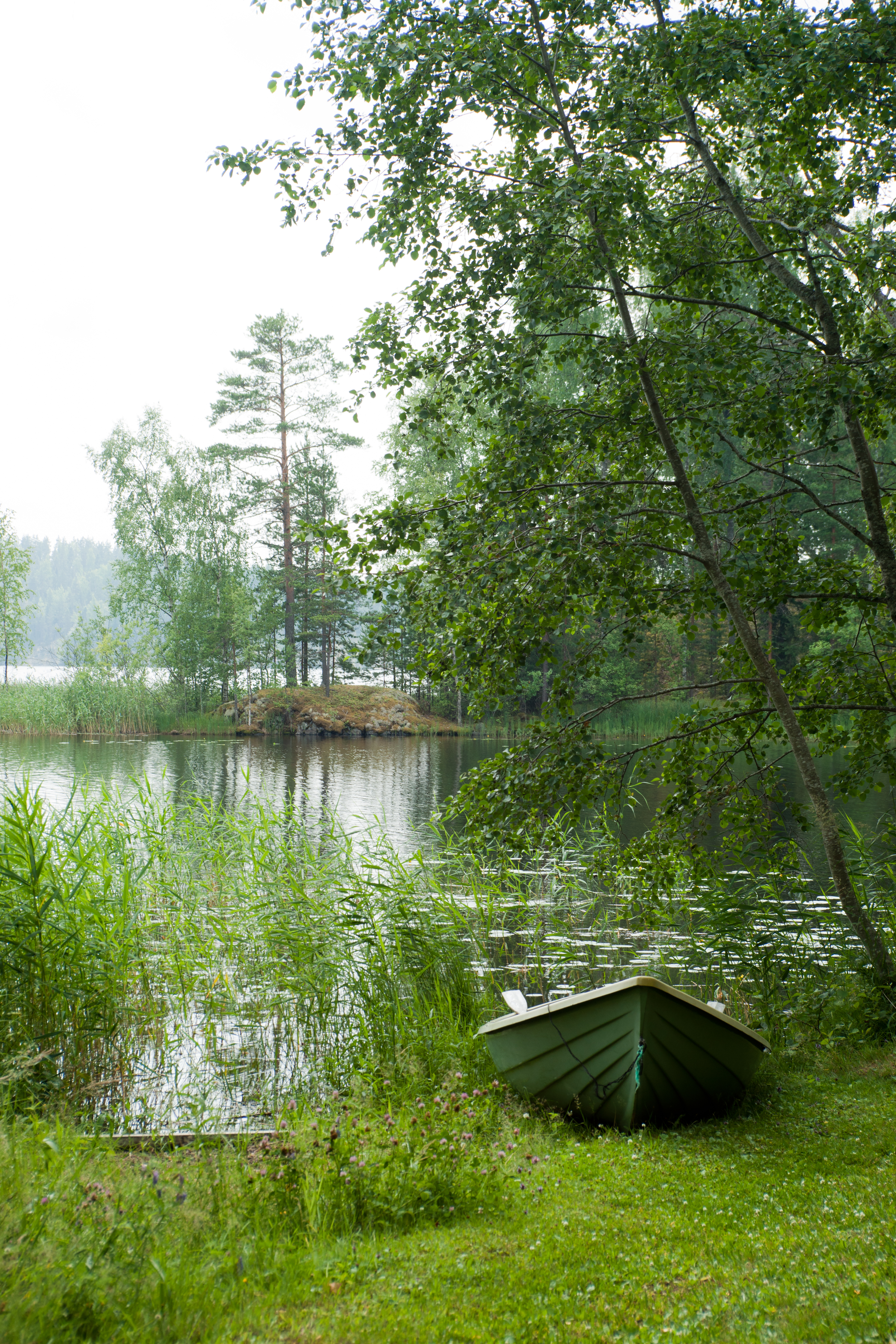

- Location within Finland
- Coordinates: 61°14′N 25°56′E
- Lake type: Natural
- Catchment area: Kymijoki
- Basin countries: Finland
- Surface area: 74.127 km^{2} (28.621 sq mi)
- Average depth: 9.87 m (32.4 ft)
- Max. depth: 56.43 m (185.1 ft)
- Water volume: 0.732 km^{3} (0.176 cu mi)
- Shore length^{1}: 350.71 km (217.92 mi)
- Surface elevation: 77.5 m (254 ft)
- Frozen: December-April
- Islands: Iso Pirttisaari, Hopeasaari
- Settlements: Heinola
- ^{1} Shore length is not a well-defined measure.

Ruotsalainen is a medium-sized lake of Finland in the Kymijoki main catchment area. it is located in Päijät-Häme, near the town Heinola. There is a waterway crossing the town and connecting the lake to another lake Konnivesi.

== See also ==
- List of lakes in Finland
