= Niilo Nieminen =

Finnish smallholder and politician (1907–1988)

Niilo Lauri Nieminen (21 December 1907 – 14 December 1988) was a Finnish smallholder and politician, born in Heinolan maalaiskunta. He was a member of the Parliament of Finland from 1948 to 1951, from 1952 to 1962 and from 1969 to 1975, representing the Finnish People's Democratic League (SKDL). Nieminen was a member of the Communist Party of Finland (SKP). He was a presidential elector in the 1950, 1956 and 1962 presidential elections.
