= Tähtiniemi Bridge =

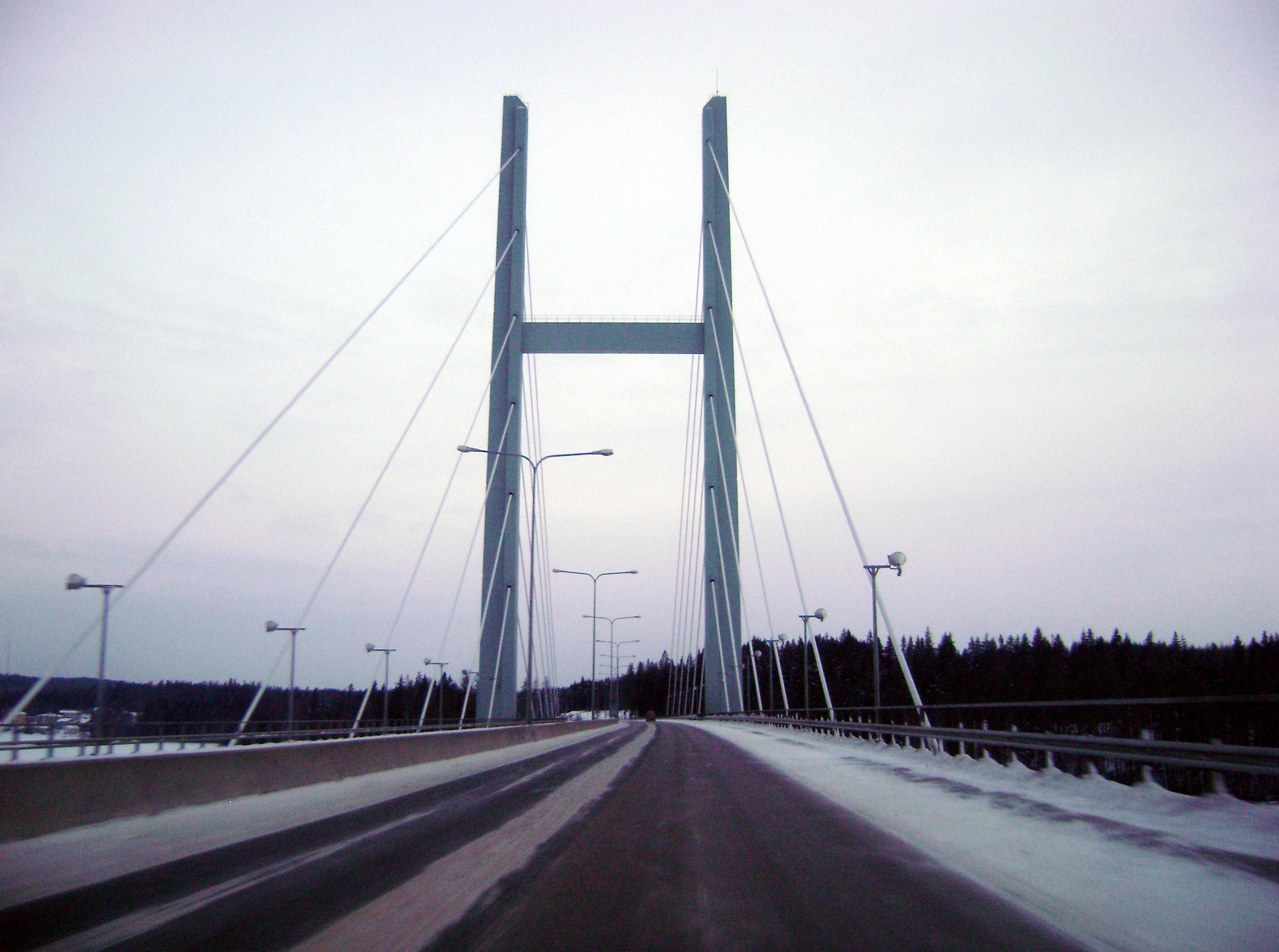
- Coordinates: 61°12′49″N 026°00′29″E
- Carries: Finnish national road 4 (E75)
- Crosses: Lake Ruotsalainen
- Locale: Heinola, Finland
- Official name: Tähtiniemen silta
- Maintained by: Finnish Transport Agency

Characteristics
- Design: cable-stayed harpform
- Total length: 924 m (3,031 ft)
- Width: 22.5 m (74 ft)
- Height: 105 m (344 ft)
- Longest span: 165 m (541 ft)
- Clearance below: 5.25 m (17.2 ft)

History
- Designer: Pekka Pulkkinen, WSP Finland
- Opened: November 1993

The Tähtiniemi Bridge (Finnish: Tähtiniemen silta, literally "Star Cape Bridge") is a cable-stayed harpform bridge in Heinola, Finland. It is 924 metres (3,031 ft) long and the second longest bridge of Finland. It carries the Finnish national road 4 (E75) across the Lake Ruotsalainen. The bridge was opened in November 1993.
