= Heinola =

- Town
- Heinolan kaupunki Heinola stad
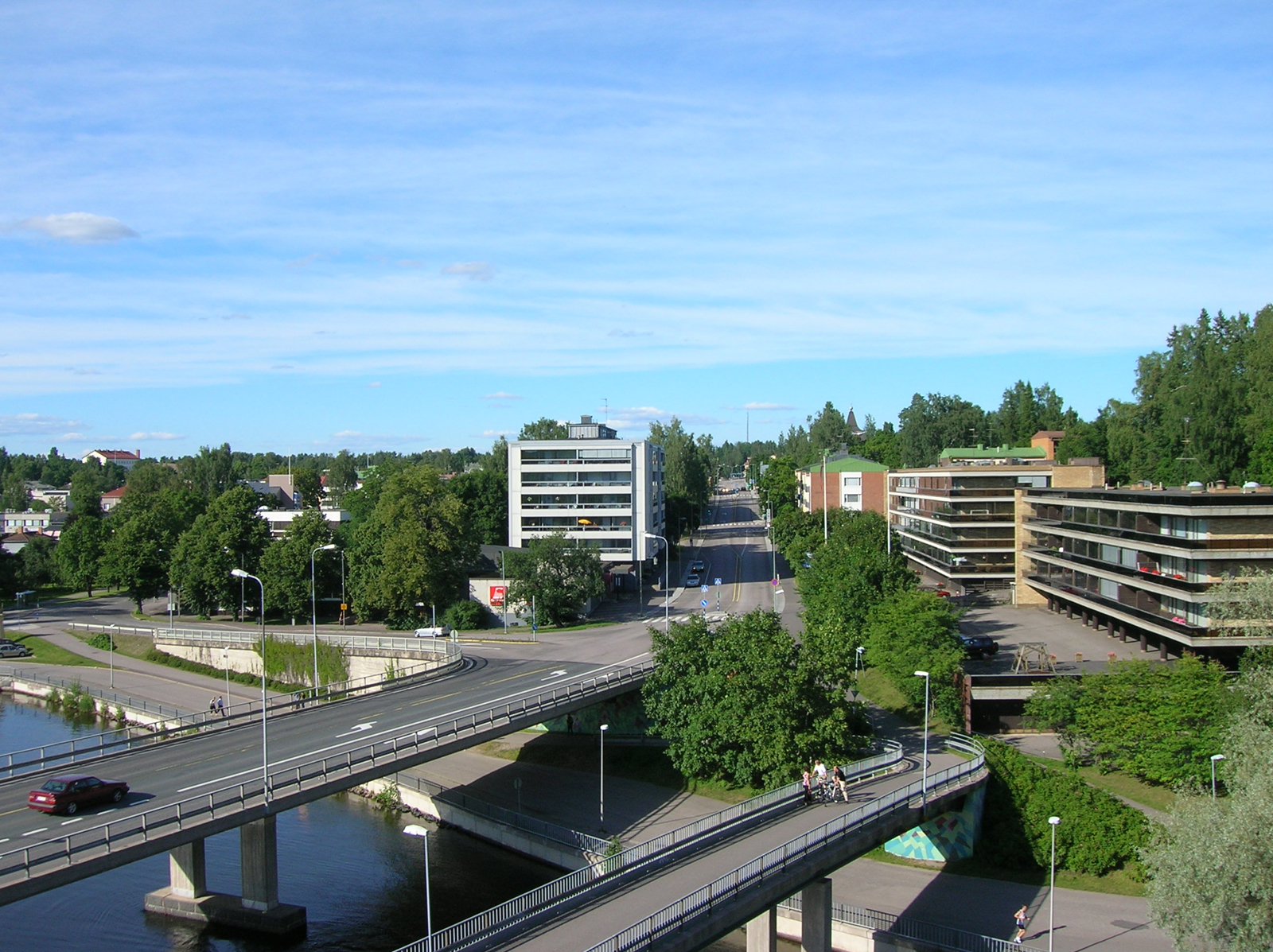
- A view from Heinola railway bridge towards the town center

- Flag Coat of arms

- Location of Heinola in Finland
- Interactive map of Heinola
- Coordinates: 61°12′N 026°02′E
- Country: Finland
- Region: Päijät-Häme
- Sub-region: Lahti (current); Heinola (former)
- Charter: 1776
- City rights: 1839

Government
  - Town manager: Jari Parkkonen

Area (2018-01-01)
  - Total: 839.28 km^{2} (324.05 sq mi)
  - Land: 675.97 km^{2} (260.99 sq mi)
  - Water: 162.96 km^{2} (62.92 sq mi)
  - Rank: 125th largest in Finland

Population (2025-12-31)
  - Total: 17,694
  - Rank: 64th largest in Finland
  - Density: 26.18/km^{2} (67.8/sq mi)

Population by native language
  - Finnish: 93.9% (official)
  - Swedish: 0.2%
  - Others: 5.8%

Population by age
  - 0 to 14: 11%
  - 15 to 64: 53.9%
  - 65 or older: 35.1%
- Time zone: UTC+02:00 (EET)
  - Summer (DST): UTC+03:00 (EEST)
- Climate: Dfc
- Website: www.heinola.fi

Heinola (Finnish pronunciation: [ˈhei̯nolɑ]) is a town and a municipality of 17,694 inhabitants (31 December 2025) located in the eastern part of the Päijät-Häme region, Finland, near the borders of the South Savo region and the Kymenlaakso region. It is the third largest municipality in the region in terms of population after Lahti and Hollola. The neighbour municipalities of Heinola are Asikkala, Hartola, Iitti, Kouvola, Mäntyharju, Nastola, Pertunmaa and Sysmä.

In the coat of arms of Heinola, the Tavastia's provincial animal, the Eurasian lynx, crosses a fess resembling an arch bridge; it refers to the Jyränkö Bridge (Jyrängönsilta) from 1932, which crosses Jyrängönvirta, the smaller part of the Kymi River. The coat of arms was designed by Gustaf von Numers and approved by the Heinola Town Council at its meeting on 23 September 1958. The coat of arms was approved for use by the Ministry of the Interior on 11 November of the same year.

In June 2024, Heinola was included in The Times newspaper's list of 30 attractive summer destinations where people can vacation without the oppressive heat.

== History ==
Heinola used to be a remote village of then larger Hollola until it gained significance in 1776 when Gustav III of Sweden promoted it to be the governmental center of the province in which it was then located. The grid plan of the city center is from that era. Heinola also became a center of commerce for nearby regions.

When Finland became a part of Russia in 1809, the capital of the province was moved eastwards with the state border. To compensate this, Heinola was granted town rights on 26 December 1839 by Czar Nicholas I. Before World War II, Heinola was widely known as a spa town, and until 1972 it served as a location for an institute (seminaari) that taught elementary school teachers. These both were established in the 1890s and played an important role in the town life.

On 29 June 1985, the jury for the 1985 International Mathematical Olympiad met in Heinola to decide the final problem list. The actual competition happened in nearby Joutsa.

Heinolan maalaiskunta was merged into Heinola in 1997.

== Geography ==
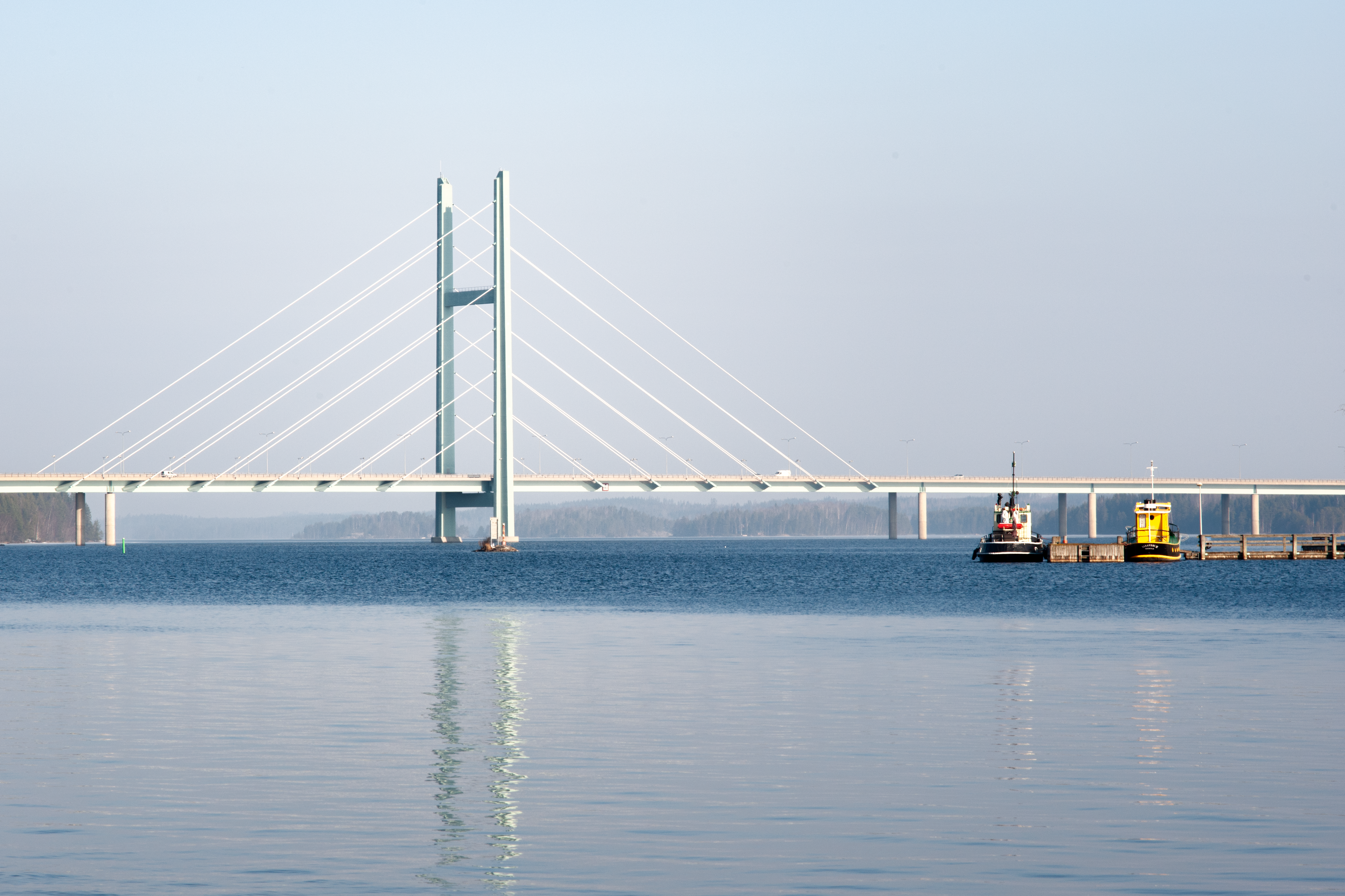
Tähtiniemi Bridge

Heinola is largely situated between two lakes, Ruotsalainen and Konnivesi. A waterway connecting the lakes crosses the town and is, along with an esker also crossing the town, a characterising geographical feature of Heinola. A motorway (Finnish national road 4/E75) connects Heinola to Lahti (distance 35 km or 22 mi) and Helsinki (distance 138 km or 86 mi); it also acrosses Lake Ruotsalainen on the Tähtiniemi Bridge in the northern part of town. Heinola is also southern head of the Finnish national road 5, which goes over 900 kilometres to the north through the cities Kuopio and Kajaani to Sodankylä.

== Climate ==
Heinola has a humid continental climate (Dfb) with four clearly defined seasons. The total amount of precipitation is highest in the summer months, and the driest is spring, especially April.

Climate data for Heinola Asemantaus (1991–2020 normals, extremes 1959- present)
Month	Jan	Feb	Mar	Apr	May	Jun	Jul	Aug	Sep	Oct	Nov	Dec	Year
Record high °C (°F)	8.1 (46.6)	9.3 (48.7)	16.0 (60.8)	23.7 (74.7)	30.8 (87.4)	32.7 (90.9)	34.9 (94.8)	33.8 (92.8)	27.5 (81.5)	19.5 (67.1)	12.9 (55.2)	11.0 (51.8)	34.9 (94.8)
Mean maximum °C (°F)	3.5 (38.3)	3.8 (38.8)	9.3 (48.7)	17.9 (64.2)	24.9 (76.8)	27.3 (81.1)	28.5 (83.3)	27.1 (80.8)	21.2 (70.2)	14.0 (57.2)	8.4 (47.1)	4.6 (40.3)	29.6 (85.3)
Mean daily maximum °C (°F)	−3.3 (26.1)	−3.0 (26.6)	1.8 (35.2)	8.6 (47.5)	16.0 (60.8)	20.2 (68.4)	22.8 (73.0)	20.8 (69.4)	14.7 (58.5)	7.5 (45.5)	2.2 (36.0)	−1.1 (30.0)	8.9 (48.0)
Daily mean °C (°F)	−5.9 (21.4)	−6.3 (20.7)	−1.8 (28.8)	3.8 (38.8)	10.4 (50.7)	15.0 (59.0)	17.8 (64.0)	15.9 (60.6)	10.7 (51.3)	4.8 (40.6)	0.3 (32.5)	−3.2 (26.2)	5.1 (41.2)
Mean daily minimum °C (°F)	−8.9 (16.0)	−9.6 (14.7)	−6.2 (20.8)	−0.7 (30.7)	4.7 (40.5)	9.8 (49.6)	12.8 (55.0)	11.5 (52.7)	7.0 (44.6)	2.2 (36.0)	−1.7 (28.9)	−5.6 (21.9)	1.3 (34.3)
Mean minimum °C (°F)	−22.7 (−8.9)	−22.7 (−8.9)	−16.7 (1.9)	−8.1 (17.4)	−2.5 (27.5)	3.6 (38.5)	7.6 (45.7)	5.5 (41.9)	0.2 (32.4)	−5.8 (21.6)	−10.7 (12.7)	−17.0 (1.4)	−26.4 (−15.5)
Record low °C (°F)	−37.5 (−35.5)	−36.6 (−33.9)	−31.4 (−24.5)	−19.0 (−2.2)	−6.2 (20.8)	−1.3 (29.7)	3.4 (38.1)	0.5 (32.9)	−6.1 (21.0)	−14.0 (6.8)	−21.2 (−6.2)	−33.5 (−28.3)	−37.5 (−35.5)
Average precipitation mm (inches)	46 (1.8)	36 (1.4)	33 (1.3)	30 (1.2)	43 (1.7)	66 (2.6)	71 (2.8)	67 (2.6)	53 (2.1)	65 (2.6)	56 (2.2)	50 (2.0)	617 (24.3)
Average precipitation days (≥ 1.0 mm)	11	10	8	7	8	10	10	10	9	11	11	12	117
Source 1: FMI climatological normals for Finland 1991-2020
Source 2: Record highs and lows 1959- present

== Economy ==
After World War II Heinola has been economically an industrial town, mainly due to its wood processing industry. Industry remained the largest source of employment until the 1970s, when the trade and services sector grew larger, following a national trend.

Volkswagen Beetles were built in Heinola.

Heinola has been hit hard by Late-2000s recession. UPM-Kymmene, that used to be the largest employer after the public sector, reported closing down its sawmill and plywood mill in Heinola during 2010.

== Sights ==
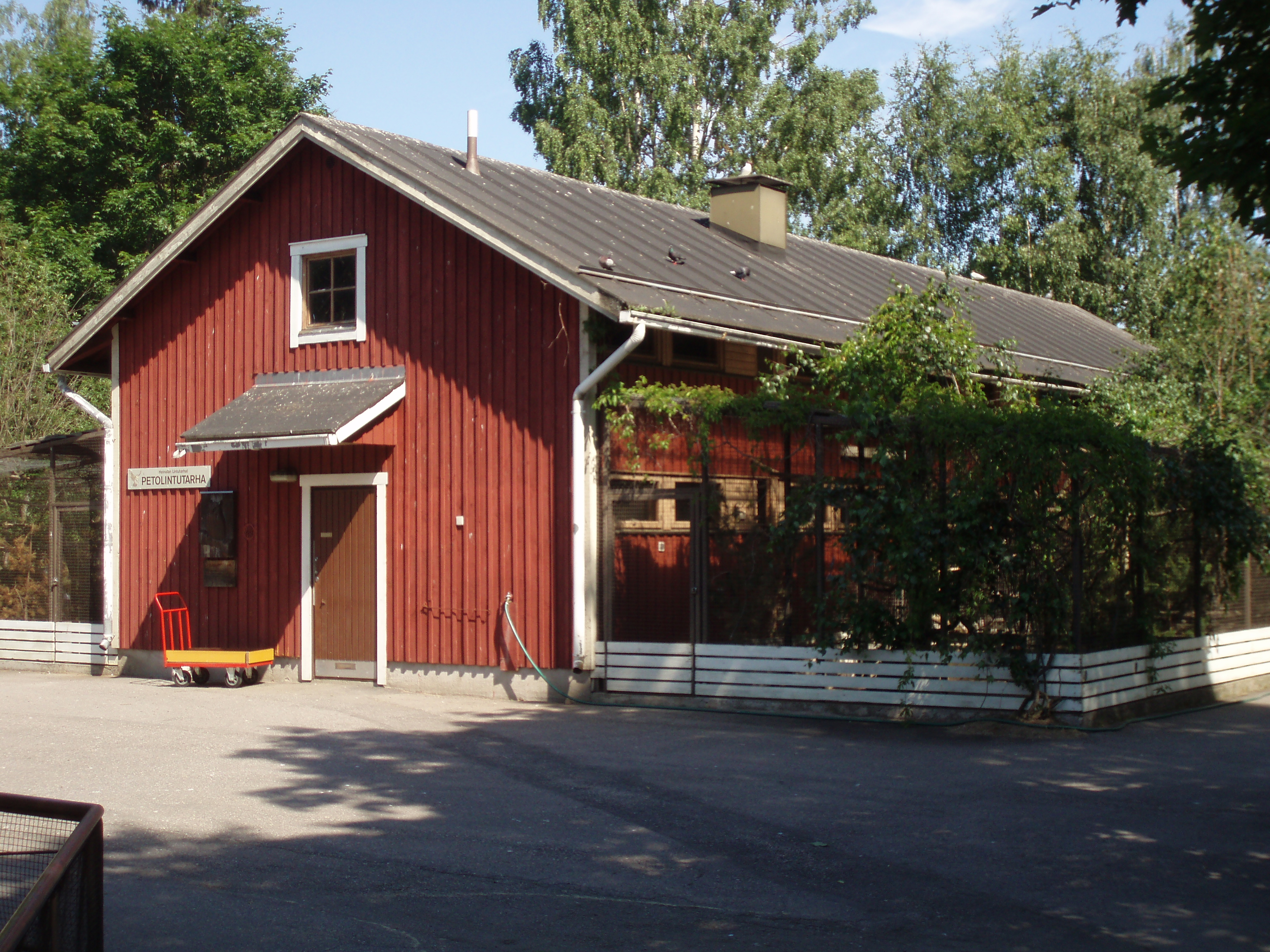
Heinola Bird Sanctuary

The bird zoo is located just next to the old bus station. The founding idea of the bird zoo is to offer help for birds that have injured themselves in the traffic, power lines and glass surfaces, and to rehabilitate them back to the nature. The birds that remain in the care, and the ones that are not capable of returning to the nature, but are considered to maintain a meaningful life in capture, are available for spectators to see. For school groups and tourists, this can be a good opportunity to identify some of the species that are not so easily spotted in the wild. In the summer, tropical birds that spend the winter inside are also to be seen.

== Culture ==
=== Food ===
In the 1980s, Heinola's traditional parish dishes were tappaiskeitto ("butchery soup") and pancakes.

== International relations ==
=== Twin towns — sister cities ===
Heinola is twinned with:

- Karlshamn, Sweden
- Peine (district), Germany
- Piešťany, Slovakia

== See also ==
- Heinolan Peliitat
- Lusi (Heinola)
- Vierumäki
