= Matti Niemi =

Matti Niemi may refer to:

- Matti Niemi (hurdler) (born 1976), Finnish hurdler
- Matti Niemi (rowing) (born 1937), Finnish coxswain
