= Niko Nieminen =

Finnish ice hockey player

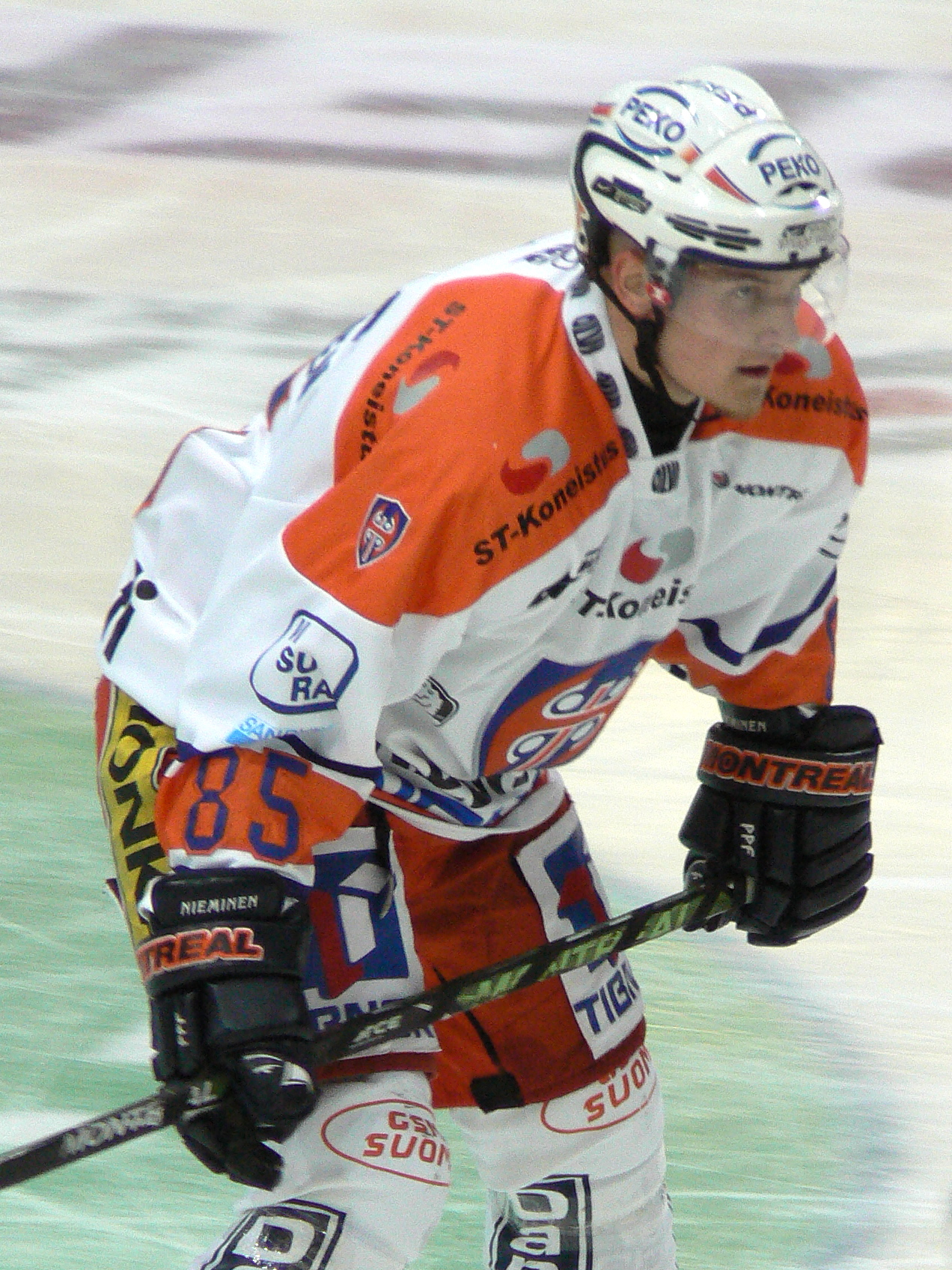
- Born: 16 June 1982 (age 42); Espoo, Finland
- Height: 6 ft 0 in (183 cm)
- Weight: 187 lb (85 kg; 13 st 5 lb)
- Position: Forward
- Shot: Right
- Played for: Espoo Blues; Tappara; HPK
- NHL draft: Undrafted
- Playing career: 2000–2013

Niko Nieminen (born 16 June 1982) is a Finnish former professional ice hockey forward who played in the SM-liiga for the Espoo Blues, Tappara, and HPK.
