= Jarkko Niemi =

Jarkko Niemi may refer to:

- Jarkko Niemi (actor) (born 1984), Finnish actor
- Jarkko Niemi (cyclist) (born 1982), Finnish cyclist
- Jarkko Niemi (musician), Finnish bassist and member of Brymir
