= Antti Niemi =

Antti Niemi may refer to:

- Antti Niemi (footballer) (born 1972), Finnish football goalkeeper
- Antti Niemi (ice hockey) (born 1983), Finnish ice hockey goaltender
- Antti-Jussi Niemi (born 1977), Finnish ice hockey defenceman
