= Toni Niemi =

Finnish ice hockey player

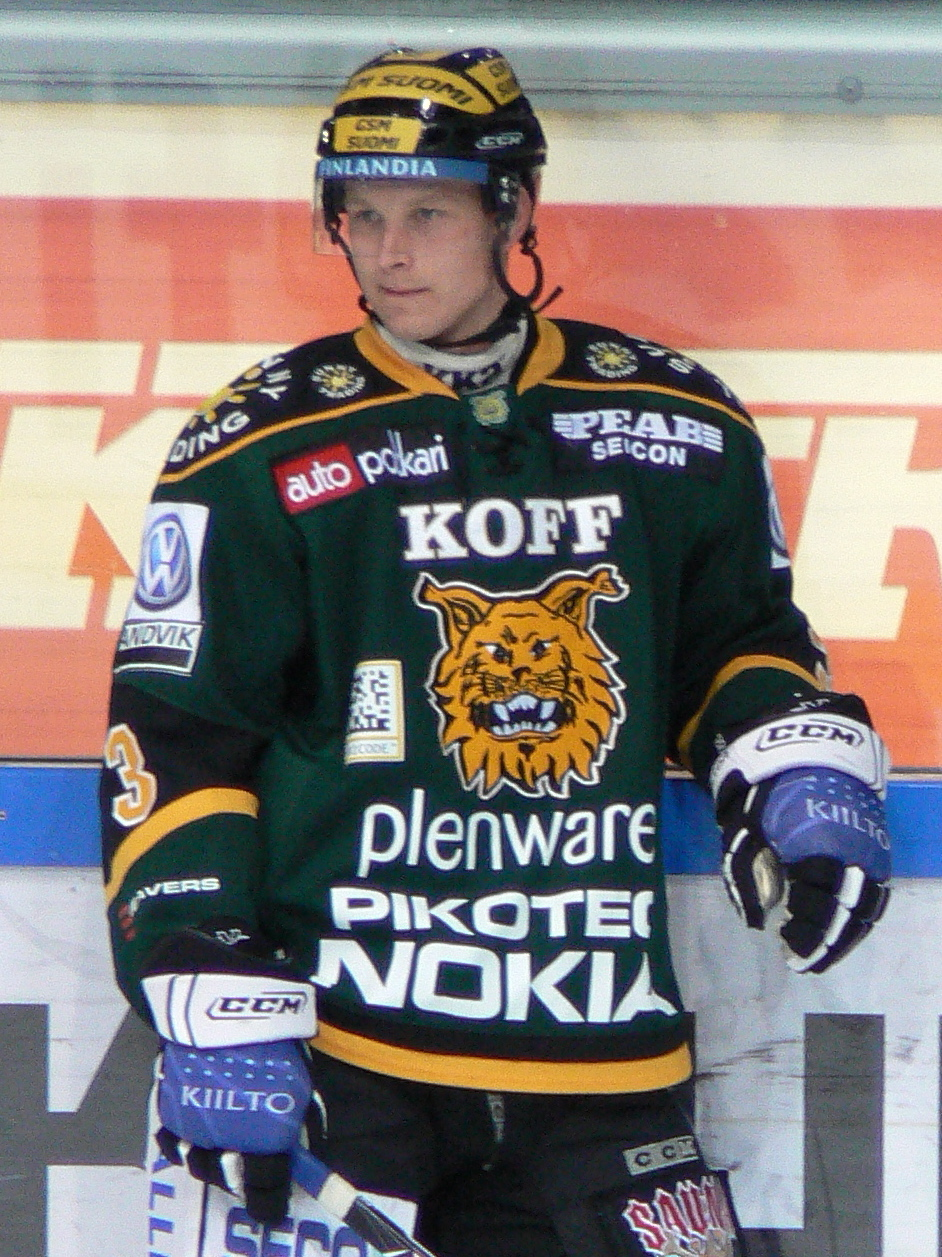
- Born: March 14, 1985 (age 40); Pirkkala, Finland
- Height: 6 ft 2 in (188 cm)
- Weight: 187 lb (85 kg; 13 st 5 lb)
- Position: Defence
- Shoots: Left
- SM-liiga team: Ilves
- NHL draft: Undrafted
- Playing career: 2004–present

Toni Niemi (born March 14, 1985) is a Finnish ice hockey defenceman.

Niemi made his SM-liiga debut playing with Ilves during the 2004–05 SM-liiga season.
