= Pekka Niemi =

Pekka Niemi may refer to:

- Pekka Niemi (skier) (1909–1993), Finnish cross-country skier
- Pekka Niemi (weightlifter) (born 1952), Finnish weightlifter
- Pekka Niemi (skijoring), Finnish gold medalist at the 2022 IFSS On-Snow World Championships
