= Heinolan maalaiskunta =

Coordinates: 61°15′N 26°04′E

Heinolan maalaiskunta Heinola landskommun
- Former municipality
- Heinolan maalaiskunta Heinola landskommun
- Coat of arms

- Country: Finland
- Region: Päijät-Häme
- Charter: 1848
- Consolidated: 1997

Population (1992)
  - Total: 6,070
- Time zone: UTC+2 (EET)
  - Summer (DST): UTC+3 (EEST)

Heinolan maalaiskunta (Swedish: Heinola landskommun; literally "Heinola Rural Municipality") is a former municipality in Päijät-Häme, Finland. It was established in 1848. It surrounded Heinola town and was united to Heinola in 1997. Most of its surface area was forest. Population was about 8000 before uniting to Heinola.

Coat of arms was figuring sleigh parts. Theme was inspired in 1934, describing maybe the world's oldest part that included to sleigh. Part was founded from Tuusjärvi village and is now held in National Museum of Finland, Helsinki.

== See also ==
- Vierumäki
