= Päijät-Häme =

Region of Finland

Coordinates: 61°15′N 25°50′E

Päijät-Häme Päijänne-Tavastland
- Region
- Region of Päijät-Häme; Päijät-Hämeen maakunta (Finnish); Landskapet Päijänne-Tavastland (Swedish)
- Flag Coat of arms

- Päijät-Häme on a map of Finland
- Country: Finland
- Historical province: Tavastia
- Capital: Lahti
- Other towns: Heinola and Orimattila

Government
  - Regional Mayor: Ulla-Kirsikka Vainio

Area
  - Total: 6,256.66 km^{2} (2,415.71 sq mi)
  - Land: 5,126.11 km^{2} (1,979.20 sq mi)

Population (2019)
  - Total: 199,604
  - Density: 38.9387/km^{2} (100.851/sq mi)

GDP
  - Total: €6.247 billion (2015)
  - Per capita: €30,955 (2015)
- ISO 3166 code: FI-16
- NUTS: 185
- Regional bird: White-backed woodpecker (Dendrocopos leucotos)
- Regional fish: Carp bream (Abramis brama)
- Regional flower: Cornflower (Centaurea cyanus)
- Regional stone: Diabase
- Regional lake: Lake Päijänne
- Regional song: Vihreiden harjujen maa (The Land of the Green Ridges)
- Website: paijat-hame.fi

Päijät-Häme (Finnish pronunciation: [ˈpæi̯j(ː)æt̪ˌhæme̞(ʔ)]; Swedish: Päijänne-Tavastland) is a region in Southern Finland south of the lake Päijänne. It borders the regions of Uusimaa, Kanta-Häme, Pirkanmaa, Central Finland, South Savo and Kymenlaakso. The biggest city in the region is Lahti.

Päijät-Häme boasts a landscape shaped by two key features. Finland's second-largest, Lake Päijänne, dominates the region, offering a vast freshwater expanse and a vital transportation route. The Salpausselkä ridge, a glacial remnant, adds a touch of elevation and scenic variation. Beyond these, Päijät-Häme features extensive coniferous forests. Rolling hills provide scenic views, while numerous smaller lakes and rivers create a network of waterways.

== History ==
Päijät-Häme's landscape reflects the dramatic retreat of glaciers. The last Ice Age carved the land, leaving ridges (Salpausselkä) and large lakes (Finnish Lakeland). As the ice melted, the Baltic Sea went through various stages, dramatically changing shorelines. Land rose, creating islands and eventually dry land. Human settlement followed the receding water, with the Porvoo River valley being the oldest cultural landscape. Today, Päijät-Häme boasts a unique blend of lakes, ridges, and reminders of its glacial past.

After glaciers retreated 11,000 years ago, the first settlers arrived in Päijät-Häme. Birch dominated the initially barren landscape. As the climate warmed, people lived near ancient lakes and bays. By 5100 BC, the Comb Ceramic culture thrived. The arrival of the Battle Axe culture around 3200 BC brought new tools and pottery styles. During the Bronze Age (1900 BC), cremation burials and large stone cairns became common. In the Iron Age, settlements shifted to better farming areas near waterways. Viking raids and unrest marked the later Iron Age. Christianity arrived during the Crusades (1050-1300 AD).

By the Middle Ages, villages dotted the shores of waterways and lakes. The 16th century saw a solidification of village life, with the most prominent settlements around Hollola, Lahti, and Nastola. The 1800s brought a boom in agriculture, with cultivated land tripling and industries like flax farming and cattle raising flourishing. Forests were mostly owned by farms, and improved transportation facilitated timber sales. Manor houses played a crucial role in rural life until World War I, with some later being divided into new farms. Today, Päijät-Häme's settlement can be divided into three zones: the sparsely populated eastern area with smaller farms and estates, the more densely populated central region with a strong presence of independent farms, and the sparsely populated north with vast forests. As transportation networks evolved, settlement patterns shifted, with Lahti emerging as the dominant population center.

Villages in Päijät-Häme have a long history intertwined with the landscape. Most likely arose around the 16th century, strategically placed near ridges and waterways for easy access to water and fertile land. Water remained the primary mode of transportation for centuries, with some villages even shifting their centers to be closer to navigable routes. The arrival of railways in the 19th century revolutionized transportation, and later road networks further influenced development. Heinola, for example, benefitted from its location near the Kymijoki River, which facilitated industrial growth once railways arrived. This pattern likely mirrored itself across Päijät-Häme during the 1800s and 1900s.

Heinola, founded in 1776, became the region's first city in 1839. Industrial areas grew around its center, particularly on the east and south sides. Lahti's story is tied to railways and lakeside industry. It gained market town rights in 1878 and city status in 1905. Factories like sawmills, a pulp mill, and match factories fueled Lahti's expansion. Village churches (kirkonkylät) also saw growth from the 1860s onward, spurred by relaxed land ownership laws. However, rapid expansion in some villages obscured their older features. Lahti housed sawmills, pulp mills, glass factories, and textile producers. Heinola developed sawmills, plywood, and fiberboard factories alongside metalworking. Notably, Hämeenkoski had Finland's first flax cleaning plant built in 1888. Worker housing districts accompanied industrial growth. The passage mentions both early examples and later, larger developments from the post-war period and the 1960s and 70s.

== Heraldry ==
Blazon: Azure, a mermaid and in dexter chief a cuckoo close Or. In laymen's terms: The coat of arms sports a depiction of the ancient water goddess Vellamo as a mermaid, with a cuckoo.

== Municipalities ==
The region of Päijät-Häme consists of 10 municipalities, two of which have city status (marked in bold). All of the municipalities belong to the Lahti sub-region. Previously, Heinola, Sysmä and Hartola formed the Heinola sub-region (known as Itä-Häme sub-region until 2001), which merged with the Lahti sub-region in 2010.

=== Municipalities on the map ===
Cities and municipalities of Päijät-Häme.

=== Sub-regions ===
Lahti sub-region

- Asikkala
- Hartola (Gustav Adolfs)
- **Heinola**
- Hollola
- Iitti (Itis)
- Kärkölä
- **Lahti** (Lahtis)
- **Orimattila**
- Padasjoki
- Sysmä

=== Municipalities listed ===
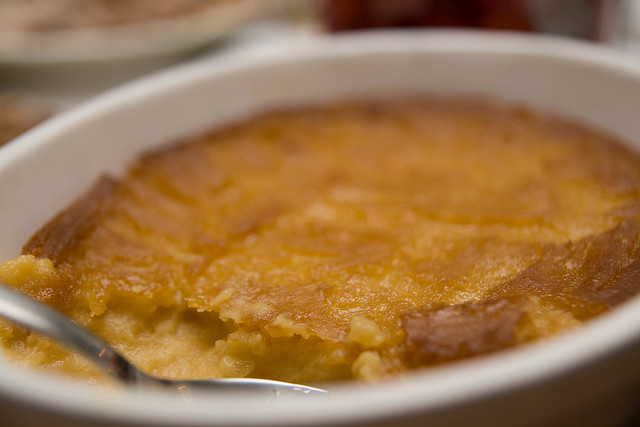
Imelletty perunalaatikko

Coat of arms	Municipality	Population	Land area (km^{2})	Density (/km^{2})	Finnish speakers	Swedish speakers	Other speakers
Coat of arms of Asikkala	Asikkala	7,841	563	14	96 %	0.1 %	4 %
Coat of arms of Hartola	Hartola	2,401	543	4	96 %	0 %	4 %
Coat of arms of Heinola	Heinola	17,694	676	26	94 %	0.2 %	6 %
Coat of arms of Hollola	Hollola	22,775	651	35	96 %	0.4 %	4 %
Coat of arms of Iitti	Iitti	6,329	590	11	97 %	0.2 %	3 %
Coat of arms of Kärkölä	Kärkölä	4,052	257	16	93 %	0.5 %	6 %
Coat of arms of Lahti	Lahti	121,832	460	265	88 %	0.5 %	11 %
Coat of arms of Orimattila	Orimattila	15,575	785	20	94 %	0.6 %	5 %
Coat of arms of Padasjoki	Padasjoki	2,656	523	5	96 %	0 %	3 %
Coat of arms of Sysmä	Sysmä	3,367	667	5	96 %	0.3 %	4 %
	Total	204,522	5,715	36	91 %	0.4 %	8 %

=== Former municipalities ===
A map of Päijät-Häme in 1996.

- Artjärvi (Artsjö)
  - Consolidated with the town of Orimattila in 2011.
- Hämeenkoski
  - Consolidated with the municipality of Hollola in 2016.
- Heinolan maalaiskunta (Heinola landskommun)
  - Consolidated with the town of Heinola in 1997.
- Nastola
  - Consolidated with the city of Lahti in 2016.
- Until 2021, Iitti was part of the Kymenlaakso region before it became part of Päijät-Häme.

== Demographics ==
Population size 1990–2025
Year	Population
1990	204,901
1995	205,973
2000	204,912
2005	206,240
2010	208,777
2015	208,525
2020	205,771
2025	204,522

== Politics ==
For parliamentary elections, Päijät-Häme, together with the region of Kanta-Häme, is part of the Häme constituency. As of 2023, the constituency elects 14 of the 200 members of the Parliament of Finland.

== See also ==
- Kajaanselkä Basin
- Kymi River
- Lake Vesijärvi

== Gallery ==
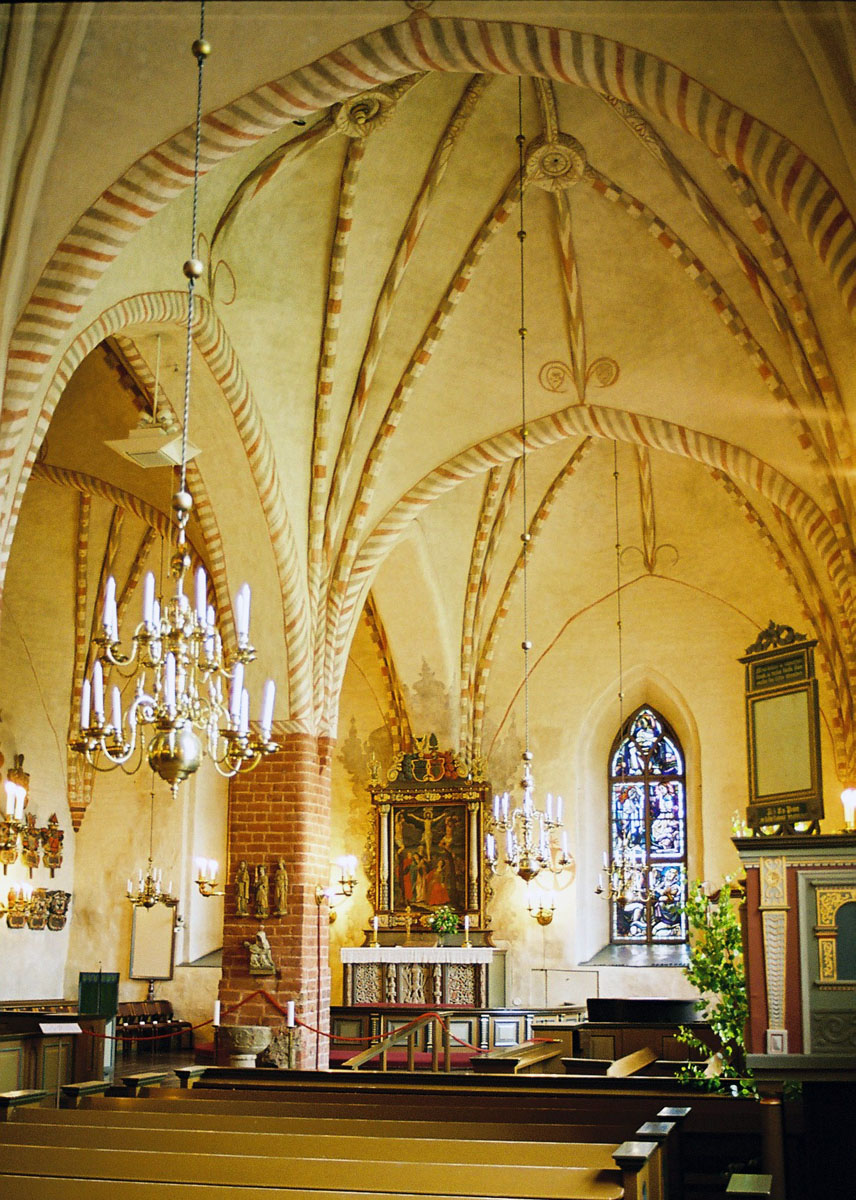
Medieval church in Hollola

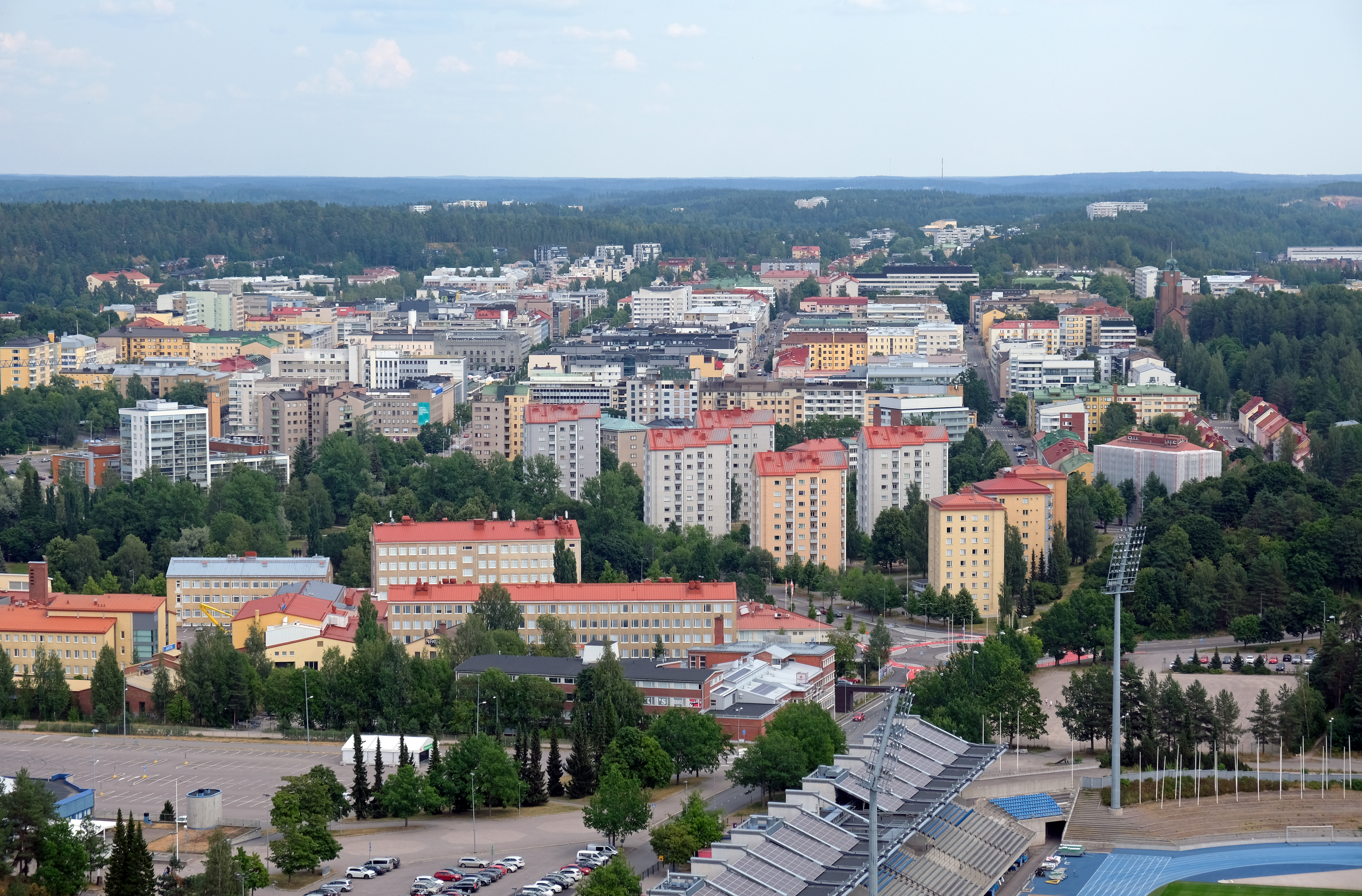
A view of Lahti centre

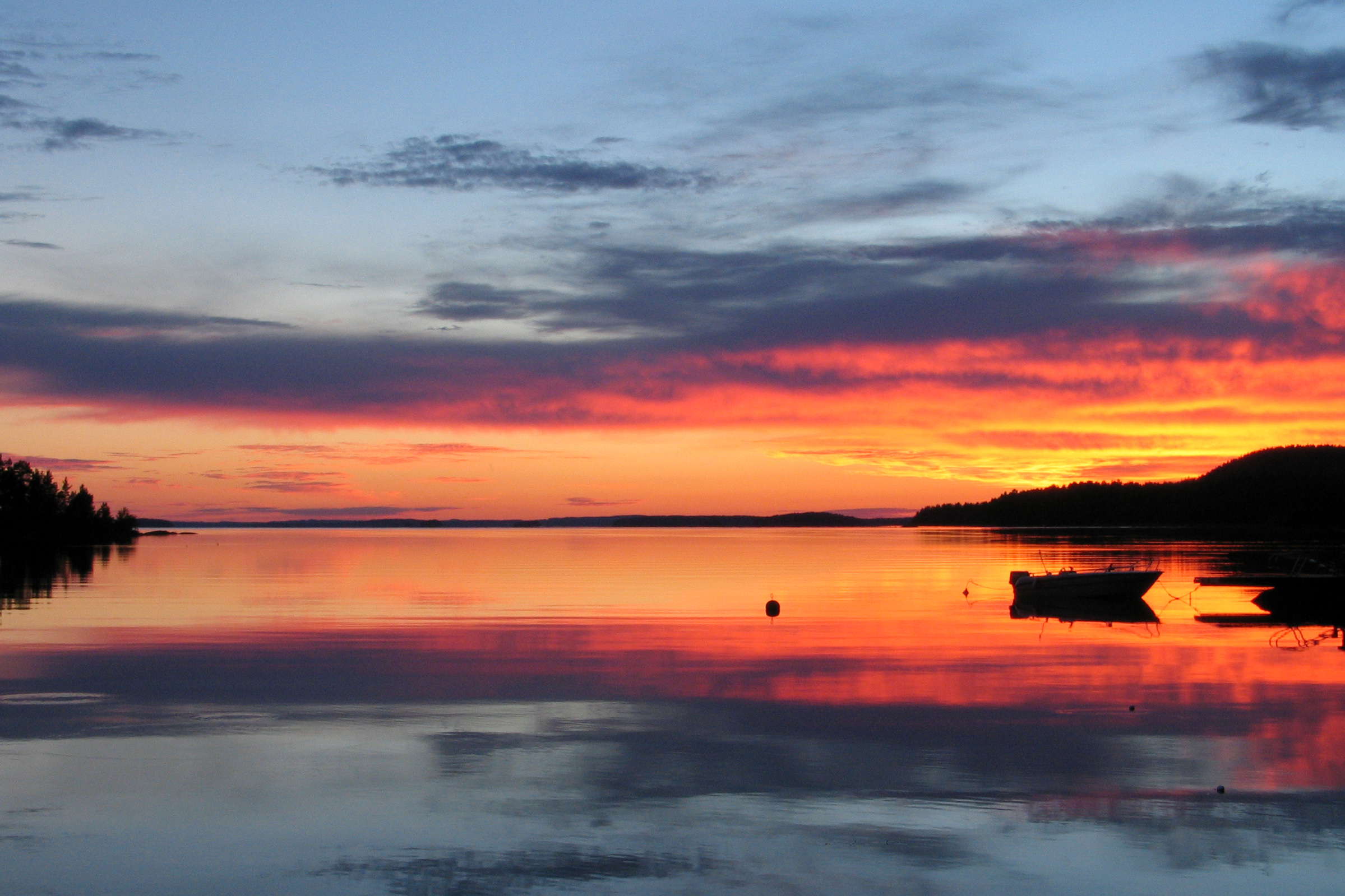
Lake Päijänne in Sysmä

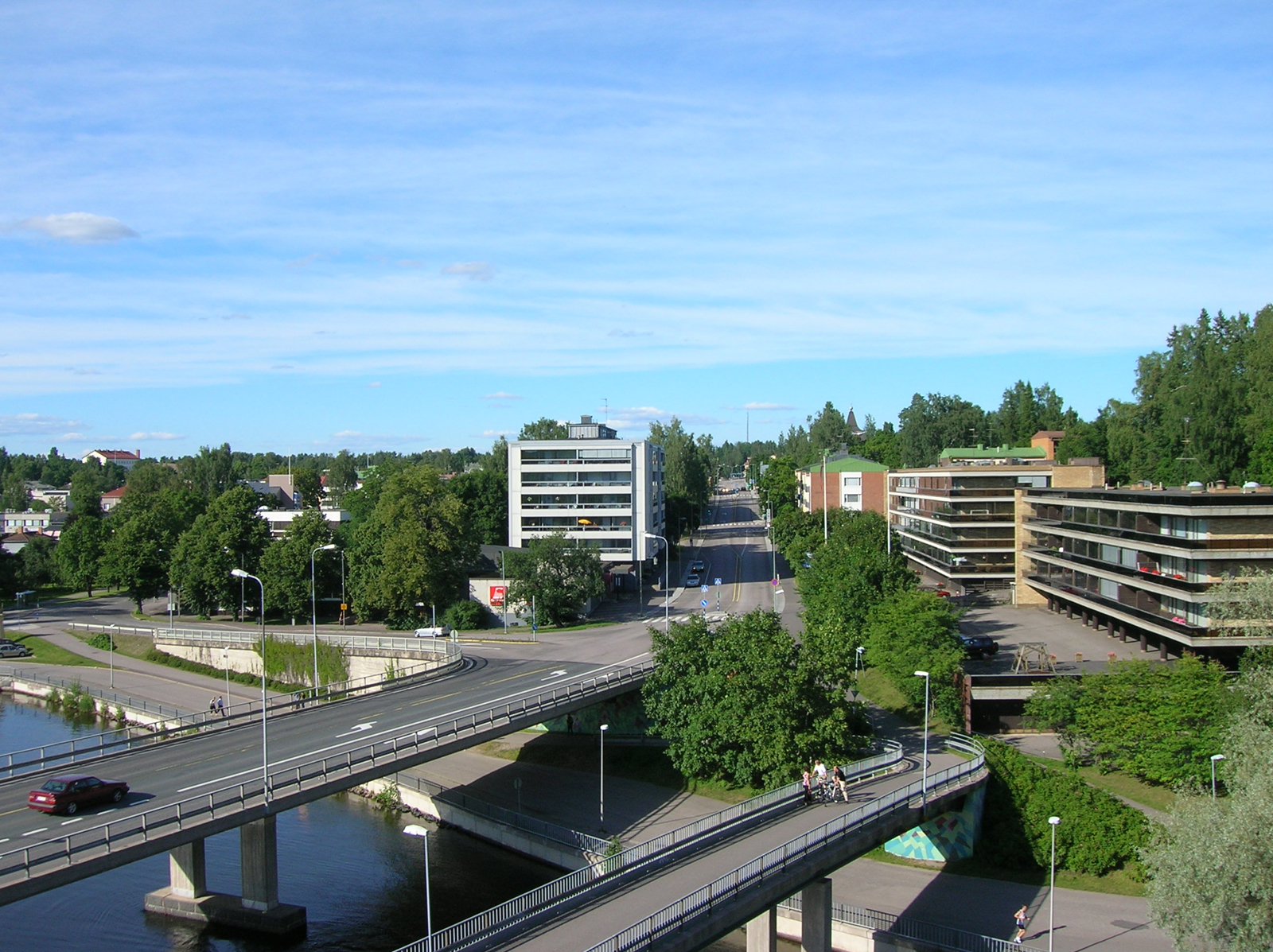
Heinola town centre

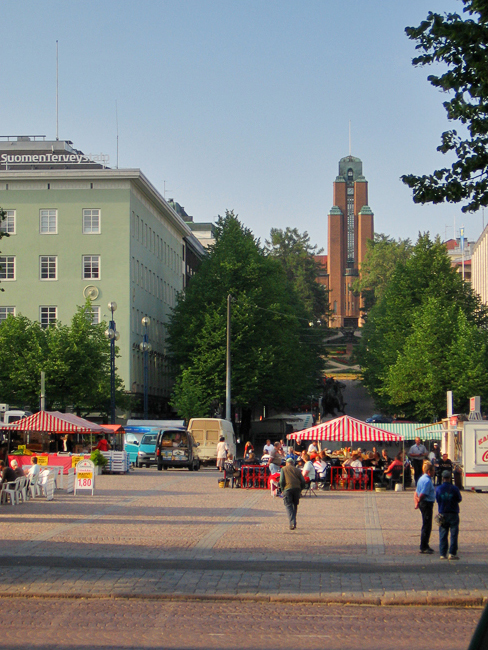
Lahti Market Place with the City Hall by Eliel Saarinen in the background

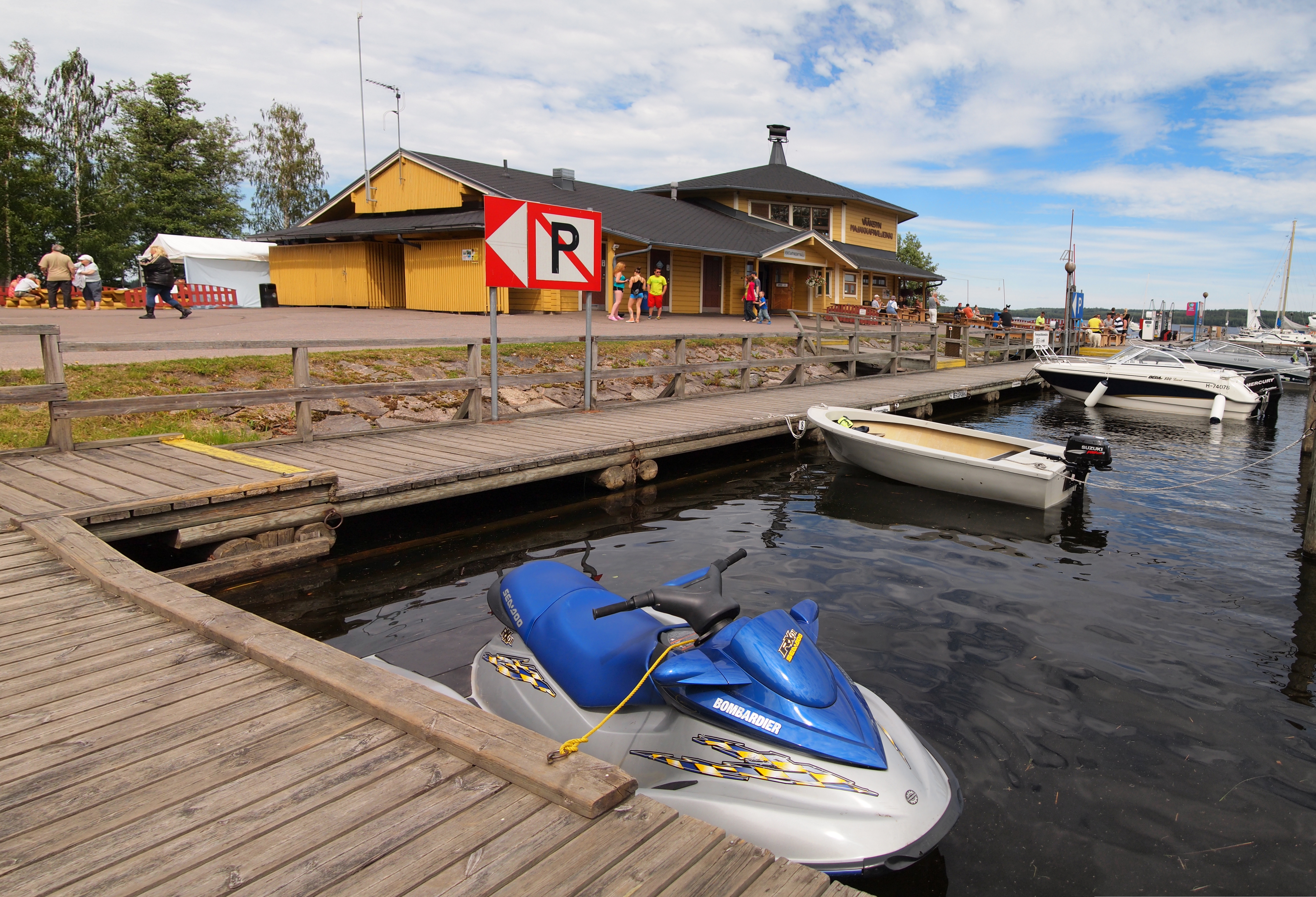
Harbour in Vääksy, Asikkala

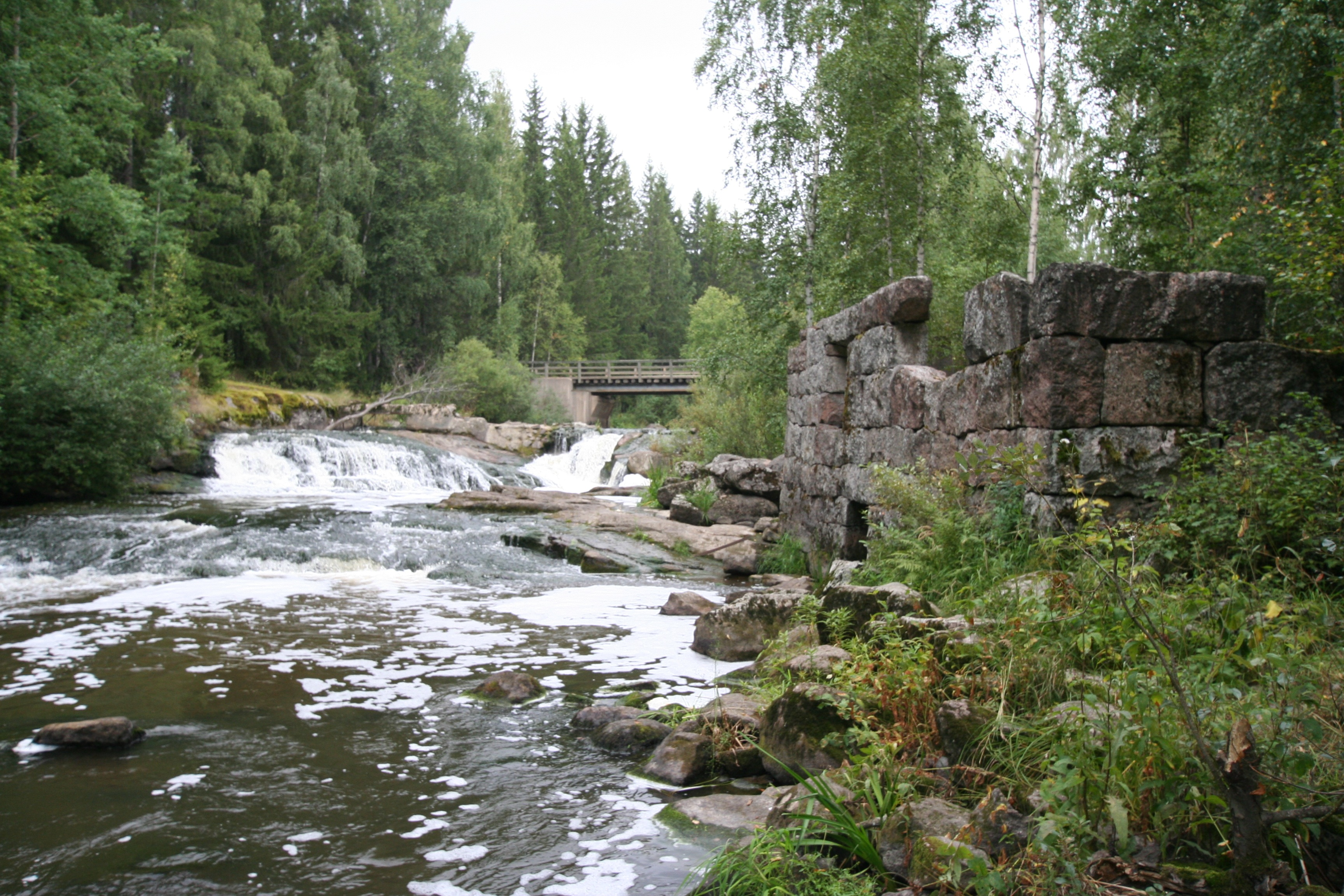
Virenoja Rapids and ruins of an old mill, Orimattila

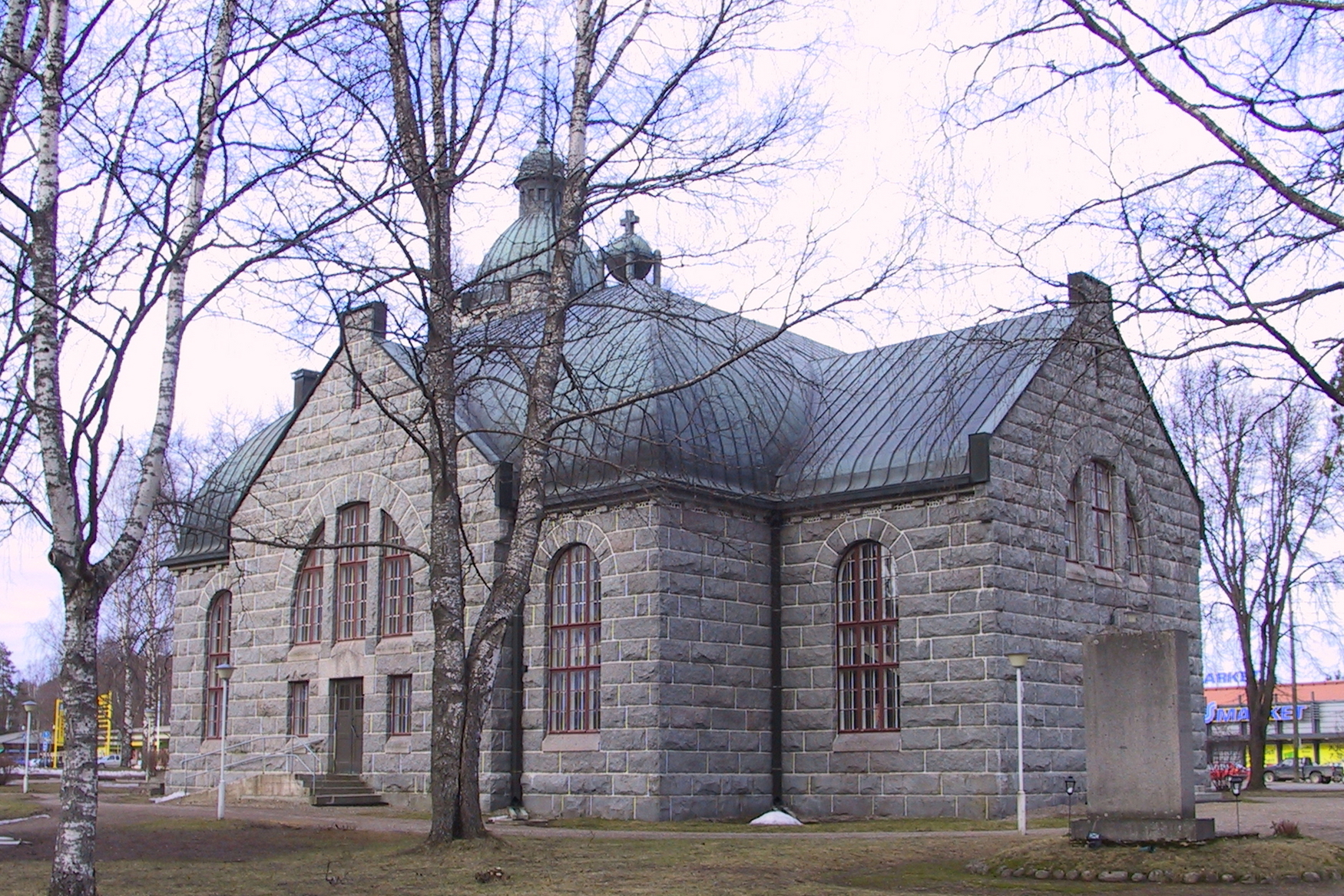
Hartola Church

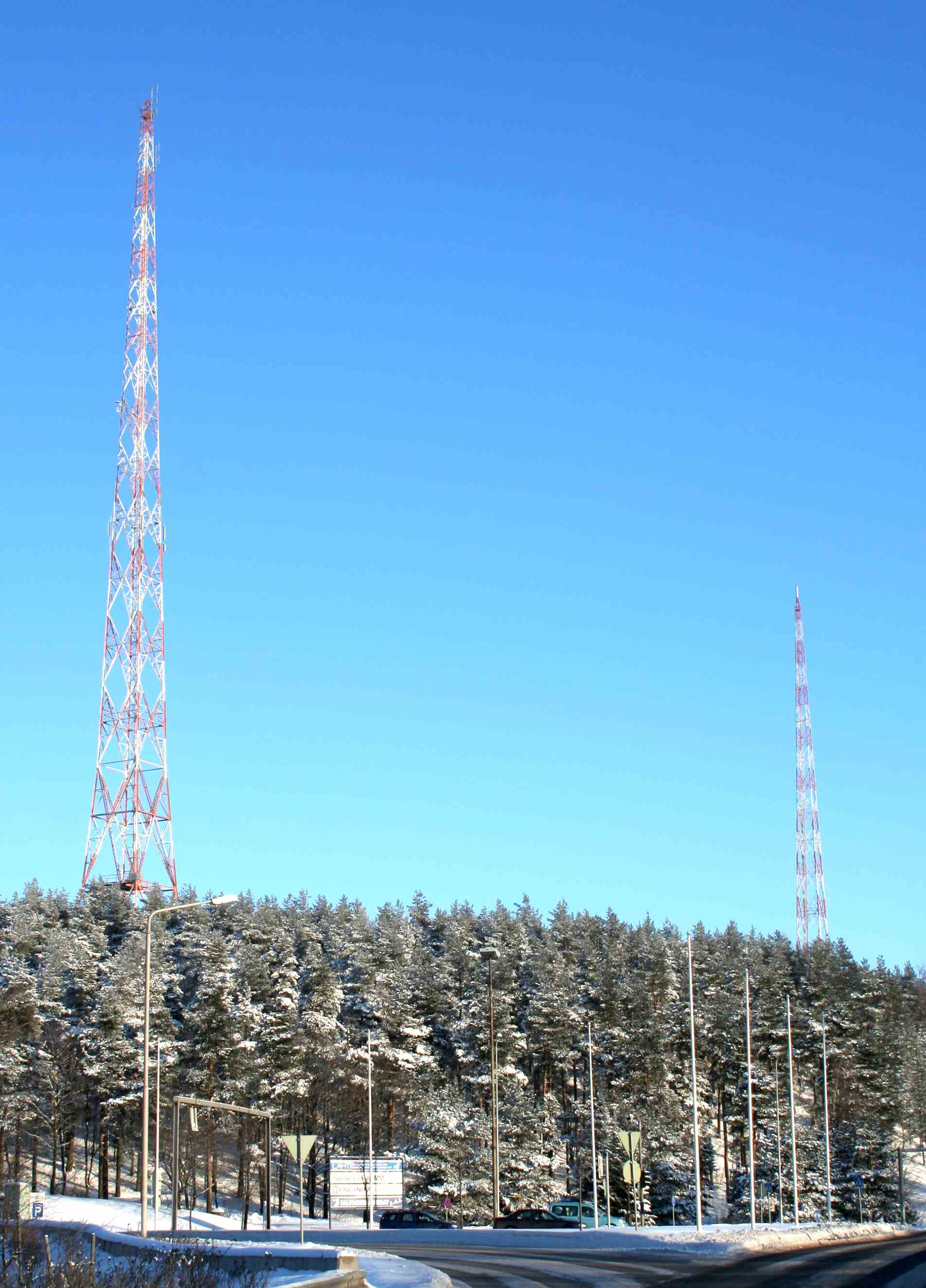
The radio masts in Lahti, symbols for the city

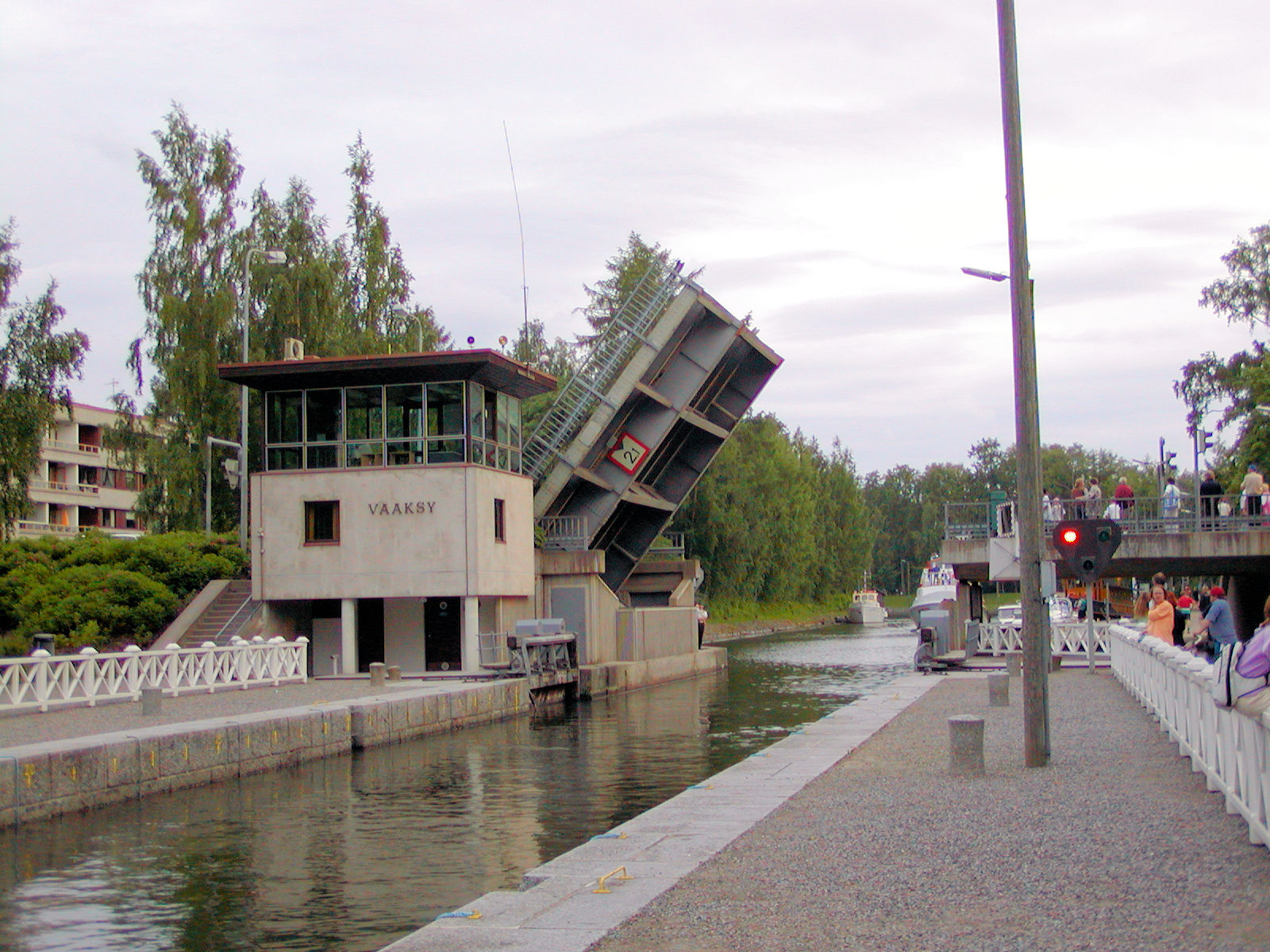
Vääksy Canal, Asikkala

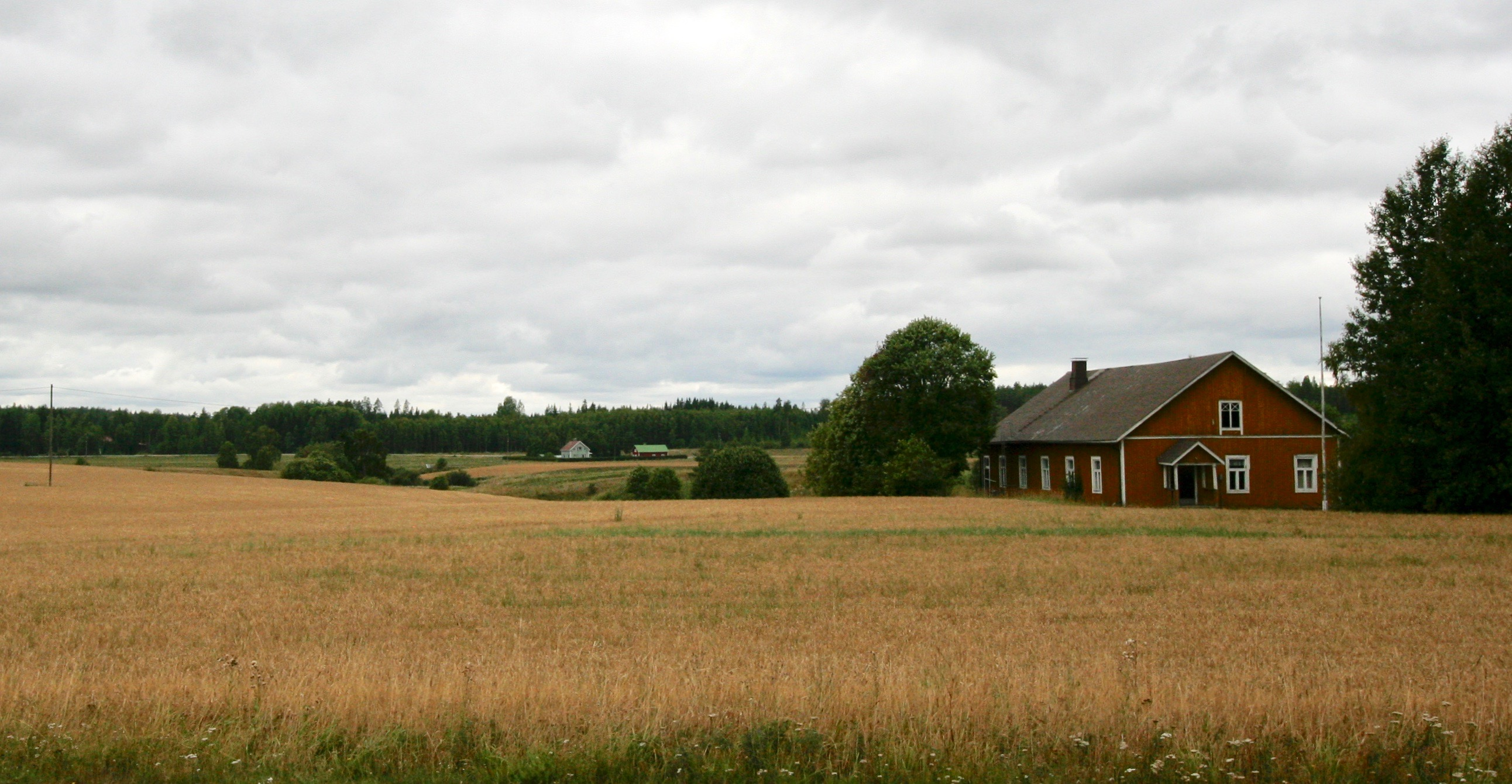
Rural landscape in Orimattila

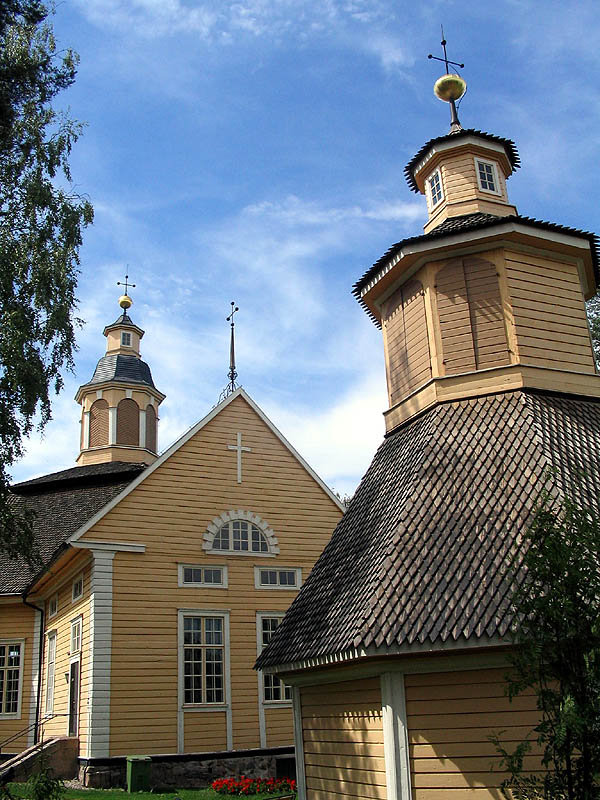
Nastola Church

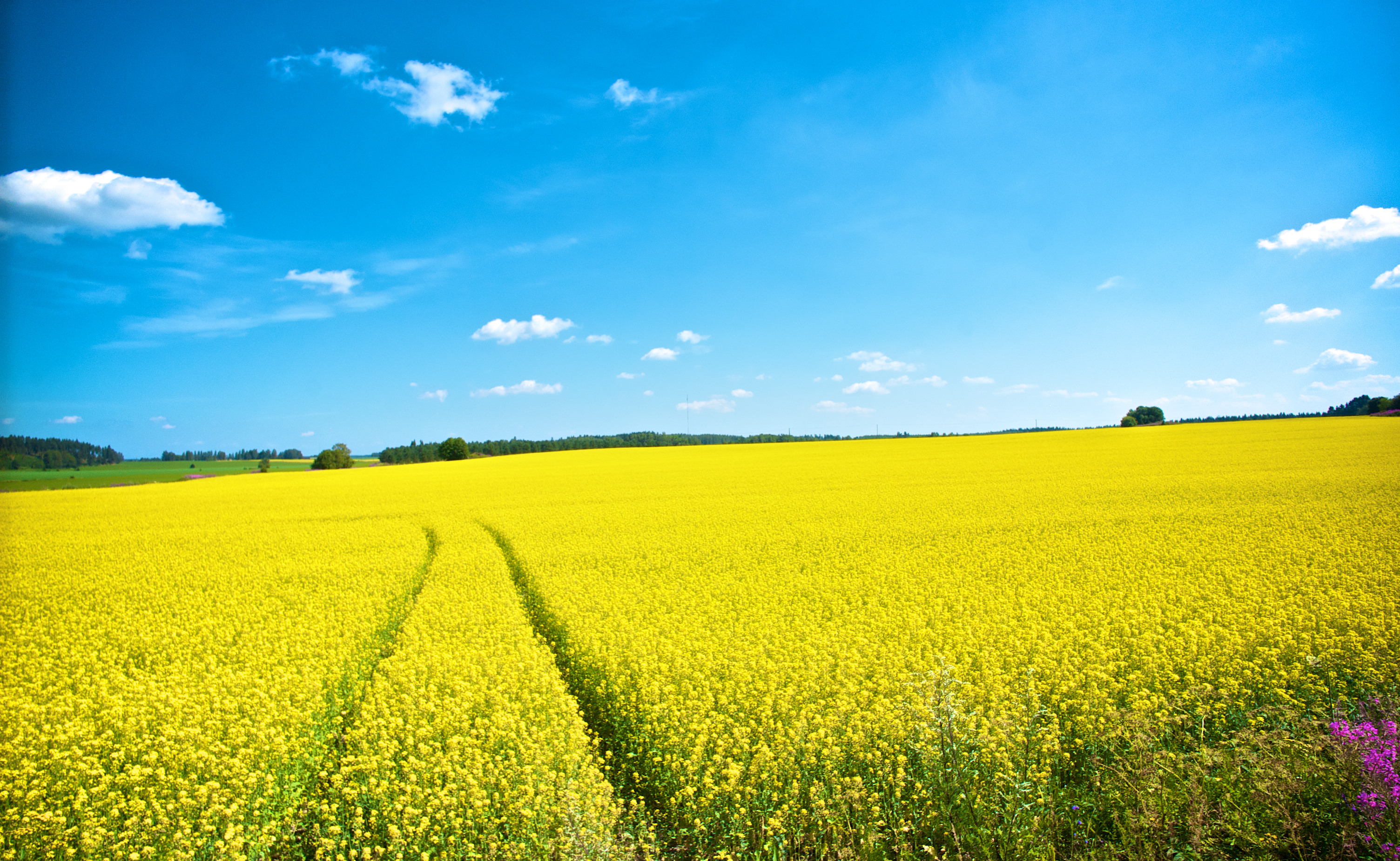
Rural landscape in Kärkölä

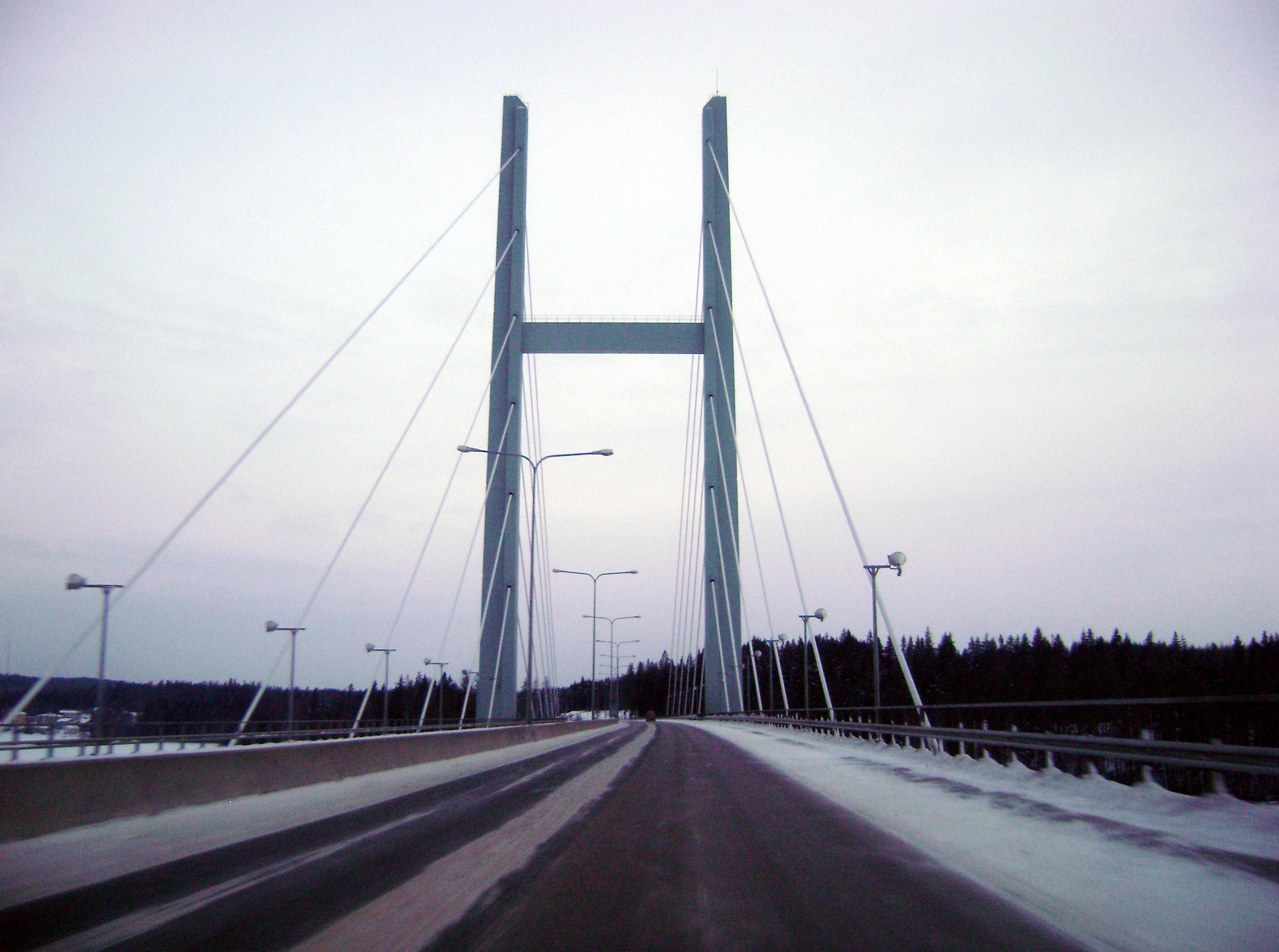
The Tähtiniemi Bridge in Heinola

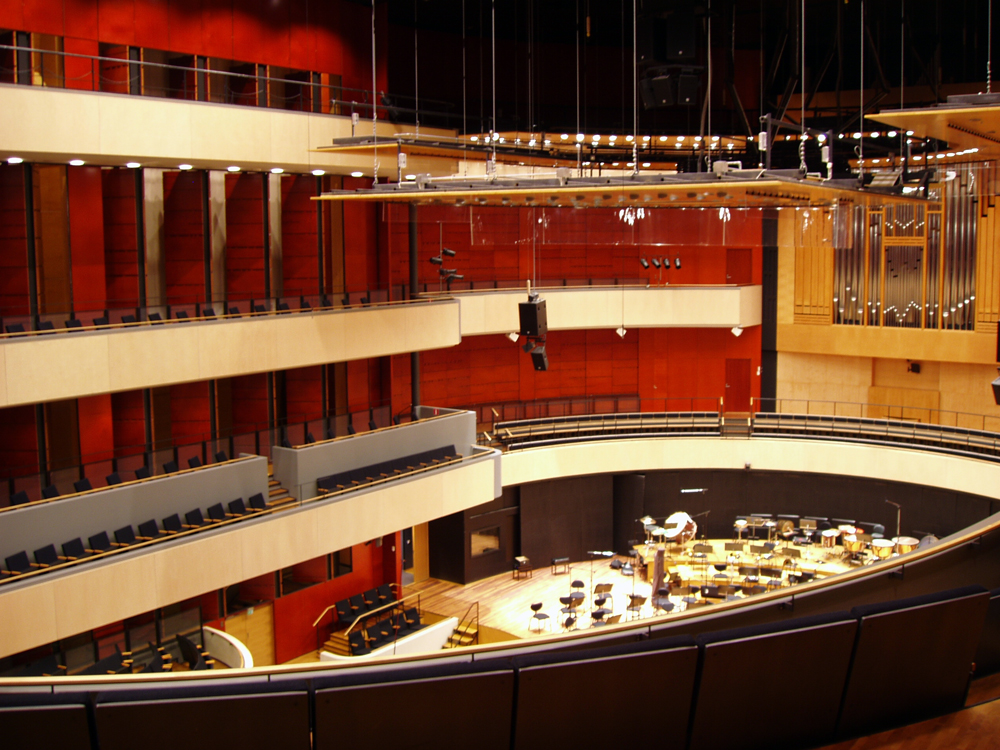
The celebrated Sibelius Hall is the heart of Lahti's cultural life

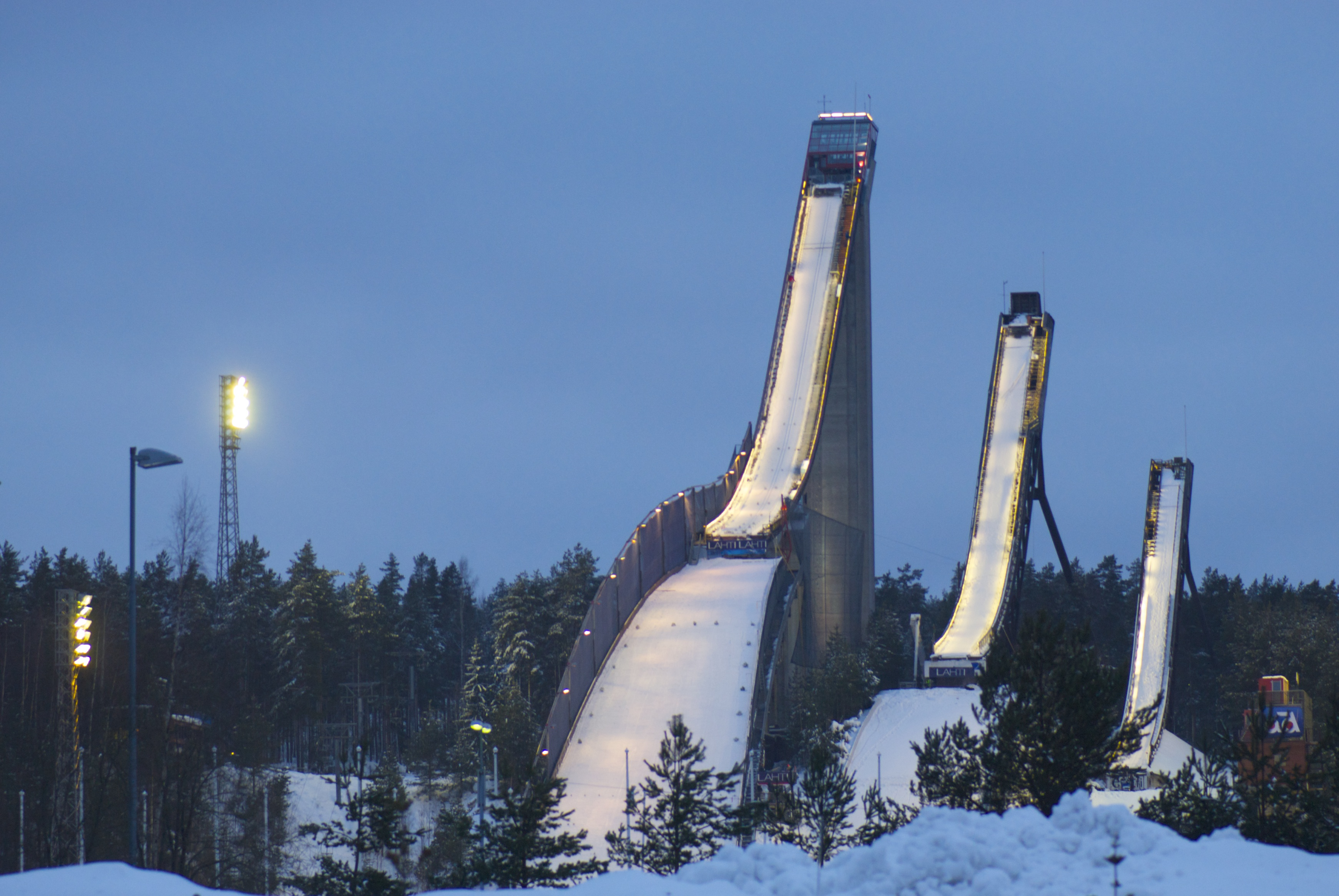
Ski jumping hills in Lahti; also a venue for Ski Jumping WC

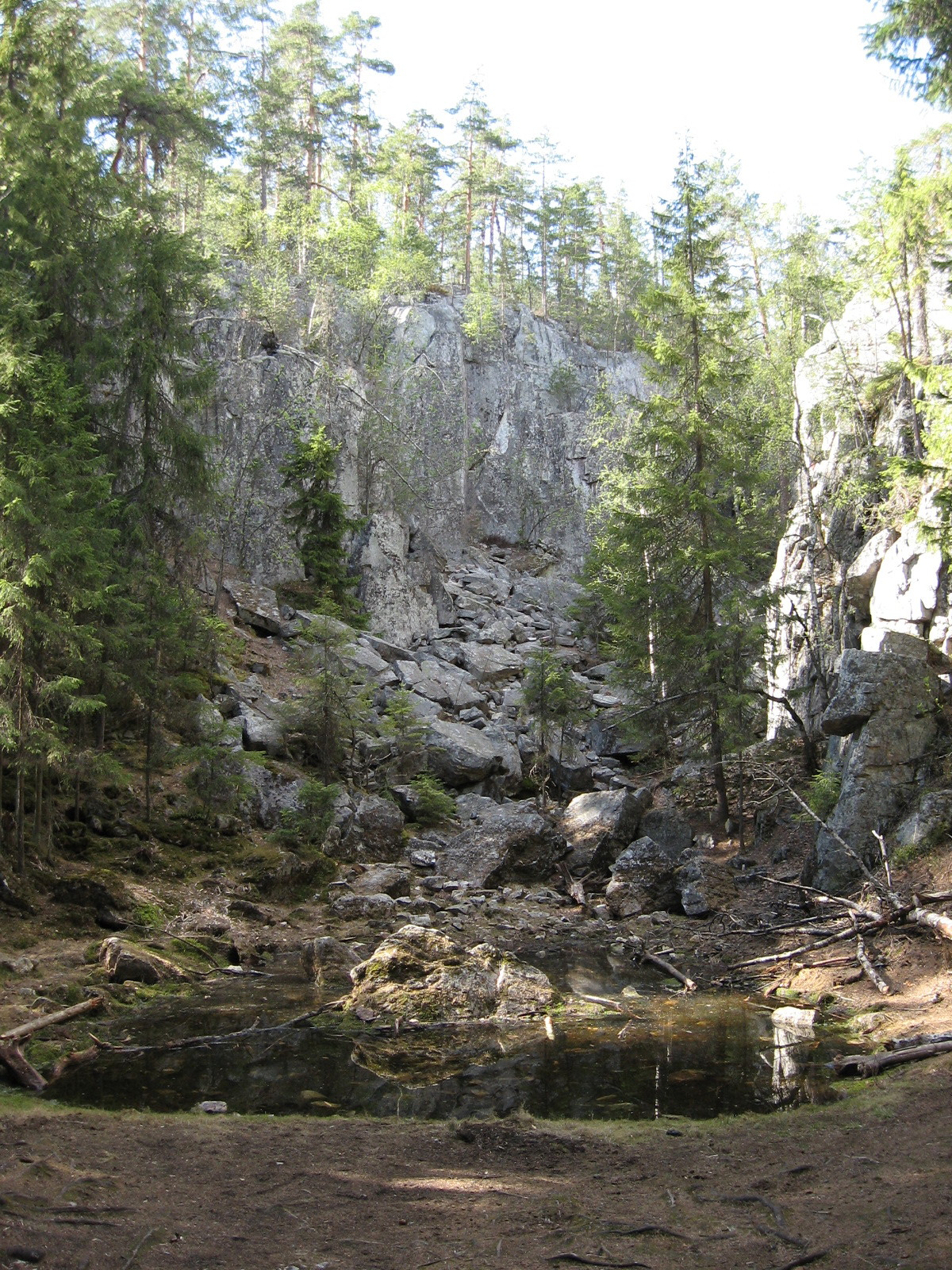
A rock cleft in Hollola

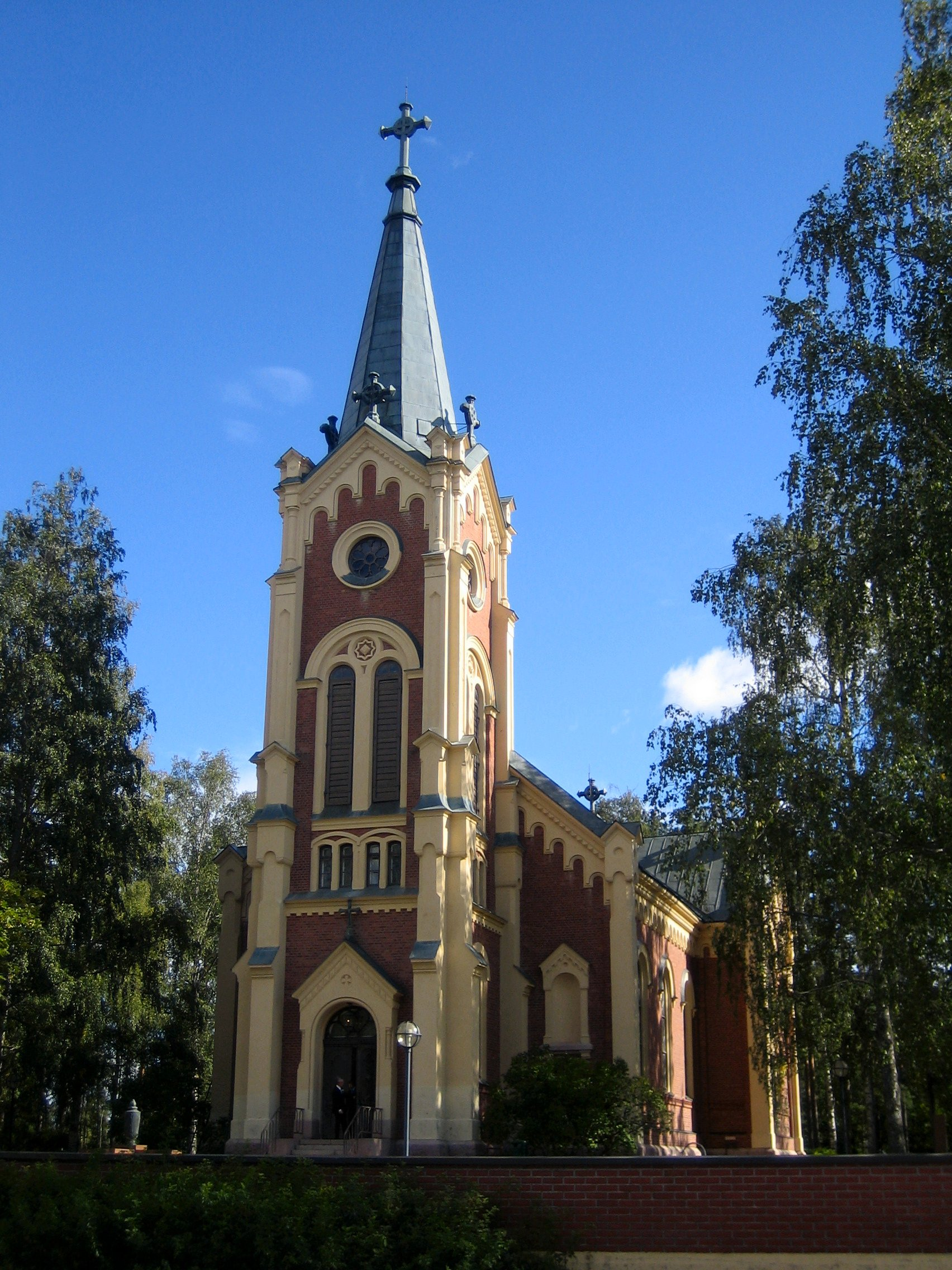
The Gothic Revival church in Kärkölä

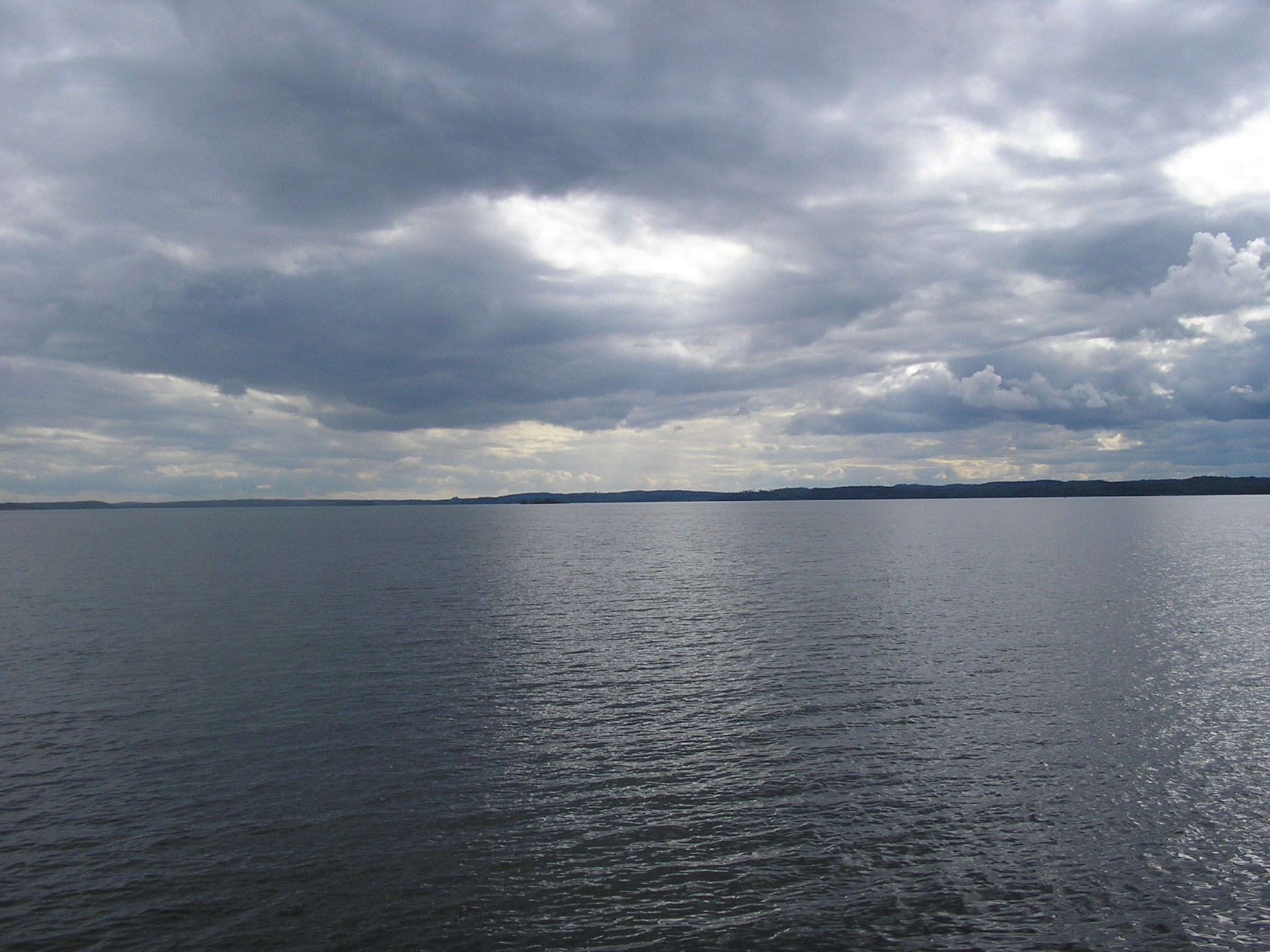
Lake Vesijärvi in Asikkala

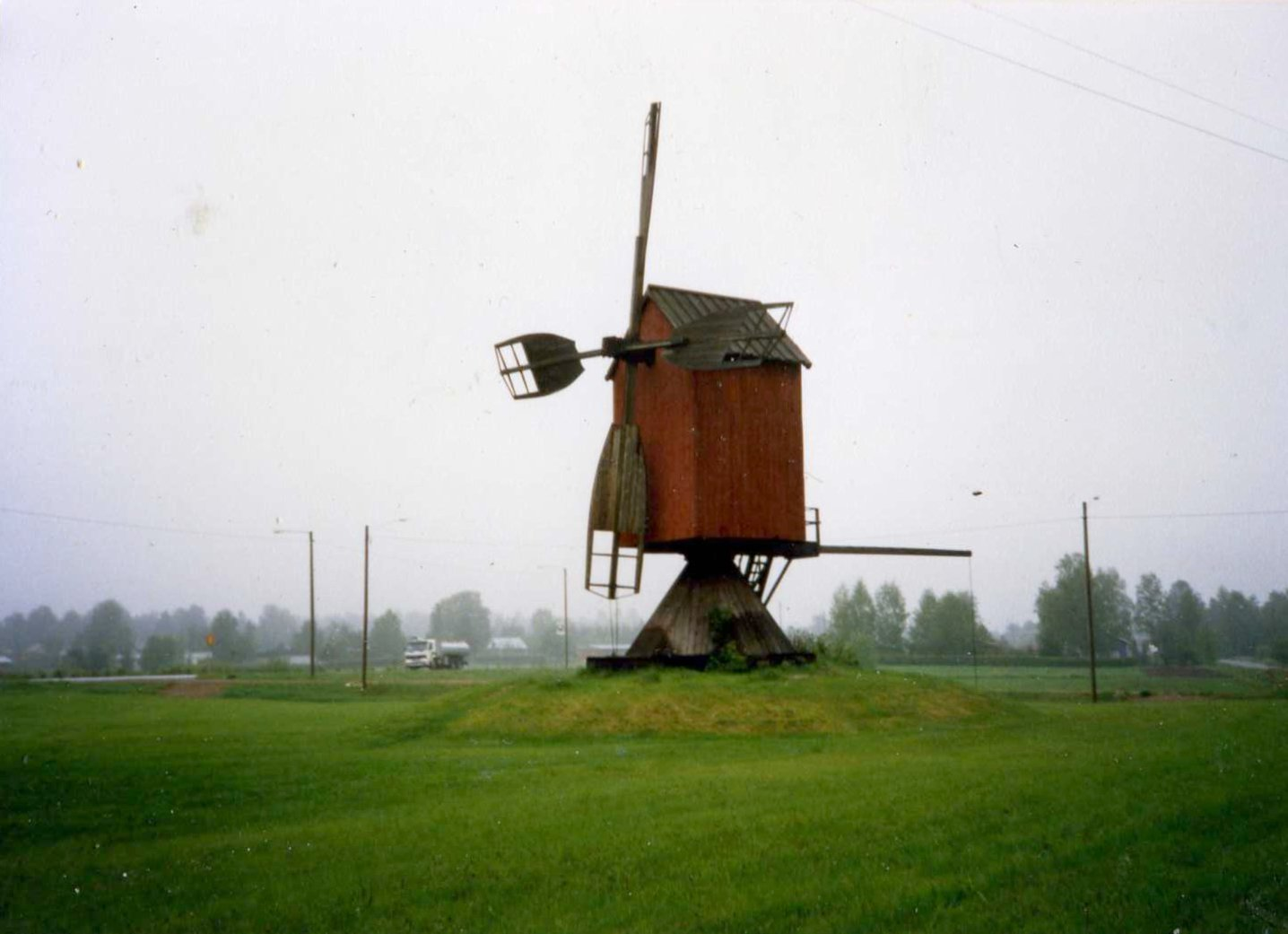
A windmill in Hartola

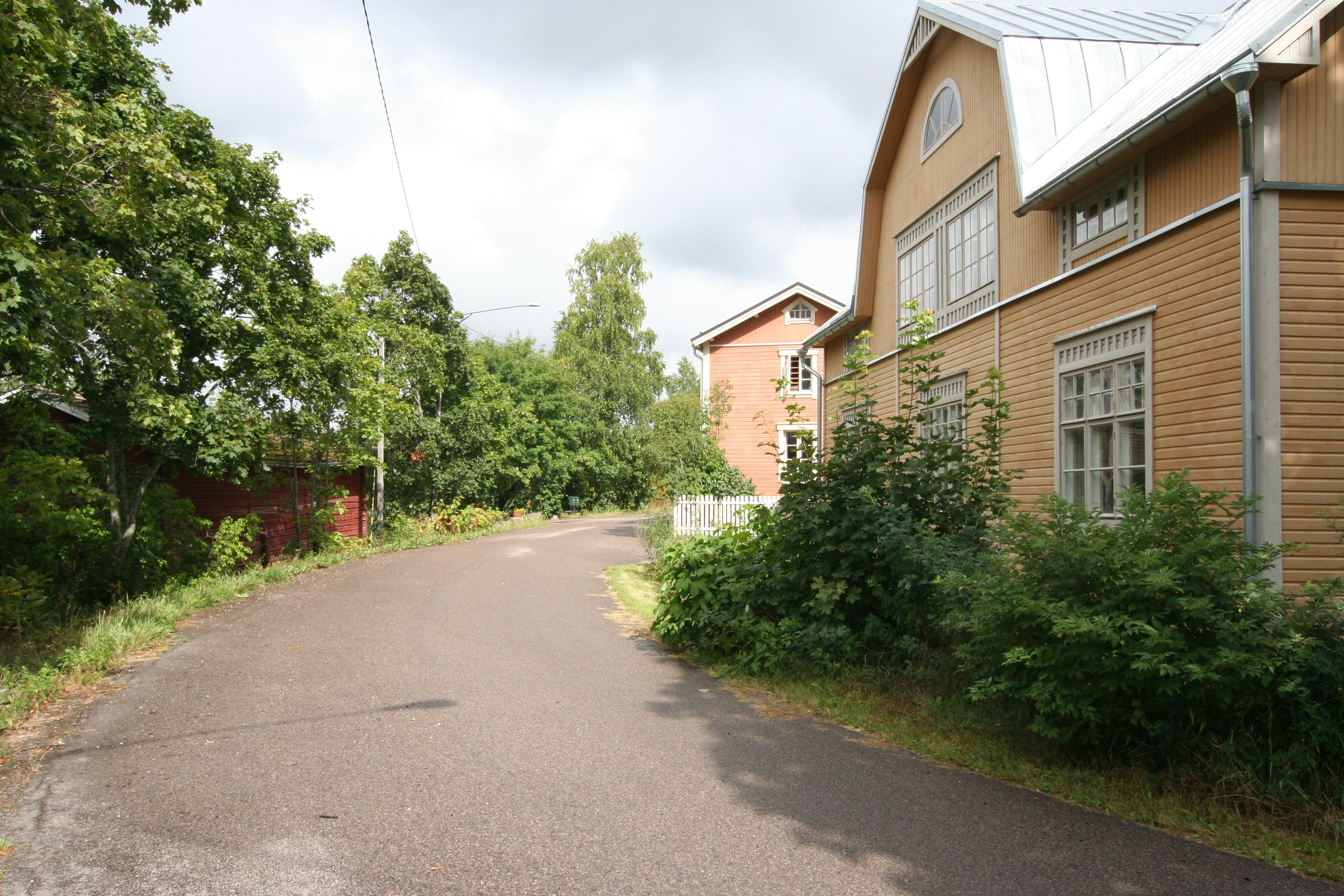
A typical traditional Tavastian village view, Orimattila

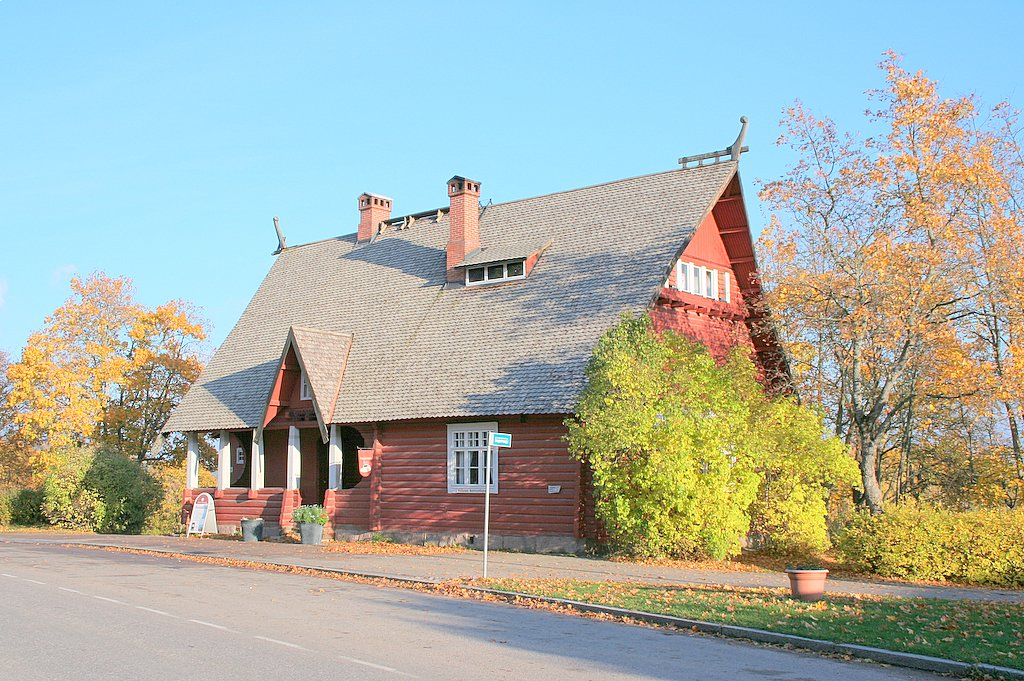
National romantic municipal house in Hollola

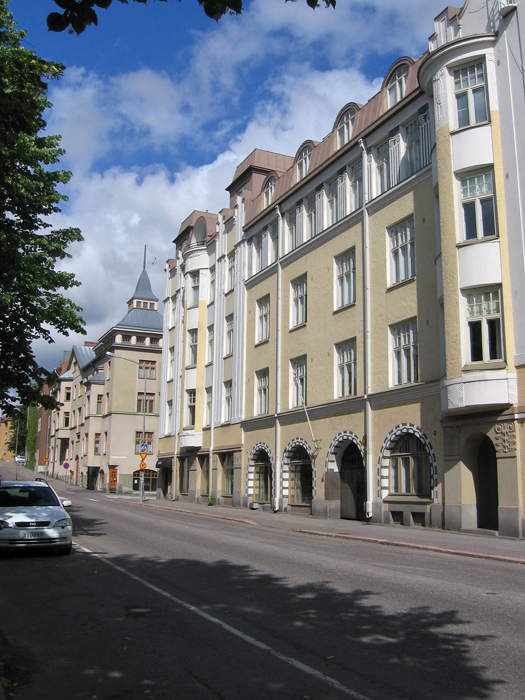
Architecture in Lahti

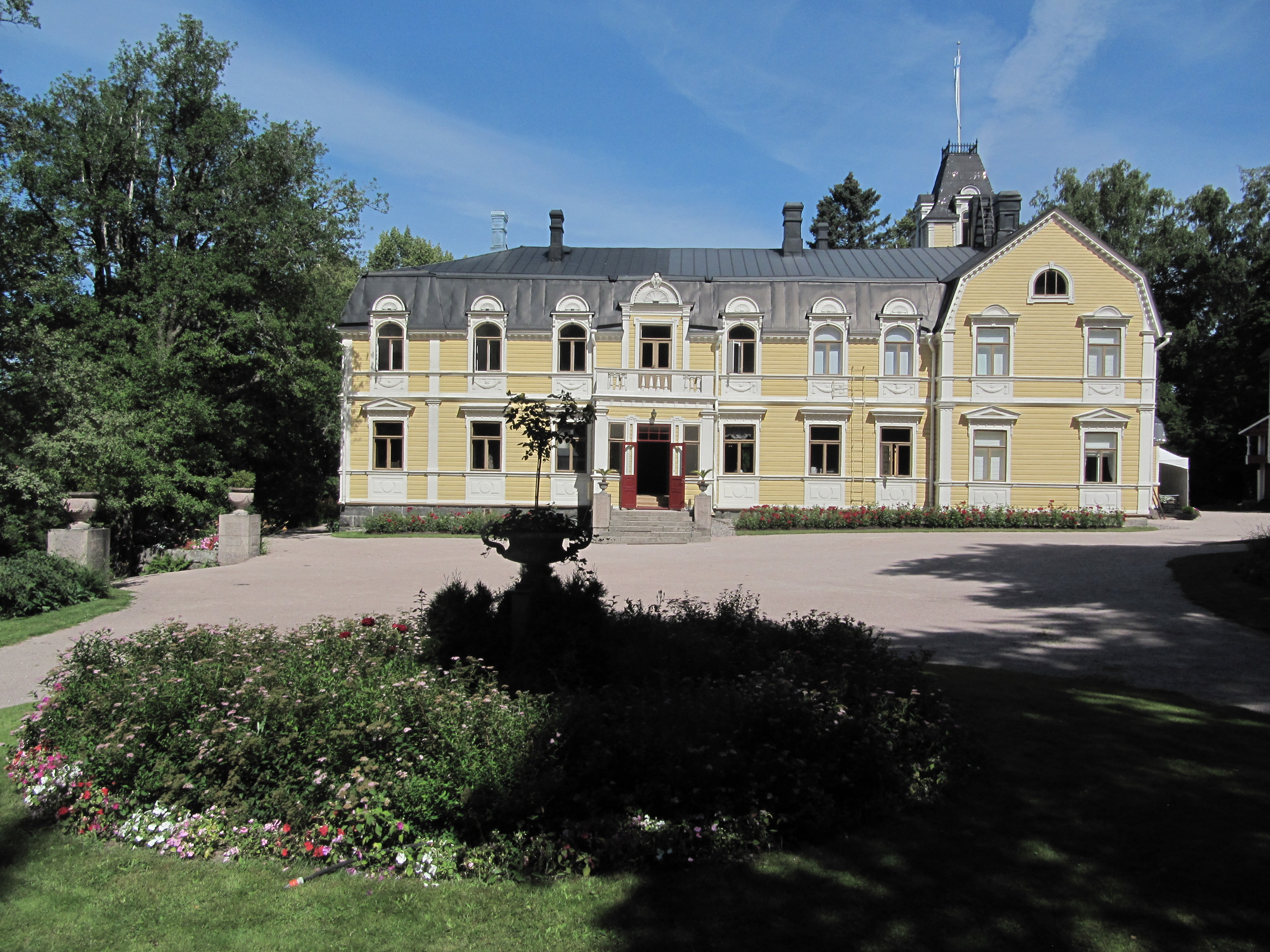
Pyhäniemi Manor, Hollola

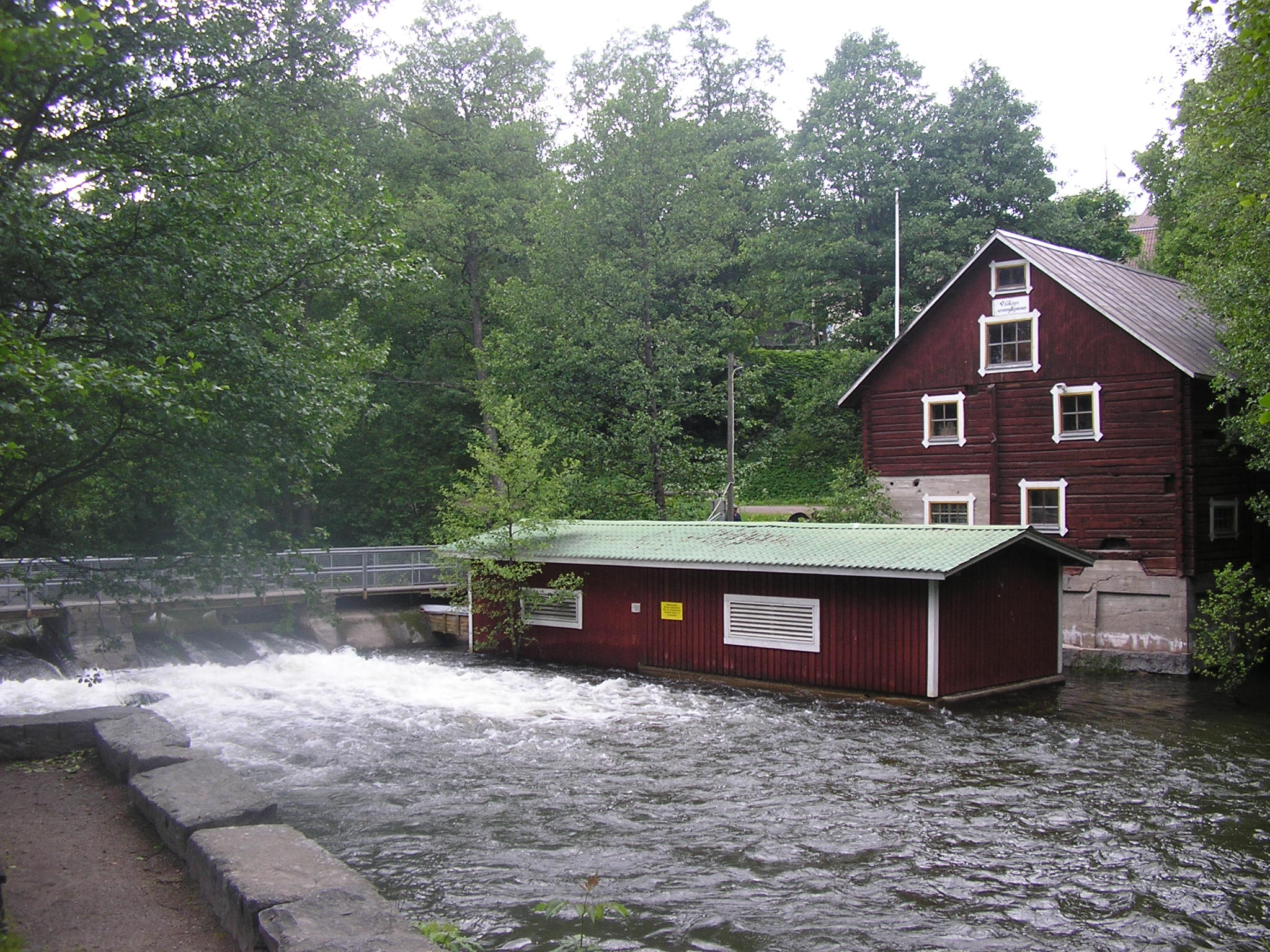
An old mill at River Vääksynjoki, Asikkala

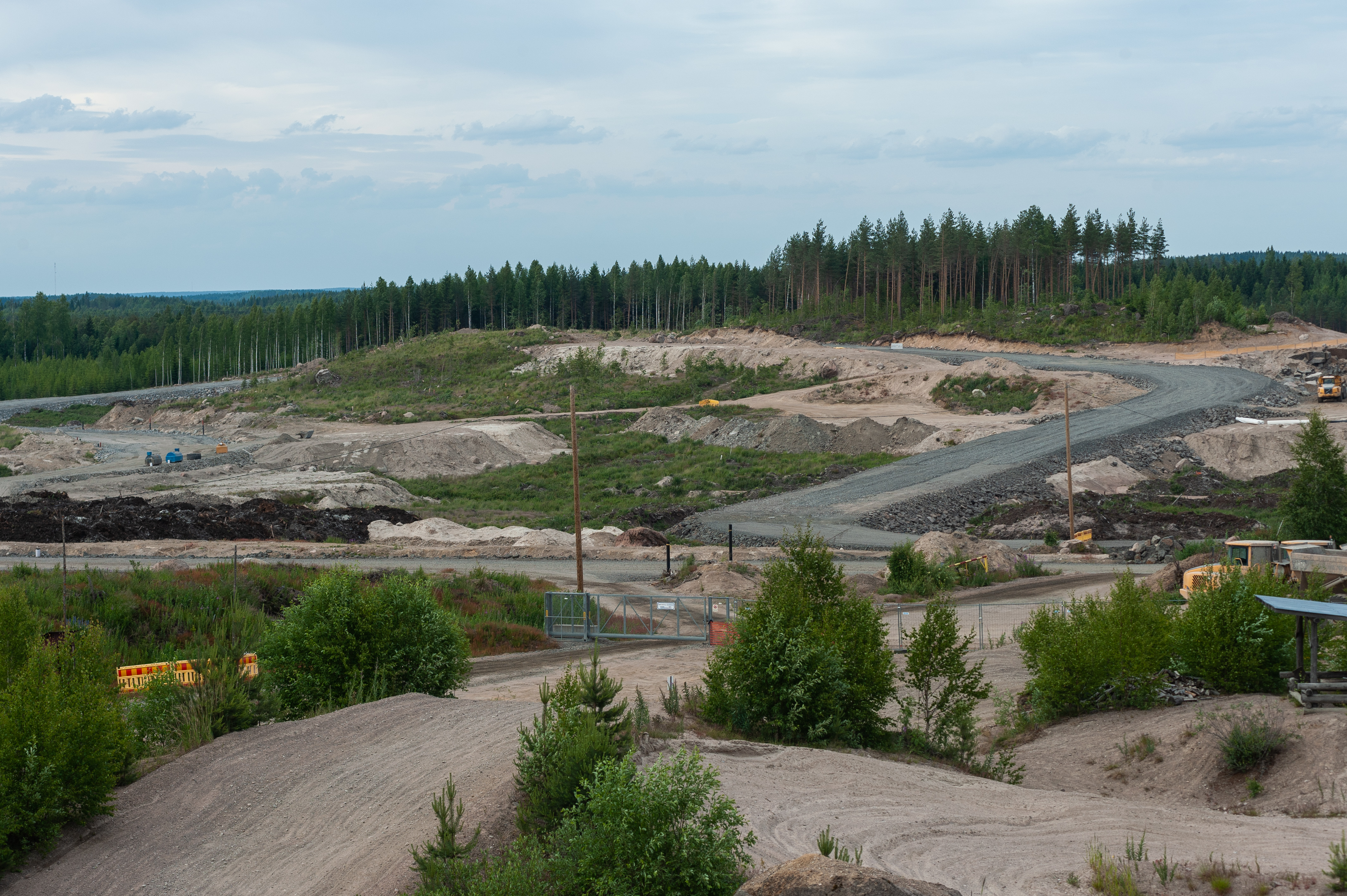
Kymi Ring, a motor racing circuit in Kausala, Iitti
