= Lahti–Loviisa railway =

Railway line in Finland

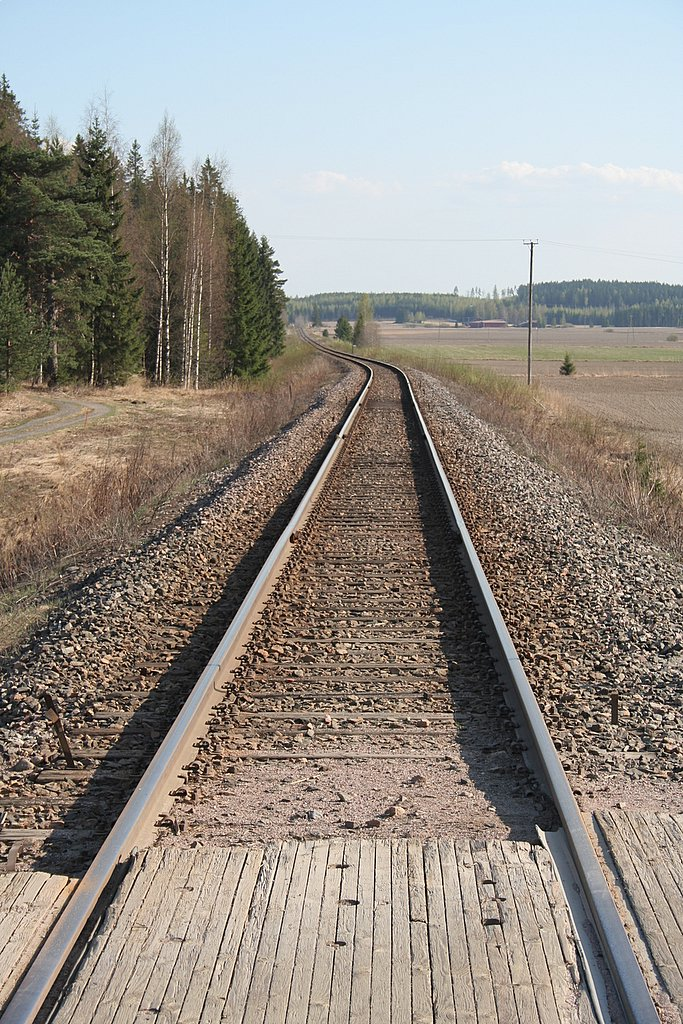
- The Lahti–Loviisa railway in Pennala, Orimattila

Overview
- Status: Open
- Owner: Finnish government
- Locale: Päijät-Häme; Uusimaa
- Termini: Lahti; Port of Loviisa

Service
- Operator(s): VR Group

History
- Opened: 2 May 1960
- Passenger services initiated: 1 March 1961
- Passenger services ceased: 31 May 1970

Technical
- Line length: 77 km (48 mi)
- Number of tracks: 1
- Track gauge: 1,524 mm (5 ft)
- Electrification: None
- Operating speed: 50–60 km/h (31–37 mph)

The Lahti–Loviisa railway (Finnish: Lahti–Loviisa-rata, Swedish: Lahtis–Lovisa-banan), also called the Loviisa railway (Finnish: Loviisan rata, Swedish: Lovisabanan) is a 1,524 mm (5 ft) railway in Finland, running between the Lahti railway station and the Port of Loviisa.

== History ==
The predecessor of the contemporary Lahti–Loviisa railway was the private narrow-gauge railway between Loviisa and Niemi in Lahti: its construction was completed on 19 February 1900, was opened for provisional traffic on 29 August 1900 and was formally inaugurated on 23 February 1904. While the idea of converting the line to the standard gauge of 5 ft (1,524 mm) was first brought up before the 1930s, it was later connected with a plan to connect inner Finland to a sea harbour via the Lahti–Heinola railway and its planned extension further north. While the gauge conversion plan was finalized by the spring of 1936, the project was put on hold due to the Second World War.

The rebuilding of the Loviisa line was brought back up in the 1950s upon the stabilizing of societal and economic conditions. The railway company saw financial trouble in the post-war period, which in 1956 culminated in Rauma-Repola Oy, its final majority shareholder, selling its stake to the Finnish state, with the rest surrendering their stakes free of charge. In 1957, the state made the decision to fully nationalize the railway and convert it to the standard gauge of 1,524 mm (5 ft).

Transport on the old narrow-gauge line was ceased on 19 April 1960, and the new railway was inaugurated on 2 May 1960. The re-initiation of passenger services followed later, on 1 March 1961. As with the privately owned railway, the operation of passenger services on the line proved unprofitable, and they were ceased on 31 May 1970. Since then, the line has only served freight transport.

The broad-gauge line saw use not only for freight to and from the Valko harbour, but also that of the Loviisa Nuclear Power Plant upon its commission. This prompted the initiation of the planning of a thorough renovation of the line in the 1980s. A committee headed by Sigurd Slätis, the head of the town of Loviisa, made appeals to the Finnish state for its backing in the project. The renovation was initiated in 1983, with the authorities of Loviisa responsible for the work in its harbour and the state for that on the main line. The project was completed in the autumn of 1986.

== Overview ==
The Lahti–Loviisa railway stretches approximately 77 kilometres (48 mi) long, consists of one track for its entire length, has a top speed limit of 50–60 km/h (31–37 mph), and is unelectrified. It runs in the north–south direction, connecting the regions of Päijät-Häme and Uusimaa. The line cuts through the municipalities of Orimattila, Myrskylä and Lapinjärvi — as well as Pernå and Liljendal, now both part of Loviisa — on its way to the southern terminus of the Valko harbour. Save for short stretch between Lahti and Ämmälä that was realigned by 6 kilometres (3.7 mi), the alignment of the line closely matches that of the narrow gauge line it replaced.

Since 1970, the line has exclusively served freight traffic, the bulk of which consists of coal bound for the Port of Loviisa from Russia. In the past, the transport of various forest industry goods has also played a significant role in the use of the line. In the present, the stations of Lahti and the Port of Loviisa are the only ones where cargo loading and unloading activities occur: the operating points of the Orimattila and Lapinjärvi stations are still active, though they are only used for the purposes of track maintenance.

A distinctive feature of the line is its abundance of level crossings: there are 115 in total, only 10 of which have automated warning systems.
