= Ämmälä =

- District of Lahti
- Interactive map of Ämmälä
- Coordinates: 60°56′0″N 25°41′30″E
- Country: Finland
- Region: Päijät-Häme
- Municipality: Lahti

Population (2019)
  - Total: 441
- (approximate)
- Postal codes: 15680
- District number: 21

Ämmälä (Finnish: ['æmːælæ]) is the 21st district and a village of the city of Lahti, in the region of Päijät-Häme, Finland. It borders the districts of Kerinkallio in the north, Kujala in the northeast, Villähde in the east, Renkomäki in the west and Nikkilä in the northwest, as well as the town of Orimattila in the south. Ämmälä is largely rural in character with its thinly spread population and extensive forest and field areas. The center of the village consists of four estates - Jussila, Ristola, Ahola and Heikkilä, which surround a four-way road junction.

By a governmental decree made on 29 October 1954, Ämmälä was annexed to Lahti from Orimattila on 1 January 1956.

The combined population of the statistical district of Ämmälä was 441 in 2019.
