= Järvenpää, Lahti =

Järvenpää
- District of Lahti
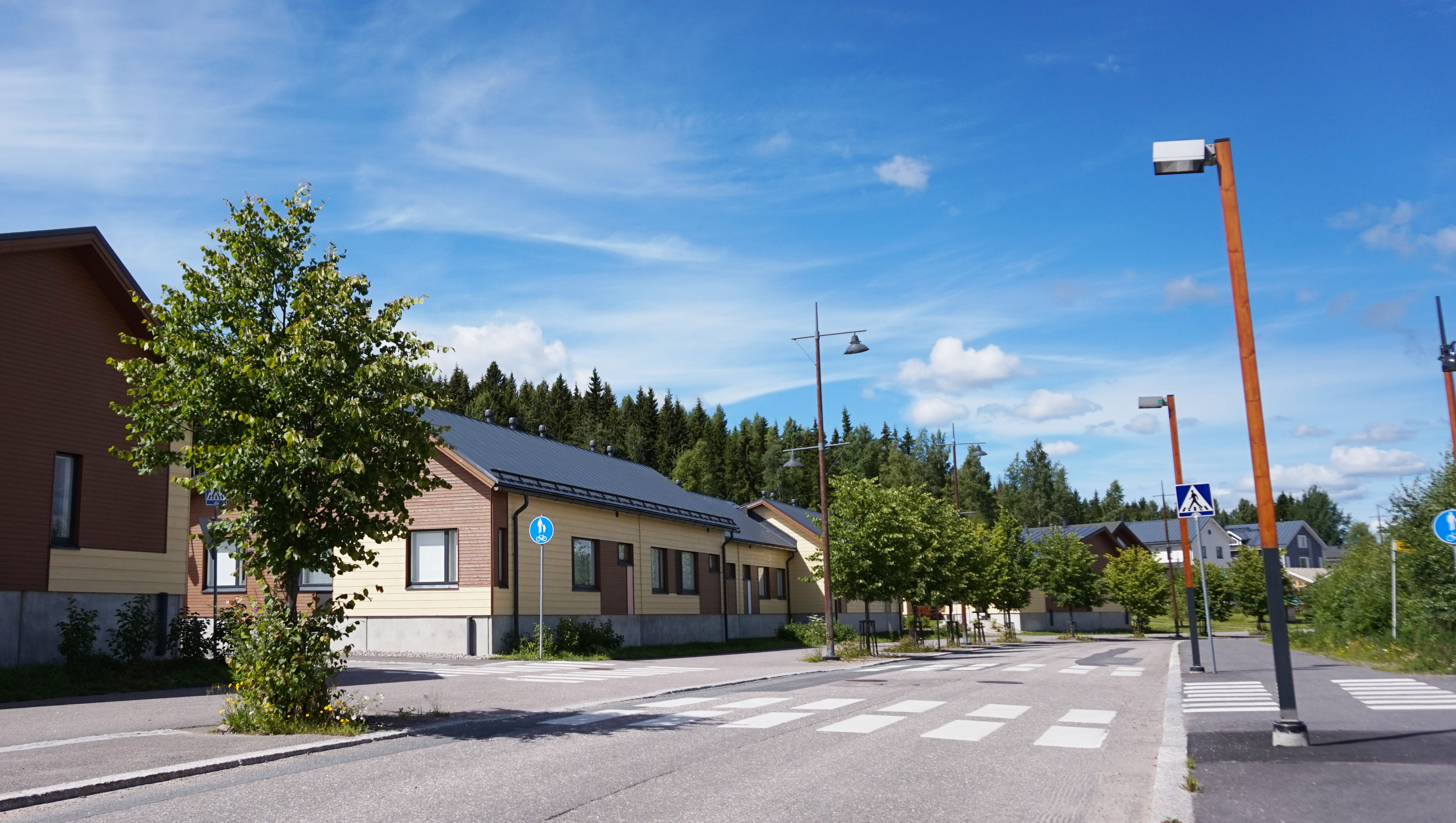
- Kariston rantatie street in Järvenpää
- Interactive map of Järvenpää
- Coordinates: 60°58′48″N 25°44′24″E
- Country: Finland
- Region: Päijät-Häme
- Municipality: Lahti

Population (2019)
  - Total: 2,706
- (approximate)
- Postal codes: 15610
- District number: 17

Järvenpää is the 17th district of the city of Lahti, in the region of Päijät-Häme, Finland. It borders the districts of Myllypohja in the north, Kolava in the east, Kujala in the south and Möysä in the west.

The population of the statistical district of Karisto, which covers Järvenpää as well as Kolava, was 2,706 in 2019.

== History ==
Järvenpää is presumed to be the oldest permanently inhabited area in Lahti; it is presumed to date to the year 925, as per results from radiocarbon dating. It is first documented as an independent village in 1564 under the name of Jousijärvi, and it only consisted of one estate, Anttila. By 1568, the number of estates had increased to four. The contemporary name of the area stems from its historical center's location on the shore of lake Joutjärvi; järvenpää can be translated as "[the] end of [the] lake".

The nominal area of the district of Järvenpää has grown significantly at the expense of Kolava, due to political reasons related to the development of the residential area of Karisto. This stems from the name of Kolava being heavily associated with the landfill in the district.
