= Finnish regional road 167 =

Road in Finland

Regional Road 167
- Yhdystie 167 (Finnish); Förbindelseväg 167 (Swedish)
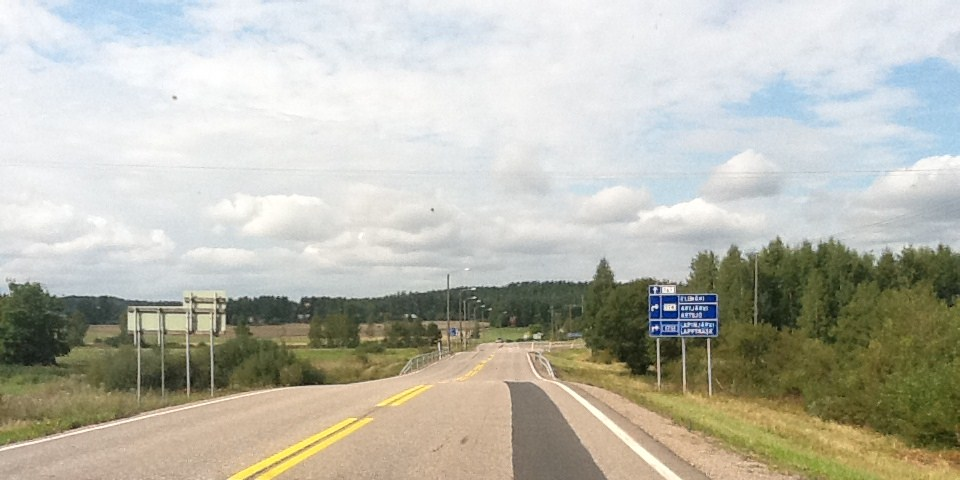

Route information
- Length: 70 km (43 mi)

Major junctions
- From: Lahti
- To: Loviisa

Location
- Country: Finland

Highway system
- Highways in Finland

Finnish regional road 167 (Finnish: Seututie 167, Swedish: Regionalväg 167) is a north–south road, which in the north starts from the city centre of Lahti in the Päijät-Häme region and continues south through the centres of Orimattila and Myrskylä all the way to the Loviisa's Koskenkylä in the Uusimaa region. The road condition is relatively poor.

Traffic volumes on the road vary greatly on different sections. Between the centre of Lahti and Renkomäki, traffic volumes average around 14,000 vehicles/day, and between Renkomäki and Orimattila around 7,000–10,000 vehicles/day. These sections correspond to a busy highway in terms of traffic volumes. Between Orimattila and Myrskylä, the average traffic volume on the road is 1,500 vehicles/day, which is typical for main roads, and between Myrskylä and Koskenkylä, the traffic volume on the road is mainly less than a thousand vehicles/day.

Regional road 167 has been proposed as a class II main road to be upgraded.

== Route ==
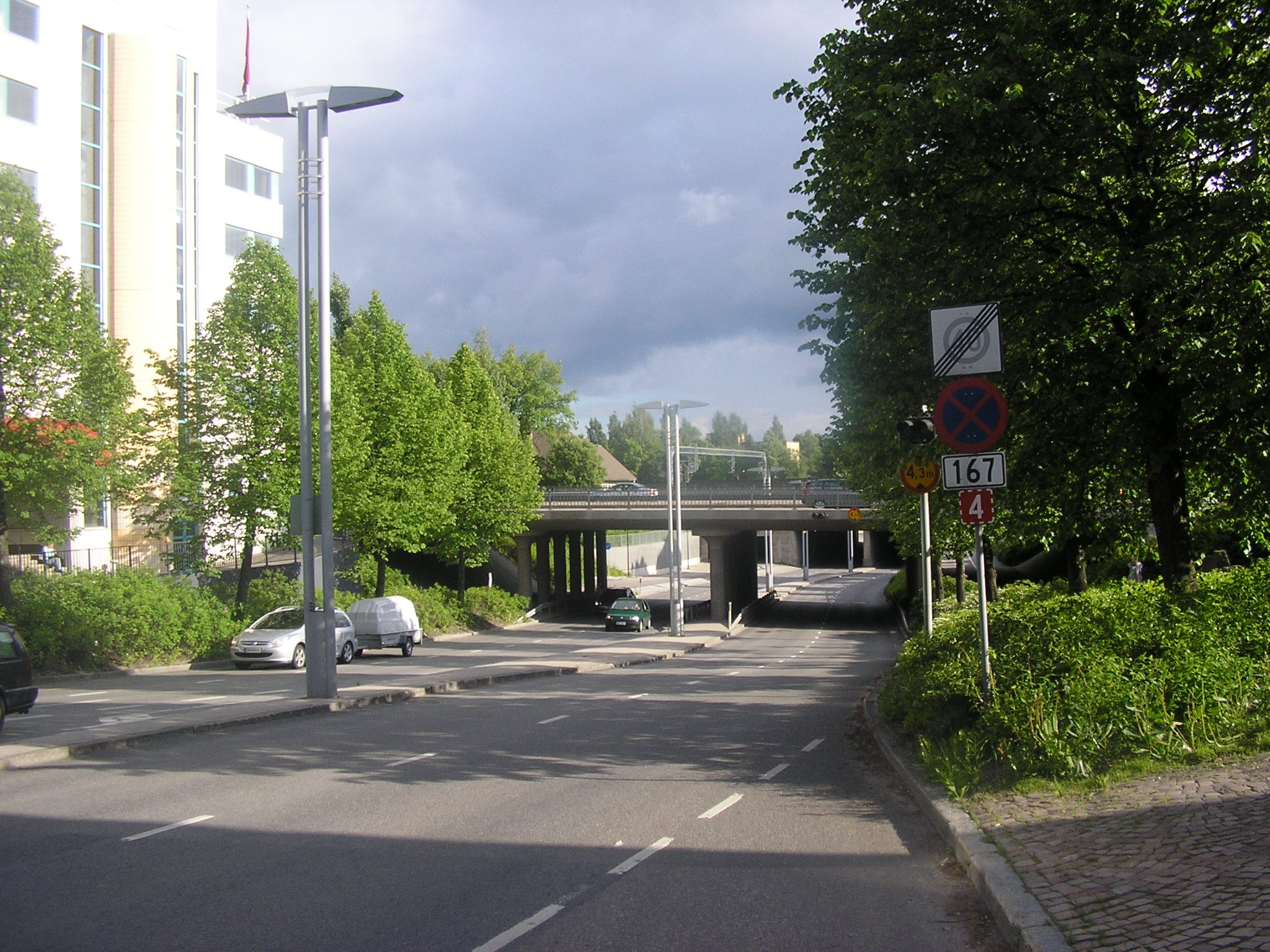
The road in the centre of Lahti

- Lahti
  - Keski-Lahti
  - Renkomäki
- Orimattila
  - Pennala
  - Virenoja
  - Orimattila
  - Pakaa
- Myrskylä
  - Kylmäsuo
  - Kirkonkylä
- Loviisa
  - Koskenkylä
