= Kreivilä =

Kreivilä Grevnäs
- Village
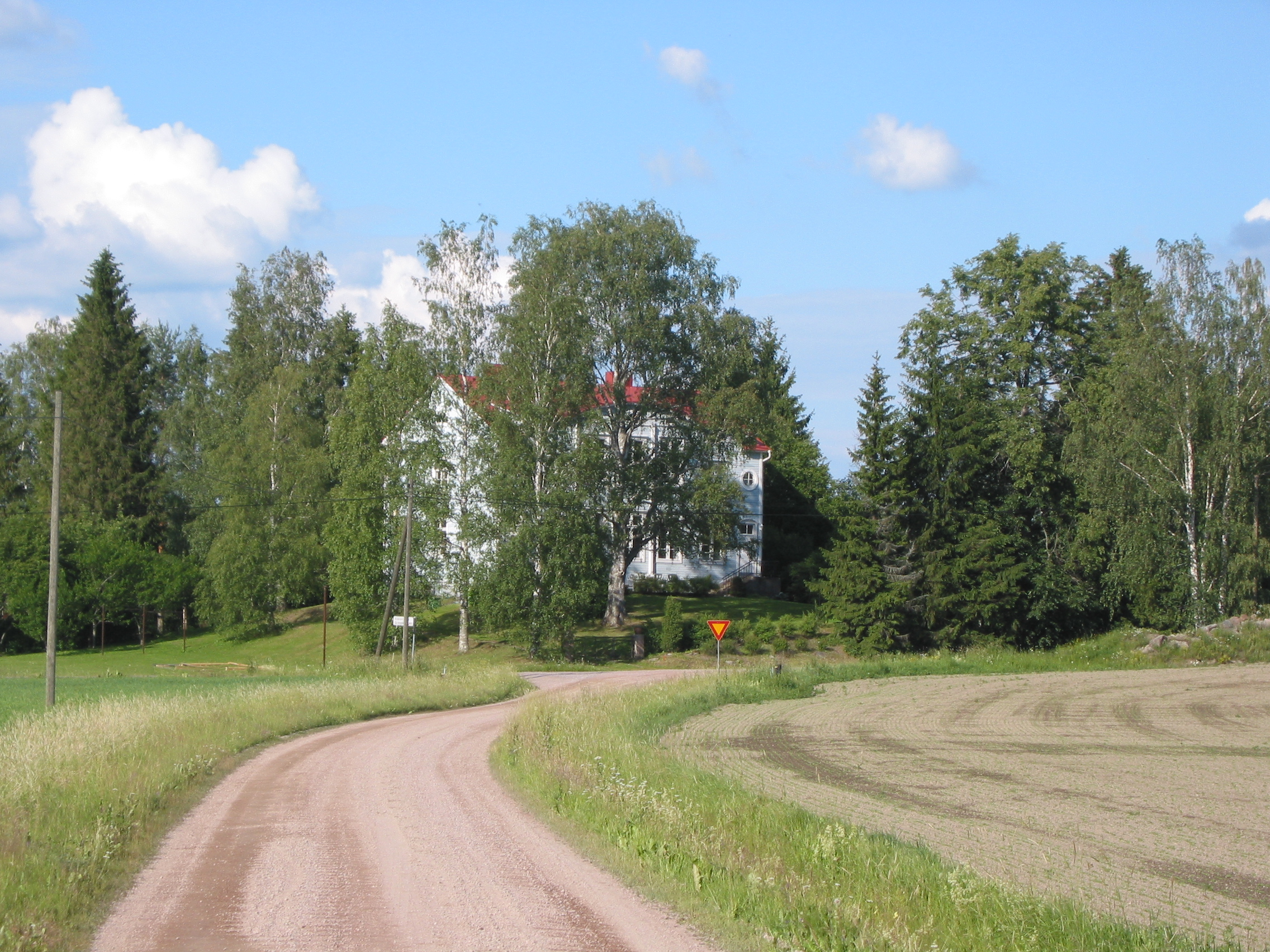
- Former village school in Kreivilä.

- Location in Finland
- Coordinates: 60°37′28″N 25°58′55″E
- Country: Finland
- Region: Uusimaa
- Municipality: Myrskylä
- Time zone: UTC+2 (EET)
  - Summer (DST): UTC+3 (EEST)
- Postal code: 07890

Kreivilä (Swedish: Grevnäs) is a village in Myrskylä municipality in Eastern Uusimaa in Finland. It is located in the southeast part of the municipality, along the road from Myrskylä to Liljendal and Loviisa. The Lahti–Loviisa railway is located to the east of the village.

The villages of Kreivilä are fragmented, mainly farms, and there is no actual village center; the unofficial center of the village is the building of the former village school in Kreivilä, which was founded in 1907.
