= Pöyrysjärvi (Myrskylä) =

Lake in Myrskylä, Finland

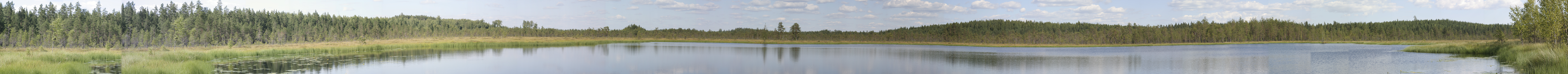
- Panorama view from the northern beach

- Location within Finland
- Location: southeastern Finland
- Coordinates: 60°42′53.70″N 25°50′6.90″E
- Primary outflows: Koskenkylänjoki
- Basin countries: Finland
- Surface area: 0.02 km^{2} (0.0077 sq mi)
- Average depth: 3 m (9.8 ft)
- Max. depth: 4 m (13 ft)
- Surface elevation: 61.3 m (201 ft)
- Settlements: Myrskylä, Orimattila

Pöyrysjärvi is a lake surrounded by the open bog on the border are of the town of Orimattila and municipality of Myrskylä. It is classed as a precious natural reserve in Päijänne Tavastia county. Apart from that the city of Orimattila classifies it as an important object for teaching of marsh types and its fauna.

The other lakes connected to the Myrskylänjoki watershed are Isojärvi, Vähäjärvi, Muttilanjärvi, Siippo, Sopajärvi, Kirkkojärvi and Sulkavanjärvi.

== Environmental issues ==
The town of Orimattila measures every fifth or sixth year some parametres related to the water. 10 July 2006 the results were:

- solids: 0,029 g/L
- oxygen-%: 24.0 (on the surface) / 8.87 mL/L (on the surface), 11.3% (on the bottom) / 1.1 mL/L (on the bottom)
- Redox pot. (Mv): 307.0
- pH: 4.2
- total phosphor: 15 μg/L
- total nitrogen: 380 μg/L
- total chlorophyll: 15 μg/L

== Sources ==
- Jarviwiki
