= Laune (disambiguation) =

Laune is a district of Lahti, a city in Finland.

Laune may also refer to:

- River Laune, a river in Ireland
- Paul Laune (1899–1977), American illustrator
