= Pakila, Myrskylä =

Pakila Backböle
- Village
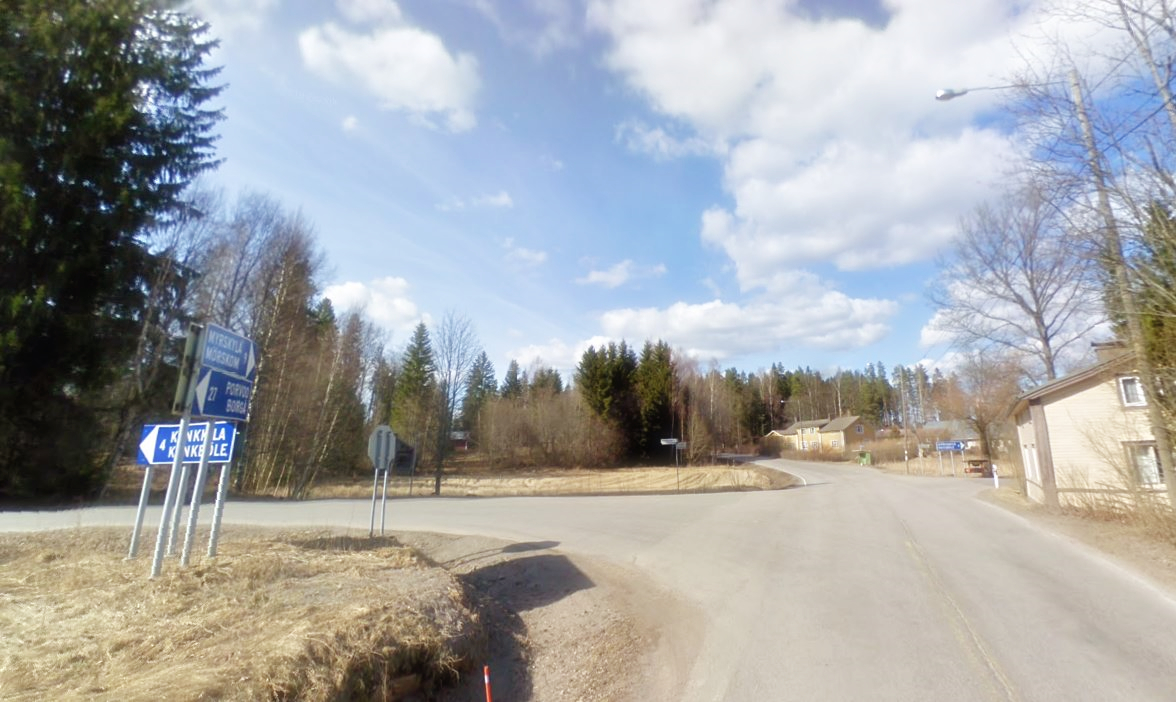
- In the middle of village.

- Location in Finland
- Coordinates: 60°35′37″N 25°48′32″E
- Country: Finland
- Region: Uusimaa
- Municipality: Myrskylä
- Time zone: UTC+2 (EET)
  - Summer (DST): UTC+3 (EEST)
- Postal code: 07680

Pakila (Swedish: Backböle) is a village in Myrskylä municipality in Eastern Uusimaa. It is located in the southern part of the municipality, from the Myrskylä's church village along the Porvoo road (Porvoontie) leading to Porvoo. To the south of Pakila is the Juornaankylä village of Askola. There are three lakes in the vicinity of Pakila: Kotojärvi, Pimijärvi and Valkjärvi.

There is a small wooden building on the outskirts of Pakila sports field, where Pakilan Klubi ry is located.
