= Petrus Serlachius =

Finnish Lutheran clergyman

- Born: 16 March 1655; Borgå parish, Finland
- Died: 20 October 1738 (aged 83); Pernå, Finland
- Occupation: Lutheran clergyman

Petrus Serlachius (1655–1738) was a Finnish Lutheran clergyman and church leader in the late 17th and early 18th centuries. He served as vicar of Pernå for 57 years and was a prominent representative of Lutheran orthodoxy in Finland, then part of the Swedish Empire. During the Greater Wrath (1713–1721), the Russian occupation of Finland, he played a central role in maintaining ecclesiastical and civil order.

== Biography ==
=== Background and education ===
The name Serlachius derives from Särklax manor in Pernå, the family's ancestral seat. The estate had been established by Anders Bartholdi, vicar of Lappträsk, and inherited by his daughter Gertrud. Her husband Daniel Welamsson was a successful tax collector, and their son Johan Danielsson, a mining master who held the royal estate of Strömsberg, married the wealthy Anna Thorwöste. Of their sons, Daniel took the surname Starman, while Petrus and Johannes adopted the name Serlachius when they began their schooling.

The brothers Petrus and Johannes Serlachius first attended the trivial school in Helsingfors — an elementary Latin school — before continuing their studies at Viborg Gymnasium and at the Academy of Åbo. There they were privately tutored by Petrus Bång, who later became Bishop of Viborg. Petrus Serlachius appeared in an academic context for the first time in 1675 as respondent at Bång's disputation, and in 1677 he defended a thesis by Martin Miltopaeus. Both brothers also studied in Uppsala, but only Johannes completed a master's degree. Johannes later became a lecturer at Viborg Gymnasium and vicar in Kexholm and Helsingfors, before fleeing to Sweden in 1713, where he served as vicar of Östra Husby in Östergötland. On their mother's side, the brothers were cousins of the radical pietist Peter Schäfer, though they did not share his views.

=== Vicar of Pernå ===
Petrus Serlachius chose an ecclesiastical career over an academic one. In 1679 he was called to serve as vicar of Borgå, but the position went to another candidate. As compensation, the king granted him an exspektans — a preferential right to the next vacant vicarage in a royal parish within the Diocese of Viborg, a form of patronage granted to able clergymen who had been passed over for positions matching their merits.

His academic mentor Petrus Bång, who appears to have been his patron, ordained him in 1680 at Pernå church — a location that foreshadowed his future career. Bång was at this time superintendent in Narva. Serlachius subsequently served for a period as house chaplain to Ernst Johan Creutz, president of the Åbo Court of Appeal.

When his father-in-law Zacharias Stachaeus, vicar of Pernå, died in 1681, Serlachius succeeded him in the position. He would go on to serve as vicar of his home parish for a total of 57 years. He was appointed rural dean of Nyland in 1690, served as a member of the Diet of the Estates in 1693 and 1697, and was appointed president of the diocesan synod in 1699.

=== The Greater Wrath ===
During the Greater Wrath, the Russian military occupation of Finland between 1713 and 1721, Serlachius remained at his post in Pernå rather than fleeing to Sweden as many of his clerical colleagues did. He continued to lead his congregation while taking on extensive civil responsibilities: he procured supplies for the occupying forces, managed various administrative matters, and interceded on behalf of his parishioners to protect them from excessive burdens. When both the Bishop of Viborg and the chairman of the interim consistory in Borgå had left the country, Serlachius assumed leadership of the consistory — the regional church administrative body — during the final years of the occupation. In this capacity he ordained candidates for the priesthood, and when necessary even young men who had not yet completed their theological studies.

=== After the peace ===
After the Treaty of Nystad in 1721, Serlachius continued to participate in the work of the chapter in 1722–1724, helping to hand over wartime church leadership to the new bishop, Johannes Gezelius the Younger. During this transitional period, as during the exceptional wartime years, the chapter frequently convened in the "bishop's chamber" at Särklax manor, reflecting Serlachius's standing as an adviser to the bishop.

Serlachius enjoyed broad support within his congregation, as was evident when his son Peter was called to succeed him as vicar by an almost unanimous vote after his death. His patriarchal position was further strengthened by his ownership of Särklax manor and extensive landholdings. He was involved in several property disputes, but also practised charity, annually inviting all the poor of the parish to a meal at the manor on the feast of Saint Peter. He himself reportedly kept a strict diet in both food and drink, which may have contributed to his reaching an advanced age.

=== Theology and the pietist conflict ===
Serlachius exercised his ministry in accordance with Lutheran orthodoxy, emphasising the sacraments, catechetical instruction, church discipline and pastoral care. He opposed pietist currents, particularly the Halle Pietism that had taken root on some of the noble estates in his parish. The conflict came to a head in his dealings with General Carl Gustaf Armfelt, whose court chaplain Johann Nicolaus Reuter — trained at the Francke Foundations in Halle — held private devotional gatherings attended not only by the household but also by servants and outsiders. Serlachius considered these gatherings a threat to the unity of the parish congregation, while Armfelt defended them by invoking the privileges of the nobility. A final confrontation came in 1736 at the occasion of Armfelt's funeral, when the family engaged a pietist-sympathising clergyman rather than Serlachius to conduct the service, which deeply offended him.

=== Family ===
Serlachius was married three times, each time to a woman of noble birth. His first wife, Elsa Stachaea, died in childbed in 1703 after having borne eleven children. His second wife, Anna Maria Christina Huggut, also died of childbed fever, and their only child died in infancy. Through this marriage Serlachius became related to the Stierncreutz family and acquired Fasarby manor. His third wife, Brita Catharina Bosin, was a wealthy woman who continued to live at Särklax after her husband's death. At his death in 1738, Petrus Serlachius left 96 descendants across four generations.
