= Joutjärvi Church =

- Joutjärven kirkko
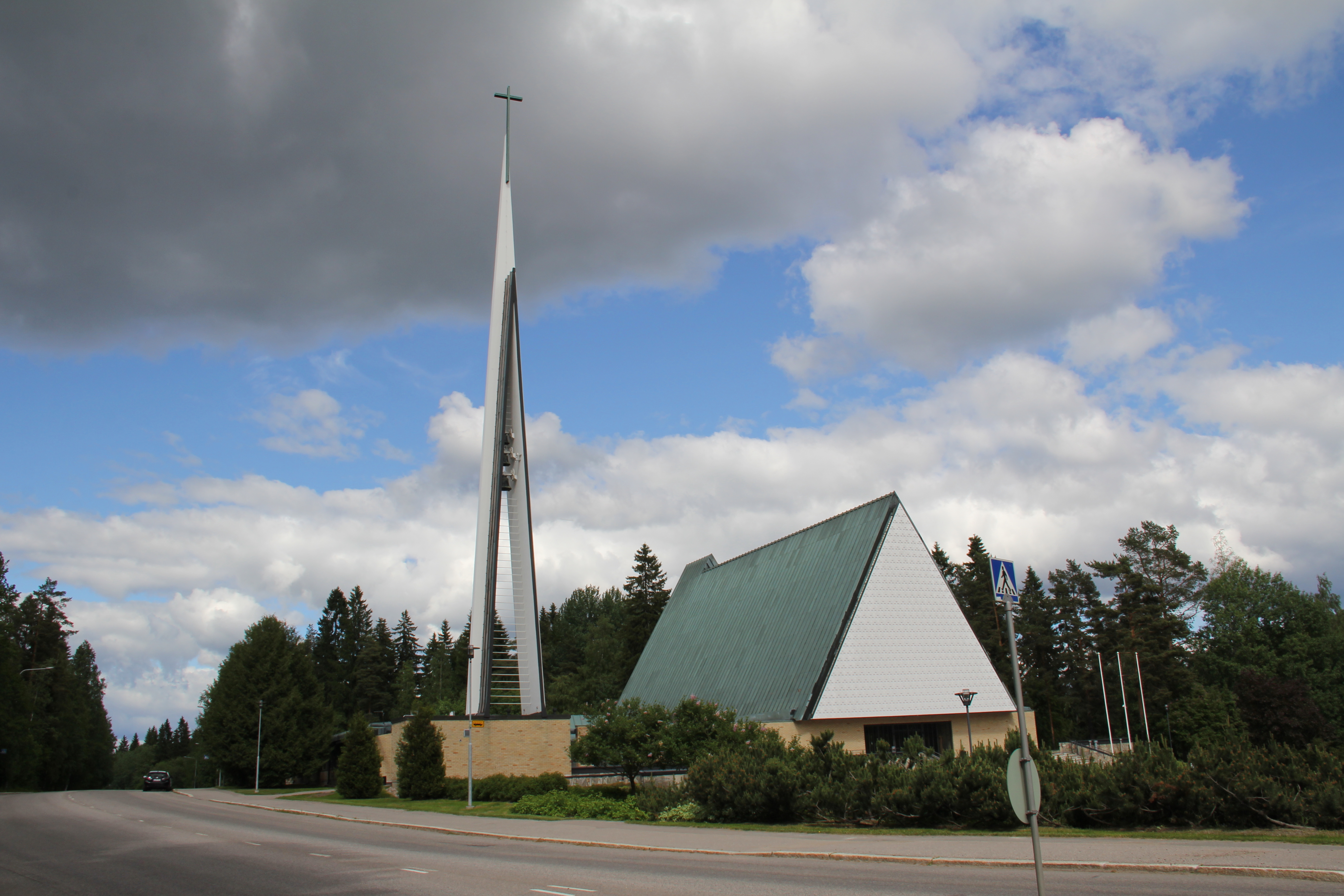
- Joutjärvi Church in 2016
- Joutjärvi Church
- 60.984722°N 25.702778°E
- Location: Möysä, Lahti
- Country: Finland
- Denomination: Lutheran

History
- Status: Parish church

Architecture
- Functional status: Active
- Architect: Unto Ojonen
- Architectural type: Modernism
- Completed: 1962

Specifications
- Capacity: 650 + 250 (parish hall)
- Materials: Yellow brick, slate, concrete, copper (roof)

Administration
- Parish: Joutjärven seurakunta (Joutjärvi Parish)

Joutjärvi Church (Finnish: Joutjärven kirkko) is a Lutheran church in the Möysä district of Lahti, Finland. It serves the eastern inner city neighbourhoods, with a total parish population of 16,500.

== Architecture ==
Designed in 1960-61 and completed in 1962, the building is the work of local architect Unto Ojonen, responsible for many buildings in Lahti from the 1950-60s.

The church design is characterised by its steeply pitched roof — something of an Ojonen signature feature — and slim belfry. The building complex integrates a parish hall and staff quarters. The exterior materials include yellow brick and slate, under a copper roof. The building was comprehensively refurbished in 2005–2006, and a new remote-operated church organ installed in 2014.

== Art ==
The altar piece, titled Golgata ('Calvary'), and exterior relief Kymmenen neitsyttä, were created by sculptor Pentti Papinaho in 1963.

The liturgical textiles were designed by Helena Vaari in 1990–1995.
