= Oscar Johansson (politician) =

Finnish politician

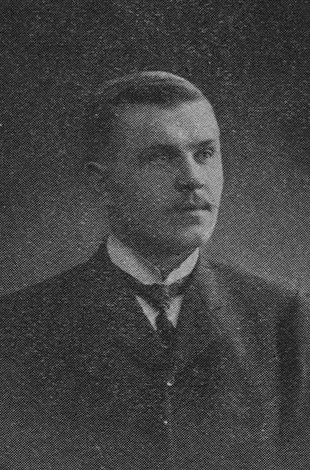

Oscar Wilhelm Johansson (22 February 1882, Pernå - 31 May 1947) was a Finnish lawyer, civil servant and politician. He was a member of the Parliament of Finland from 1907 to 1908, representing the Social Democratic Party of Finland (SDP).
