= Möysä =

- District of Lahti
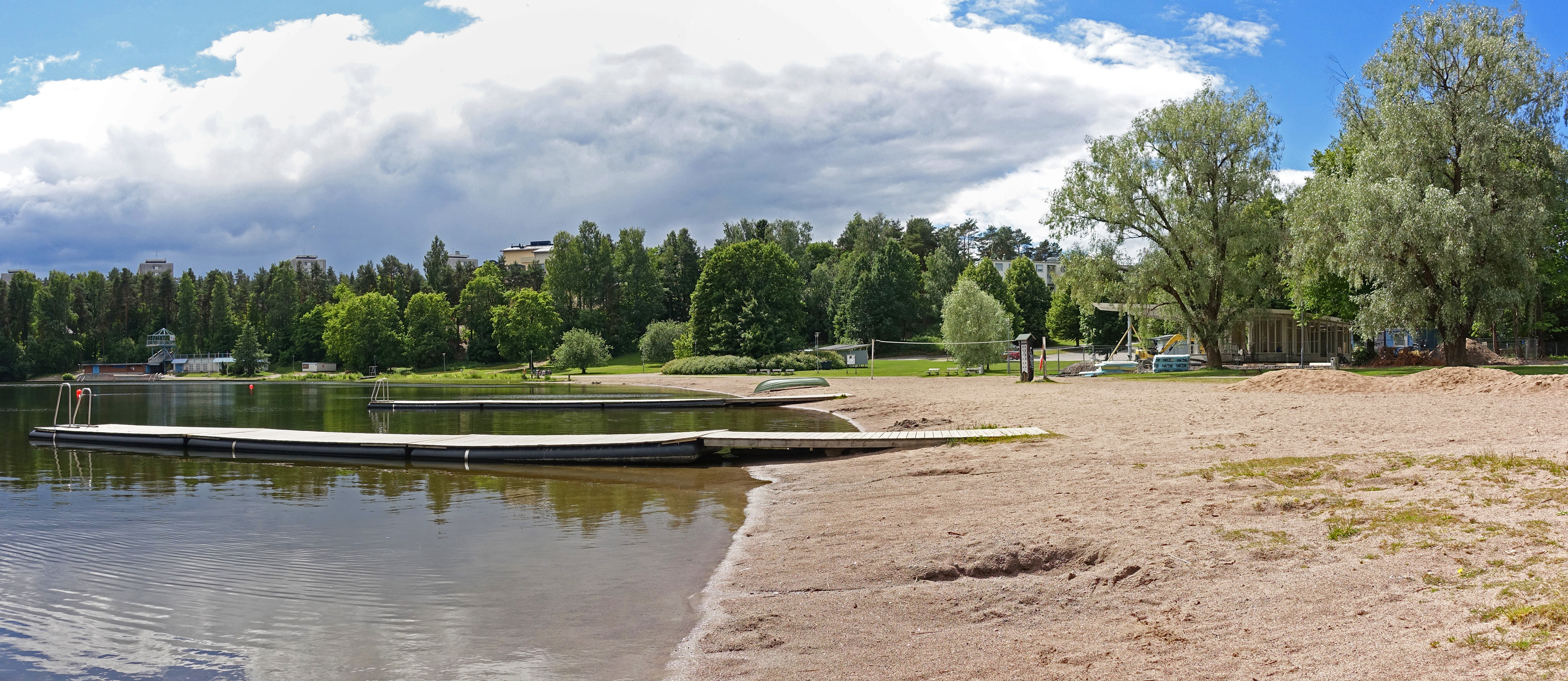
- The shore of Joutjärvi in western Möysä
- Interactive map of Möysä
- Coordinates: 60°58′47.64″N 25°42′2.16″E
- Country: Finland
- Region: Päijät-Häme
- Municipality: Lahti

Population (2019)
  - Total: 6,712
- (approximate)
- Postal codes: 15150
- District number: 16
- Neighbouring districts: Keski-Lahti; Paavola; Kiveriö; Myllypohja; Järvenpää; Kujala; Kerinkallio; Asemantausta

Möysä is the 16th district of the city of Lahti, in the region of Päijät-Häme, Finland.

The population of the statistical district of Möysä was 6,712 in 2019.

== Etymology ==
The (antiquated) word möysä means a sauna doubling as a shelter, constructed in a partly underground hole. It may be of Sami origin, but the area has also been favored by Tavastian hunter-gatherers. It is presumed that the shores of lake Joutjärvi had numerous möysäs for use by travellers during the village of Lahti's time as a significant place of commerce during the 1600s.

== History ==
Möysä was traditionally part of the village of Järvenpää, which is presumed to be the oldest permanently inhabited area in Lahti. It took until the 1800s for these residencies to spread from the eastern shore of Joutjärvi to the area that currently constitutes Möysä, towards the village of Lahti. The Louna manor was built in the mid-1800s by the road that is presently known as Harjulankatu. Towards the end of the century, estates were mostly founded by the roads leading to Vyborg and Heinola, in addition to a community that sprung up on the turn of the millennium on the lands of Harjunaro, by the road now known as Seppälänkatu. Thanks to the steady growth of the area, a kansakoulu was founded in Möysä in 1906.

As the Finnish army was split up and effectively absorbed by the Imperial Russian Army during the first period of Russification, the first Russian company to arrive in Lahti at the end of 1909 was temporarily housed in the Ionoff valenki factory in Möysä. This later led to the foundation of the garrison in Hennala. During the Battle of Lahti of the Finnish Civil War, the hilly surroundings of Möysä around the Joutjärvi saw battle as Detachment Brandenstein of the Whites advanced from the east towards the city, having cut off the Riihimäki–Saint Petersburg railway in Villähde.

Möysä was annexed to the city of Lahti from the parish of Hollola in 1933.
