= Artjärvi =

Former municipality in Päijät-Häme, Finland

Artjärvi Artsjö
- Former municipality
- Artjärven kunta Artsjö kommun
- Coat of arms

- Location of Artjärvi in Finland
- Coordinates: 60°44.8′N 026°03.2′E
- Country: Finland
- Region: Päijät-Häme
- Sub-region: Lahti sub-region
- Charter: 1865
- Consolidated: 2011

Government
  - Municipal manager: Kimmo Kuparinen

Area
  - Total: 197.33 km^{2} (76.19 sq mi)
  - Land: 177.01 km^{2} (68.34 sq mi)
  - Water: 20.32 km^{2} (7.85 sq mi)

Population (2010-10-31)
  - Total: 1,412
  - Density: 7.977/km^{2} (20.66/sq mi)

Population by native language
  - Finnish: 97.8% (official)
  - Swedish: 0.8%
  - Others: 1.4%

Population by age
  - 0 to 14: 14.1%
  - 15 to 64: 59.7%
  - 65 or older: 26.2%
- Time zone: UTC+2 (EET)
  - Summer (DST): UTC+3 (EEST)
- Climate: Dfb
- Website: www.artjarvi.fi

Artjärvi (Finnish: [ˈɑrtˌjærʋi]; Swedish: Artsjö) is a former municipality of Finland. It was consolidated with the town of Orimattila on 1 January 2011.

The municipality was located in the Päijät-Häme region. It had a population of 1,412 (31 October 2010) and covered a land area of 177.01 square kilometres (68.34 sq mi). The population density was 7.98 inhabitants per square kilometre (20.7/sq mi).

The municipality was unilingually Finnish.

== History ==
The name Artjärvi originally only referred to a nearby lake. In the 15th century, Artjärvi was the center of a taxation division, when it was also known as Sääksjärvi. Artjärvi, at the time a part of the Lapinjärvi parish, became the center of a chapel community in 1636. It became independent in 1865.

Artjärvi was consolidated with Orimattila in 2011.
