= Myrskylä (village) =

Myrskylä Mörskom
- Village
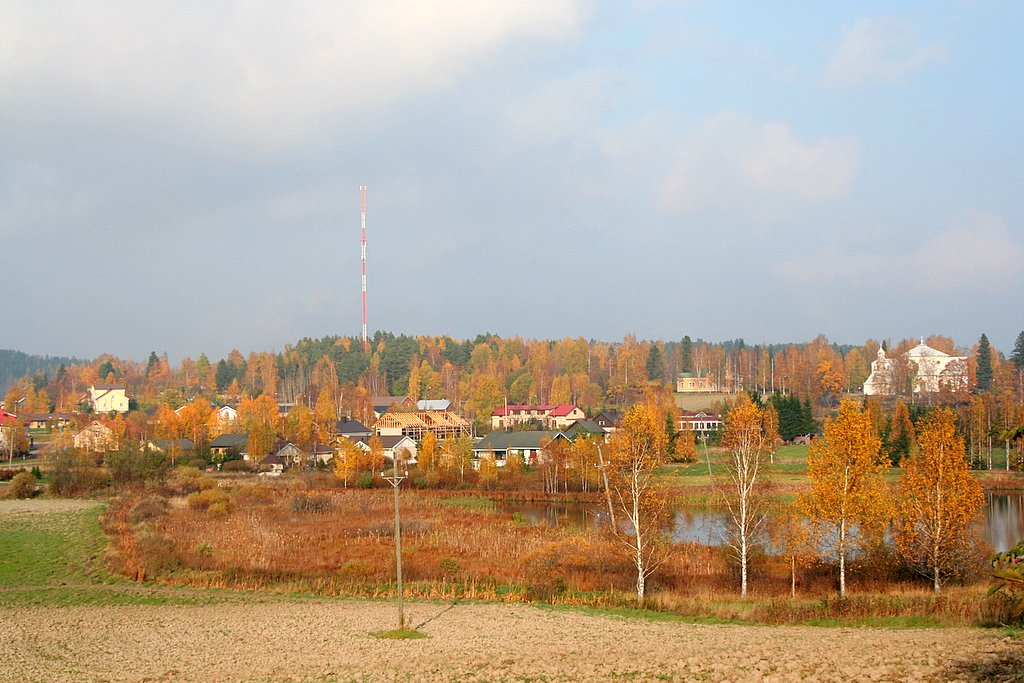
- Myrskylä church village

- Location in Finland
- Coordinates: 60°40′13″N 25°51′07″E
- Country: Finland
- Region: Uusimaa
- Municipality: Myrskylä

Population (31 December 2018)
  - Total: 908
- Time zone: UTC+2 (EET)
  - Summer (DST): UTC+3 (EEST)
- Postal code: 07600

The Myrskylä church village (also known as Myrskylä; Finnish: Myrskylän kirkonkylä, Swedish: Mörskom kyrkoby) is a village and the administrative center in the municipality by the same name in Eastern Uusimaa. It is located on the western shore of a lake called Kirkkojärvi. The center of the nearest town, Orimattila, is less than 20 kilometers to the north.

The village is home to the Myrskylä Church, which was inaugurated in 1803. The present church is the third church to have stood at the site, the first was built in 1611 and was destroyed by fire, while the second was completed in 1639 and demolished in 1800. Many other of the municipality's main services are also located in the church village, including the Sale grocery store, health center, pharmacy, library and the Osuuspankki bank. The village also has an elementary school founded in 1872.

== See also ==
- Finnish regional road 167
- Lapinjärvi (village)

== Sources ==
- Suuri Maatilakirja III (Uusimaa), kohta Myrskylä (in Finnish)
- Suomen maatalousmuseo Sarka Sarka - maatilat webissä (in Finnish)
