= Unto Ojonen =

Finnish architect (1909–1997)

- Born: August 23, 1909; Lahti, Grand Duchy of Finland
- Died: October 12, 1997 (aged 88); Lahti, Finland
- Occupation: Architect

Unto Ojonen (23 August 1909 Lahti – 12 October 1997 Lahti) was a Finnish architect. His most notable work is from the 1950s and the 1960s. Many of the buildings he designed are in Päijät-Häme, most of those in Lahti. His career lasted over 40 years. During his career he designed nearly 1000 different buildings, over 40 of those are in the city centre of Lahti.

== Notable work ==
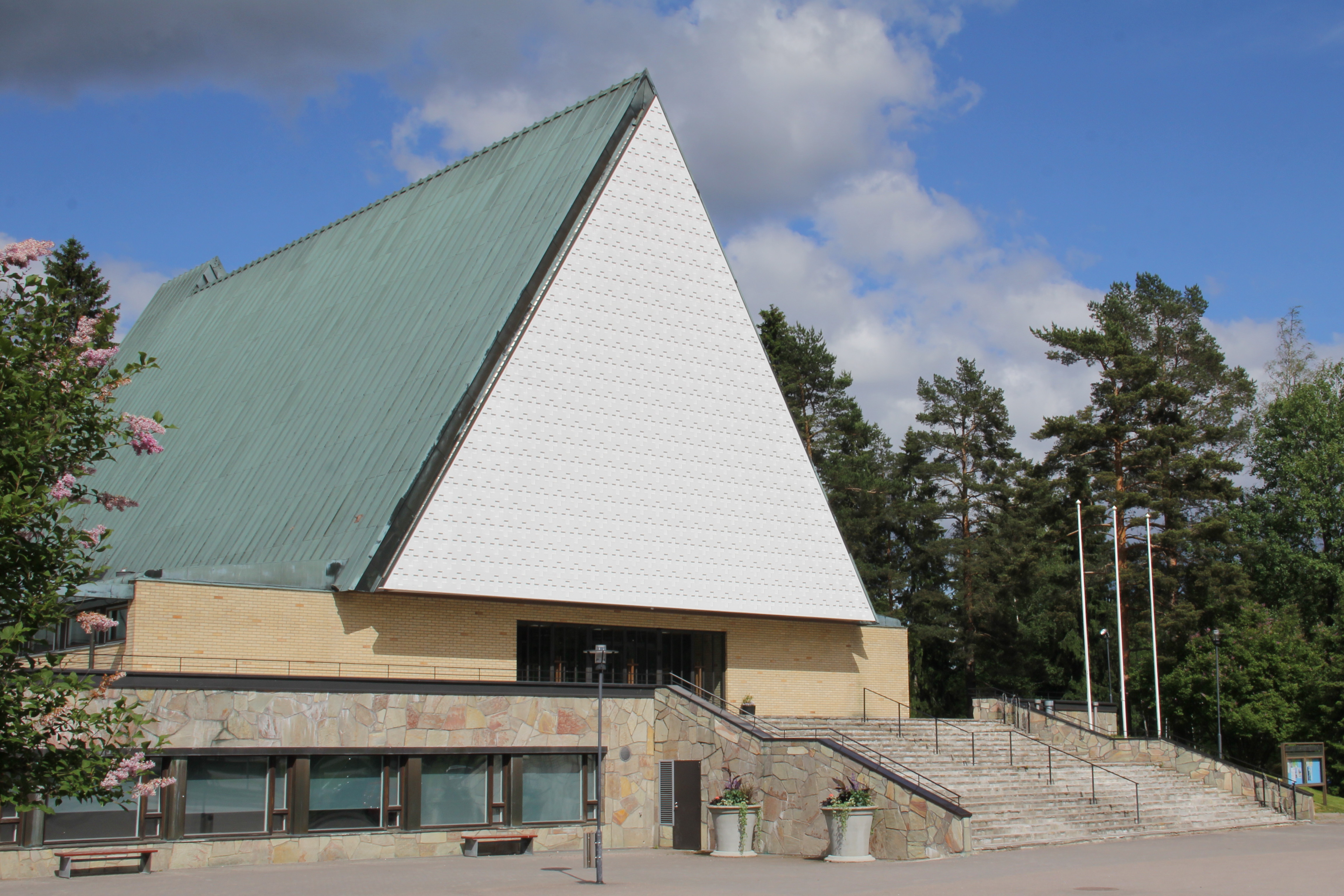
Joutjärvi church

- Iiti cemetery chapel
- Joutjärvi church
- Pääskylahti cemetery chapel
- Vuolenkoski cemetery chapel
