= Renkomäki =

- District of Lahti
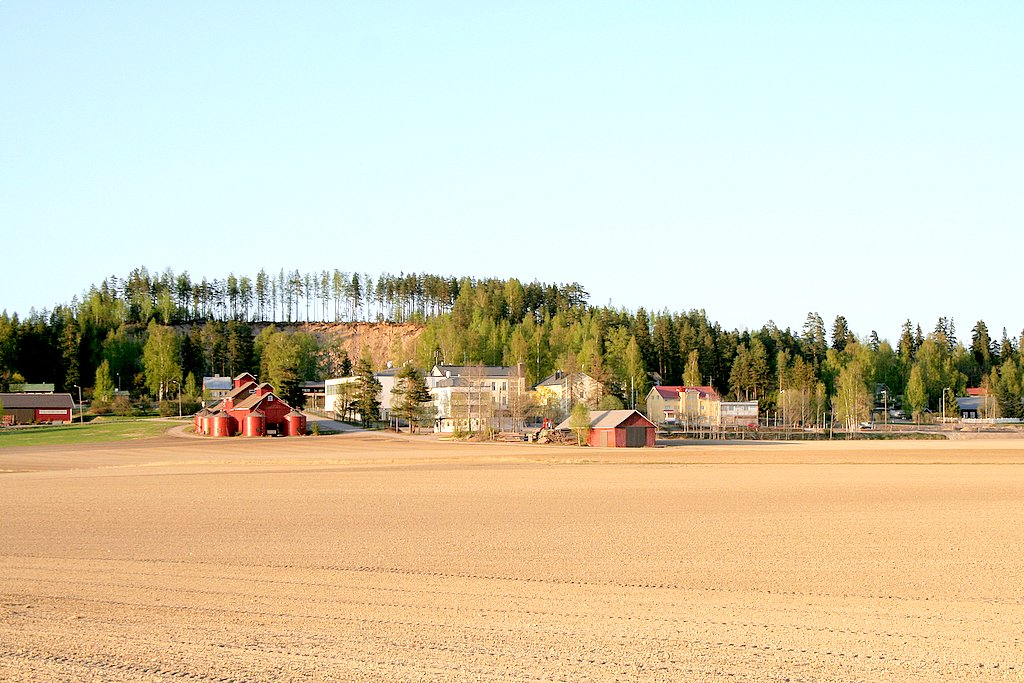
- Interactive map of Renkomäki
- Coordinates: 60°55′56″N 25°38′36″E
- Country: Finland
- Region: Päijät-Häme
- Municipality: Lahti

Population (2019)
  - Total: 2,736
- (approximate)
- Postal codes: 15680
- District number: 22

Renkomäki (Finnish: ['reŋkomæki]) is the 22nd district of the city of Lahti, in the region of Päijät-Häme, Finland. It borders the districts of Nikkilä in the north, Ämmälä in the east and Jokimaa and Laune in the northwest, as well as the town of Orimattila in the south.

By a governmental decree made on 29 October 1954, Renkomäki was annexed to Lahti from Orimattila on 1 January 1956.

The population of the statistical district of Renkomäki was 2,736 in 2019.

== See also ==
- Finnish regional road 167
- Pennala
