= Pennala =

- Village
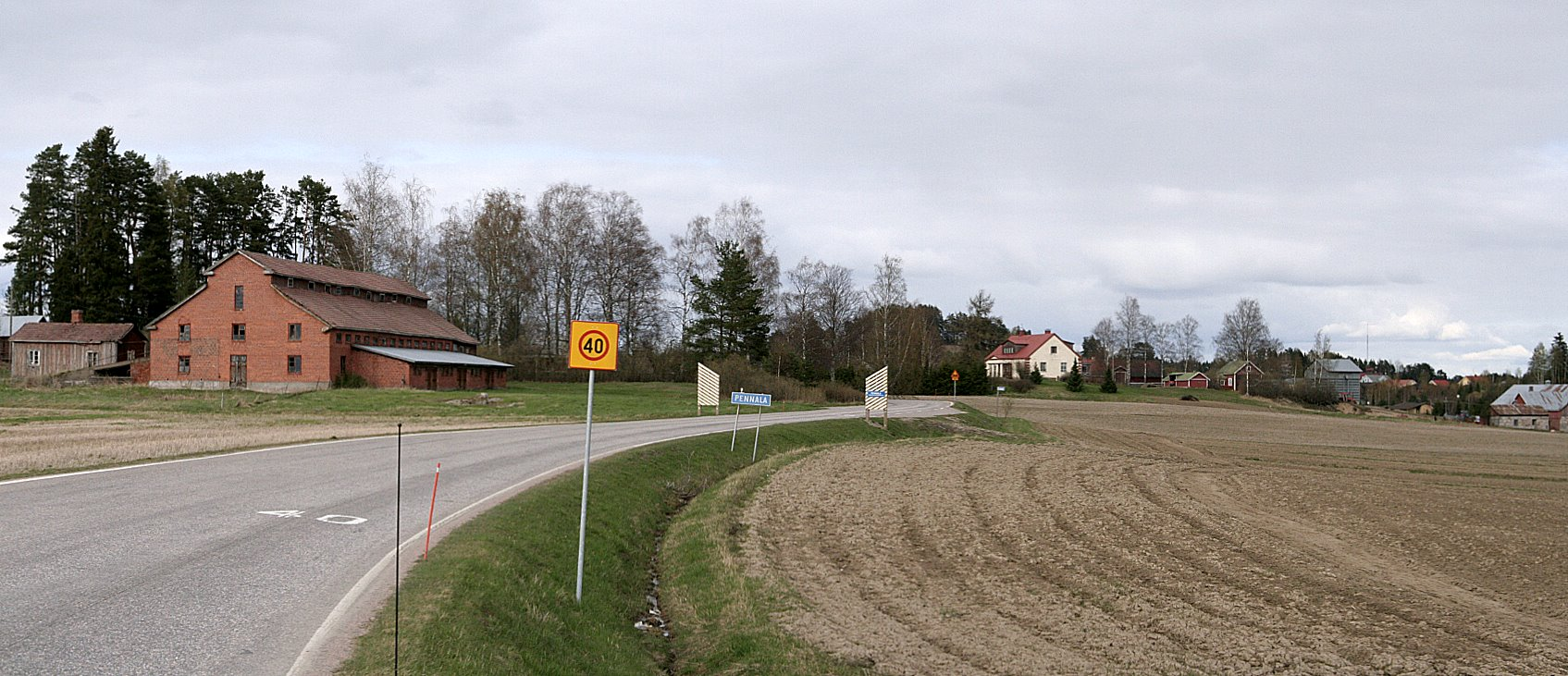
- Pennalantie (road 11845) in the Pennala village.

- Location in Finland
- Coordinates: 60°53′34.94″N 025°42′10.22″E
- Country: Finland
- Region: Päijät-Häme
- Municipality: Orimattila
- Elevation: 83 m (272 ft)

Population (31 December 2017)
  - Total: 950
- Time zone: UTC+2 (EET)
  - Summer (DST): UTC+3 (EEST)
- Postal code: 16320

Pennala (Finnish pronunciation: [ˈpenːɑlɑ]) is a village in the northern part of the Orimattila municipality in Päijät-Häme, Finland, located about 13 kilometres (8.1 mi) south of Lahti. At the end of 2017, the village had 950 inhabitants. The Lahti–Loviisa railway runs east of the village.

Pennala is believed to have been formed at the end of the 15th century, as two houses are mentioned in the land register of 1539. In 1707, there were three houses: Knaapila, Sulku and Uotila. After this, Knaapila was divided between the inheriting brothers, which formed Mattila and Peltola, the village's remaining homesteads today. According to court documents, the Pennala house, which gave the village its current name, has been located in the village since the beginning of the 18th century.

The village's services include a primary school, a kindergarten, a kiosk, and a volunteer fire department.

== See also ==
- Finnish regional road 167
- Renkomäki

== Sources ==
=== Further reading ===
- Hardén, Atte (1923). "XV ja XVI vuosisata". Orimattilan pitäjä (in Finnish). Lahti: Orimattilan kunta.
