= Joutjärvi =

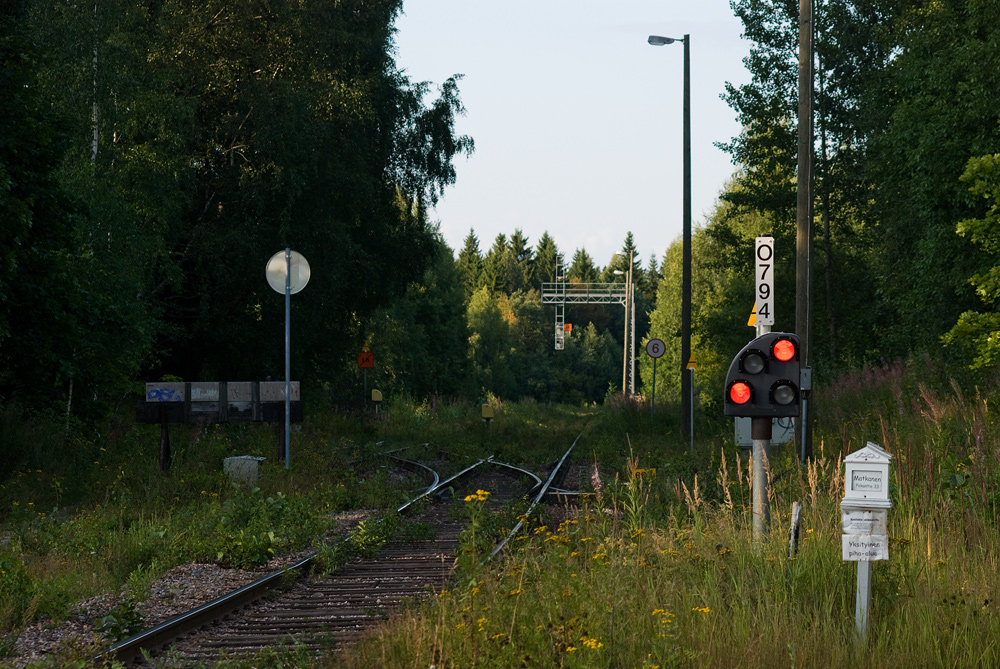
- Lahti–Heinola railway at Joutjärvi, Lahti, Finland, towards Heinola

- Location within Finland
- Coordinates: 60.8422°N 24.5874°E
- Type: natural freshwater lake
- Basin countries: Finland
- Max. length: 2.06 km (1.28 mi)
- Max. width: 0.94 km (0.58 mi)
- Surface area: 4.0 km^{2} (1.5 sq mi)
- Average depth: 3.4 m (11 ft)
- Max. depth: 5.0 m (16.4 ft)
- Islands: one - Joutsaari island
- Settlements: Lahti

Joutjärvi is a lake in the Möysä district of Lahti, Finland. Its maximum depth is 5 metres (16 ft). There is a Canoeing centre, Joutjärven melontakeskus.

== See also ==
- Joutjärvi church
