= Port of Loviisa =

- Click on the map for a fullscreen view
- Port of Loviisa (Finland)
- Native name: Loviisan satama – Lovisa hamn

Location
- Country: Finland
- Location: Loviisa
- Coordinates: 60.4125°N 26.258333°E
- UN/LOCODE: FI LOV

Details
- Operated by: Port of Loviisa Ltd
- Owned by: Port of Helsinki, City of Loviisa
- Type of harbour: coastal natural
- No. of berths: 6
- Draft depth: max. 9.5 metres (31 ft) depth

Statistics
- Annual cargo tonnage: c. 0.6m tons (int'l) (2016)
- Website portofloviisa.fi/en

The Port of Loviisa (Finnish: Loviisan satama, Swedish: Lovisa hamn) is a Baltic seaport in the city of Loviisa, located on the south coast of Finland and the northern shore of the Gulf of Finland. It is situated in the Valko district of Loviisa, and is also known as the Port of Valko.

The port specialises in forestry products and bulk cargo. A new liquid terminal for petrochemicals and biofuels is planned, and expected to be operational in 2023.

Harbour facilities include five berths and a RoRo ramp, four mobile cranes, and c. 44,000 square metres (470,000 sq ft) of warehouse space.

For ground logistics, the port is situated close to the European route E18 highway, and the port's rail depot provides the southern terminus for the Lahti–Loviisa railway.

Total international cargo throughput in 2016 was over 570,000 tons, of which approximately ¾ was exports.

The port was previously wholly owned by the City of Loviisa, until 2017 when the Port of Helsinki acquired a majority stake in it.
