= Pentti Papinaho =

Finnish sculptor (1926-1992)

Professori Pentti Papinaho
- Born: 2 June 1926; Multia, Finland
- Died: 8 March 1992 (aged 65); Orimattila, Finland
- Education: Fine Arts Academy of Finland
- Known for: Sculpture

Pentti Papinaho (2 June 1926 — 8 March 1992) was a Finnish sculptor especially known for his public works featuring military, patriotic or religious themes, active particularly in the Tavastia region of Finland.

== Education ==
Papinaho studied at art school 1947—1951, followed by further studies in sculpture at the Fine Arts Academy of Finland 1951—1951.

Later, he taught for many years at various art schools in the Lahti and Orimattila area, alongside his own creative career.

== Work ==
Papinaho's work can be seen at the same time both as representative and abstract.

Many of his works feature humans and horses, and he is renowned for his mastery of both human and equine anatomies.

In addition to large-scale sculpture, Papinaho is also known as a medal designer.

Papinaho's works are included in the collections of many art museums, including Ateneum (Finnish National Gallery) in Helsinki, and the Hermitage Museum of St Petersburg.

=== Selected works ===
- 1963: Joutjärvi church altar piece Golgata ('Calvary') and exterior relief Kymmenen neitsyttä ('Ten Virgins')
- 1966: Vesieste ('Water Hurdle'), Tampere Stadium fountain sculpture
- 1974: Hakkapeliittain kotiinpaluu, memorial to the Hakkapeliittas, Lahti
- 1988: Suojeluskuntalainen statue and related relief, Seinäjoki Civil Guard House

(Images of many of Papinaho's works can be seen on the Finnish wiki page.)

== Honours and awards ==
In 1976, Papinaho was awarded the Pro Finlandia medal of the Order of the Lion of Finland, as well as the Pro Arte medal.

In 1982, the honorary title of Professori was conferred on Papinaho by the President of Finland.

He also received multiple awards in sculpture contests.

== Personal life ==
Pentti Papinaho was born to Jalmari Papinaho and Annikki née Mannisenmäki.

He was married to Annikki née Kottila. The couple had four children.

In 1986, to mark his 60th birthday, Papinaho established a charitable foundation in his name, supporting fine arts in the Päijät-Häme region.

Papinaho died of a sudden attack of illness at the relatively young age of 65. He was in the middle of a productive artistic period, and left behind several unfinished works.
