= Seinäjoki Civil Guard House =

Public building in Finland

- Seinäjoen Suojeluskuntatalo; Sydösterbottens skyddskårshus
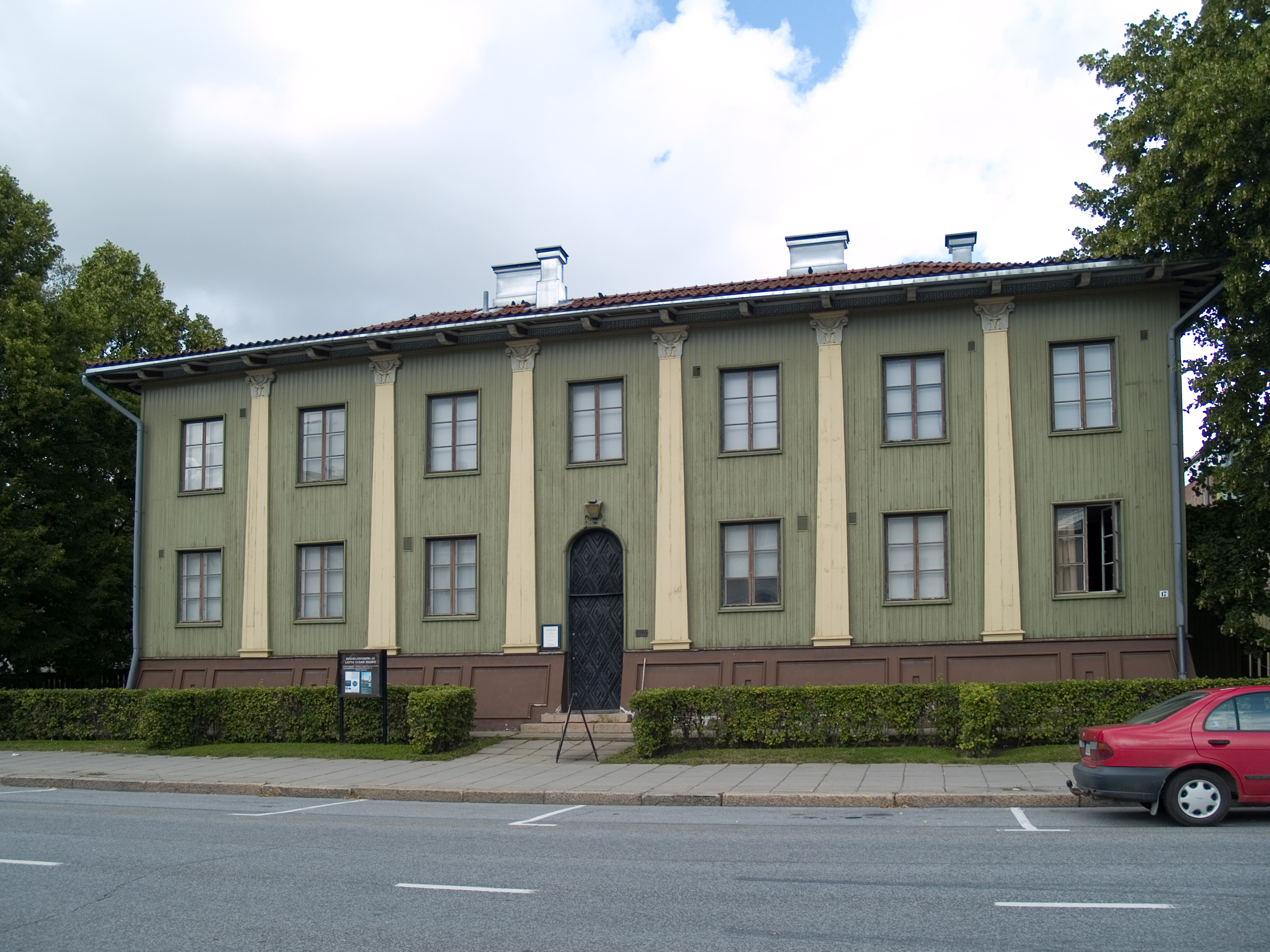
- Seinäjoki Civil Guard House pictured in 2012
- Interactive map of the Seinäjoki Civil Guard House area
- Alternative names: Seinäjoki Defence Corps Building, Seinäjoki White Guard House

General information
- Type: Public
- Architectural style: Nordic Classicism
- Location: Seinäjoki, Finland, Kauppakatu 17; 60100 Seinäjoki
- Coordinates: 62.788977°N 22.837313°E
- Current tenants: Suojeluskunta & Lotta Svärd Museum
- Completed: 1926
- Owner: City of Seinäjoki

Technical details
- Structural system: Masonry, timber

Design and construction
- Architect: Alvar Aalto

The Seinäjoki Civil Guard House (Finnish: Seinäjoen Suojeluskuntatalo; Swedish: Sydösterbottens skyddskårshus) is a building located in Seinäjoki, Finland. It is notable for being one of the first public buildings designed entirely by the Finnish architect Alvar Aalto, and is considered one of his breakthrough works.

== Background and use ==
The building was designed by Aalto in 1924–1926, to serve as the headquarters of the South Ostrobothnia division of the Finnish Civil Guard (aka. White Guard, or Defence Corps) voluntary militia and the related Lotta Svärd women's auxiliary organisation.

After the end of World War II (or Continuation War, in the Finnish context), the Civil Guard and Lotta Svärd organisations were disbanded as stipulated in the peace treaty with the Soviet Union, and the building was leased to a youth cultural organisation (Nuorisoseuraliike), with other tenants over time including a school.

Since 1990, the building has been home to the Suojeluskunta & Lotta Svärd Museum, as part of the City of Seinäjoki museum network.

== Design ==
The design, in the Nordic classical style, is considered one of the main works from Aalto's earlier neoclassical period, predating the modernist style for which he is more widely known.

The main interior features were also designed by Aalto, and are stylistically in similar vein; per Alvar Aalto Foundation,

The unusual stair hall, facade pilasters, and assembly hall [are] painted in Pompeiian style. [...] Aalto originally designed a loggia-like staircase for the end entrance, but it was not built.

The building complex consists of three buildings and a courtyard enclosed by them. The main building comprises three storeys, and is of masonry (ground floor) and timber (first and second floors) construction. The ground floor is partly subterranean, and houses a circular assembly hall. The top floor was originally intended for residential use, with further accommodation found in one of the separate buildings.

The courtyard was originally intended for parade and foot drill use, and now houses the 1988 statue Suojeluskuntalainen and related relief by Finnish sculptor, Professor Pentti Papinaho.

In 2002, the building complex was designated and protected by the Finnish Heritage Agency as a nationally important built cultural environment (Valtakunnallisesti merkittävä rakennettu kulttuuriympäristö).

== See also ==
- Aalto Centre, Seinäjoki
- White Guard (Finland)
