= Finnish cities =

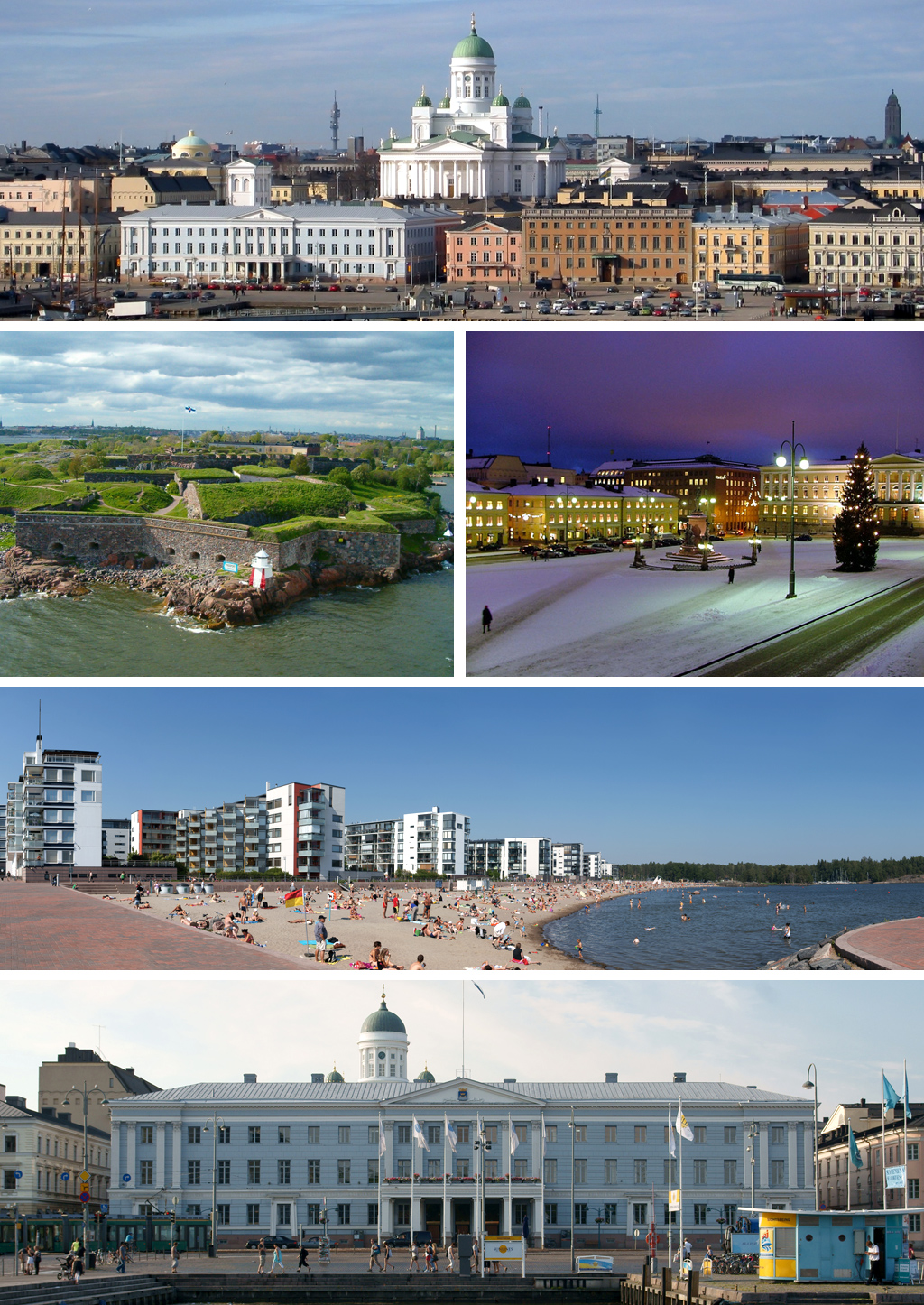
Helsinki is the capital city of Finland and by far the country's most populous municipality.

In Finland, cities refers to municipalities using the name of a city or of an urban area.

Historically, cities have been distinguished from rural areas on the basis of local autonomy and different legislation, with the Civil Code of 1734 being the first legislation to apply to all settlements and people. Nowadays cities and municipalities do not have judicial differences or any judicial powers. In the past, the country's ruler made the decisions on the founding of the city, but nowadays the municipalities can declare themselves as cities.

Extensive rural areas are also located in the area of many municipal districts. On the other hand, some urban areas in rural districts can be bigger in terms of population than the actual administrative centre. In the case of many cities, the population will continue over the city boundaries.

Geographical area classification of Finnish cities can also mean the difference between urban and rural areas. In such a categorization, city or municipal area does not follow the municipal boundaries, rather it is based on a categorization method.

== See also ==
- List of cities and towns in Finland
