= Laune =

- District of Lahti
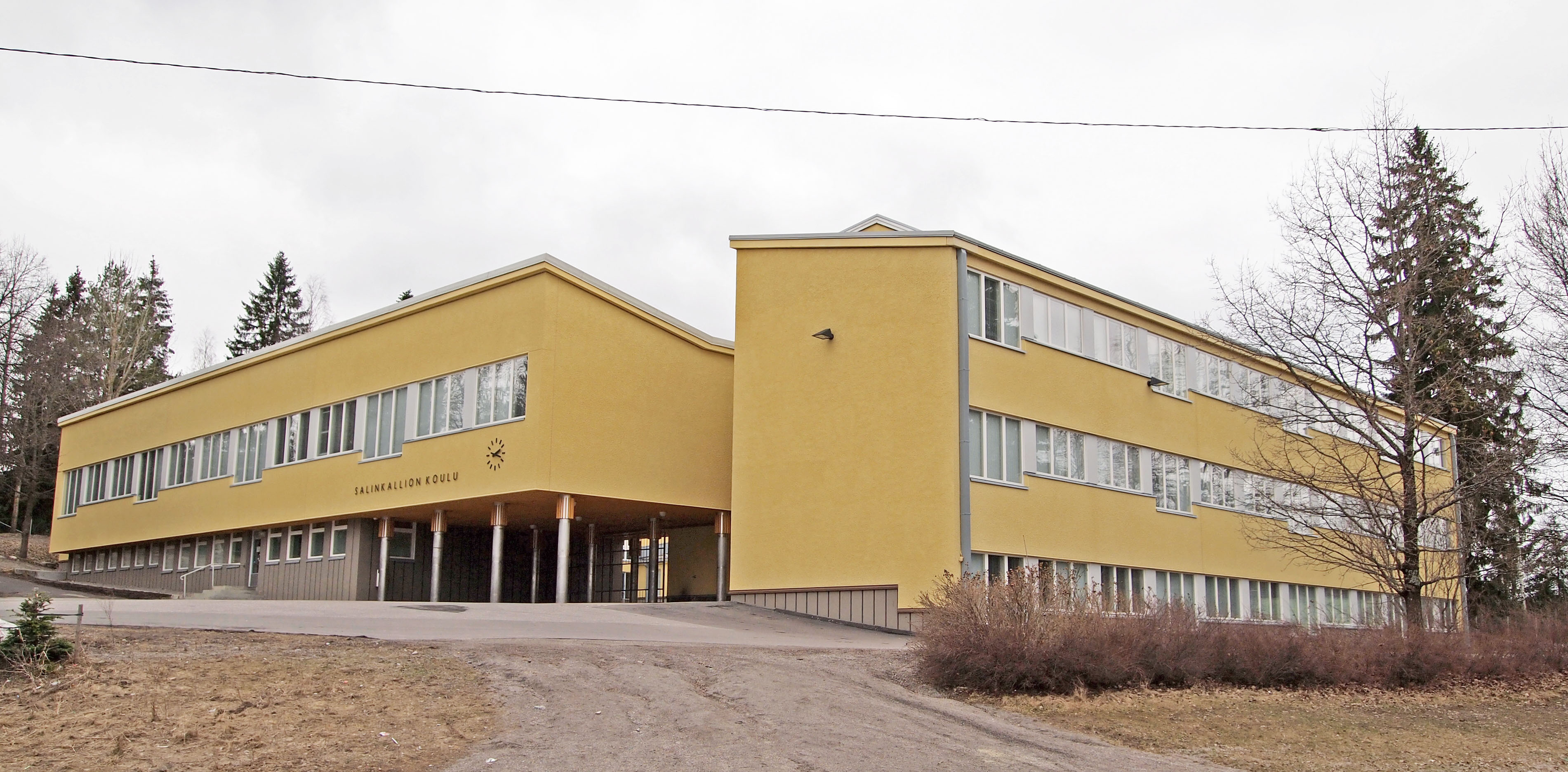
- Salinkallio school in Laune
- Interactive map of Laune
- Coordinates: 60°57′18″N 25°38′9″E
- Country: Finland
- Region: Päijät-Häme
- Municipality: Lahti

Population (2019)
  - Total: 6,201
- (approximate)
- Postal codes: 15610
- District number: 24

Laune (Finnish: ['lɑu̯ne]) is the 24th district of the city of Lahti, in the region of Päijät-Häme, Finland. It borders the districts of Asemantausta in the north, Kerinkallio and Nikkilä in the east, Renkomäki in the southeast, Jokimaa in the southwest and Hennala in the west.

The population of the statistical district of Laune was 6,201 in 2019.
