= Myrskylä =

Myrskylä Myrskylä – Mörskom
- Municipality
- Myrskylän kunta Mörskoms kommun
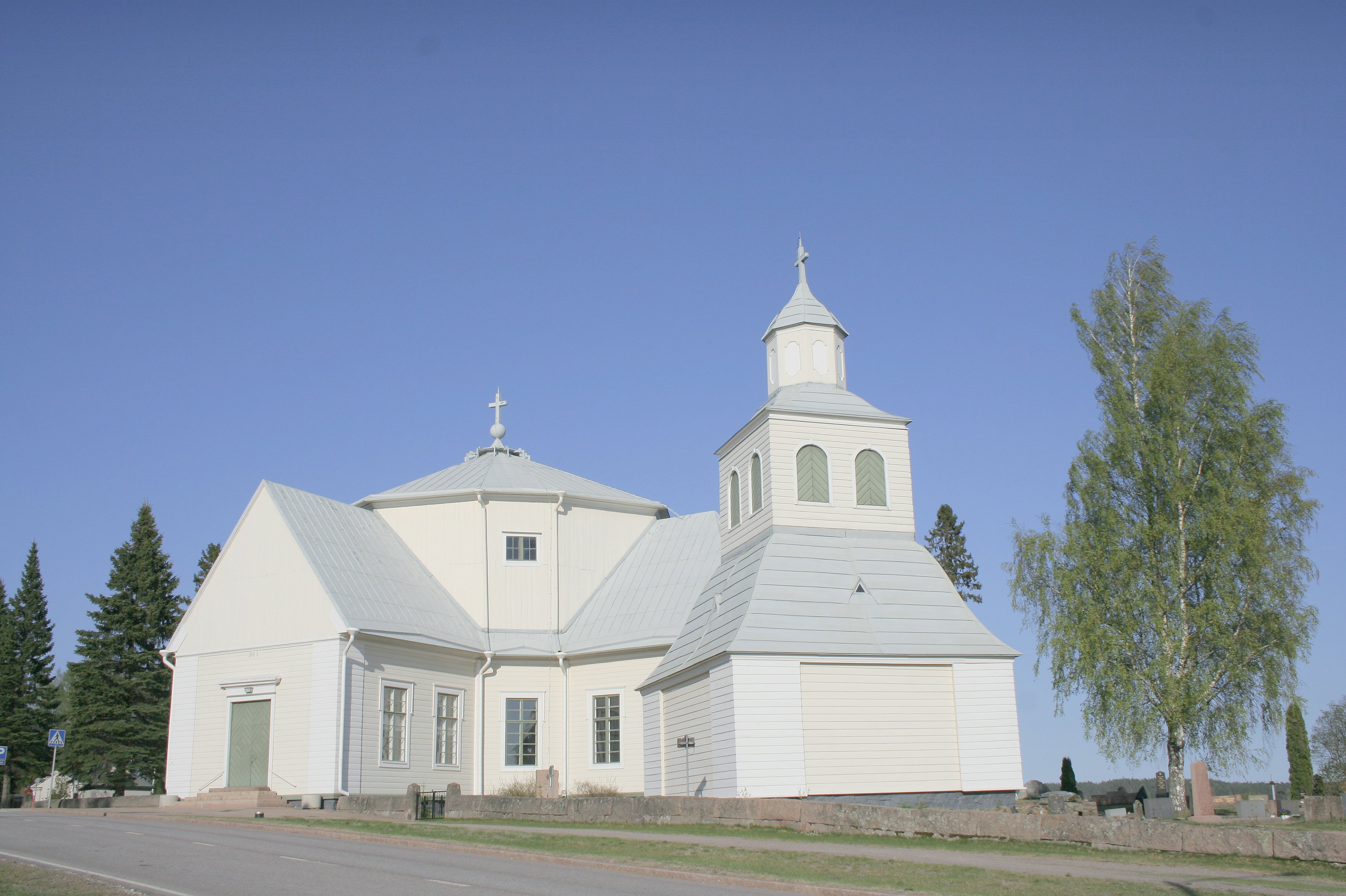
- Myrskylä Church

- Coat of arms

- Location of Myrskylä in Finland
- Interactive map of Myrskylä
- Coordinates: 60°40′N 025°51′E
- Country: Finland
- Region: Uusimaa
- Sub-region: Porvoo
- Charter: 1636
- Seat: Myrskylä (Kirkonkylä)

Government
  - Municipality manager: Esa Ukkola

Area (2018-01-01)
  - Total: 206.35 km^{2} (79.67 sq mi)
  - Land: 200.44 km^{2} (77.39 sq mi)
  - Water: 5.98 km^{2} (2.31 sq mi)
  - Rank: 262nd largest in Finland

Population (2025-12-31)
  - Total: 1,692
  - Rank: 272nd largest in Finland
  - Density: 8.44/km^{2} (21.9/sq mi)

Population by native language
  - Finnish: 86.7% (official)
  - Swedish: 9.2% (official)
  - Others: 4.1%

Population by age
  - 0 to 14: 15.6%
  - 15 to 64: 55%
  - 65 or older: 29.4%
- Time zone: UTC+02:00 (EET)
  - Summer (DST): UTC+03:00 (EEST)
- Climate: Dfb
- Website: myrskyla.fi

Myrskylä (Finnish pronunciation: [ˈmyrskylæ]; Swedish: Mörskom) is a municipality in Finland, located in the southern interior of the country. Myrskylä is situated in the eastern part of the Uusimaa region, and it is the smallest municipality in the region in relation to its population. The population of Myrskylä is approximately 2,000, while the sub-region has a population of approximately 60,000. It is the 272nd most populous municipality in Finland.

Myrskylä covers an area of 206.35 square kilometres (79.67 sq mi) of which 5.98 km^{2} (2.31 sq mi) is water. The population density is 8.44 inhabitants per square kilometre (21.9/sq mi). Neighbouring municipalities are Askola, Porvoo, Pukkila, Orimattila, Lapinjärvi and Loviisa.

Myrskylä is a bilingual municipality with Finnish and Swedish as its official languages. The population consists of 87% Finnish speakers, 9% Swedish speakers, and 4% speakers of other languages.

The Myrskylä parish was founded in 1636 when it was separated from Pernå by Isaacus Rothovius, the Bishop of Turku, and confirmed by Christina, the Queen of Sweden.

== Geography ==
There are many lakes connected to the Myrskylänjoki watershed. These lakes are Pöyrysjärvi, Isojärvi, Vähäjärvi, Muttilanjärvi, Siippo, Sopajärvi, Kirkkojärvi and Sulkavanjärvi.

=== Villages ===
Hallila, Hyövinkylä, Jaakkola, Kankkila, Myrskylä (Kirkonkylä), Pakila and Kreivilä.

== History ==
The area was originally a part of the Pernå parish and has had both Finnish and Swedish inhabitants since the medieval times. The village of Hallila (under its Swedish name Skomarböle) was first mentioned in 1403 while Myrskylä itself was first mentioned in 1485. The name of Myrskylä comes from the Finnish word myrsky meaning "storm", likely via a farm name.

Myrskylä acquired its first church in 1604 or 1611, eventually becoming its own parish in 1636. The parish was an annex of the bishop of Porvoo from 1747 to 1865.

== Demographics ==
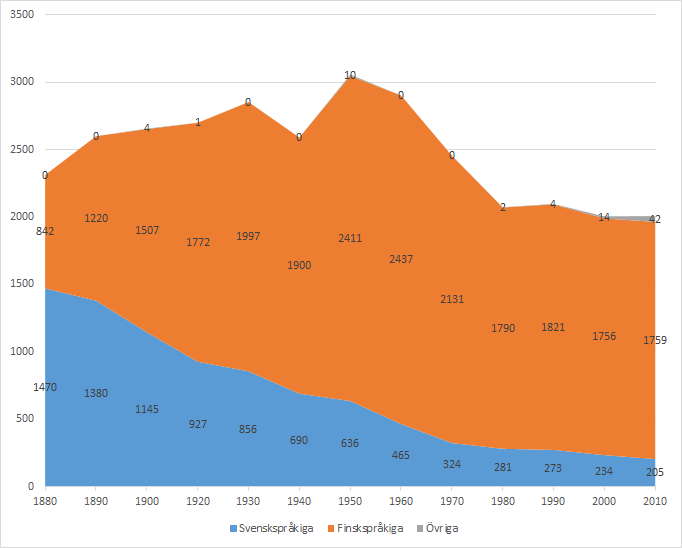
Demo-linguistic evolution in Myrskylä municipality in the period 1880–2010. In orange: Number of Finnish speakers. In blue: Number Swedish speakers. In grey: Number of people with another native language.

Historical census populations – Myrskylä

Year	Pop.	±%
1980	2,073	—
1981	2,047	−1.3%
1982	2,005	−2.1%
1983	1,994	−0.5%
1984	2,026	+1.6%
1985	1,998	−1.4%
1986	1,985	−0.7%
1987	1,979	−0.3%
1988	2,014	+1.8%
1989	2,051	+1.8%
1990	2,098	+2.3%

Year	Pop.	±%
1991	2,066	−1.5%
1992	2,065	−0.0%
1993	2,054	−0.5%
1994	2,051	−0.1%
1995	2,040	−0.5%
1996	2,021	−0.9%
1997	2,011	−0.5%
1998	2,022	+0.5%
1999	2,036	+0.7%
2000	2,044	+0.4%
2001	1,974	−3.4%

Year	Pop.	±%
2002	1,992	+0.9%
2003	2,012	+1.0%
2004	2,036	+1.2%
2005	2,033	−0.1%
2006	2,050	+0.8%
2007	2,026	−1.2%
2008	2,010	−0.8%
2009	2,021	+0.5%
2010	2,006	−0.7%
2011	2,008	+0.1%

Myrskylä is the birthplace of former Olympic track champion Lasse Virén. The educational department takes part in Lifelong Learning Programme 2007–2013 in Finland.

== Politics ==
Results of the 2011 Finnish parliamentary election in Myrskylä:

- True Finns 27.1%
- Centre Party 22.0%
- National Coalition Party 15.7%
- Social Democratic Party 12.6%
- Swedish People's Party 10.0%
- Green League 4.6%
- Christian Democrats 3.7%
- Left Alliance 2.8%
