= Hennala =

- District of Lahti
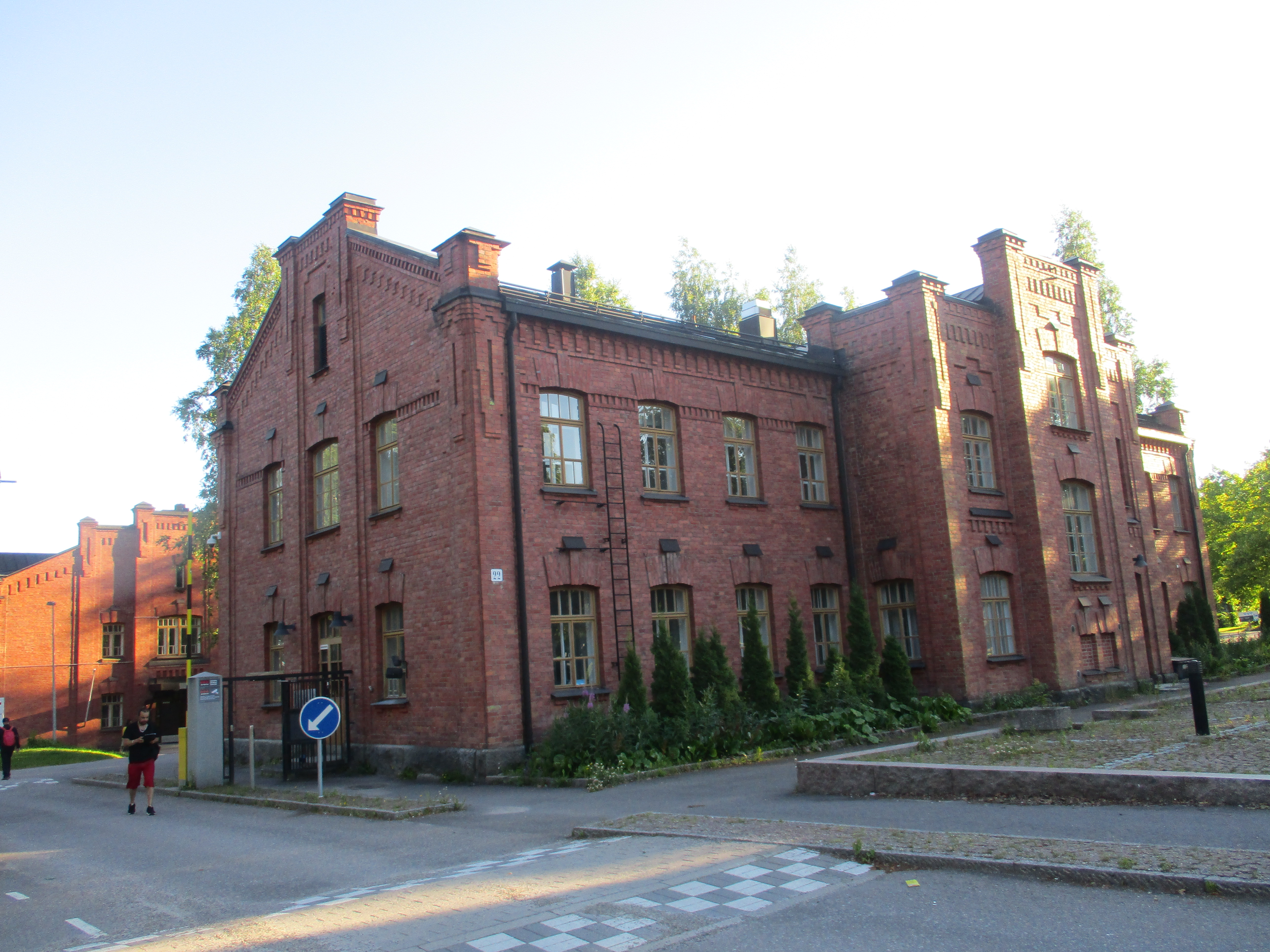
- Buildings of the Hennala Garrison
- Interactive map of Hennala
- Country: Finland
- Region: Päijät-Häme
- Municipality: Lahti

Population (2019)
  - Total: 2,363
- (approximate)
- Postal codes: 15700
- District number: 27
- Neighbouring districts: Keski-Lahti; Laune; Asemantausta; Sopenkorpi; Jokimaa; Okeroinen; Kärpänen

Hennala (Finnish: ['henːɑlɑ]) is a district in the city of Lahti, Finland. It is known of the Stora Enso packaging factory and the former Hennala Garrison which also worked as a concentration camp after the 1918 Finnish Civil War.

Together with the garrisons in Riihimäki, Dragsvik and Hämeenlinna, Hennala is one of the best preserved examples of the Russian military architecture in Finland. It is listed as one of the Cultural environments of national significance by the Finnish National Board of Antiquities.

The combined population of the statistical areas of Hennala and Tornator, corresponding to the area of the district of Hennala, was 2,363 in 2019.

== History ==
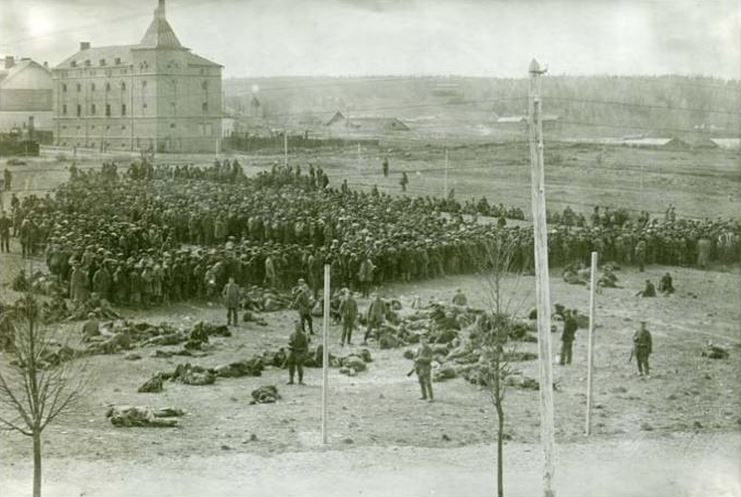
Hennala Prison Camp in 1918

The Hennala Garrison was completed in 1911–1913 when Finland was an autonomous part of the Russian Empire. As the Russian Army left Finland in early 1918 and the Finnish Civil War broke out, the garrison was occupied by the Red Guards. After the Battle of Lahti, Hennala was turned into a prison camp. Hennala camp was one of the most infamous camps the Whites established after the war. In few months, at least 1,100 of the 11,000 Red detainees died of executions, disease and malnutrition before the camp was closed in 1919. In 1920–2014 the garrison housed the Häme Regiment and 1940–1994 the Central Military Hospital No 2.

During the 2015 European migrant crisis Hennala was turned into an immigrant reception center. In September, Hennala became the center of international attention after local anti-immigration activists threw stones and fireworks at the asylum seekers and Red Cross workers. One of the demonstrators was wearing a Ku Klux Klan outfit.

== Services ==
Two Lahti Region Transport bus lines run through Hennala: line 2 between Viuha and Metsä-Pietilä in Okeroinen, and line 12 between Ala-Okeroinen and the Market Square via Rykmentinkatu and Metsä-Hennala.
