= Liljendal =

- Former municipality
- Liljendal kommun Liljendalin kunta
- Coat of arms

- Location of Liljendal in Finland
- Coordinates: 60°34.5′N 026°03.5′E
- Country: Finland
- Region: Eastern Uusimaa
- Sub-region: Loviisa sub-region
- Charter: 1914
- Consolidated: 2010

Government
  - Municipal manager: Sten Frondén

Area
  - Total: 119.64 km^{2} (46.19 sq mi)
  - Land: 113.67 km^{2} (43.89 sq mi)
  - Water: 5.97 km^{2} (2.31 sq mi)

Population (2009-12-31)
  - Total: 1,472
  - Density: 12.95/km^{2} (33.54/sq mi)

Population by native language
  - Finnish: 23.8% (official)
  - Swedish: 74.9% (official)
  - Others: 1.3%
- Time zone: UTC+2 (EET)
  - Summer (DST): UTC+3 (EEST)
- Climate: Dfb
- Website: www.liljendal.fi

Liljendal is a former municipality of Finland.

It is located in the province of Southern Finland and was part of the Eastern Uusimaa region. The municipality had a population of 1,472 (31 December 2009) and covered an area of 119.64 square kilometres (46.19 sq mi) of which 5.97 km^{2} (2.31 sq mi) is water. The population density was 12.95 inhabitants per square kilometre (33.5/sq mi).

The municipality was bilingual, with majority (74.9%) being Swedish and minority (23.8%) Finnish speakers. The municipality has previously also been known as Liljentaali in Finnish documents.

Liljendal was consolidated to Loviisa, together with Pernå and Ruotsinpyhtää, on January 1, 2010.

== History ==
Liljendal was originally the name of a seat farm (säteri) in the village of Sävträsk. Its name may have been derived from that of an old Cistercian monastery in Lower Saxony, Lilienthal. At the time, it was a part of the Pernå (Pernaja) parish. The name got its current meaning when the seat farm and nine villages near it became their own chapel community in 1791. Liljendal became a separate parish in 1914.
