= Kujala =

Kujala is a Finnish surname. Notable people with the surname include:

- Toivo Kujala (1894–1959), Finnish electrician and politician
- Urho Kujala (born 1957), Finnish orienteering competitor
- Jussi Kujala (footballer) (born 1983), Finnish football player
- Patrick Kujala (born 1996), Spanish-born professional racing driver
