= Pernå =

Pernå Pernå – Pernaja
- Former municipality
- Pernå kommun Pernajan kunta
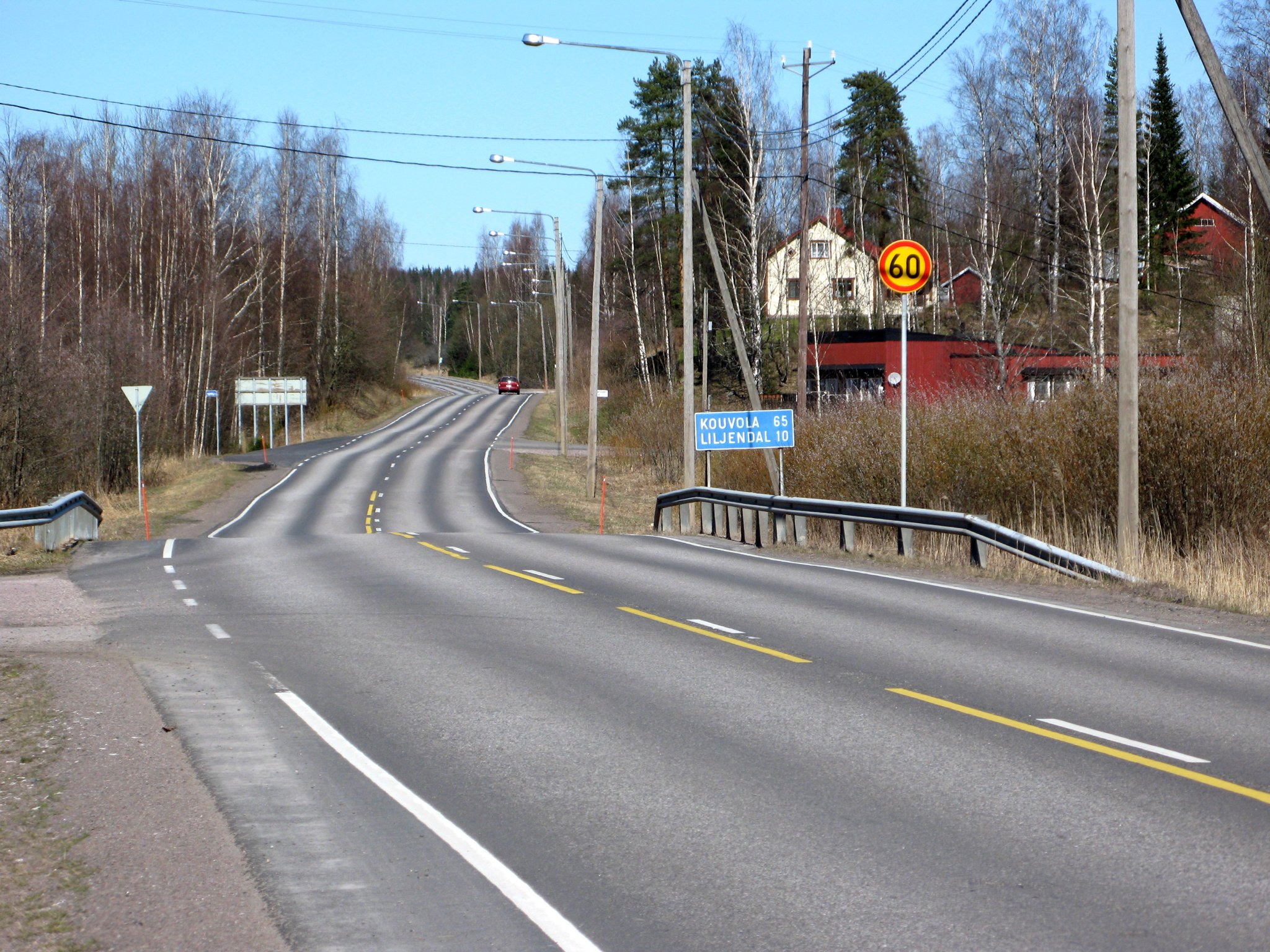

- Coat of arms

- Location of Pernå in Finland
- Coordinates: 60°27′N 026°02′E
- Country: Finland
- Region: Eastern Uusimaa
- Sub-region: Loviisa sub-region
- Consolidated: 2010

Government
  - Municipal manager: Ralf Sjödahl

Area
  - Total: 1,107.07 km^{2} (427.44 sq mi)
  - Land: 419.47 km^{2} (161.96 sq mi)
  - Water: 687.6 km^{2} (265.5 sq mi)

Population (2009-12-31)
  - Total: 3,961
  - Density: 9.443/km^{2} (24.46/sq mi)
- Time zone: UTC+2 (EET)
  - Summer (DST): UTC+3 (EEST)
- Climate: Dfb
- Website: www.pernaja.fi

Pernå (Finland Swedish: [ˈpæːrno], Sweden Swedish: [ˈpæ̌ːɳɔ]; Finnish: Pernaja) is a former municipality of Finland.

Pernå is located in the province of Southern Finland and was part of the Eastern Uusimaa region. The municipality had a population of 3,961 (31 December 2009) and covered an area of 1,107.07 square kilometres (427.44 sq mi) of which 687.6 km^{2} (265.5 sq mi) is water. The population density was 9.44 inhabitants per square kilometre (24.4/sq mi).

The municipality was bilingual, with the majority being Swedish and minority Finnish speakers.

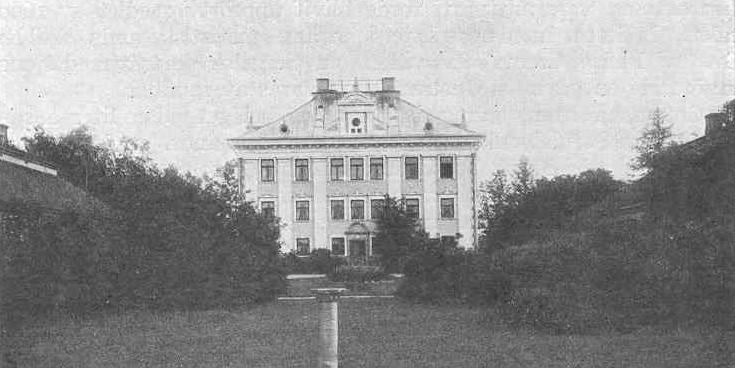
Sarvlaks manor house, 1672-1683, Lorentz Creutz

Pernå is the oldest parish in the Eastern Uusimaa region. The current municipalities of Lapinjärvi, Liljendal and Loviisa were originally part of it. Mikael Agricola, the founder of written Finnish was born in Pernå in the early 16th century. He is also considered to be the "Reformator of Finland" in the transfer from Catholicism to Lutheranism.

Situated conveniently by the coast, and engulfing also a small river, the lands of Pernå were attractive at a time when waterways rather than proper roads provided the means of transport. There are a number of manor houses in the Pernå area - most notably Sarvlaks manor, which dates back to the 1450s - at a time when Finland was a part of Sweden.

The origin of the name "Pernå" is uncertain; some think it links with the Uralic word "Pern" meaning lime- or lindentree. "Å" is Swedish for a small river, i.e. the name then being Lindenriver if translated.

On 1 January 2010 Pernå was amalgamated with Loviisa, Ruotsinpyhtää and Liljendal to form a new municipality of Loviisa.

== People born in Pernå ==
- Mikael Agricola (1510 – 1557)
- Axel Rudolf Danielson ( 21 March 1888 Pernå - 17 October 1938 ) was a Finnish 27th Jaeger Battalion Major and pharmacist. His parents were
- Karl Gustaf Danielson ( 2 December 1856 Pernå - 7 August 1924 ), a gardener and Naval Officer, and Emilia Sofia Johansson (10 August 1864 - 10 January 1939). His wife, Anna Maria Arlander, was a Senior nurse.
- Oscar Johansson (1882 – 1947)
- Ernst von Born (1885 – 1956)
- Ola Rosendahl (1939 – 2008)
