= Orimattila =

- City
- Orimattilan kaupunki Orimattila stad
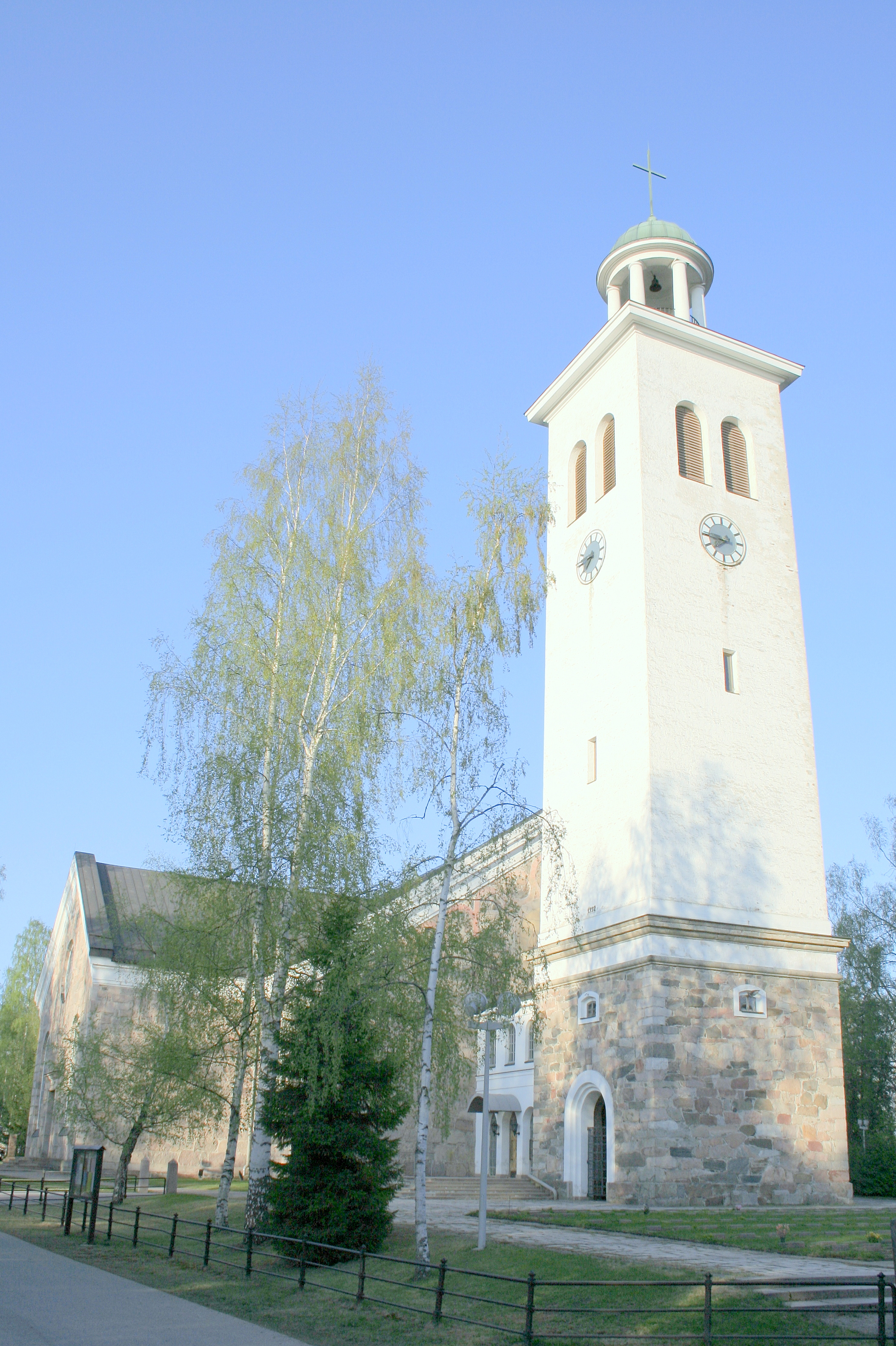
- Orimattila Church

- Coat of arms

- Location of Orimattila in Finland
- Interactive map of Orimattila
- Location within Finland
- Country: Finland
- Region: Päijät-Häme
- Sub-region: Lahti
- Charter: 1636
- City rights: 1992

Government
  - Town manager: Osmo Pieski

Area (2018-01-01)
  - Total: 814.01 km^{2} (314.29 sq mi)
  - Land: 785.26 km^{2} (303.19 sq mi)
  - Water: 28.87 km^{2} (11.15 sq mi)
  - Rank: 105th largest in Finland

Population (2025-12-31)
  - Total: 15,575
  - Rank: 70th largest in Finland
  - Density: 19.83/km^{2} (51.4/sq mi)

Population by native language
  - Finnish: 94.3% (official)
  - Swedish: 0.6%
  - Others: 5%

Population by age
  - 0 to 14: 16.4%
  - 15 to 64: 58%
  - 65 or older: 25.6%
- Time zone: UTC+02:00 (EET)
  - Summer (DST): UTC+03:00 (EEST)
- Climate: Dfc
- Website: orimattila.fi

Orimattila (Finnish pronunciation: [ˈoriˌmɑtːilɑ]) is a city in Päijät-Häme region, Finland. The southern part of Lahti is connected to the village of Pennala, which is located in the northern part of the Orimattila municipality. Its neighboring municipalities are Hollola, Iitti, Kärkölä, Lahti, Lapinjärvi, Mäntsälä, Myrskylä and Pukkila.

Orimattila has a population of 15,575 (31 December 2025), and it covers an area of 814.01 square kilometers of which 28.87 square kilometers is water. The municipality is also unilingually Finnish. Its per-capita population is around 20.14.

The subject of the coat of arms of Orimattila, "a stallion horse carrying a scythe", refers to both the name of the municipality and local agriculture. The name itself comes from a house called Orhimattila, hosted by Henrich Mattzsson Orhimattila, which was already written in a 1573 book of judgment. The coat of arms was designed by Ahti Hammar and approved by the Orimattila Municipal Council at its meeting on 15 September 1956. The Ministry of the Interior approved the use of the coat of arms on 17 December of the same year.

Results of the 2021 Finnish municipal elections, resulted in the True Finns being the largest group on Orimattila council, in Orimattila.

== History ==
The area of Orimattila contains Finland's oldest known settlement.

Orimattila gets its name from a local farm, established by Matti Laurinpoika in 1539. His estate was known as Orih-Mattila. As a village, Orimattila was first mentioned in 1561 as Orihmattila. A chapel community was established in the late 1500s, and it became an independent parish after it was separated from the neighboring parish of Hollola in 1636. The parish and its main settlement were still known as Orihmattila until the 19th century. Orih is an older pronunciation of the word ori meaning "stallion", though the loss of the h in place names was prevented by the element after it, in this case -mattila (cf. Orivesi, also called Orihvesi until the 19th century).

During the Great Northern War, which was caused by the Russian occupation of Finland, the parishes of Orimattila and Hollola were temporarily united. The following year, the bishop of Orimattila was forced to collect taxes from the neighboring parish of Hollola, which was then taken over by the bishop of Stockholm.

On 1 January 1956, the city of Lahti annexed the district of Renkomäki, which previously belonged to Orimattila.

Many immigrants from the Kirvu region were settled in Orimattila as a result of the Continuation War. Orimattila became a city in 1992. In 2009, the municipality decided not to participate in the merger negotiations between the municipalities of Artjärvi and Orimattila, and on 22 March 2010, the two municipalities merged.

== Population trends ==
The following diagram shows the city's population development over the past five years. The region where the city is located is used according to the situation on 1 January 2017.

Orimattilas population trends
Year	Residents
1980	15,184
1985	15,246
1990	15,805
1995	15,909
2000	15,629
2005	16,154
2010	16,309
2015	16,326
2020	16,005

== Famous people ==
Culture

- Kaj Chydenius, a composer, is staying in the village
- Eero Erkko, Member of Parliament 1907–1918, newspaperman
- Aki Kaurismäki, film director
- Mika Kaurismäki, film director
- Pentti Papinaho, sculptor

Athletes

- Taito Haara, power and weight lifter
- Kristiina Mäkelä, triple jumper
- Satu Mäkelä-Nummela, Olympic shooting gold medalist (women's trap)
- Huvi Tuiskunen, sport shooter
- Jaakko Tuominen, hurdler

== Twin towns — Sister cities ==
Orimattila is twinned with:

- Weißenburg-Gunzenhausen, Germany
- Östhammar, Sweden
- Jõgeva, Estonia
- Valka, Latvia

== See also ==
- Artjärvi
- Myrskylä
- Pukkila
- Renkomäki
