= Capital punishment in Finland =

Europe holds the greatest concentration of abolitionist states (blue). Map current as of 2022 Abolished for all offences Abolished in practice Retains capital punishment

Capital punishment in Finland (Finnish: kuolemanrangaistus, Swedish: dödsstraff) has been abolished de jure.

== During the Grand Duchy ==
As of 1823 in the Grand Duchy of Finland, death sentences were commuted to transportation to Siberia or other lesser sentences. The last person to be executed in peacetime was farmhand Tahvo Putkonen, on 8 July 1825, for murder. Capital punishment was de facto abolished during the rest of the Czarist regime 1825–1917 in Finland and commuted into exile in Siberia.

== From the Civil War to World War II ==
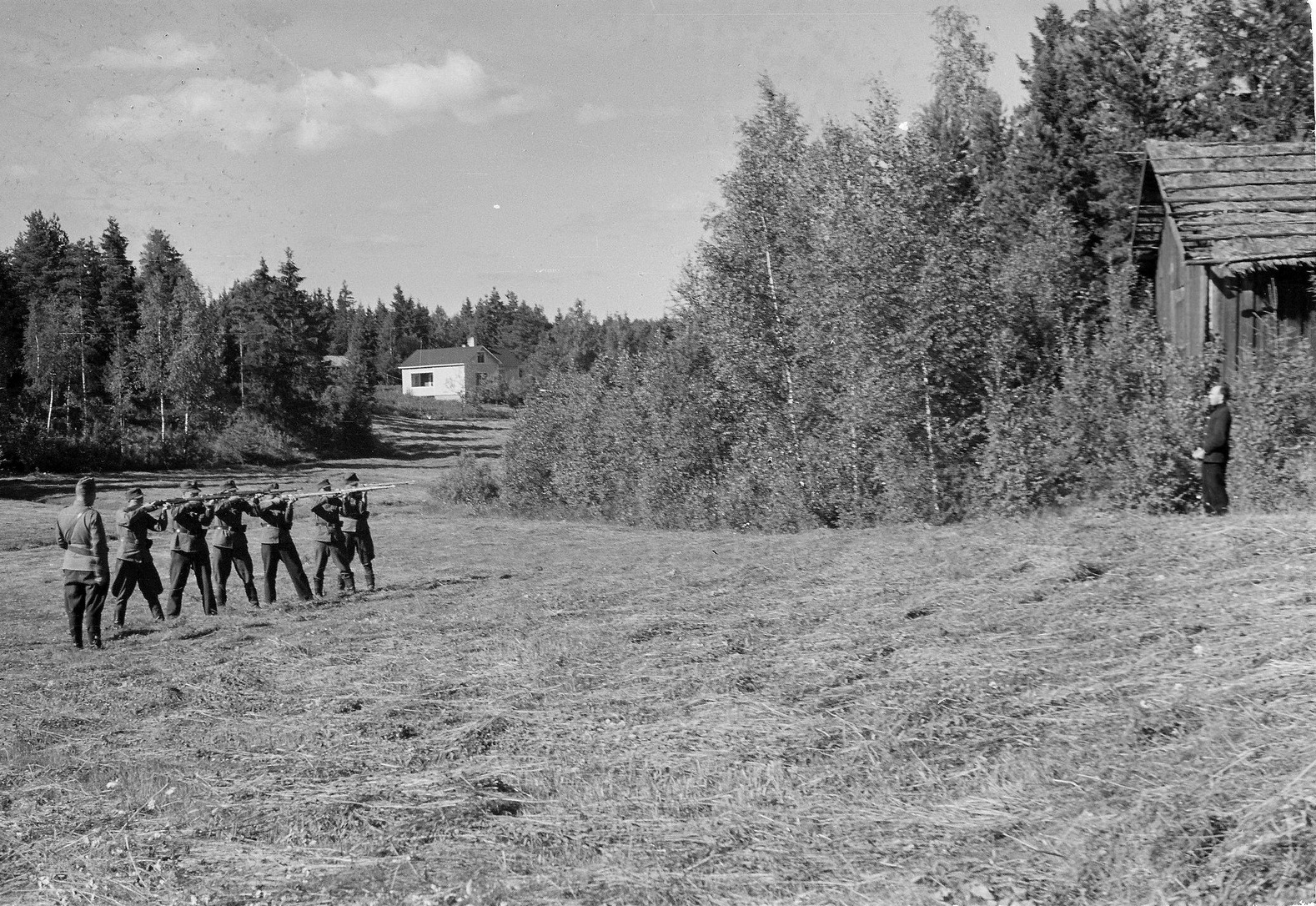
Execution of a Soviet infiltrator during World War 2

During and right after the Finnish Civil War of 1918, there were many executions, most done without due process. Approximately 1,400–1,650 Whites and 7,000–10,000 Reds were executed by the opposing side. The executions were invariably carried out by firing squad. The Shoot on the Spot Declaration allowed White commanders to summarily execute prisoners, something which was of questionable legality, but the issue became moot after general amnesties.

During the Winter War and Continuation War, approximately 550 death sentences were carried out. 455 (some 90%) of those executed were Soviet infiltrators, spies and saboteurs. The officer's authority to execute soldiers refusing to obey commands or fleeing from combat was exercised only in 13 cases. The most famous case is the execution of conscientious objector Arndt Pekurinen in autumn 1941, who was also the penultimate Finn ever to be executed for civilian crimes (conscientious objection during wartime was considered high treason). As he declined taking a rifle and going to the front line, he was sentenced to death without trial for disobedience by his commanding officer, Captain Valkonen. Nobody in his battalion volunteered for the firing squad, and Captain Valkonen had to use threat of punishment to order a soldier, Corporal Asikainen, to shoot him. Pekurinen's death was widely considered miscarriage of justice by his service mates.

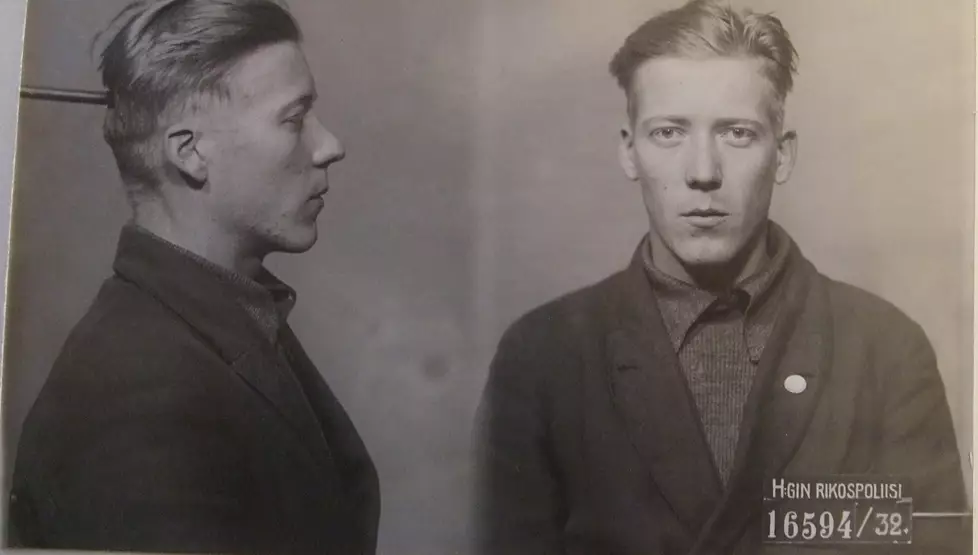
Mugshot of Toivo Koljonen, the notorious axe murderer

The last Finn to be executed for civilian crimes was Toivo "Kirves" (Axe) Koljonen, who killed a family of six with an axe in 1942. He was shot by a military police firing squad along with Soviet spies sentenced to death for espionage in 1943. The last woman executed in Finland was Martta Koskinen, shot for espionage and high treason in 1943. The last Finn to be executed for any crimes was Private Olavi Laiho, who was shot for desertion, high treason and espionage in Oulu, 2 September 1944. One day later a group of three Soviet infiltrators were shot, as the last persons to be executed in Finland.

== In Post-war Finland ==
In independent Finland, capital punishment for crimes committed in peacetime was abolished by law in 1949, and in 1972 it was abolished entirely. In addition, the current Constitution of Finland, adopted in 2000, – specifically Chapter 2, Section 7 – prohibits capital punishment:

Jokaisella on oikeus elämään sekä henkilökohtaiseen vapauteen, koskemattomuuteen ja turvallisuuteen. Ketään ei saa tuomita kuolemaan, kiduttaa eikä muutoinkaan kohdella ihmisarvoa loukkaavasti. (in English: Everyone has the right to life, personal liberty, integrity and security. No one shall be sentenced to death, tortured or otherwise treated in a manner violating human dignity.)

== Methods ==
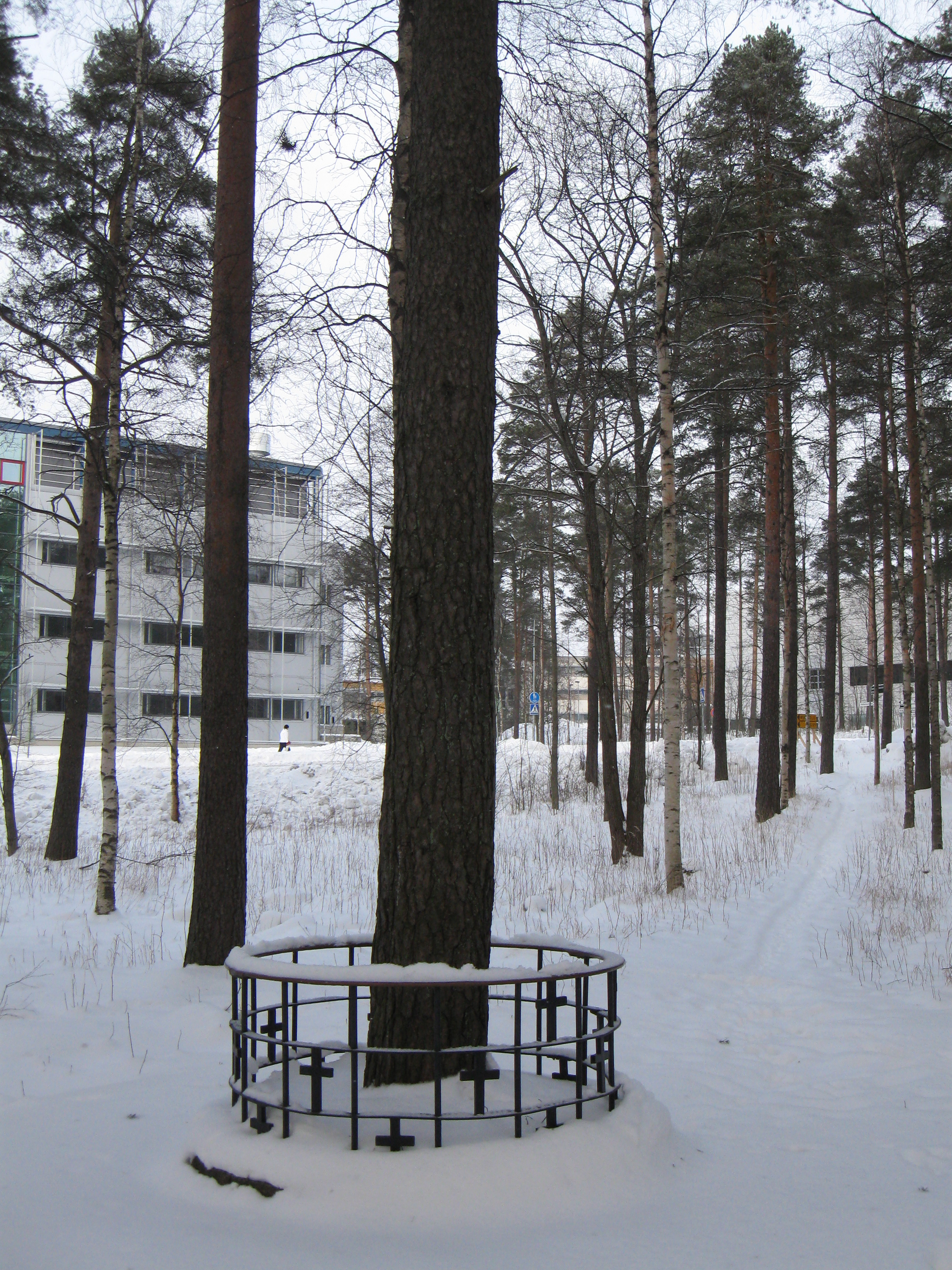
A presumed gallow tree of Taavetti Lukkarinen in Oulu

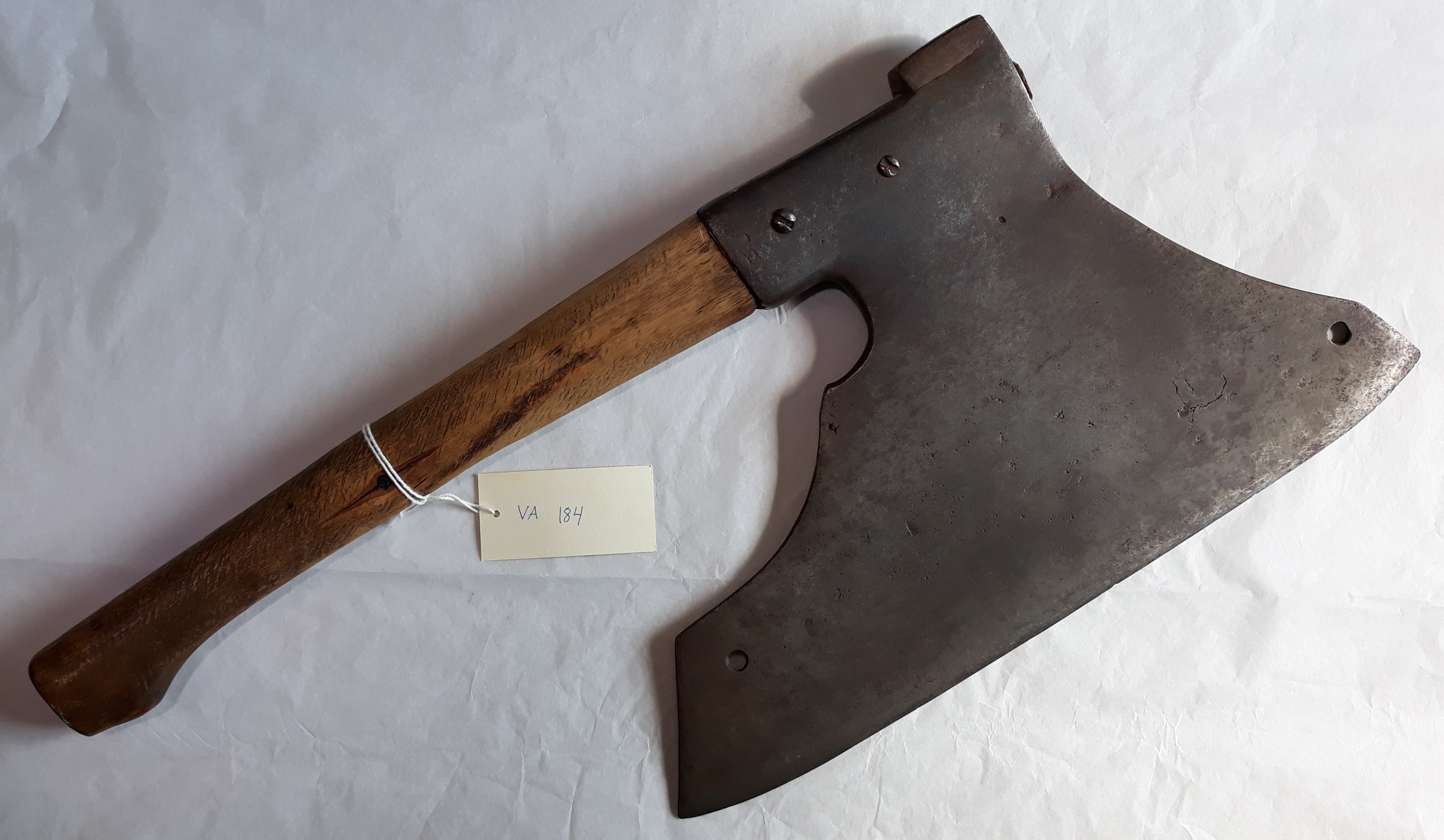
A beheading axe from the Hämeenlinna prison museum.

In the 19th century and before, as in the other Nordic countries, beheading by axe was the most common method of execution. In the 20th century, firing squads were used. The official beheading axe of Finland is today on display at Museum of Crime, Vantaa.

Some notable lasts:

- Last person executed in peacetime in Finland: Tahvo Putkonen, 1825, beheaded with axe for murder
- Last person hanged in Finland: Taavetti Lukkarinen, 1916, at Oulu. He was hanged for high treason under Czarist Russian martial law. Instead of gallows, he was hanged in a pine tree. The tree is today protected as a memorial.
- Last person executed for a civilian crime in Finland: Toivo Koljonen, 1943, by firing squad for six murders.
- Last woman executed in Finland: Martta Koskinen, 1943, by firing squad for espionage and high treason.
- Last Finn executed: Private Olavi Laiho, 2 September 1944, by firing squad for desertion, espionage and high treason.
- Last person executed in Finland: a group of three Soviet infiltrators, 3 September 1944, by firing squad for espionage.

== Reappearance ==
On 16 December 2015, Teuvo Hakkarainen, a member of Finnish Parliament and Finns Party, inquired Minister of Justice (who is also a member of the same party) if capital punishment could be reinstated. This was in reference to the court case against two Iraqi asylum seekers, who were members of ISIS, for 11 murders. Hakkarainen commented that repeated murder would justify capital punishment, even if done by a native Finn. Some members of the Parliament condemned his suggestion.

== Polling ==
In a 2006 poll by Ilta-Sanomat, found nearly a third of Finns would support instating the death penalty. Twenty-nine percent would condone it, while 63 percent oppose it. Those most in favour include men and middle-aged people.
