= Kemi railway station =

Railway station in Kemi, Finland

Kemi
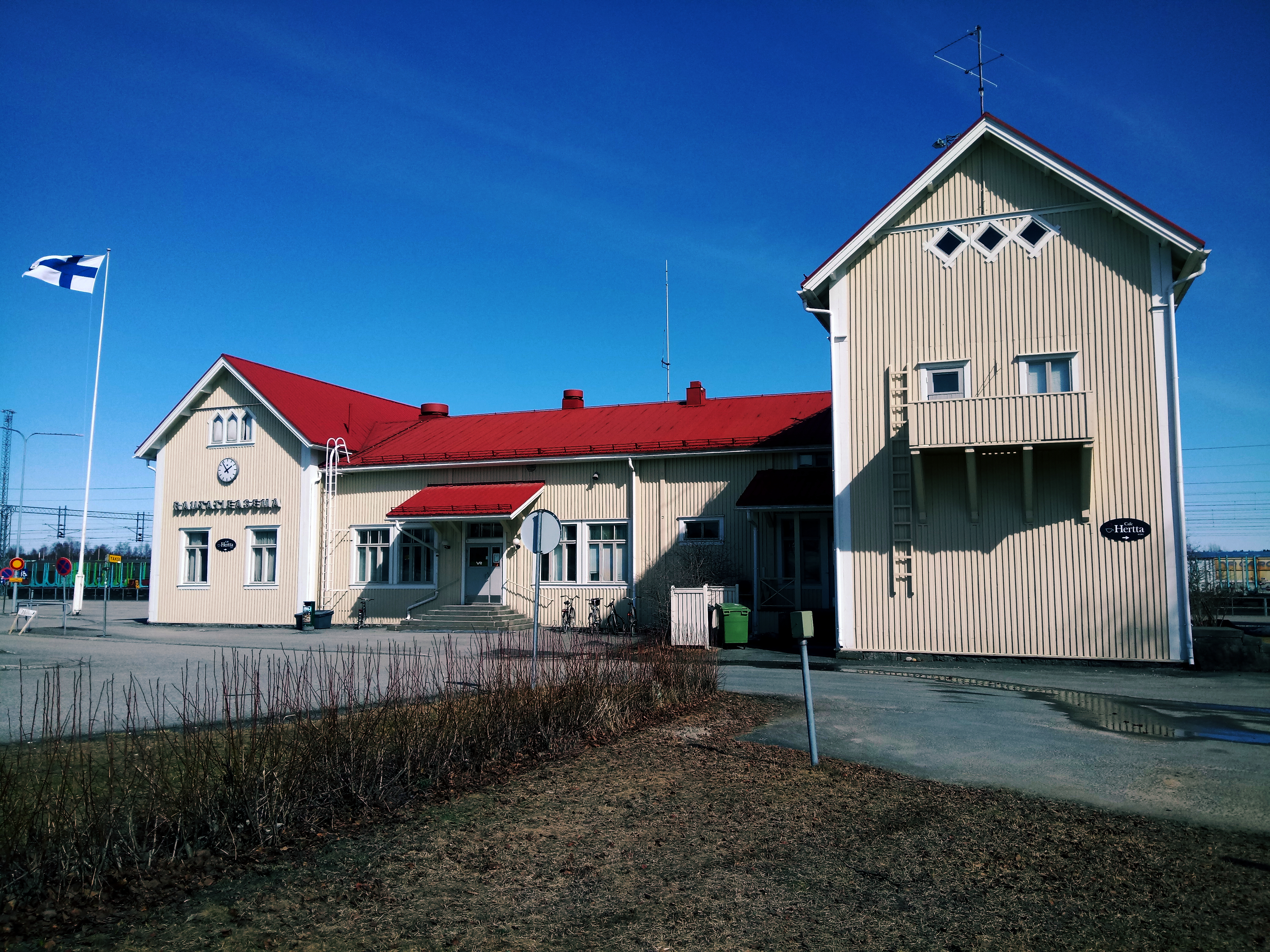
- Kemi railway station

General information
- Location: Rautatienkatu 3, 94100 Kemi
- Coordinates: 65.737227°N 24.573798°E
- System: VR Group station
- Owner: Finnish Transport Infrastructure Agency
- Line: Oulu-Tornio railway
- Platforms: 3
- Tracks: 11

Construction
- Structure type: ground station

History
- Opened: 1903
- Electrified: 2003

Passengers
- 2008: 185,000

Services
| Preceding station | VR Group | Following station |
|---|---|---|
| Oulu towards Helsinki | Helsinki–Kolari (overnight service) | Ylitornio towards Kolari |
| Oulu towards Helsinki | Helsinki–Kemijärvi (overnight service) | Tervola towards Kemijärvi |
Location

Kemi railway station (Finnish: Kemin rautatieasema) is located in the town of Kemi in the Lapland Region of Finland. It is operated by VR. The distance to the Helsinki Central railway station, via Haapamäki and Oulu stations is 858.3 kilometres.

The station lies between the Kemi centre and Finnish national road 4, near the town centre services. All passenger trains stop at the station, and the station has a ticket office, a waiting room and a Junamaatti ticket vending machine. Kemi also has a lot of cargo traffic.

Kemi no longer has train traffic operators, instead the traffic is controlled remotely from Oulu. Track switching in cargo traffic requires a lot of trackyard personnel.

== Lautiosaari railway junction ==
Although the tracks to Rovaniemi and to Kolari via Tornio actually separate at the Laurila cargo station north of Kemi, Kemi is an important junction for train traffic. From the Lautiosaari switch north of Kemi, there is also a side track to the Elijärvi mine.

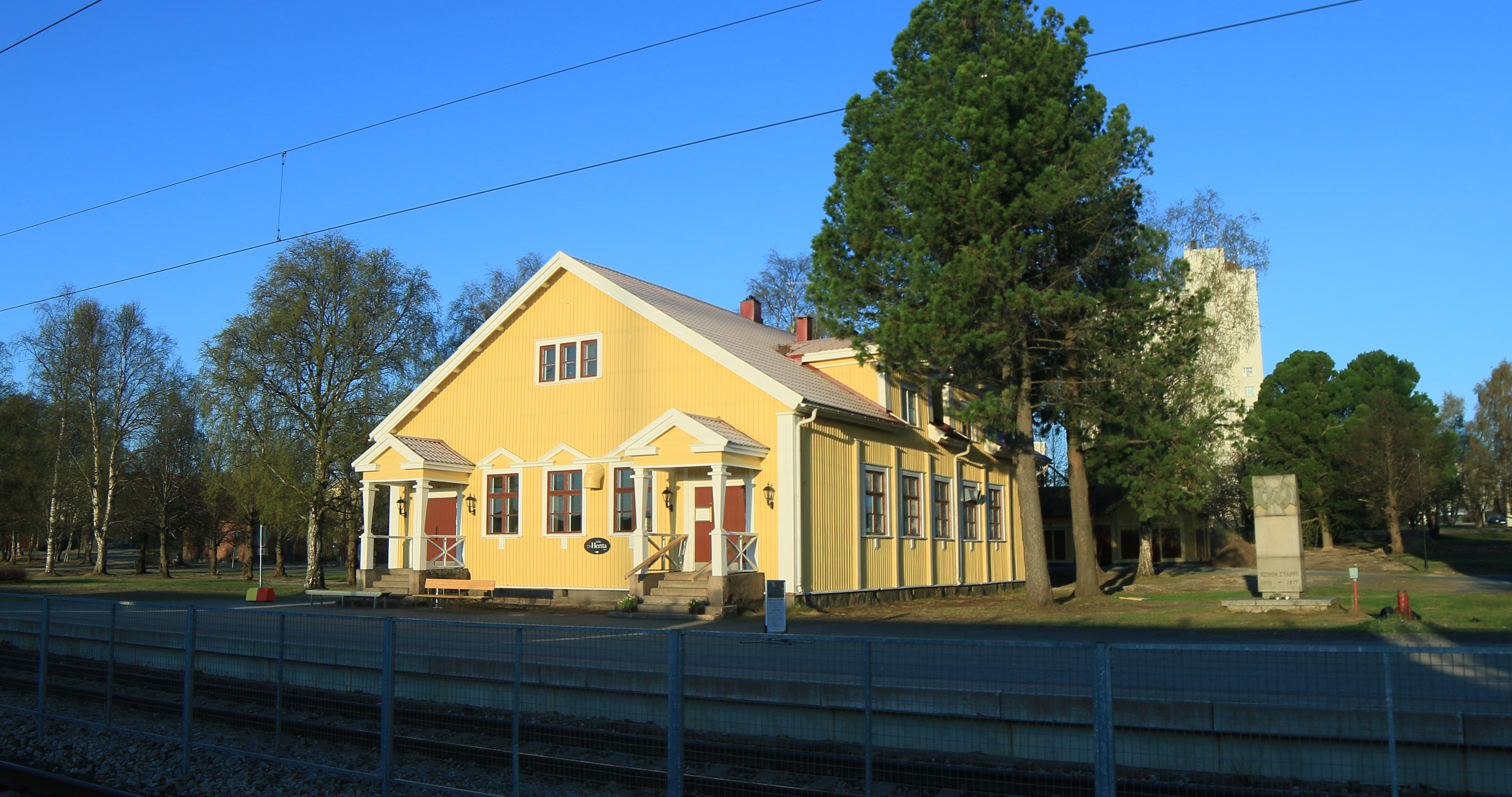
Restaurant

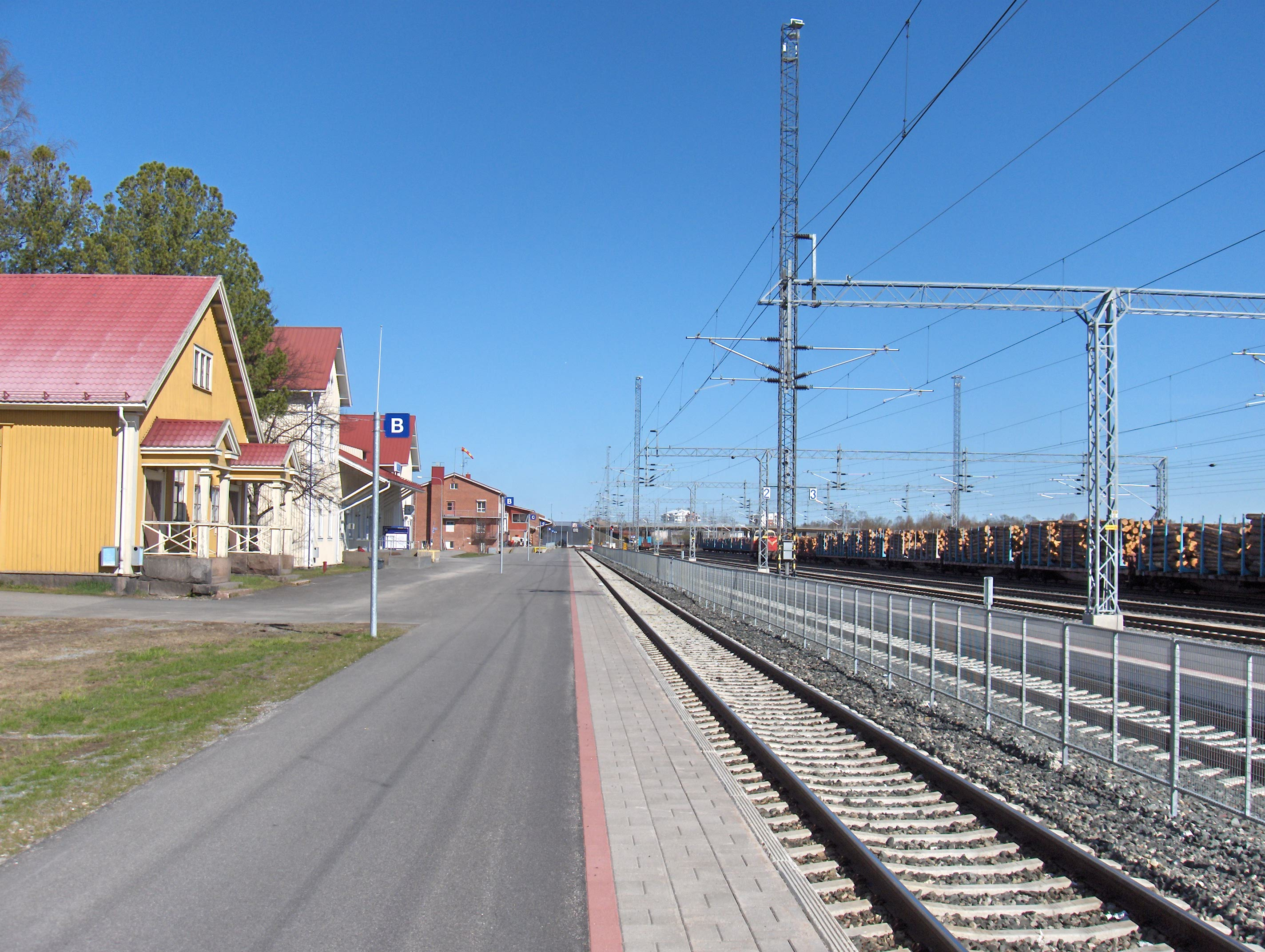
Platform area

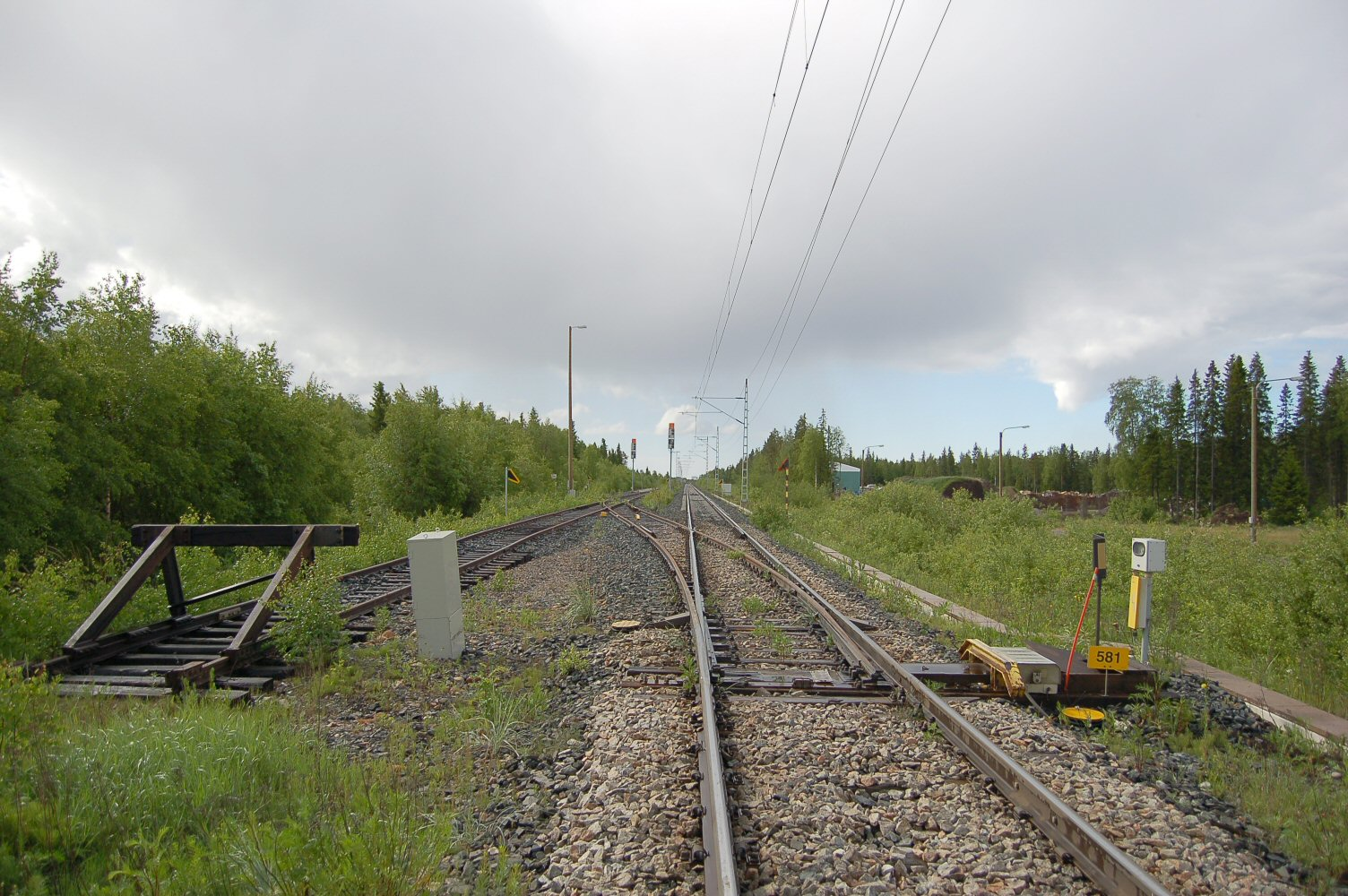
Lautiosaari

Lautiosaari railway junction (standard abbreviation: Li) is a railway junction in the city of Kemi in Finland. The junction is located approximately two kilometers north from Kemi railway station on Oulu–Tornio main line where the Elijärvi branch line diverges from the main line. The junction is named after nearby Lautiosaari village within Keminmaa municipality.

The junction consists of three railway signals and two interlocked and corresponding railway switches, forming a set of catch points protecting the main line. The junction was opened for traffic in 1985, and it was in active use until 2005, when the Elijärvi mine chose trucks over trains for its ore transportation needs between Elijärvi and Tornio.

== Trackyards ==
The Kemi railway station has a large trackyard, divided into personnel train tracks and a cargo trackyard. The trackyard was completely renovated and electrified from 2001 to 2003. The station has three platform tracks. All passenger trains that stop at the station normally use track 1.

The station also has a side track to the Port of Kemi in the district of Ajos. On this side track are the trackyards of Veitsiluoto, Rivi and Ajos.
