= Tervola railway station =

Railway station in Tervola, Finland

Tervola
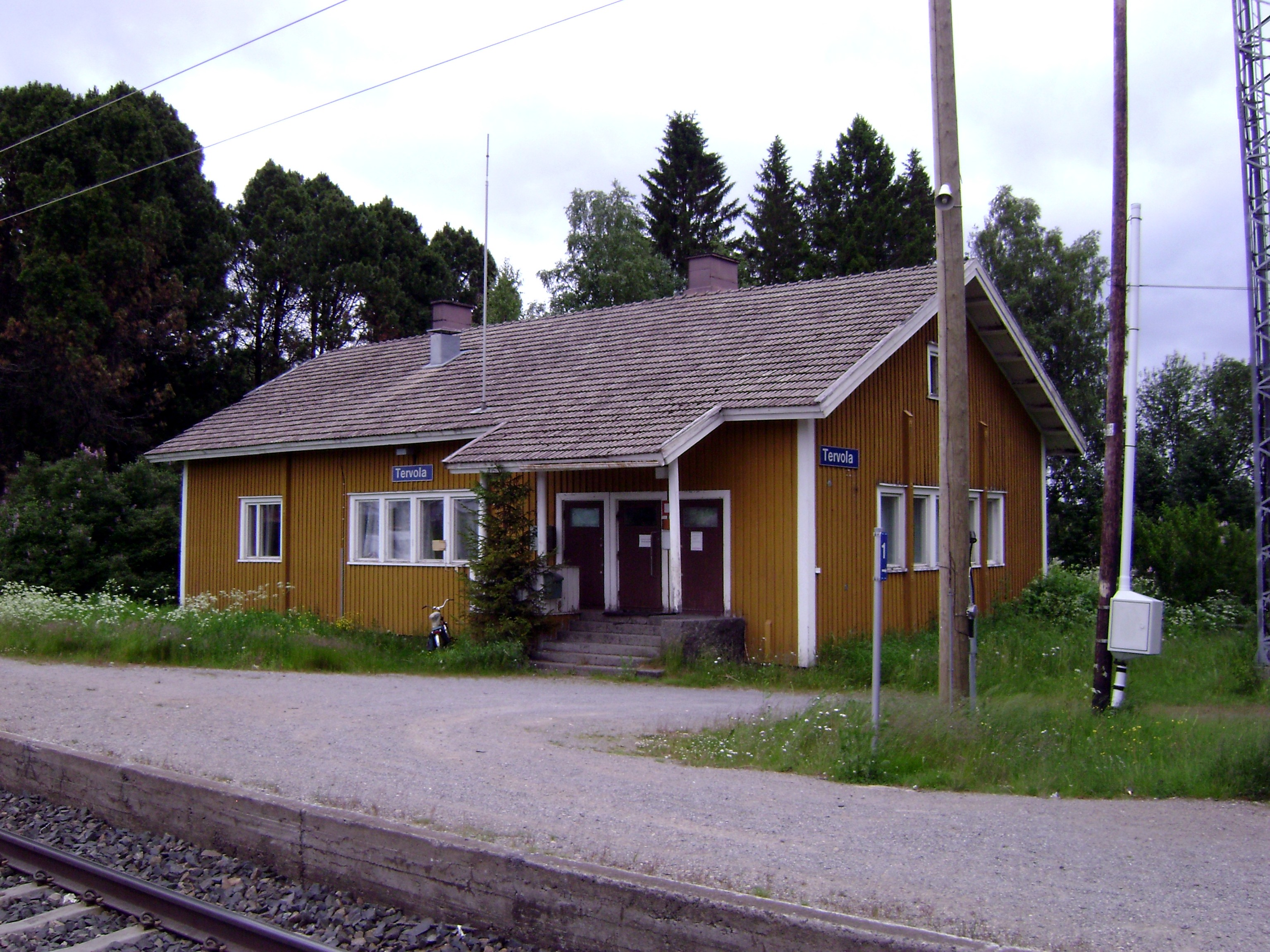
- Tervola railway station

General information
- Location: Asemantie 25, 95330 Kaisajoki
- Coordinates: 66.0816°N 24.7725°E
- System: VR Group station
- Owner: Finnish Transport Agency
- Tracks: 2

Construction
- Structure type: ground station

History
- Opened: 1909
- Electrified: 2004

Passengers
- 12 000 ( 2008 )

Services
Preceding station	VR Group	Following station
Kemi towards Oulu	Oulu–Rovaniemi	Muurola towards Rovaniemi
Location

The Tervola railway station is located in the municipality of Tervola in Lapland, Finland. The distance to the Helsinki Central railway station is 900.5 kilometres, measured via the Haapamäki and Seinäjoki railway station. The station was taken into use when the track between Kemi and Rovaniemi was completed in 1909.

== Services ==
All passenger trains between Oulu and Rovaniemi stop at Tervola, with the exception of Helsinki–Kemijärvi–Helsinki night train services PYO 265 and PYO 274 as well as the seasonal Rovaniemi–Helsinki night train service PYO 264. The station does not serve cargo traffic. The traffic control is handled remotely from the Oulu railway station. The trackyard has one drive-through side track and one loading track.

== Departure tracks ==
Tervola railway station has two platform tracks. Passenger trains that stop at the station primarily use track 1. When two passenger trains meet at the station, trains to Rovaniemi use track 1 and trains towards Oulu use track 2.
