= Laiho =

Laiho is a Finnish surname. Notable people with the surname include:

- Alexi Laiho, Finnish guitarist and composer
- Hanna Laiho (born 1975), Finnish gymnast
- Mia Laiho, Finnish politician
- Olavi Laiho (1907–1944) Finnish criminal
- Samuli Laiho, Finnish guitarist
