= Kemi-Tornio Airport =

Kemi-Tornio Airport Kemi-Tornion lentoasema

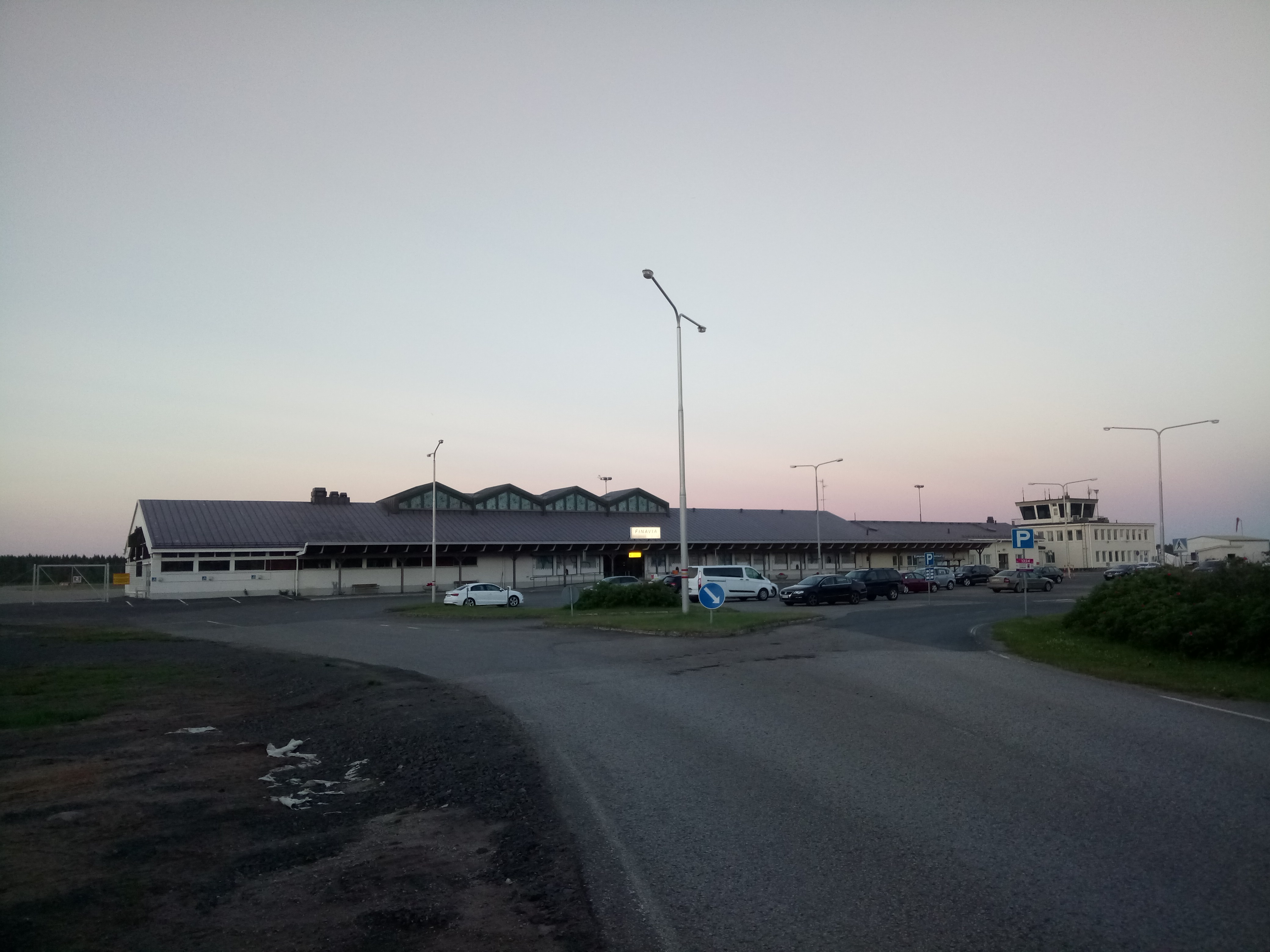
- IATA: KEM; ICAO: EFKE

Summary
- Airport type: Public
- Operator: Finavia
- Location: Kemi, Finland
- Opened: June 18, 1939
- Built: 1937-1939
- Elevation AMSL: 62 ft / 18.9 m
- Coordinates: 65°46′45″N 024°35′05″E
- Website: www.finavia.fi

Map
- Location within Finland

Runways
Direction	Length		Surface
Direction	ft	m	Surface
18/36	8,212	2,503	Asphalt

Statistics (2018)
- Passengers: 66,800
- Landings: 1,031
- Source: AIP Finland

Kemi-Tornio Airport (IATA: KEM, ICAO: EFKE; Finnish: Kemi-Tornion lentoasema; Swedish: Kemi-Torneå flygplats) is an airport in Kemi, Finland. The airport is located near the district of Lautiosaari, east of the Kemijoki (Kemi River), 6 kilometres (3.7 mi) north of Kemi city centre and 18 kilometres (11 mi) east of Tornio city centre. The airport is owned and operated by Finavia.

== Terminal ==
There is a small cafe/restaurant landside at the airport, open to the public and to passengers. There is also a small gift shop for souvenirs. The following car rental companies serve at Kemi airport: Avis, Budget, Europcar, Hertz and Scandia Rent.

== Airlines and destinations ==
The following airlines operate regular scheduled and charter flights at Kemi-Tornio Airport:

Airlines	Destinations
Finnair	Helsinki, Kokkola

== Statistics ==
=== Passengers ===
Annual passenger statistics for Kemi-Tornio Airport
Year	Domestic passengers	International passengers	Total passengers	Change
2005	85,133	2,750	87,883	−15.5% ▼
2006	82,867	2,157	85,024	−3.3% ▼
2007	89,661	2,606	92,267	+8.5% ▲
2008	93,496	2,391	95,887	+3.7% ▲
2009	94,243	1,366	95,609	−0.3% ▼
2010	95,079	1,483	96,562	+0.6% ▲
2011	91,895	1,862	93,757	-2.9% ▼
2014	57,707	1,333	59,040	+2.4% ▲
2015	55,206	1,136	56,342	-4.6% ▼
2016	60,645	669	61,314	+8.8% ▲
2017	95,610	8,852	104,462	+70.4% ▲
2018	65,004	1,796	66,800	−36.1% ▼
2019	62,516	1,063	63,579	−4.8% ▼
2020	13,661	0	13,661	−78.5% ▼
2021	16,705	33	16,738	+22.5% ▲
2022	21,735	748	22,501	+34.4% ▲
2023	35,614	1,737	37,351	+66.0% ▲
2024	30,638	2,206	32,844	−12.1% ▼
2025	32,215	2,409	34,624	+5.4% ▲

=== Freight and mail ===
Loaded/Unloaded freight and mail (tons) Kemi-Tornio Airport
Year	Domestic freight	Domestic mail	International freight	International mail	Total freight and mail	Change
2005	47	2	2	0	51	−23.9% ▼
2006	56	1	0	0	57	+11.8% ▲
2007	78	1	0	0	79	+38.6% ▲
2008	88	1	1	0	90	+13.9% ▲
2009	56	1	0	0	57	−36.7% ▼
2010	25	1	0	0	27	−52.6% ▼

== Ground transportation ==
There is no public transportation directly to the airport. However, there is a bus stop around 700 metres (2,300 ft) from the airport. Airport taxi to Kemi takes around 15 minutes in travel time whereas the trip to Tornio takes approximately 25 minutes. There is a parking lot just in front of the terminal door.

== See also ==
- List of the largest airports in the Nordic countries
