= Nasser Kara =

Malawian politician and convicted murderer

Nasser Kara is a Malawian politician who was convicted of the murder of his driver in 2002.

Kara was a member of the National Assembly of Malawi for the opposition Malawi Congress Party. In early 2002, when Kara was Director of Public Prosecutions, Kara's wife Liwoli, and her friend, Chimwemwe Kamfoso, disappeared. Two months later, the body of Kara's driver was found in a Mercedes-Benz in a river.

Kara was arrested in May 2002 after being sought for a number of weeks, and police produced a written confession in which Kara admitted to killing his wife, his driver, and Kamfoso. Kara and his two bodyguards, Charles Kulemeka and Phillip Singo, were tried for the murder of his driver in Salima. (There has been no murder trial for his wife and Kamfoso because their bodies have never been found. Under Malawian law, unless a body is found, no murder prosecution can proceed until seven years have elapsed.) in February 2004, Kara was convicted by a jury and the bodyguards were acquitted. Kara was sentenced to death by hanging. He is the first member of the Malawian National Assembly to receive the death sentence.

Kara is currently on death row in Zomba Central Prison in Maula, a suburb of Lilongwe. Malawi has not executed a prisoner since 1992.
