= 1949 Kemi strike =

1949 Workers strike in Kemi, Finland

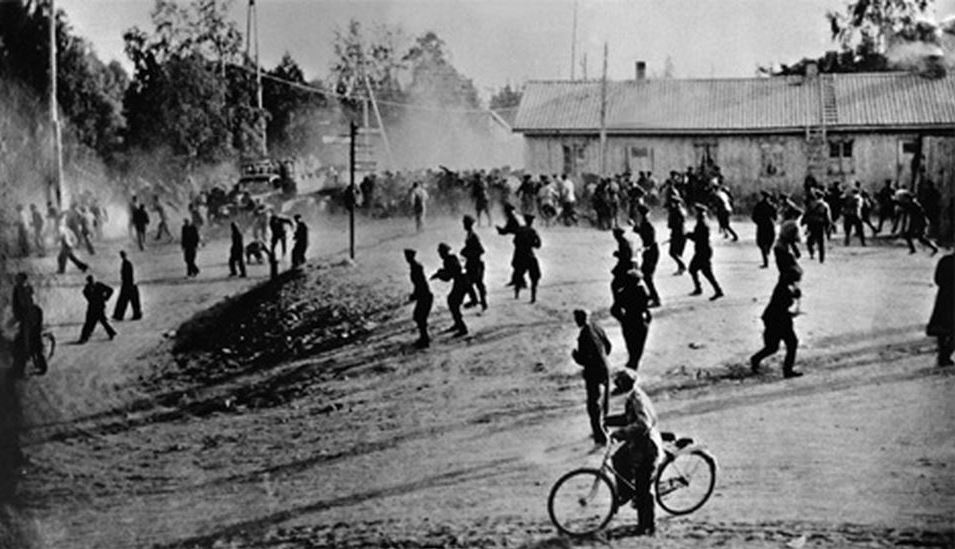
Clash between police and protesters

The 1949 Kemi strike was a strike in July–August 1949 by the workers of Kemi Oy (today a part of Metsä Group) in the Northern Finnish town of Kemi. On August 18 the strike escalated on a violent clash called "Kemi Bloody Thursday" between strikers and local police, two workers were killed and several injured. Kemi strike is so far the last fatal political protest in Finland.

The Kemi strike is seen as a struggle between Communist Party of Finland and the Prime Minister K-A Fagerholm's cabinet. The cabinet controlled a large part of the trade unions through the Social Democratic Party and the communists wanted to regain the power their parliamentary organization Finnish People's Democratic League had lost in the 1948 legislative election.

== The clash ==
The strike began on July 1, as the government wanted to cut the wages of Kemi Oy's lumber workers with more than 30 percent. It was soon joined by local lumberjacks, employers of the Kemi Oy sawmill and the dockers of Port of Kemi. Prime Minister Karl-August Fagerholm declared the strike illegal as it went on for several weeks. The strike caused a jam of 20,5 million cubic foot of logs to the mouth of Kemijoki river. The employers recruited strikebreakers, bringing them to work under police protection. On August 18 a peaceful march of more the 3,000 strikers was on its way to the estuary, where the strikebreakers were driving logs and releasing the jam. As the march was stopped by armed policemen, a violent riot burst out. Protesters were equipped with sticks and rocks, while the police were using their batons and guns. One striker was shot and a female worker was fatally hit by a truck. It is still unclear who fired the deadly shot. According to official forensic examination the bullet was not shot from any of the police guns, although declassified secret police documents reveal that the police were shooting at strikers. One police officer stated he was prevented from shooting at a violent striker only by his gun jamming.

== Aftermath ==
As a result, president Juho Kusti Paasikivi called a general alert of the armed forces and the government sent army troops to Kemi. This ended up with an arrest of 22 leading activists. A total number of 127 strikers were later accused of uprising, 63 of them were sent to prison. The police violence caused a series of sympathy strikes around Finland by communist dominated trade unions like the seamen's union led by Niilo Wälläri and a large number of metal workers.

Finnish government was even afraid of communist uprising and Soviet intervention. Communists in turn, were accusing the government for violating the Paris Peace Treaty since they had sent military against the striking workers. The American press characterized the incident as a "test for Finnish democracy". Soviet newspaper Pravda was talking about "police terror" and "Prime Minister Fagerholm's collaboration with American imperialists". The sympathy strikes were finally put down on 22 August, as the Social Democrat controlled Central Organisation of Finnish Trade Unions expelled the striking unions. Several other unions decided to cancel their planned strikes. Some trade union leaders were later put on trial and given short sentences.
