= Toivo Koljonen =

Finnish murderer (1910–1943)

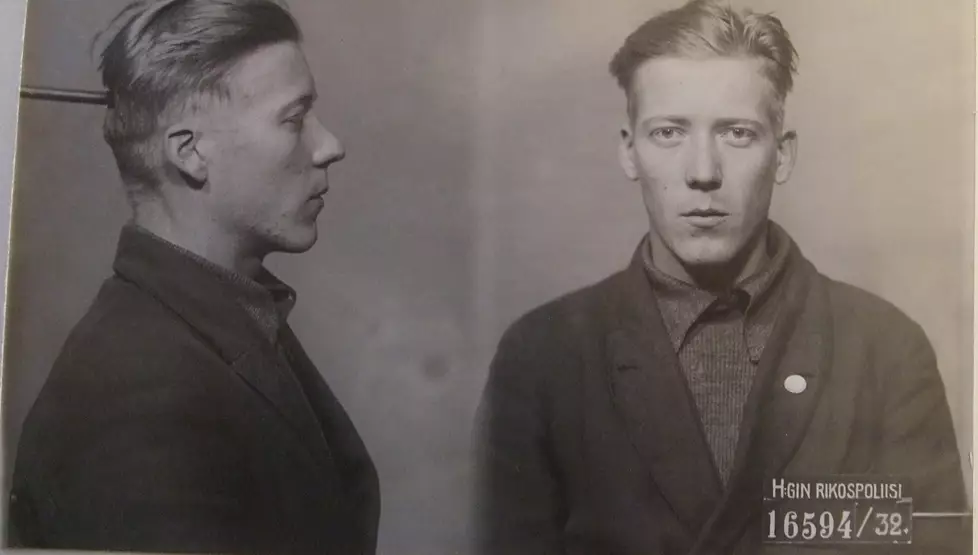
- Koljonen in 1932
- Born: 12 December 1910; Lahti, Grand Duchy of Finland
- Died: 21 October 1943 (aged 32); Maaria, Finland
- Status: Executed by firing squad
- Conviction: Murder (6 counts)
- Penalty: Death

Details
- Date: 17 March 1943
- Country: Finland
- Location: Huittinen
- Killed: 6
- Weapon: Axe

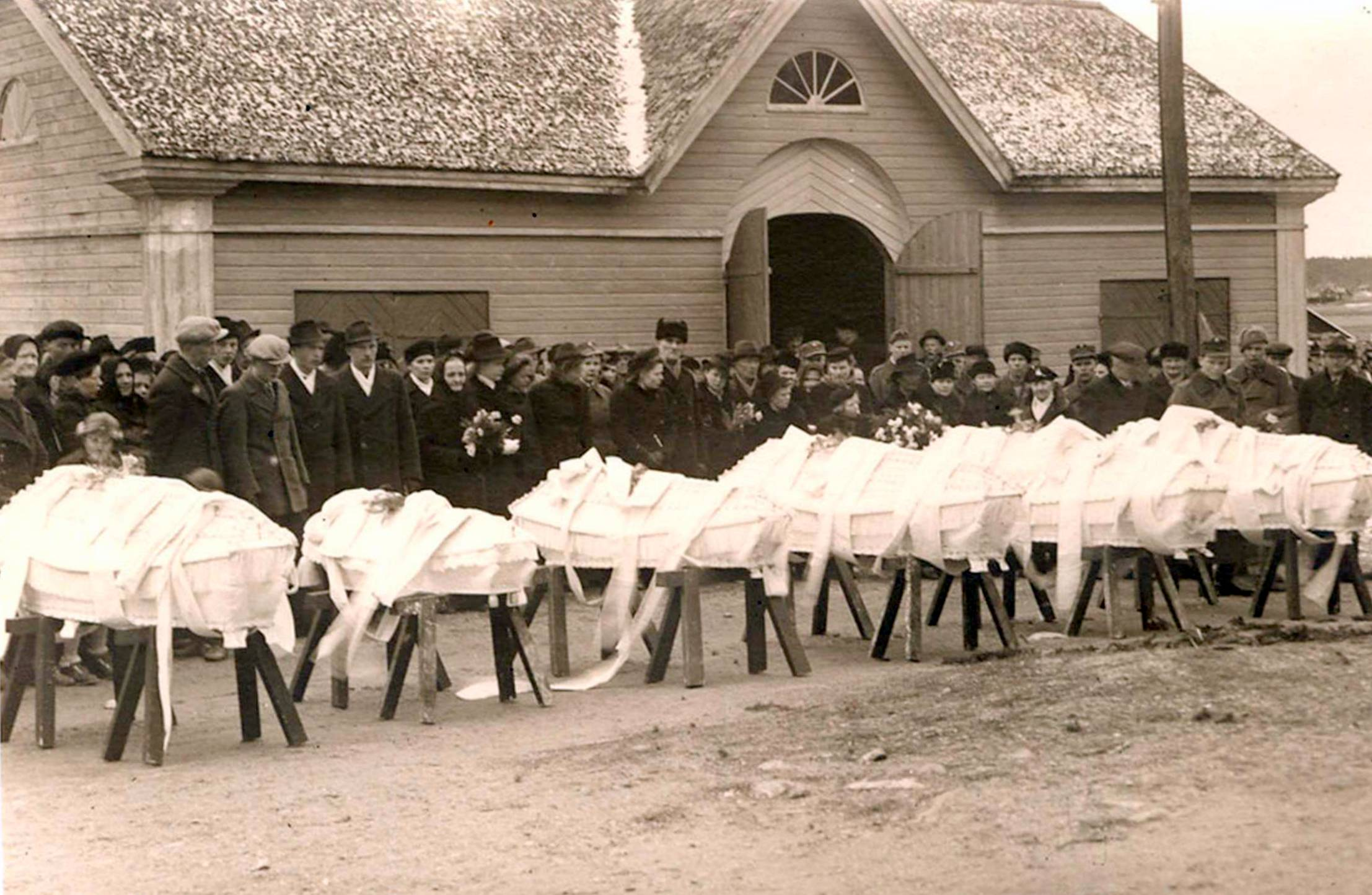
Funeral for the victims of Toivo Koljonen

Toivo Harald "Kirves" Koljonen (12 December 1910 – 21 October 1943) was a Finnish mass murderer and the last Finn executed for a civilian crime. He was executed by firing squad for a sextuple murder.

Koljonen was born 1910 in Lahti, Finland. He had been sentenced to prison for stealing petrol and incarcerated at Riihimäki Prison, from which he was moved to Huittinen auxiliary prison. He escaped from prison in 1943 and attempted to hide from the authorities.

On 17 March 1943, he found a nearby farmhouse where five family members lived – a mother, two grandparents, and two children. Two additional family members, the father and the eldest son, had been conscripted into the army and, consequently, were not present at the time. Koljonen first hid in the stable, where he killed the daughter of the family with an axe (kirves in Finnish, which became his nickname). He then broke into the living quarters and killed the other four family members, as well as a woman from the neighbourhood who had been visiting. Koljonen escaped, but was caught at Valkeakoski.

According to the martial law in force during the war, Koljonen was sentenced to death for the six murders. He was shot together with convicted Soviet infiltrators at Kärsämäki quarry in Maaria, near Turku on 21 October 1943.

Koljonen was the last Finn to be executed for a civilian crime in Finland. All subsequent executions were for military crimes. After Koljonen, a handful of Finns were sentenced to death for murder. However, their sentences were commuted to life imprisonment in 1945. Capital punishment was abolished for civilian crimes in Finnish law in 1949.

Koljonen remains one of the worst axe murderers in Finnish history, along with Karl Malmelin.

== See also ==
- Juhani Aataminpoika

== General references ==
- "Veli Junttilan Suomi 1953 -kolumni 19.5. 2003: Kyllikki Saari katosi". Turun Sanomat (in Finnish). Finland. 19 May 2003. Archived from the original on 3 March 2016. "Incidentally ten years earlier an outrageous massacre had been made when the escapee Toivo Harald Koljonen killed six people with an axe at Huittinen in March 1943. For a long time it was thought that Koljonen ended his days by his own hand in prison. Journalist Pentti Eerikäinen wrote a few years ago in magazine "Alibi" that Koljonen received the death sentence and he was shot at Turku. According to certain information, he was shot at Kärsämäki gravel quarry together with captured Russian spies."
- Lindstedt, Jukka (1999). Kuolemaan tuomitut : kuolemanrangaistukset Suomessa toisen maailmansodan aikana [Sentenced to death: the death penalty in Finland during World War II]. Suomalaisen Lakimiesyhdistyksen julkaisuja (Finnish Lawyers' Association publications), A-sarja,, n:o 221. Law Dissertations (in Finnish). Helsinki: Suomalainen Lakimiesyhdistys (Finnish Lawyers' Association). pp. xciii, 680. ISBN 951-855-176-6. OCLC 44255875. Library of Congress cataloguing: http://lccn.loc.gov/00337053
- Pohjolan poliisi kertoo (Nordic police tells), Police yearbook, 1974
