= Sompujärvi =

- Village
- Location in Finland
- Coordinates: 65°57′N 25°10′E
- Country: Finland
- Province: Lapland
- Municipality: Keminmaa

Sompujärvi is a village in the municipality of Keminmaa in Lapland in north-western Finland. The village is southeast of the Sompujärvi lake.
