= Törmä =

- Village
- Location in Finland
- Coordinates: 65°54′N 24°37′E
- Country: Finland
- Province: Lapland
- Municipality: Keminmaa

Törmä is a village in the municipality of Keminmaa in Lapland in north-western Finland.
