= Pörhölä =

- Village
- Location in Finland
- Coordinates: 65°48′N 24°29′E
- Country: Finland
- Province: Lapland
- Municipality: Keminmaa

Pörhölä is a village in the municipality of Keminmaa in Lapland in north-western Finland.
