= Juhani Paasivirta =

Finnish historian (1919–1993)

- Born: 12 March 1919; Kemi, Finland
- Died: 11 July 1993 (aged 74); Turku, Finland

Academic work
- Discipline: Political history
- Institutions: Helsinki University; University of Turku

Juhani Paasivirta (12 March 1919 in Kemi – 11 July 1993 in Turku), Finnish historian, PhD 1947. Paasivirta became in 1951 associate professor in political history at Helsinki University and was 1965-83 professor on the subject at the University of Turku; research professor 1980–83.

Juhani Paasivirta pictures in an illustrative way the Finnish working class movement as part of a European phenomenon, the relations between World War I's victorious powers and Finland, the Finnish foreign politics administration and foreign policy to 1940. Amongst his works are Suomen itsenäisyyskysymys 1917 (2 parts, 1947–49), which is about Finland and the independence issue, Työväenliike yleiseurooppalaisena ilmiönä (2 parts, 1953–55), which is about the working class movement, Suomi vuonna 1918 and Suomi ja Eurooppa (3 parts, 1978–92).

== Bibliography in English ==
- Finland and Europe: the early years of independence 1917–1939 (1988)
- Finland and Europe: international cirses in the period of autonomy 1808–1914 (1981)
- The victors in world war I and Finland (1965)
- Plans for commercial agents and consuls of autonomous Finland (1963)
