= Jokisuu =

- Village
- Location in Finland
- Coordinates: 65.787757°N 24.512103°E
- Country: Finland
- Province: Lapland
- Municipality: Keminmaa

Jokisuu is a village in the municipality of Keminmaa in Lapland in north-western Finland.
