= Muurola railway station =

Railway station in Rovaniemi, Finland

Muurola
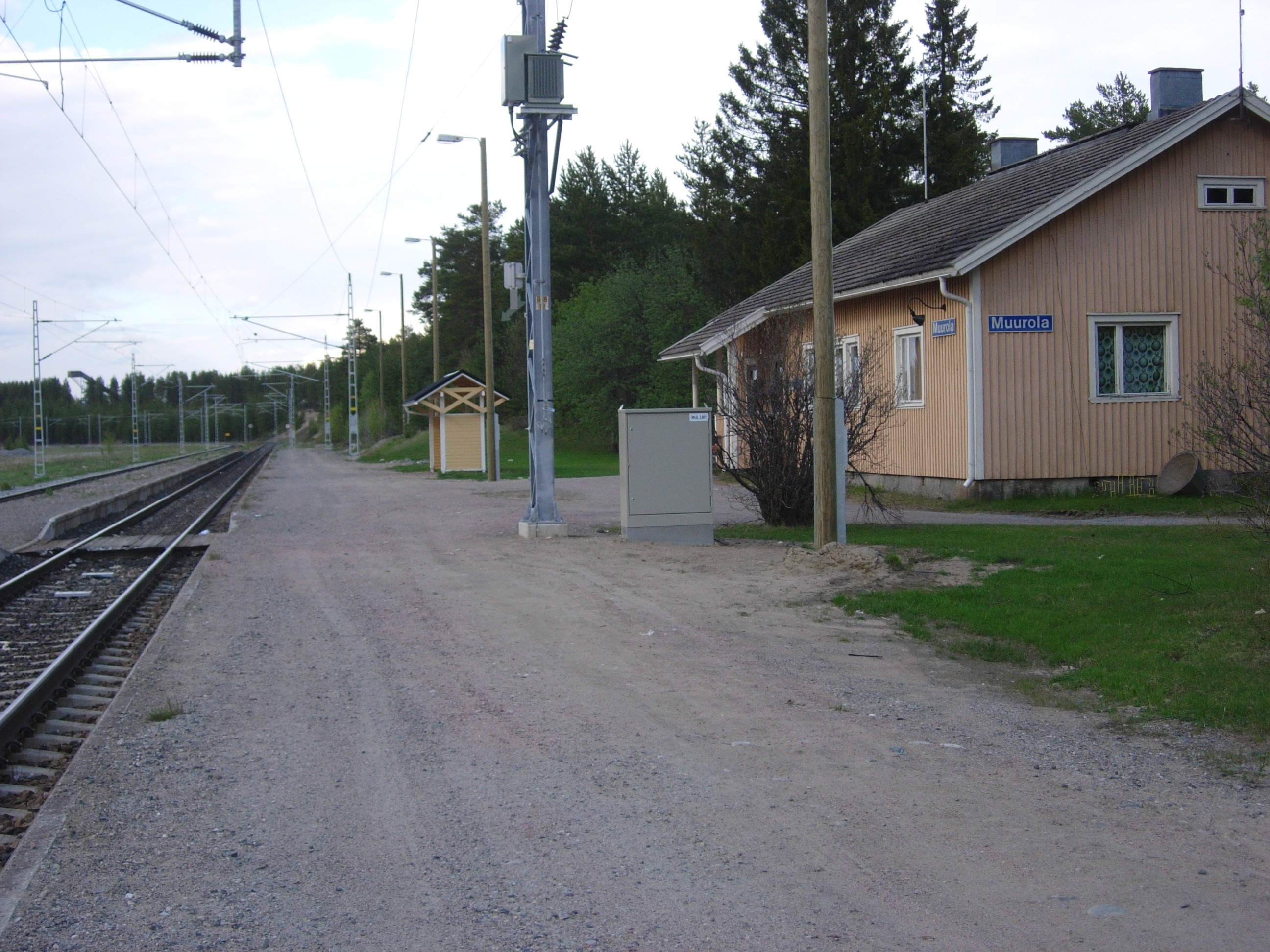
- Muurola railway station

General information
- Location: Ratatie 5, 97140 Muurola
- Coordinates: 66°22′14″N 25°22′31″E
- System: VR Group station
- Owner: Finnish Transport Agency
- Platforms: 2

Construction
- Structure type: ground station

History
- Opened: 1909
- Electrified: 2004

Services
Preceding station	VR Group	Following station
Tervola towards Oulu	Oulu–Rovaniemi	Rovaniemi Terminus
Location

The Muurola railway station, elevation 38 metres above sea level, is located in the district of Muurola in the city of Rovaniemi in Lapland, Finland. The distance to the Helsinki Central railway station is 948.5 kilometres, measured via the Haapamäki and Seinäjoki railway station.

== Services ==
All passenger trains between Oulu and Rovaniemi stop at Tervola, with the exception of Helsinki–Kemijärvi–Helsinki night train services PYO 265 and PYO 274 as well as the seasonal Rovaniemi–Helsinki night train service PYO 264. The station does not serve cargo traffic. The traffic control is handled remotely from the Oulu railway station.

== Departure tracks ==
Muurola railway station has two platform tracks. All passenger trains that stop at the station use track 1, with the exception of the seasonal Helsinki–Rovaniemi night train service PYO 267, which uses track 2 in order to give way for a regular daytime service bound to Helsinki which uses track 1 at that time.
