= Ilmola =

- Village
- Location in Finland
- Coordinates: 65°52′N 24°38′E
- Country: Finland
- Province: Lapland
- Municipality: Keminmaa

Ilmola is a village in the municipality of Keminmaa in Lapland, Finland.
