= Itäkoski =

- Village
- Location in Finland
- Coordinates: 65°58′N 24°46′E
- Country: Finland
- Province: Lapland
- Municipality: Keminmaa

Itäkoski is a village on the eastern shore of the municipality of Keminmaa in Lapland in north-western Finland.
