= Kokkola-Pietarsaari Airport =

Kokkola-Pietarsaari Airport Karleby-Jakobstad flygplats Kokkola-Pietarsaaren lentoasema

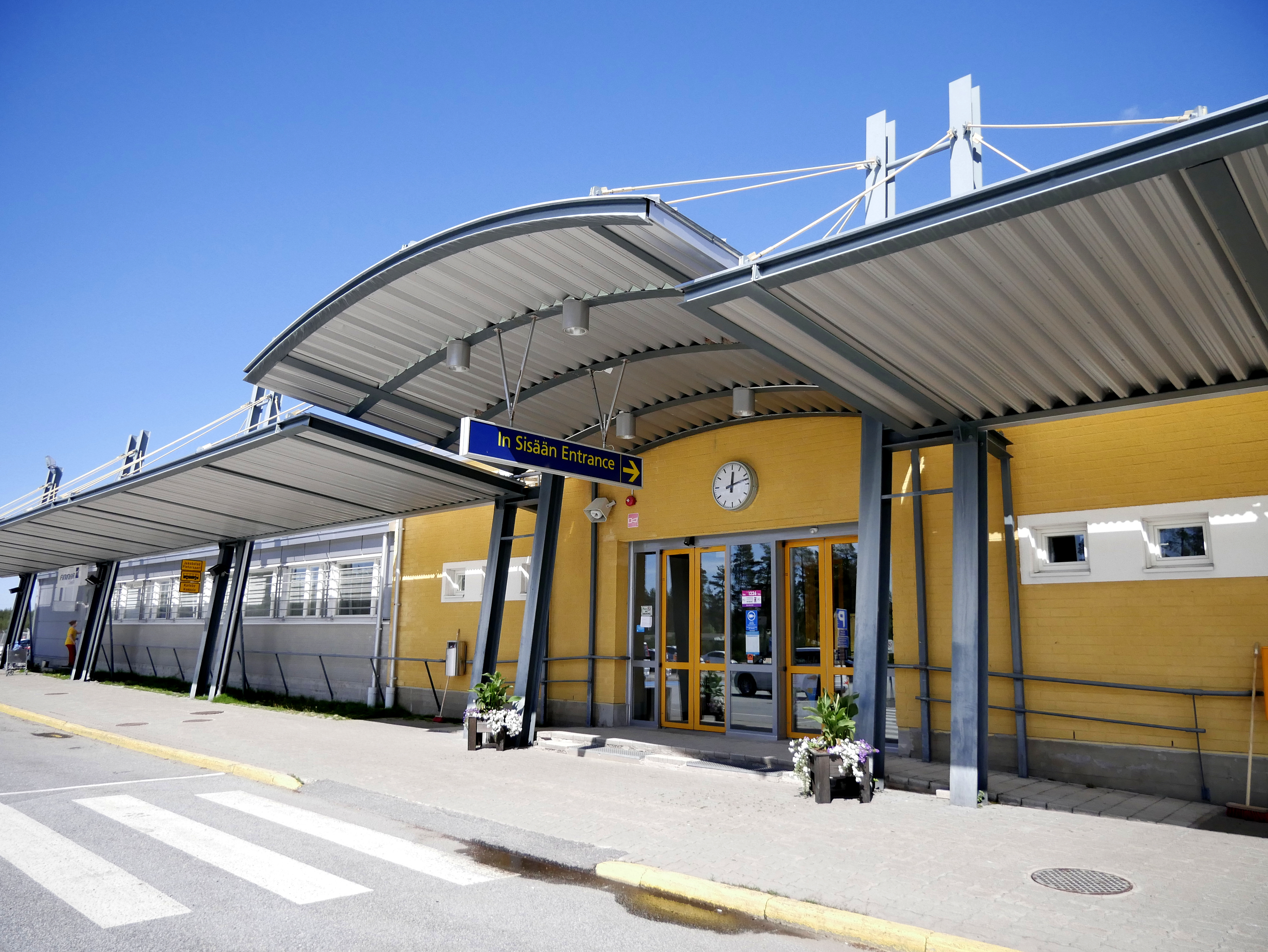
- IATA: KOK; ICAO: EFKK

Summary
- Airport type: Public
- Operator: Finavia
- Serves: Kokkola, Jakobstad
- Location: Kronoby
- Time zone: EET (UTC+2)
  - Summer (DST): EEST (UTC+3)
- Elevation AMSL: 85 ft (26 m)
- Coordinates: 63°43′13″N 023°08′21″E
- Website: kokkola-pietarsaariairport.fi

Map
- Location within Finland

Runways
Direction	Length		Surface
Direction	m	ft	Surface
01/19	2,500	8,202	Asphalt
11/29	700	2,297	Asphalt

Statistics (2018)
- Passengers: 68,636
- Landings: 1,486
- Source: AIP Finland; Statistics from Finavia

Kokkola-Pietarsaari Airport (Swedish: Karleby-Jakobstad flygplats, Finnish: Kokkola-Pietarsaaren lentoasema; IATA: KOK, ICAO: EFKK) is located in Kronoby, Finland, about 19 kilometres (12 mi) south of Kokkola city centre and 30 kilometres (19 mi) north-east of Jakobstad city centre.

== Overview ==
The airport opened to traffic in 1960, when Aero began operating a route between Helsinki and Kokkola-Pietarsaari, then Kruunupyy Airport. In 1964 the first airport and air traffic control building are completed.

In 1991 the airport's runway is extended to 2,500 metres (8,200 ft), while in 1997 the terminal's expansion is completed.

Until March 1, 2010, the name of the airport was Kruunupyy Airport or Kronoby Airport.

In 2010, about 80,000 passengers traveled via the airport. Scheduled serviced to Helsinki Airport is flown by Nordic Regional Airlines (Norra), operated as a code-share with Finnair. Finnair ended its own flights to Kokkola-Pietarsaari on 29 October 2010. Flights to Stockholm-Arlanda Airport by Nextjet began on 8 February 2014, with some flights being operated via Pori Airport. During winters, the airport is also used by charter flight airliners with a destination to southern Europe. The airport has two runways.

In 2012 the main runway was paved and the airport's lighting system was replaced.

In 2025, 572 flights landed at the airport, with 525 departing from Finland. In the same year, the airport handled 32,131 passengers in 2025, 90% arriving or departing on domestic flights.

== Airlines and destinations ==
The following airlines operate regular scheduled and charter flights at Kokkola-Pietarsaari Airport:

Airlines	Destinations
Finnair	Helsinki, Kemi
Freebird Airlines	Seasonal charter: Antalya

== Statistics ==
Annual passenger statistics for Kokkola-Pietarsaari Airport
Year	Domestic passengers	International passengers	Total passengers	Change
2005	84,548	13,967	98,515	−0.8% ▼
2006	85,798	12,378	98,176	−0.3% ▼
2007	84,615	11,402	96,017	−2.2% ▼
2008	88,008	10,315	98,323	+2.2% ▲
2009	81,634	10,563	92,197	−6.2% ▼
2010	76,979	3,202	80,181	−13.0% ▼
2011	87,384	7,300	94,684	+18.1% ▲
2012	60,476	26,600	87,076	−8% ▼
2013	51,790	17,201	68,991	−20.8% ▼
2014	48,478	20,191	68,669	−0.5% ▼
2015	69,534	18,505	88,039	+28.2% ▲
2016	69,433	19,333	88,766	+0.8% ▲
2017	60,681	19,138	79,819	−10.1% ▼
2018	57,286	11,350	68,636	−14.0% ▼
2019	51,316	4,797	56,113	−18.2% ▼
2020	9,054	114	9,168	−83.7% ▼
2021	6,076	281	6,357	−30.7% ▼
2022	9,754	7,444	17,196	+170.5% ▲
2023	25,761	3,511	29,272	+70.2% ▲
2024	26,735	4,044	30,779	+5.1% ▲
2025	28,901	3,230	32,131	+4.4% ▲

== Ground transportation ==
Means of transport at Kokkola-Pietarsaari Airport
Means of transport	Operator	Route	Destinations
Taxi	Dahl Citybus	Airport Taxi	Kokkola
Taxi	City Taxi Jeppis	Airport Taxi	Jakobstad

== See also ==
- List of the largest airports in the Nordic countries
