= Keminmaa =

Keminmaa Kiemâeennâm Ǩeeʹmmjânnam
- Municipality
- Keminmaan kunta Keminmaa kommun
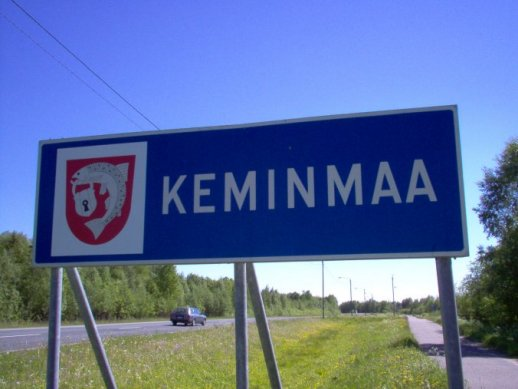

- Coat of arms

- Location of Keminmaa in Finland
- Interactive map of Keminmaa
- Coordinates: 65°48′N 024°33′E
- Country: Finland
- Region: Lapland
- Sub-region: Kemi–Tornio

Government
  - Municipal manager: Hannele Matinlassi

Area (2018-01-01)
  - Total: 647.24 km^{2} (249.90 sq mi)
  - Land: 627.27 km^{2} (242.19 sq mi)
  - Water: 20.73 km^{2} (8.00 sq mi)
  - Rank: 137th largest in Finland

Population (2025-12-31)
  - Total: 7,576
  - Rank: 124th largest in Finland
  - Density: 12.08/km^{2} (31.3/sq mi)

Population by native language
  - Finnish: 98.3% (official)
  - Swedish: 0.2%
  - Others: 1.5%

Population by age
  - 0 to 14: 16.7%
  - 15 to 64: 57.4%
  - 65 or older: 25.9%
- Time zone: UTC+02:00 (EET)
  - Summer (DST): UTC+03:00 (EEST)
- Website: www.keminmaa.fi

Keminmaa (Finnish: [ˈkemimˌmɑː]; until 1979 Kemin maalaiskunta; Inari Sami: Kiemâeennâm; Skolt Sami: Ǩeeʹmmjânnam) is a municipality of Finland. It is located near the towns of Kemi and Tornio in the Lapland region.

The municipality has a population of 7,576 (31 December 2025) and covers an area of 647.24 square kilometres (249.90 sq mi) of which 20.73 km^{2} (8.00 sq mi) is water. The population density is 12.08 inhabitants per square kilometre (31.3/sq mi).

== Geography ==
Neighbouring municipalities are Kemi, Simo, Tervola and Tornio.

=== Villages ===
- Hirmula
- Ilmola
- Itäkoski
- Jokisuu
- Laurila
- Lautiosaari
- Liedakkala
- Maula
- Pörhölä
- Ruottala (mostly on Tornio's territory)
- Sompujärvi
- Törmä
- Viitakoski

== Coat of arms ==
Blazon: Gules with a springing Silver salmon, holding a padlock in its mouth.

== Notable people ==
- Peter Franzén, Finnish actor
- Taavetti Lukkarinen, former foreman of Kemi Oy; convicted and hanged for treason
- Tomi Putaansuu, the Finnish singer of band Lordi, lived in Keminmaa when he was a child
- Nicolaus Rungius, local 17th century vicar whose mummified body is nowadays a tourist attraction in Keminmaa church
- Hannu Tihinen, Finnish football player
- Paavo Väyrynen, Finnish politician
