= Hirmula =

- Village
- Location in Finland
- Coordinates: 65°50′50″N 24°36′40″E
- Country: Finland
- Province: Lapland
- Municipality: Keminmaa

Hirmula is a village in the municipality of Keminmaa in Lapland in north-western Finland. It is located within the Eastern European Time Zone (GMT+2)
