= Liedakkala =

- Village
- Location in Finland
- Coordinates: 65°52′N 24°36′E
- Country: Finland
- Province: Lapland
- Municipality: Keminmaa

Liedakkala is a village in the municipality of Keminmaa in Lapland in north-western Finland.
