= Taavetti Lukkarinen =

Finnish man executed for treason

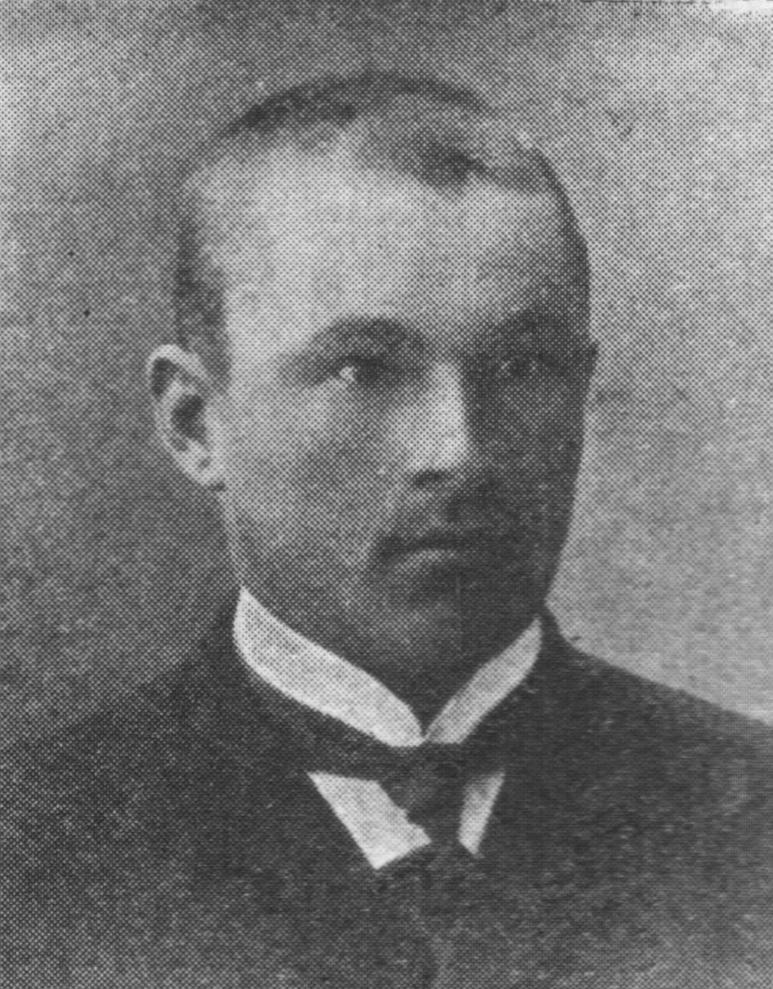
Taavetti Lukkarinen

Taavetti Lukkarinen (8 November 1884 in Nilsiä – 2 October 1916 in Oulu) was a former Kemi Oy's foreman from Keminmaa, Finland, who was sentenced to death for treason after helping German prisoners of war who had fled the Kirov Railway construction site via Finnish Lapland to Sweden. He was not an actual recruiter of the Jäger Movement.

Lukkarinen was caught helping German prisoners of war on 26 December 1915 at Koivu railway station. He had hidden three of his German sledges that had been lifted on a train in Rovaniemi. Lukkarinen and three Germans were arrested. Lukkarinen managed to escape to Sweden, but returned to Finland with a forged passport due to being homesick. Fearing a train inspection at Oulu railway station, he fell off the train around Kiviniemi station. This was discovered and Lukkarinen was arrested by the Russian gendarmeries in June 1916.

Lukkarinen was kept in vicious conditions in Oulu County Prison. The death sentence was handed down by a secret VI Army Military Court. The ruling has been accused of the Finnish Governor of the Province of Oulu, Axel Fabian af Enehjelm, who allegedly, under pressure from the Russians, contributed to the fact that a rather insignificant activist was made a warning example by sentencing him to death. According to another view, af Enehjelm, known for his pro-Russianism, sought to act in such a way that Lukkarinen was not pardoned. In prison, Lukkarinen was prevented from meeting his wife, who had traveled to Oulu specifically from Kemi.

Lukkarinen was hanged on 2 October 1916 in Oulu's Kontinkangas. The body was covered in a pit dug at the base of the pine tree. After Finland became independent, Lukkarinen's reputation was restored, his grave was opened and his earthly remains officially buried in Oulu Cemetery in 1917.

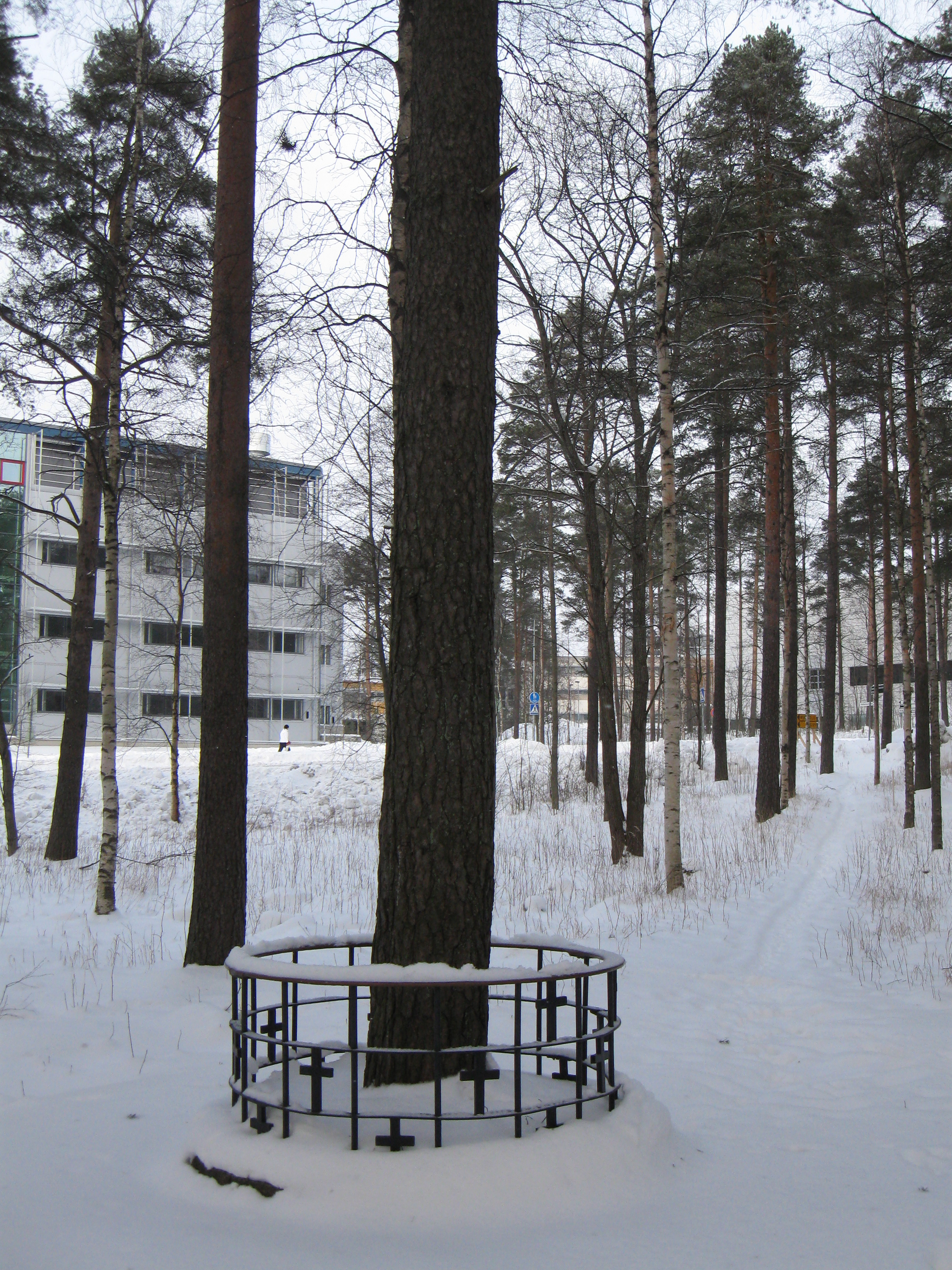
The presumed gallow tree of Taavetti Lukkarinen in Oulu

Today, Lukkarinen's gallow tree is located next to the current Oulu University of Applied Sciences' Department of Social and Health Care. The place is marked on the terrain. There is a fence around the supposed hanging tree with text describing the event. However, according to some estimates, the tree is not the same, but another tree would have been chosen instead.

== See also ==
- Arndt Pekurinen
