= Ruottala =

- Village
- Location in Finland
- Coordinates: 65°51′N 24°30′E
- Country: Finland
- Province: Lapland
- Municipality: Keminmaa, Tornio

Ruottala is a village in the municipality of Keminmaa and Tornio in Lapland in north-western Finland. For few years there was a motor event during summer every second year called "Oikea Moottoritapahtuma", which was arranged by a club called Konevoimayhdistys.
