= Tahvo Putkonen =

Finnish farmhand and murderer

Tahvo Putkonen (30 October 1795 in Suonenjoki, Finland – 8 July 1825 in Pieksämäki) was a Finnish farmhand, who killed tenant farmer Lasse Hirvonen on 26 December 1822 during the Finnish grand duchy period in Pieksämäki. He was sentenced to death on 30 July 1823. He made numerous appeals all the way to the Emperor, but was each time denied pardon. On 8 July 1825 Putkonen was beheaded. His execution is believed to be the last example of capital punishment being carried out in Finland during peacetime.

== Background ==
According to preserved court and church documents from the National Archives, the killing took place on Boxing Day, 1822 when Putkonen was celebrating his name day in the village of Jauhomäki, Pieksämäki at his landlord's house. He had invited neighbors over, and was serving food and hard liquor to the guests. Putkonen was drunk, and had apparently been so earlier over the Christmas holidays as well.

=== Murder ===
Mr. Lasse Hirvonen, a father of five, had joined Putkonen's party. At some point, apparently angered by Hirvonen's dining manners, Putkonen unexpectedly attacked Hirvonen and shoved him on the floor. Other guests separated Putkonen and pushed him out of the house. There, Putkonen tried to grab an axe, but Hirvonen's brother-in-law managed to tame him.

After some time Putkonen was let back into the house. He was still angered, and after noticing Hirvonen, he fetched a meter-long piece of birch firewood from outside. Hirvonen was lighting up his pipe at the time of the attack, so he didn't see Putkonen hitting him to the forehead with the log. Unconscious, Hirvonen collapsed on the floor, blood flowing from his ears and nose. He never woke up, and died two days later.

== Trial ==
At first Putkonen admitted his guilt, trying to even offer money in reparation at the scene of the events. Two witnesses testified that they didn't see the actual attack, but heard a noise and saw Hirvonen falling, with Putkonen holding the piece of log in his hand. Putkonen tried to claim later that he had acted in self-defense and that other guests had attacked Hirvonen as well.

== Verdict and execution ==
Tahvo Putkonen was sentenced to death. Additionally, he was fined 24 silver thalers for contempt of court, public intoxication and disturbing the holiday peace. Despite appeals to the Court of Appeals and challenging the witnesses, he was executed with an axe on 8 July 1825, over two and half years after his crime.

Although Putkonen was the last person to receive capital punishment, there was such a long period from the crime and his sentencing to the execution, that he is not the last known person to be sentenced to death during peacetime, nor to commit a peacetime crime that led to a death penalty. Abraham Kaipainen is the last known person to commit a peacetime crime that led to a death penalty (murdering his brother on 31 July 1823 in Pieksämäki) and to be sentenced to death by a non-martial court (27 November 1823). Kaipainen was executed on 30 October 1824.
