= Kemijärvi railway station =

Railway station in Kemijärvi, Finland

Kemijärvi
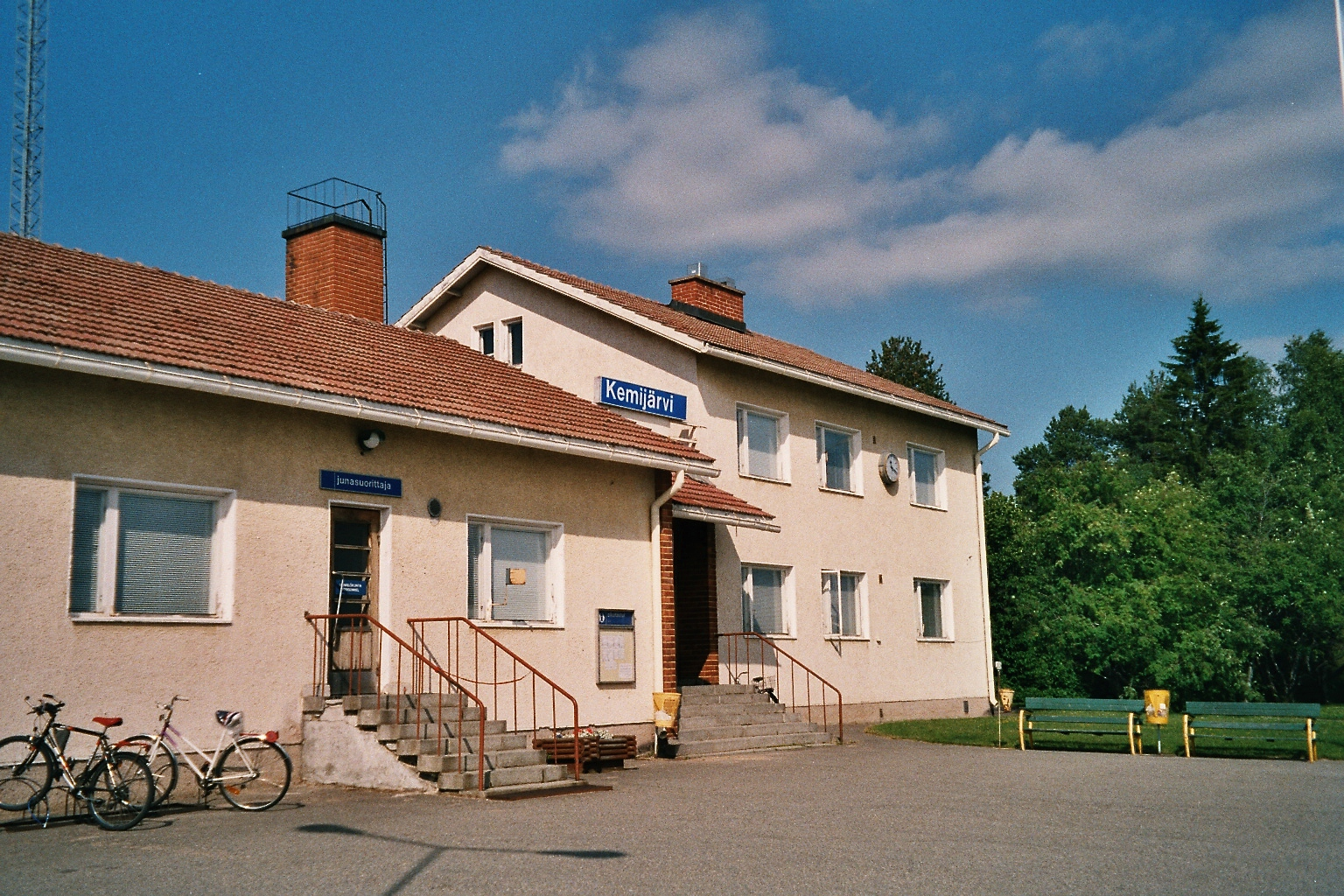

General information
- Location: Asematie 4, 98120 Kemijärvi
- Coordinates: 66°43′25″N 027°24′14″E
- System: VR Group station
- Owner: Finnish Transport Agency
- Platforms: 1

Construction
- Structure type: ground station

History
- Opened: 1934
- Electrified: 2014
Location

Kemijärvi railway station is a railway station located in Kemijärvi, Finland. It was opened in 1934 when the railway was extended from Rovaniemi to Kemijärvi. It is operated by the VR Group (the Finnish State Railways), and maintained by RHK, the Finnish Transport Agency.

In September 2006, the station was closed when the direct overnight train service between Kemijärvi and Helsinki was withdrawn, with VR stating that its new sleeping car trains could not operate with the diesel locomotives needed for the non-electrified railway north of Rovaniemi. However, in March 2008, the service was restored using a generator car that could provide hotel power behind a diesel. On 11 March 2014, electrification reached the station from Rovaniemi, allowing seamless service to Helsinki and making Kemijärvi the northernmost electrified point of the Finnish railway system.

At the end of winter 2014, VR was operating one daily overnight passenger train (with sleeping cars) from Kemijärvi to and from Helsinki Central railway station. For the 2024-2025 winter holiday season a weekly day train is run as a continuation from Rovaniemi. This extension was funded by Kemijärvi and neighbouring munincipalities.

The railway extends beyond Kemijärvi to Salla, but the segment between Isokylä and Salla was closed in December 2012. There are plans, however, to reopen the line and continue it all the way to Murmansk as the Northeast Passage opens to traffic.

The station building in Kemijärvi, a centrally heated brick structure with a total volume of 2,200 cubic metres (78,000 cu ft), was constructed in 1954–55. Its rooms originally intended for use by passenger services include a waiting room, café and post office; its staff amenities include a pair of offices and personal rooms for use by the train dispatcher and stationmaster, a break room, and an apartment for use by a janitor. The building bears a resemblance to that of Rovaniemi, built earlier in 1952–53.
