= Mia Laiho =

Finnish politician

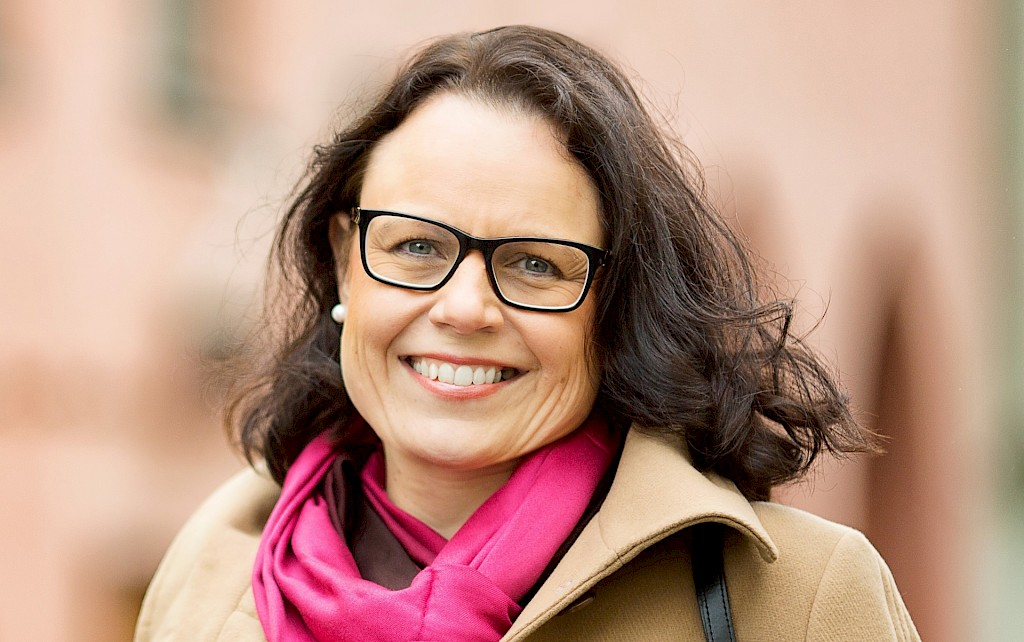

Member of the Finnish Parliament for Uusimaa

Personal details
- Party: National Coalition Party

Mia Kaarina Laiho is a Finnish politician currently serving in the Parliament of Finland for the National Coalition Party at the Uusimaa constituency.
