= Maula =

- Village
- Location in Finland Maula (Lapland)
- Coordinates: 65.893°N 24.694°E
- Country: Finland
- Province: Lapland
- Municipality: Keminmaa

Maula is a village in the municipality of Keminmaa in Lapland in north-western Finland.
