= Lautiosaari =

Village in Finland

- Village
- Location in Finland
- Coordinates: 65°48′N 24°35′E
- Country: Finland
- Region: Lapland
- Municipality: Keminmaa

Lautiosaari is a village in the municipality of Keminmaa in Lapland in north-western Finland.

== See also ==
- Lautiosaari (railway junction)
