= Arndt Pekurinen =

Finnish pacifist

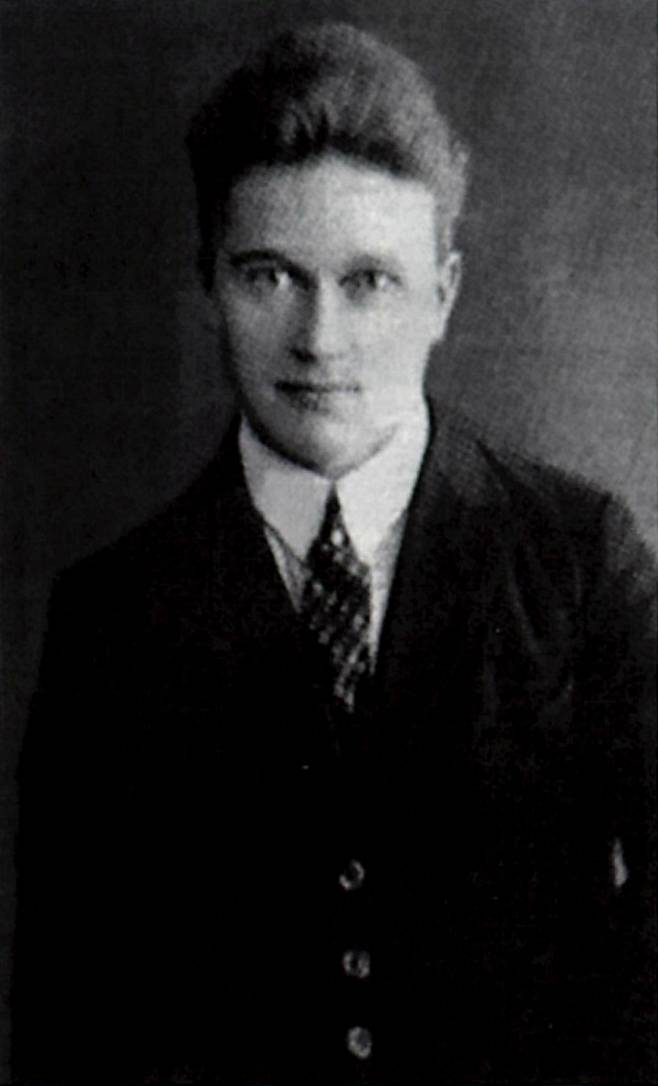
- Born: Arndt Juho Pekurinen; 29 August 1905; Juva, Finland
- Died: 5 November 1941 (aged 36); Karelia
- Cause of death: Executed
- Resting place: Malmi cemetery, Helsinki; 60.2359°N 25.0273°E

Arndt Juho Pekurinen (29 August 1905 – 5 November 1941) was a Finnish pacifist and conscientious objector.

In 1926, Pekurinen repeatedly refused mandatory conscription, leading to his imprisonment between 1929 and 1931. He refused to either wear a uniform or take arms. While Pekurinen was deeply religious, his motives were not based on his faith. His contemporaries suggested he was a communist, but he was not interested in politics. Because of his pacifist conviction, in the atmosphere of the tense 1930s, he was deemed as guilty of high treason, and the Lapua Movement harassed him relentlessly. In 1930, an international petition on his behalf was sent to the Finnish defense minister Juho Niukkanen, which included the signatures of sixty British MPs and notables such as Albert Einstein, Henri Barbusse and H. G. Wells. On 14 April 1931, the Lex Pekurinen, Finland's first alternative to military service, was passed. However, its provisions extended only as far as peacetime.

When the Winter War broke out in 1939, Pekurinen once again found himself imprisoned. At the onset of the Continuation War in autumn 1941, he was sent to the front, with orders to make sure he did wear the uniform, and bear and use a weapon. At the front he still refused to wear a uniform or bear arms. Following an order issued by captain Pentti Valkonen, he was executed without trial. The first two soldiers (sergeant Kivelä and private Kinnunen) ordered to execute him refused; only the third, corporal Asikainen, obeyed Valkonen's direct order.

After the war, an investigation of Pekurinen's death was launched but never completed. He remained effectively forgotten for over fifty years, until the publication in 1998 of the book Courage: The life and execution of Arndt Pekurinen by Erno Paasilinna. The city of Helsinki named a park Arndt Pekurisen puisto (Arndt Pekurinen Park) in East Pasila in his memory.

According to the book by Paasilinna, Pekurinen's motto was inspired by Jonathan Swift: "As people are not eaten, butchering them is of no use." ("Kun ihmisiä ei syödä, on niitä turha teurastaa.")

== See also ==
- Taavetti Lukkarinen
