= Rovaniemi railway station =

Railway station in Rovaniemi, Finland

Rovaniemi
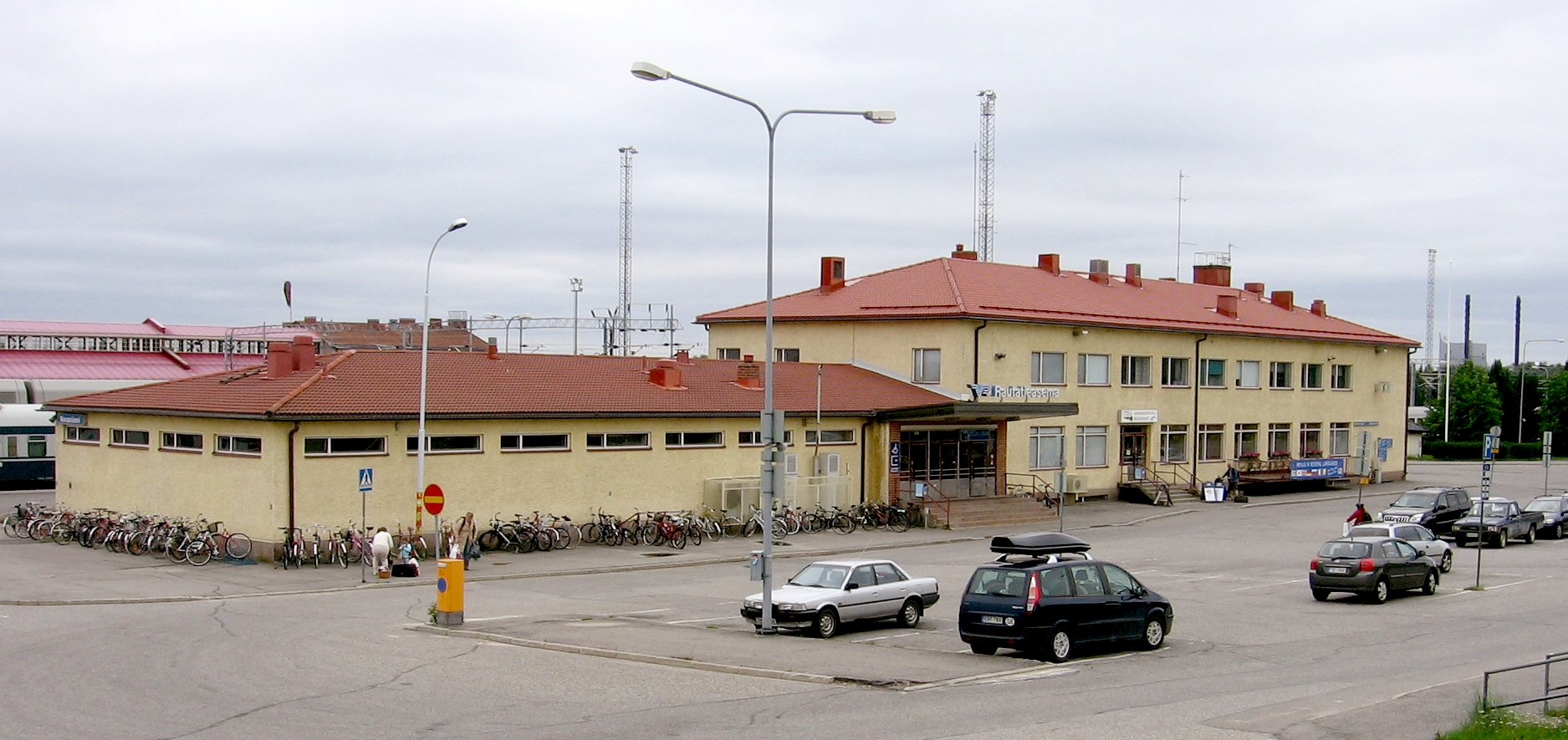

General information
- Location: Ratakatu 3 96100 Rovaniemi
- Coordinates: 66.49803°N 25.70731°E
- System: VR Group station
- Owner: Finnish Transport Agency
- Platforms: 3
- Tracks: 11

Construction
- Structure type: ground station

History
- Opened: 1909, 1934
- Electrified: 2004

Services
Preceding station	VR Group	Following station
Muurola towards Oulu	Oulu–Rovaniemi	Terminus
Location

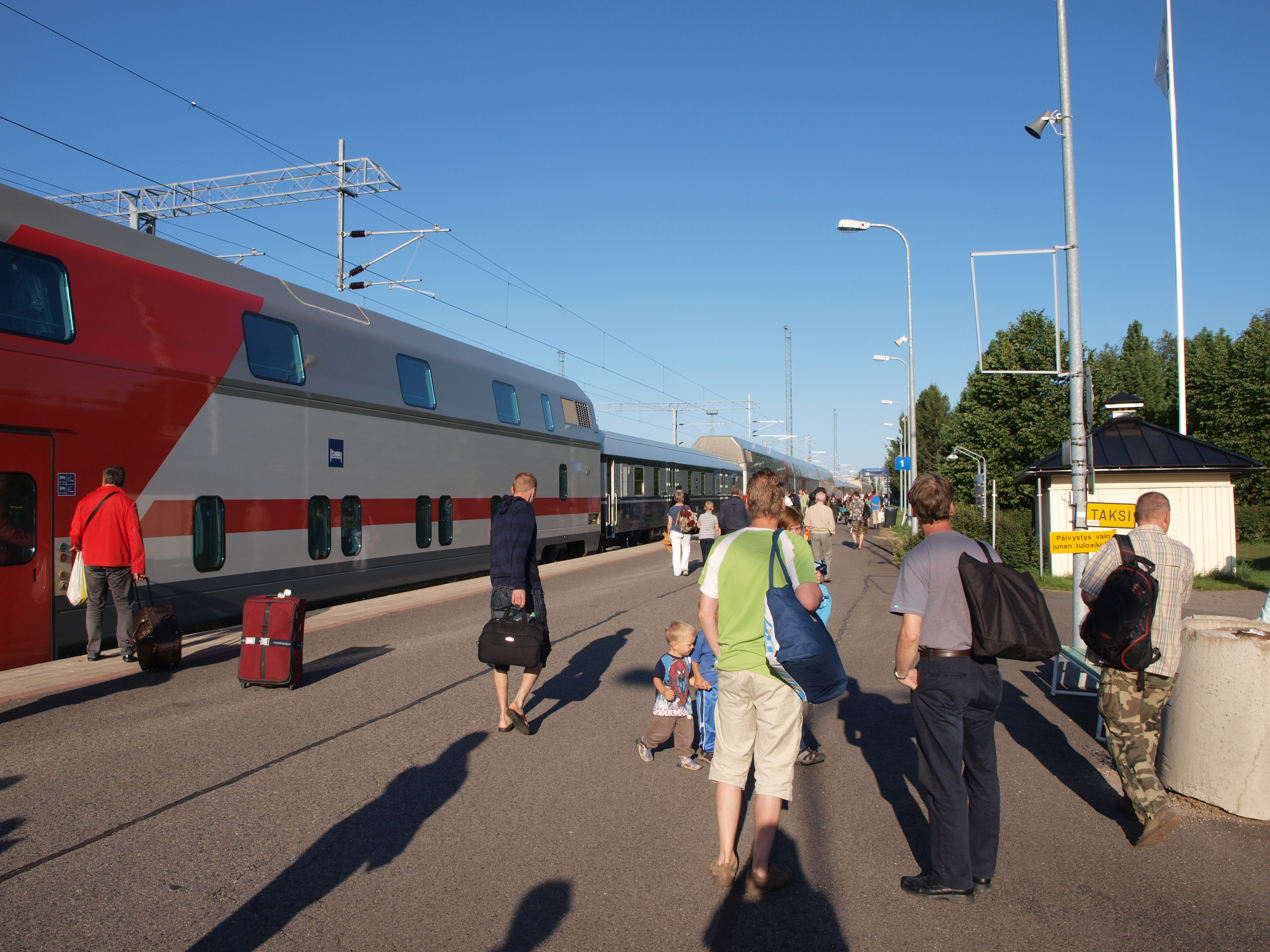
This train has arrived at Rovaniemi railway station in early morning, having left Helsinki railway station on the previous evening.

Rovaniemi railway station is located in Rovaniemi, Finland. The line from the south opened in 1909, and was extended to Kemijärvi in 1934. It features direct daytime and overnight passenger trains to Oulu, Tampere, Helsinki and Turku; as of March 2014 the overnight train provided the only passenger service north to Kemijärvi.

Electrification to Rovaniemi was completed in 2004 and extended to Kemijärvi in 2014, replacing diesel-hauled trains. The manual cane setting box was decommissioned on 21 May, 2006 and replaced with a computer interlocking device.

The current station building in Rovaniemi is a centrally heated brick structure with a total volume of 8,000 cubic metres (280,000 cu ft), and was constructed in 1952–53. Its rooms originally intended for use by passenger services include a waiting room, restaurant and post office; its staff amenities include a pair of offices and personal rooms for use by the train dispatcher and stationmaster, a break room, and an apartment for use by a janitor. Additionally, the basement level was dedicated to housing electronics such as communications devices. The building bears a resemblance to that of Kemijärvi, built later in 1954–55.

== Departure tracks ==
Rovaniemi railway station has three platform tracks. All passenger trains that depart from the station currently use track 1. Tracks 2 and 3 are used by some trains that terminate at the station.
