= Kemi =

Kemi Giepma Kiemâ Ǩeeʹmm
- Town
- Kemin kaupunki Kemi stad
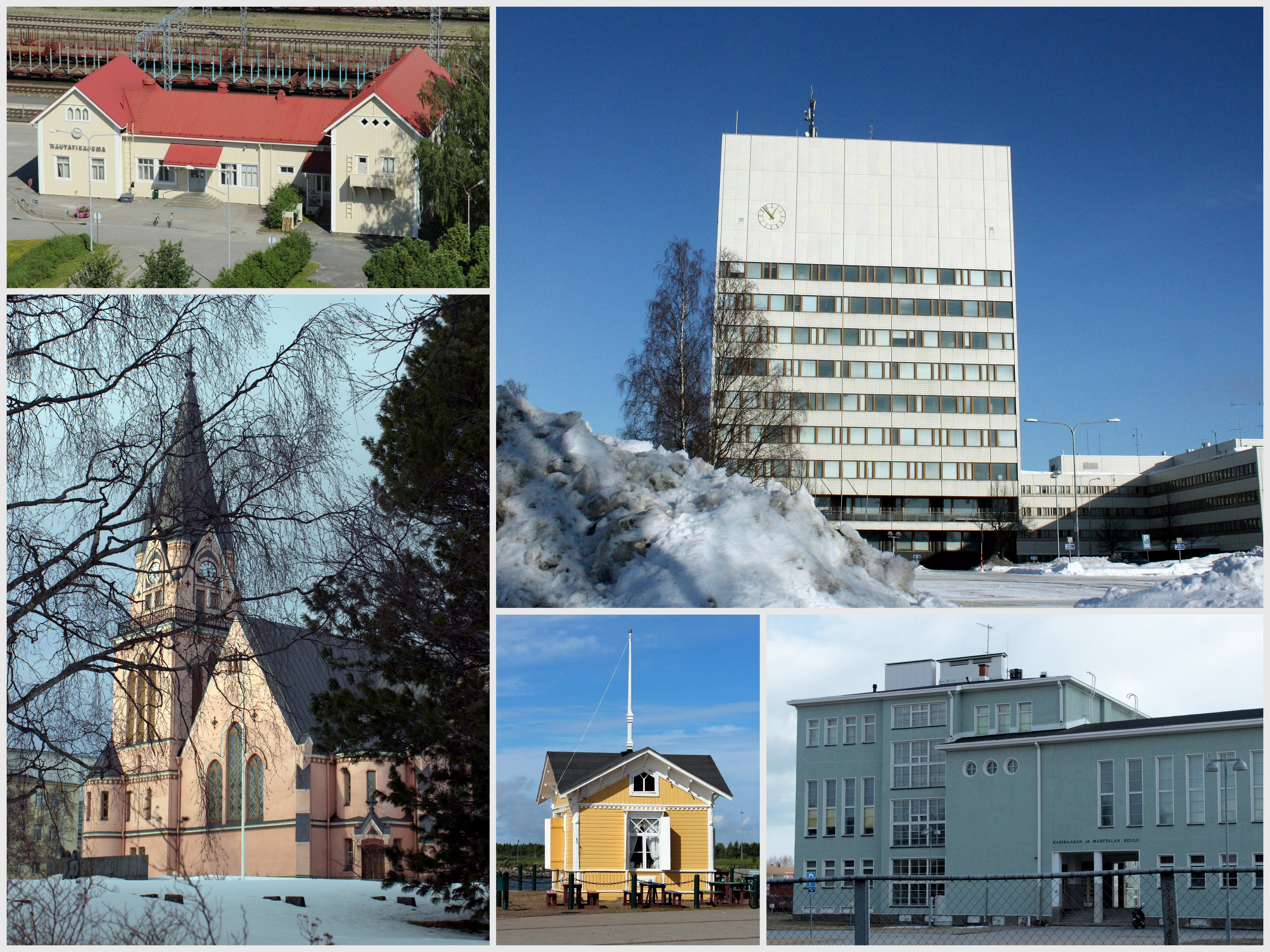
- Clockwise, from top left: Kemi Railway Station, Kemi City Hall, Karihaara School, Café at the inner harbour, and Kemi Church

- Coat of arms
- Nickname: Monaco of Finland
- Location of Kemi in Finland
- Interactive map of Kemi
- Coordinates: 65°44′10″N 024°33′49″E
- Country: Finland
- Region: Lapland
- Sub-region: Kemi–Tornio
- Charter: 1869

Government
  - Town manager: Matti Ruotsalainen

Area (2018-01-01)
  - Total: 747.28 km^{2} (288.53 sq mi)
  - Land: 95.38 km^{2} (36.83 sq mi)
  - Water: 652.1 km^{2} (251.8 sq mi)
  - Rank: 300th largest in Finland
- Elevation: 4 m (13 ft)

Population (2025-12-31)
  - Total: 19,339
  - Rank: 60th largest in Finland
  - Density: 202.76/km^{2} (525.1/sq mi)

Population by native language
  - Finnish: 92.4% (official)
  - Swedish: 0.2%
  - Others: 7.5%

Population by age
  - 0 to 14: 14.4%
  - 15 to 64: 57.2%
  - 65 or older: 28.4%
- Time zone: UTC+02:00 (EET)
  - Summer (DST): UTC+03:00 (EEST)
- Postal code: 94100
- Website: www.kemi.fi/en/

Kemi (Finnish: [ˈkemi]; Northern Sami: Giepma [ˈkie̯pma]; Inari Sami: Kiemâ; Skolt Sami: Ǩeeʹmm) is a town and municipality of Finland. It is located approximately 30 kilometres (19 mi) from the city of Tornio and the Swedish border. The distance to Oulu is 105 kilometres (65 mi) to the south and to Rovaniemi is 117 kilometres (73 mi) to the northeast. It was founded in 1869 by a decree of the Emperor Alexander II of Russia because of its proximity to a deepwater port.

The town has a population of 19,339 (31 December 2025) and covers an area of 747.28 km^{2} (288.53 sq mi) of which 652.1 square kilometers (251.8 sq mi) are water. The population density is 202.76 inhabitants per square kilometre (525.1/sq mi).

According to current statistics, Kemi has the highest number of drug crimes than any other town in Finland. This is thought to be due to its proximity to the Swedish border and the drug smuggling that occurs across it.

== History ==
=== World War II hostage crisis ===
During World War II, after Finland signed the Moscow Armistice and found itself involved in the Lapland War against its former German ally, German forces at the beginning of October 1944 captured 132 Finnish civilian hostages in Kemi (as well as 130 in Rovaniemi) and threatened to kill them unless the Finnish army released the German POWs captured in the Battle of Tornio. However, Finland refused to comply and threatened to retaliate by killing the German POWs. The hostages were released unharmed on October 11, 1944, near Rovaniemi.

== Geography ==
Kemi is situated on the Bothnian Bay, at the mouth of the river Kemijoki, and it is part of the Lapland region.

=== Climate ===
The climate type of Kemi is a typical subarctic climate (Köppen Dfc). It is characterized by long, cold winters and warm, short summers; but because it is on the coast of the Gulf of Bothnia, the characteristics of its continental climate are not as pronounced as inland areas.

Climate data for Kemi (Kemi-Tornio Airport, 1991–2020 normals, records 1959–present)
Month	Jan	Feb	Mar	Apr	May	Jun	Jul	Aug	Sep	Oct	Nov	Dec	Year
Record high °C (°F)	8.8 (47.8)	7.7 (45.9)	9.6 (49.3)	18.3 (64.9)	28.1 (82.6)	31.4 (88.5)	32.9 (91.2)	31.0 (87.8)	23.7 (74.7)	15.9 (60.6)	10.0 (50.0)	7.0 (44.6)	32.9 (91.2)
Mean maximum °C (°F)	2.8 (37.0)	3.1 (37.6)	5.9 (42.6)	11.8 (53.2)	21.1 (70.0)	24.7 (76.5)	26.5 (79.7)	24.3 (75.7)	18.1 (64.6)	11.4 (52.5)	6.2 (43.2)	3.5 (38.3)	27.3 (81.1)
Mean daily maximum °C (°F)	−5.7 (21.7)	−5.7 (21.7)	−0.9 (30.4)	4.4 (39.9)	11.4 (52.5)	17.2 (63.0)	20.6 (69.1)	18.0 (64.4)	12.6 (54.7)	5.2 (41.4)	0.3 (32.5)	−3.0 (26.6)	6.2 (43.2)
Daily mean °C (°F)	−9.6 (14.7)	−9.7 (14.5)	−5.4 (22.3)	0.4 (32.7)	6.8 (44.2)	12.8 (55.0)	16.0 (60.8)	13.9 (57.0)	8.8 (47.8)	2.4 (36.3)	−2.6 (27.3)	−6.6 (20.1)	2.3 (36.1)
Mean daily minimum °C (°F)	−14.1 (6.6)	−14.4 (6.1)	−10.3 (13.5)	−3.9 (25.0)	1.5 (34.7)	7.3 (45.1)	11.0 (51.8)	9.1 (48.4)	4.7 (40.5)	−1.0 (30.2)	−5.5 (22.1)	−10.4 (13.3)	−2.2 (28.1)
Mean minimum °C (°F)	−28.1 (−18.6)	−28.1 (−18.6)	−23.2 (−9.8)	−13.7 (7.3)	−4.4 (24.1)	0.8 (33.4)	4.6 (40.3)	1.0 (33.8)	−3.3 (26.1)	−11.8 (10.8)	−16.8 (1.8)	−23.6 (−10.5)	−30.5 (−22.9)
Record low °C (°F)	−37.1 (−34.8)	−43.2 (−45.8)	−34.0 (−29.2)	−25.4 (−13.7)	−9.3 (15.3)	−3.4 (25.9)	1.4 (34.5)	−2.2 (28.0)	−9.8 (14.4)	−24.8 (−12.6)	−31.3 (−24.3)	−36.7 (−34.1)	−43.2 (−45.8)
Average precipitation mm (inches)	32.3 (1.27)	25.8 (1.02)	28.7 (1.13)	26.4 (1.04)	30.3 (1.19)	39.2 (1.54)	52.2 (2.06)	63.4 (2.50)	58.1 (2.29)	59.9 (2.36)	44.8 (1.76)	33.0 (1.30)	494.1 (19.46)
Average precipitation days (≥ 0.1 mm)	25	22	21	16	14	15	15	16	17	21	24	24	230
Average relative humidity (%)	88	87	81	72	63	63	69	76	82	88	92	90	79
Source: FMI (Note: Climatological normals for Finland 1991–2020, Record highs and lows, Precipitation 1961–1990, Precipitation days)

Climate data for Kemi Ajos (1991–2020 normals, records 1993–present)
Month	Jan	Feb	Mar	Apr	May	Jun	Jul	Aug	Sep	Oct	Nov	Dec	Year
Record high °C (°F)	5.2 (41.4)	5.4 (41.7)	7.1 (44.8)	16.5 (61.7)	27.4 (81.3)	28.7 (83.7)	31.2 (88.2)	30.1 (86.2)	24.0 (75.2)	16.0 (60.8)	8.5 (47.3)	5.3 (41.5)	31.2 (88.2)
Mean daily maximum °C (°F)	−5.5 (22.1)	−5.9 (21.4)	−1.9 (28.6)	3.3 (37.9)	9.5 (49.1)	15.9 (60.6)	19.7 (67.5)	17.6 (63.7)	12.5 (54.5)	5.9 (42.6)	1.0 (33.8)	−2.7 (27.1)	5.8 (42.4)
Daily mean °C (°F)	−8.6 (16.5)	−9.2 (15.4)	−5.6 (21.9)	−0.3 (31.5)	5.7 (42.3)	12.7 (54.9)	16.4 (61.5)	14.9 (58.8)	10.1 (50.2)	3.8 (38.8)	−1.3 (29.7)	−5.1 (22.8)	2.8 (37.0)
Mean daily minimum °C (°F)	−12.5 (9.5)	−13.2 (8.2)	−9.8 (14.4)	−3.5 (25.7)	2.8 (37.0)	9.9 (49.8)	13.8 (56.8)	12.5 (54.5)	7.9 (46.2)	2.1 (35.8)	−3.3 (26.1)	−8.3 (17.1)	−0.1 (31.8)
Record low °C (°F)	−37.1 (−34.8)	−33.8 (−28.8)	−28.5 (−19.3)	−20.5 (−4.9)	−9.3 (15.3)	1.9 (35.4)	6.2 (43.2)	3.3 (37.9)	−1.8 (28.8)	−12.9 (8.8)	−23.3 (−9.9)	−30.2 (−22.4)	−37.1 (−34.8)
Source 1: https://www.ilmatieteenlaitos.fi/ilmastollinen-vertailukausi
Source 2: https://kilotavu.com/asema-taulukko.php?asema=101846

== Economy ==
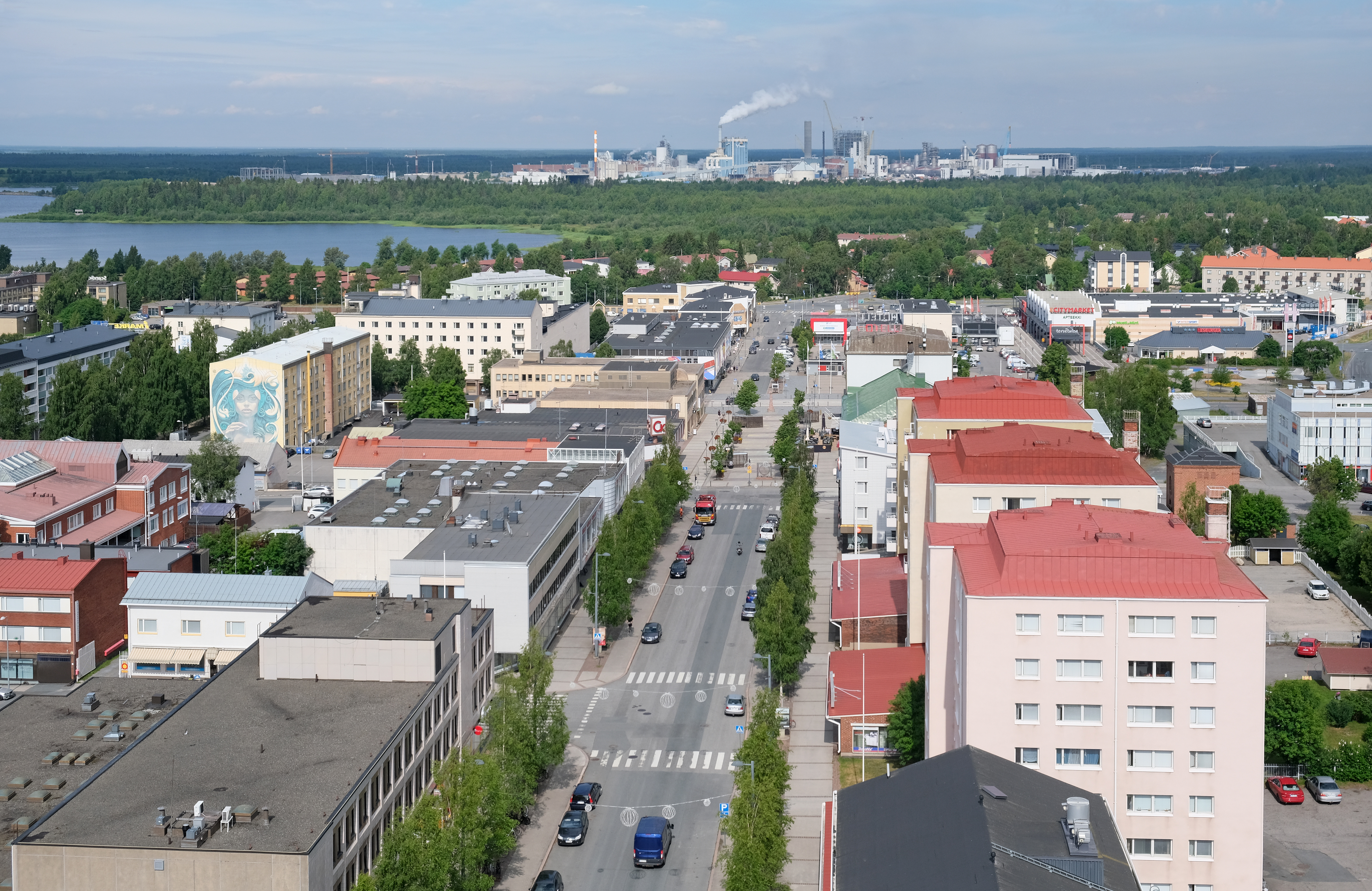
Valtakatu street seen from Kemi City Hall.

The main economic activity in Kemi is centered on two large paper and woodpulp mills and on the only chromium mine in Europe (which supplies the Outokumpu ferrochrome plant in Tornio).

In April 2007, the city of Kemi laid off all of its municipal workers for two weeks due to the failing economy of the city. Spiraling specialist healthcare costs and a fleeing industry tax base are stated as the cause for the firing. These are the most drastic temporary dismissals to take place in Finland since 2000.

== Sights ==
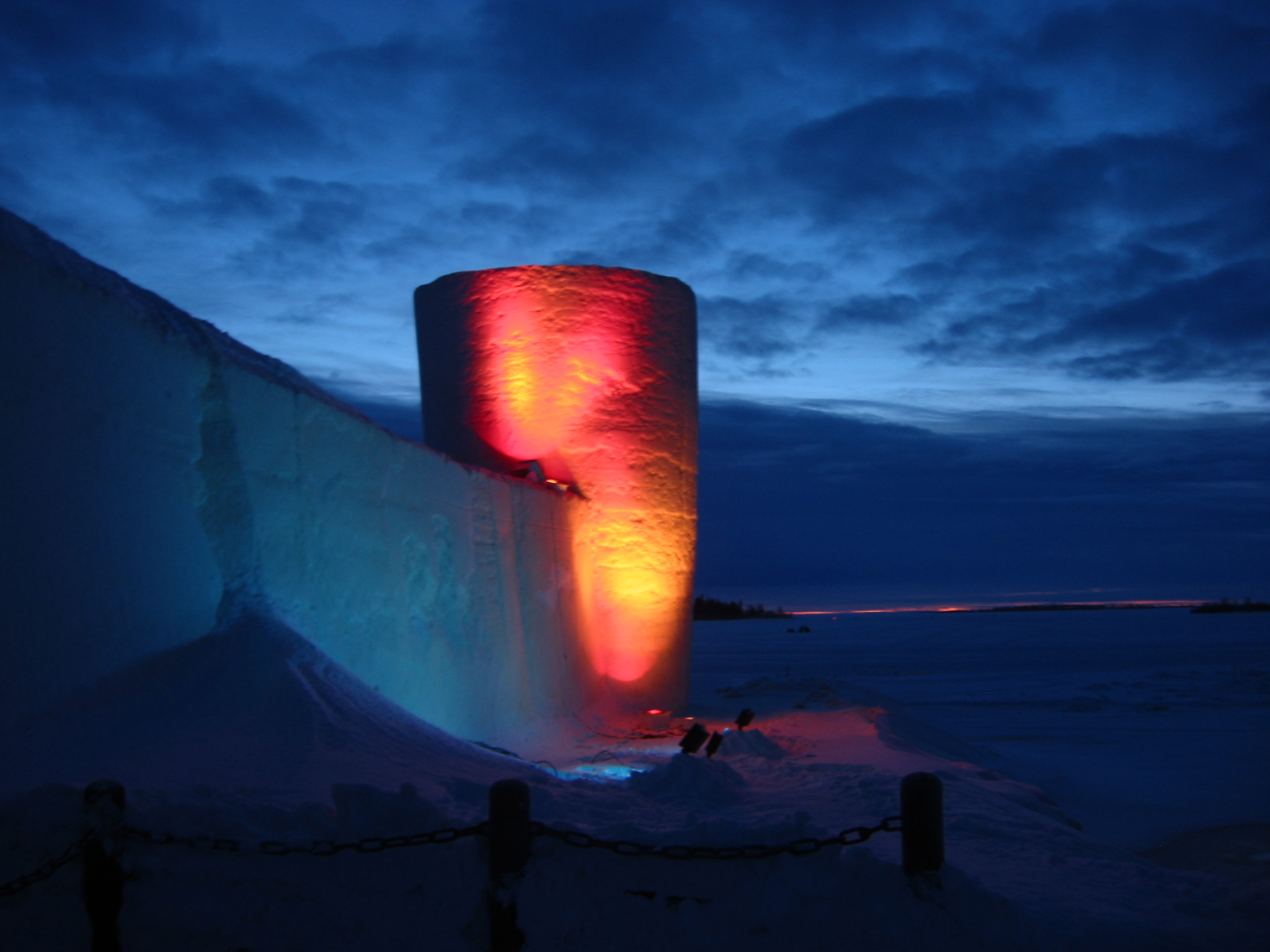
Kemi SnowCastle

Kemi has a claim to fame as the home of the world's largest snow castle (reconstructed every year to a different design). The SnowCastle of Kemi is usually built in the inner harbor of the city.

A model of The Crown of Finland (the original was never made for the King of Finland) is kept in the town's gemstone gallery. It also houses replicas of the Imperial State Crown of Great Britain, the scepter of the Czar of Russia, the Orbs of Denmark, and the diamond necklace of Marie Antoinette, among other items.

Additional attractions include:

- Kemi church
- Kemi Gemstone Gallery
- Icebreaker Sampo
- The sailship Jähti

== Culture ==
Kemi is the hometown of the power metal band Sonata Arctica.

== Politics ==
Results of the 2019 Finnish parliamentary election in Kemi:

- Left Alliance 26.2%
- Social Democratic Party 23.6%
- The Finns Party 19.8%
- Center Party 13.6%
- National Coalition Party 7.2%
- Green League 5.1%
- Movement Now 1.8%
- Christian Democrats 0.7%
- Communist Worker‘s Party - For Peace and Socialism 2,7%

=== Town manager ===
Town manager	Term
Olli Nylander	1930-1956
Risto Hölttä	1956-1966
Taisto Jokelainen	1967-1980
Juhani Leino	1980-2000
Kalervo Ukkola	2000-2005
Ossi Repo	2006-2012
Tero Nissinen	2012-2021
Matti Ruotsalainen	2021-

== Transportation ==
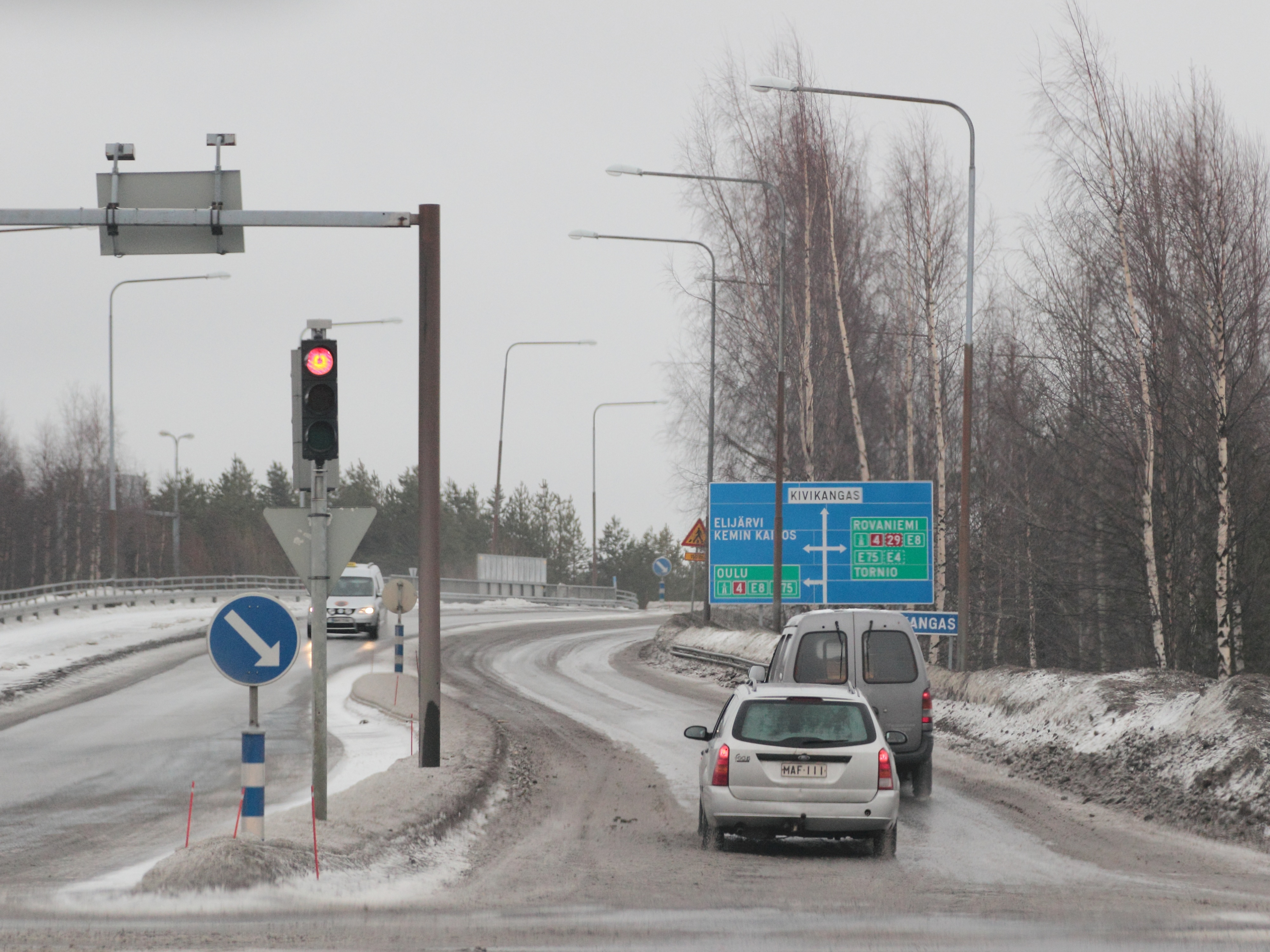
The Karihaaranväylä street and bridge over the National road 4 in Kemi

Kemi railway station is an intermediate station on the railway between Lapland and Helsinki. It is operated by VR. The junction of the Kolari and Rovaniemi lines lies to the north of Kemi station.

Finnish national road 4 and European routes E8 and E75 run through the town.

Kemi-Tornio Airport is located 4.5 kilometers (2.8 mi) north of Kemi city center.

The Port of Kemi is a cargo port handling containerised and bulk cargo as well as oil and petrochemical products.

== Education ==
A polytechnic university of applied sciences is situated in Kemi.

== Notable people ==
- Heikki Jauhopää (died 1586), Finnish cunning man executed for witchcraft
- Juhani Paasivirta (1919–1993), Finnish historian
- Ensio Seppänen (1924–2008), Finnish sculptor and professor
- Anna-Liisa Tiekso (1929–2010), Finnish politician
- Tony Kakko (1975-), Finnish musician and singer of Sonata Arctica

== International relations ==
=== Twin towns – sister cities ===
Kemi is twinned with:

- Tromsø (Norway), since 1940
- Volgograd (Russia), since 1953
- Liptovský Mikuláš (Slovakia)
- (United Kingdom) Newtownards (Northern Ireland)
- Székesfehérvár (Hungary)
- Luleå (Sweden)

== See also ==
- 1949 Kemi strike
