= Olavi Laiho =

Finnish soldier and Soviet spy; executed in 1944

Mauno Olavi Laiho
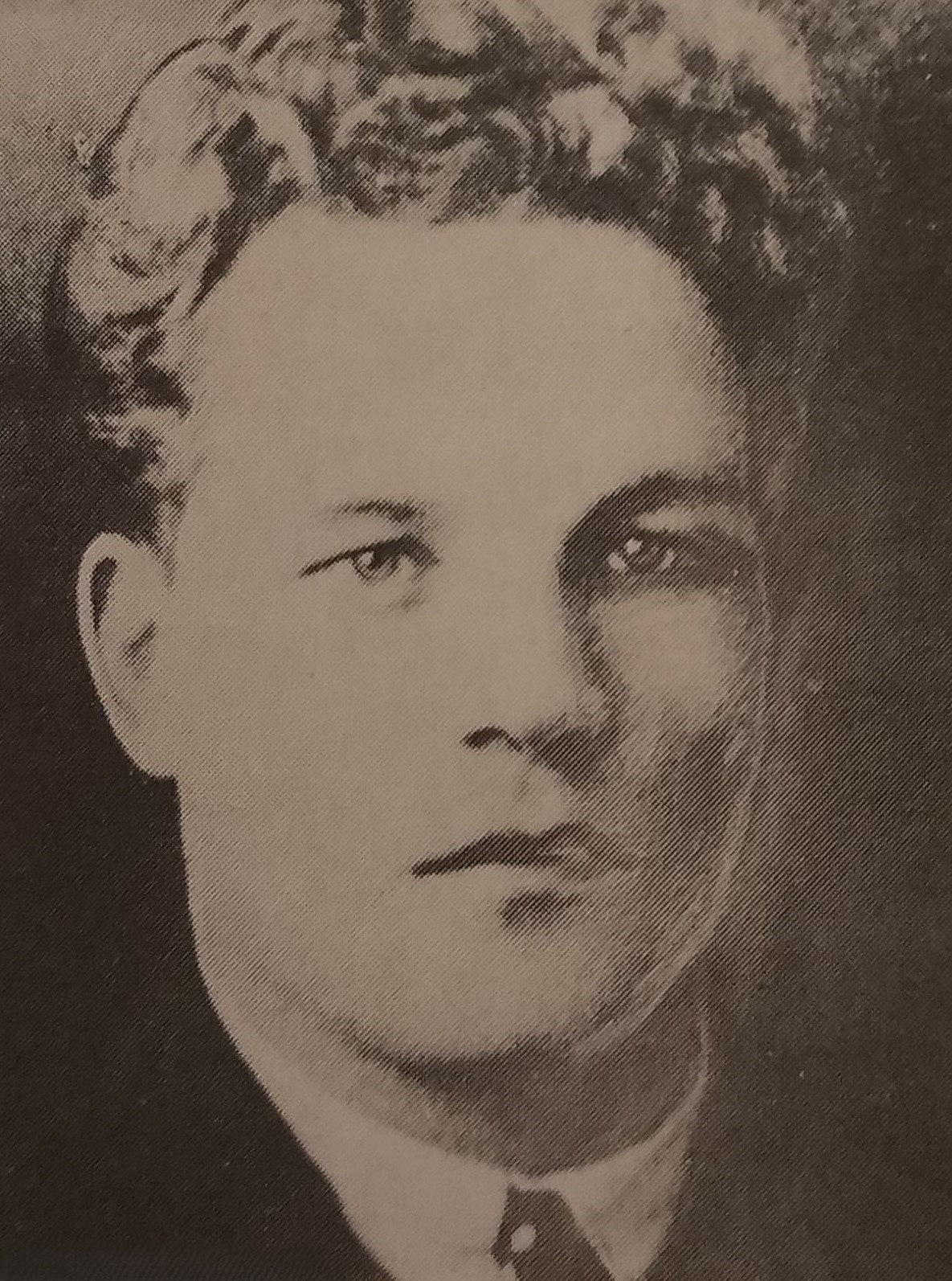
- Born: 27 October 1907; Halikko, Grand Duchy of Finland
- Died: 2 September 1944 (aged 36); Oulu, Finland
- Status: Executed by firing squad
- Convictions: High treason Espionage; Desertion
- Penalty: Death

Mauno Olavi Laiho (27 October 1907 – 2 September 1944) was the last Finn to be executed in Finland.

== Early life ==
Olavi Laiho was born the son of a farmhand in Halikko, Finland. He was introduced to communism very early on, and was an active member of the underground Finnish Communist Party. He moved to Turku, where he worked as a construction worker. Laiho was active in sports.

== Military service ==
During the Continuation War, Laiho was conscripted into the Finnish Army as a private. Laiho deserted and moved to a clandestine hideaway near Turku, where he worked actively as a spy for the Soviet Union and as an aide for other deserters.

== Capture, trial and execution ==
Laiho was caught in early 1944 and sentenced to death by military court for desertion, espionage and high treason. He was shot by military police firing squad on 2 September 1944 in Oulu, two days before the armistice. Although the Finnish Military Code mandated a death penalty for espionage and treason, it is likely Laiho's communist background ultimately influenced his sentence.

Laiho was the last Finn to be executed in Finland, and the last Finn to be executed for a military crime. A group of three Soviet infiltrators were shot on the following day for espionage. The armistice on 4 September 1944 put in place a moratorium on any further executions. In 1945, all death sentences were commuted to life imprisonment.

The death penalty for military crimes was abolished in Finland in 1972.
