= Port of Kemi =

Port in Kemi, Finland

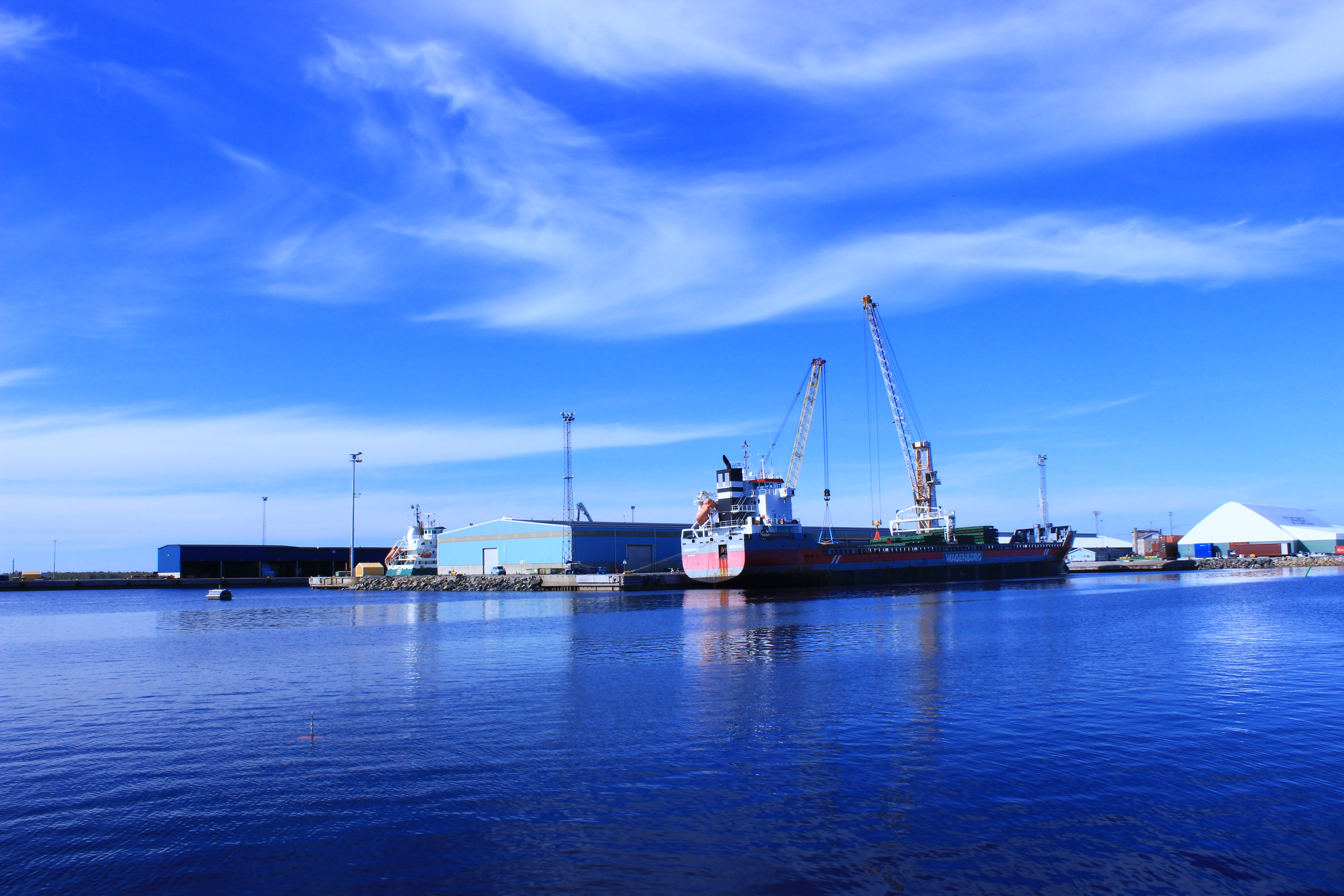
- Click on the map for a fullscreen view
- Port of Kemi (Finland)
- Native name: Kemin satama

Location
- Country: Finland
- Location: Kemi
- Coordinates: 65.663544°N 24.524021°E
- UN/LOCODE: FI KEM

Details
- Operated by: Kemin Satama Oy
- Owned by: City of Kemi
- Type of harbour: coastal breakwater
- Draft depth: max. 11.4 metres (37 ft) depth

Statistics
- Annual cargo tonnage: c. 1.9m tons (int'l) (2018)
- Website https://www.portofkemi.fi/en/

The Port of Kemi is a cargo port in the city of Kemi, Finland, on the northern shore of the Bothnian Bay.

The port comprises three facilities:

- Ajos harbour: the main facility at Kemi, handling both containerised and bulk cargo; four piers and 11 berths with RO-RO and side loading; depth 8.7–11.4 metres (29–37 ft)
- Veitsiluoto harbour: mostly used for the import and export needs of the adjacent Stora Enso papermill; seven berths; depth 6.8 metres (22 ft)
- Oil terminal: two crude oil, one light fuel oil and one chemicals pipeline

The annual international cargo throughput of the Port of Kemi was c. 1.9 million tons in 2018, consisting of slightly more exports than imports.

== See also ==
- Ports of the Baltic Sea
