= Rail transport in Finland =

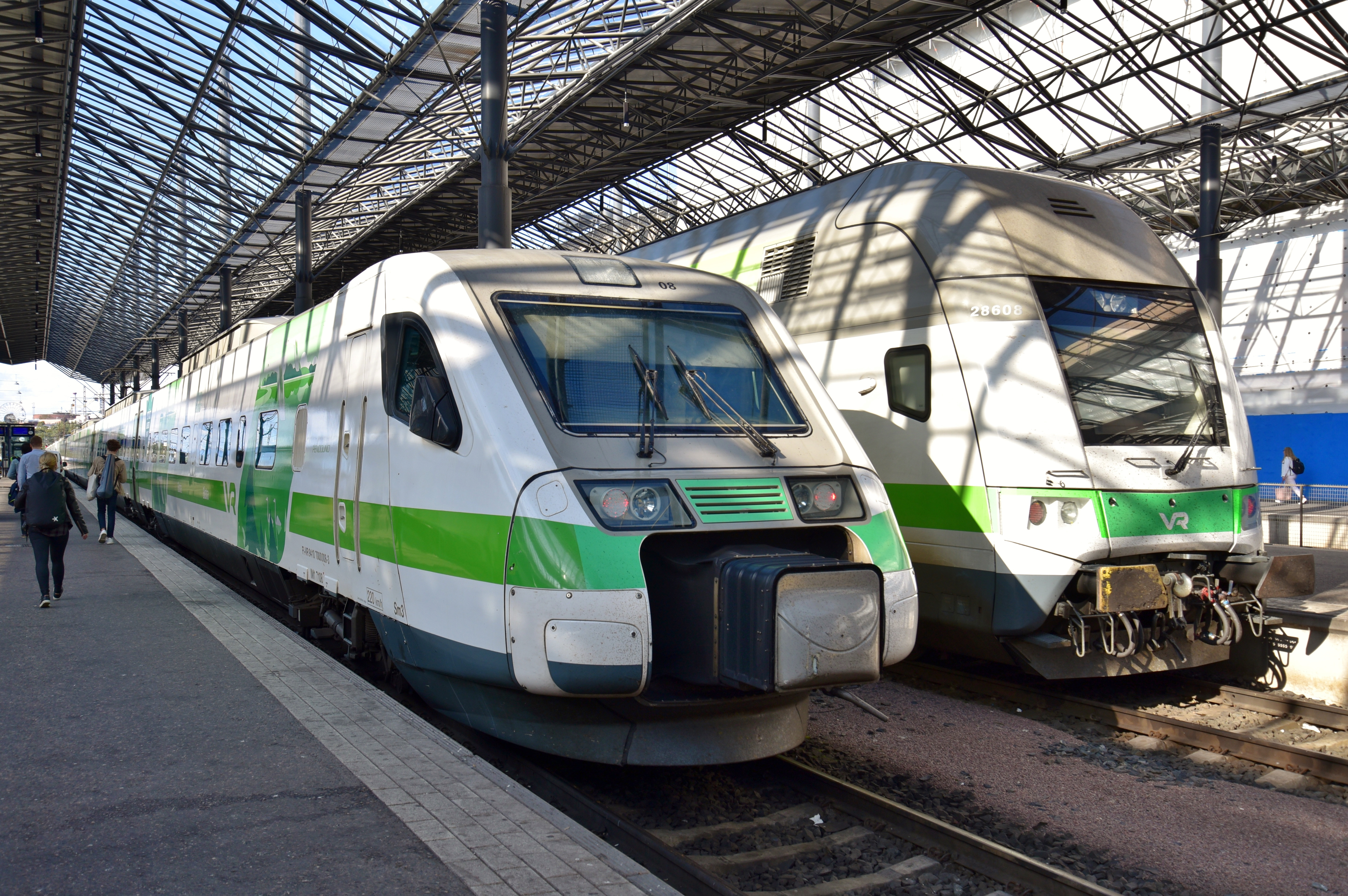
- Trains at Helsinki Central Station, 2019

Operation
- National railway: VR
- Infrastructure company: Finnish Transport Agency

Statistics
- Ridership: 14.9 million / year long-distance 77.9 million / year in Helsinki commuter traffic

System length
- Total: 9,216 km (5,727 mi)
- Electrified: 3,249 km (2,019 mi)

Track gauge
- Main: 1,524 mm (5 ft)

Electrification
- Main: 25 kV 50 Hz AC overhead wiring

Features
- Longest tunnel: Savio, 13.5 km (8.4 mi)
Map
- The Finnish railway network in 2010. Lines marked in green are freight- and passenger routes, brown are freight-only routes, blue is heritage railway, and grey are no longer in use.

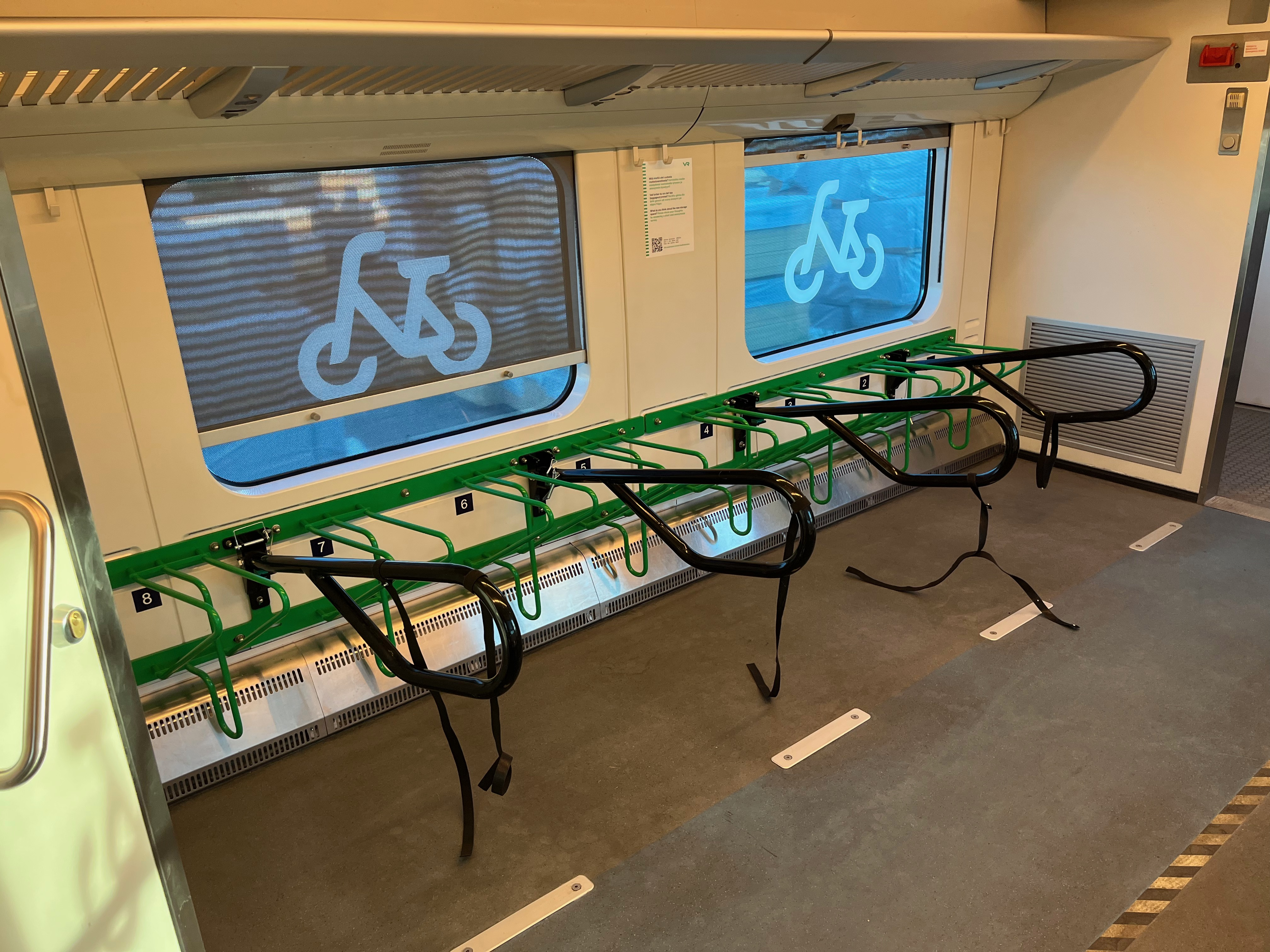
Bike storage space on a night train, June 2022

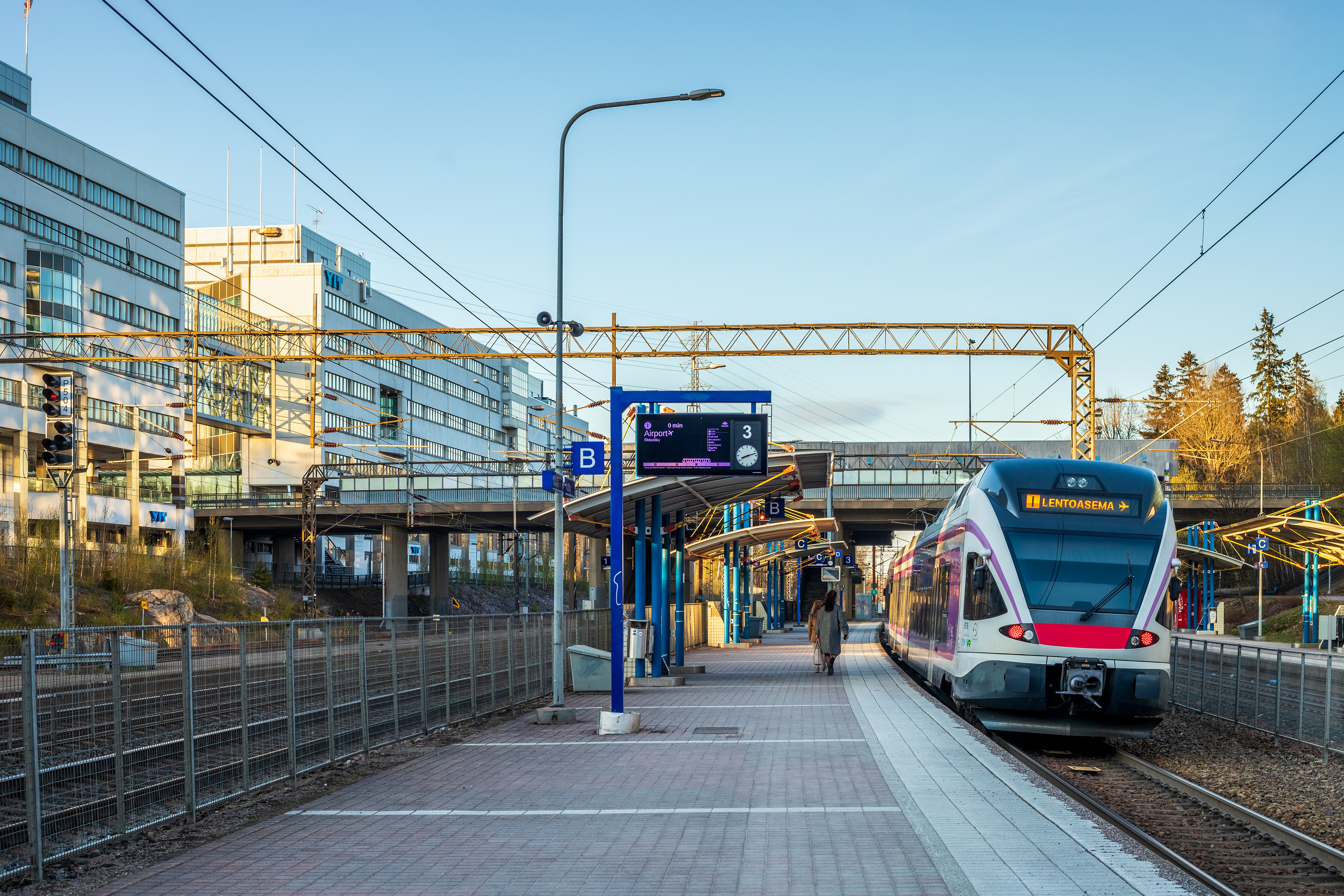
A commuter train bound for the airport

The Finnish railway network consists of a total track length of 9,216 km (5,727 mi). Railways in Finland are built with a broad 1,524 mm (5 ft) track gauge, of which 3,249 km (2,019 mi) is electrified. Passenger trains are operated by the state-owned enterprise VR that runs services on 7,225 km (4,489 mi) of track. These services cover all major cities and many rural areas, though the coverage is less than the coverage provided by the bus services. Most passenger train services originate or terminate at Helsinki Central railway station, and a large proportion of the passenger rail network radiates out of Helsinki. VR and other private operators also operate freight services. Maintenance and construction of the railway network itself is the responsibility of the Finnish Rail Administration, which is a part of the Finnish Transport Agency (Finnish: Väylävirasto, Swedish: Trafikledsverket). The network consists of six areal centres, that manage the use and maintenance of the routes in co-operation. Cargo yards and large stations may have their own signalling systems.

Since the population density is low in most parts of Finland, much of the country is not well suited to railways. Commuter services are nowadays rare outside the Helsinki area, but there are express train connections between most of the cities. As in France, passenger services are mostly connections from various parts of the country to the capital, Helsinki. Currently there are about 260 passenger round trips driven daily in Finland, excluding Helsinki commuter rail. Nightly passenger trains only operate on the busiest lines between Helsinki or Turku via Oulu to Lapland (minimum distance of 676 km (420 mi)), leaving most tracks free for nightly freight traffic (about 40 million tonnes per year). Rail service is supplemented by long-distance bus and airplane connections; buses are sometimes faster and/or cheaper than trains (e.g. Helsinki–Pori).

== History ==
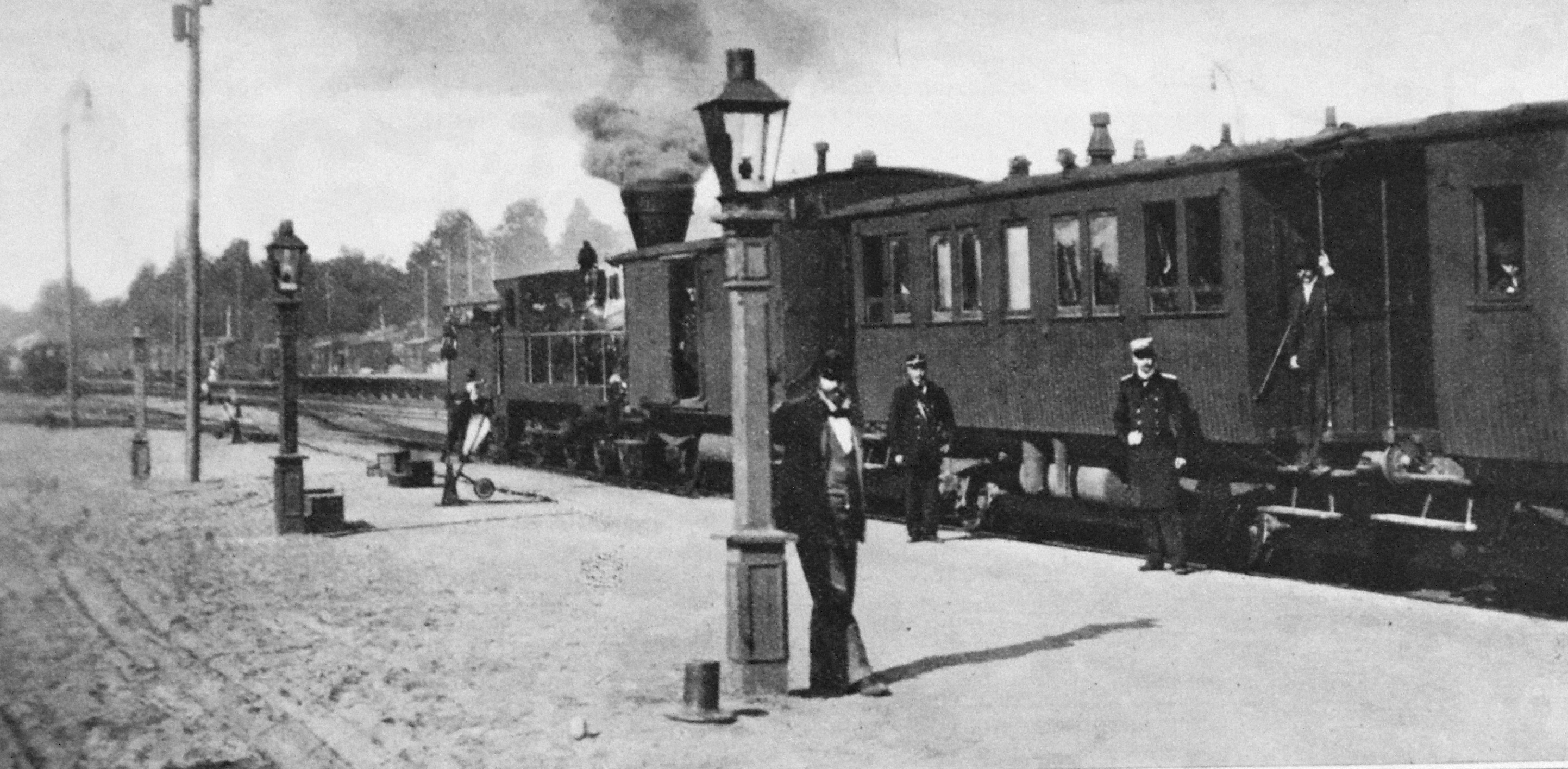
The local train at the first rail line in 1898

The first rail line between Helsinki and Hämeenlinna (today part of the Finnish Main Line) was opened on January 31, 1862. As Finland was then the Grand Duchy of Finland, an autonomous state that was ruled by the Imperial Russia, railways were built to the broad 1,524 mm (5 ft), that was used also in Imperial Russia back then. An extension from Riihimäki to the new Finland Station in Saint Petersburg was opened in 1870. However, the Finnish and Russian rail systems remained unconnected until 1912. Russian trains could not have used the Finnish rail network due to a narrower load gauge. Later the Finnish load gauge was widened to match the Russian load gauge, with hundreds of station platforms or tracks moved further apart from each other.

Further expansion occurred in the 1800s and by 1900 much of the network had been constructed with 3,300 km of track built.

The Finland Railway Bridge across the River Neva in Saint Petersburg, opened in 1912, connected the Finnish State Railways to Russian Railways. Following Finnish independence, the Russian part of the line was handed over to Russia.

All passenger rail connections with Russia ceased in March 2022 following the Russian invasion of Ukraine.

== Future expansion ==
=== Track upgrades ===
Track doubling projects are taking place in various sections of the Finnish rail network. Following a previous project to double the single-line sections of railway from Seinäjoki to Oulu which was completed in 2017, renovations started on the Luumäki–Imatra–Simpele section, double-tracking the Joutseno–Imatra section and improving capacity. The Luumäki–Imatra railway project was completed in 2024 at a cost of 210 million euros.

=== New lines ===
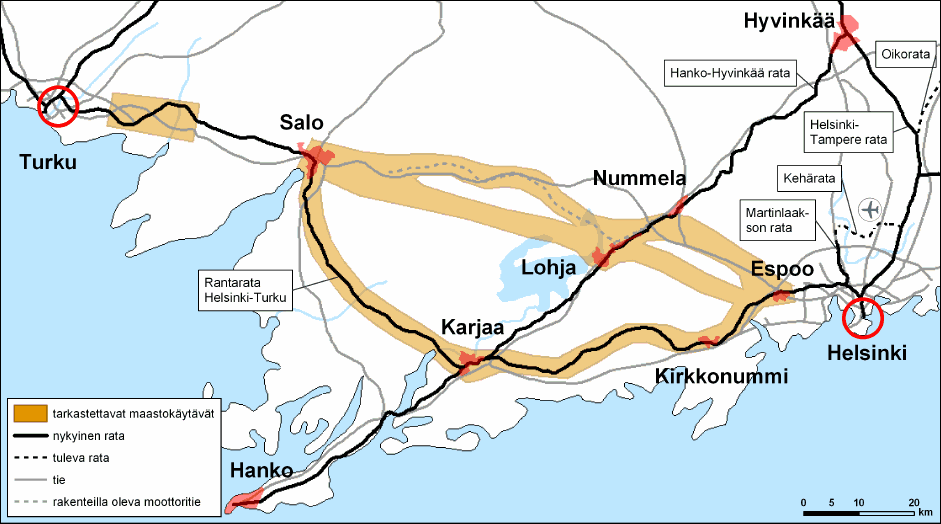
Different lines of the proposed new Helsinki–Turku railway line.

Since the 1970s the Finnish Transport Agency has been discussing the possibility of building a Helsinki–Turku high-speed railway, allowing for a faster journey time between the two cities. The Orpo Cabinet has decided to fund the segments from Turku to Salo as well as from Helsinki to Lohja, with the remaining segment between Lohja and Salo to be completed later.

The planned Itärata (East Rail) would link Helsinki and Kouvola via Porvoo, shortening journey times to eastern Finnish cities such as Kuopio and Joensuu. More direct lines from Helsinki to Pori and Jyväskylä have also been studied.

Proposals for a rail link to Lapland in northern Finland, via Kemijärvi or Kolari, from the Norwegian port of Kirkenes are in the planning stages. However, environmental and cultural sensitivities exist which affect these plans, with concerns from the indigenous Sámi people that the proposed line would pass through reindeer grazing lands.

=== Conversion to standard gauge ===
In 2022 the European Union proposed for all new rail lines to be constructed to standard gauge and for the gradual conversion of other gauges to the European standard gauge. At the time of the proposal, the Finnish and Estonian governments expressed criticism of this plan, including questioning the balance between cost/benefit.

In June 2024, the Ministry of Transport and Communications directed the Transport Agency to investigate the need, options and costs of expanding standard gauge network from Sweden into Finland. On 13 May 2025, Transport Minister Lulu Ranne announced that planning was underway to convert Finland's railways to standard gauge in line with EU regulations with work expected to commence north of Oulu sometime in the early 2030s at the earliest.

== Operators ==
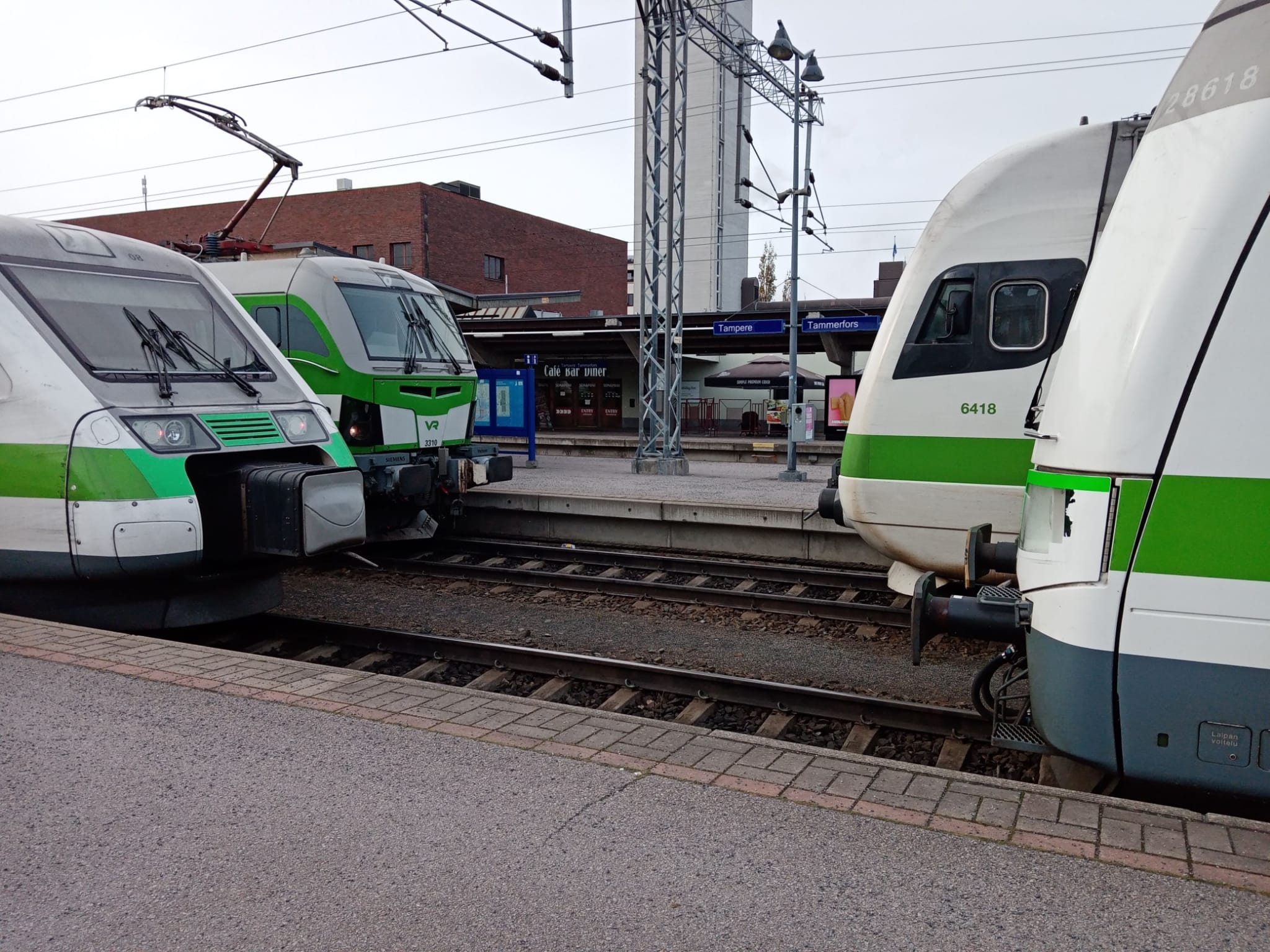
4 different train types in Tampere, Finland

The national railway company VR had a monopoly on passenger transport. In Helsinki local traffic, class Sm5 EMUs are owned by Pääkaupunkiseudun Junakalusto Oy, but are operated by VR.

While private rail operators can transport freight since 2007, most trains are still run by VR. Ratarahti Oy was granted its safety certificate by the Finnish Transport Safety Agency in September 2011 and it will start shunting work at the Imatra rail yard in 2013, with first test runs on 5 December 2012. Fenniarail Oy received its safety certificate in May 2011 and has started using used locomotives from Czech Republic, which were converted to the Finnish gauge of 1524mm, and started operation in July 2016.

Several museum railways operators exist that are unrelated to VR Group.

== Technical facts ==
=== Rail network size ===
- Total track length including sidings 9,216 km (5,727 mi)
- Total length of passenger railway routes 7,225 km (4,489 mi)
- Electrified routes 3,249 km (2,019 mi)

=== Electrification ===
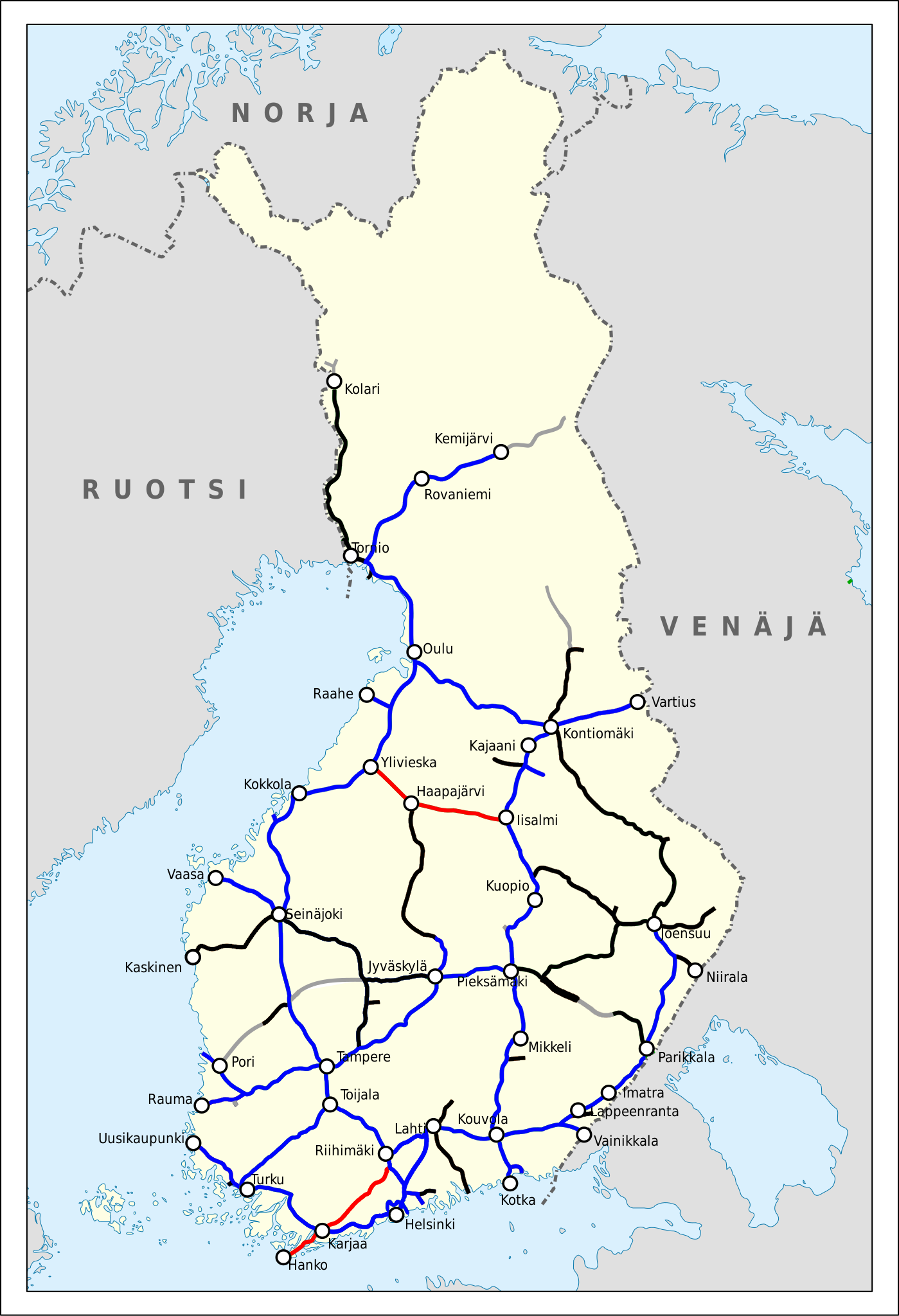
Electrification of Finnish railways in February 2022. Electrified track Electrification of track under construction Non-electrified track Disused track

While some private Finnish railways were electrified already at the end of the 19th century, work on the electrification of the main rail network started only in the late 1960s. Most main lines are now electrified. The system used is 25 kV 50 Hz AC overhead wiring, with wire height normal at 6.5 m (21 ft) and varying from 5.6 m (18 ft) beyond 6.5 m (21 ft) to 7.3 m (24 ft). The largest class of electric locomotives are the Sr1 locomotives that were taken into use in 1973. They are now supplemented by the Sr2- and Sr3-class electric locomotives and the high-speed Sm3 Pendolino units.

The first electric trains started to operate on 26 January 1969 in Helsinki local traffic, initially between Helsinki and Kirkkonummi and slowly extending to Riihimäki on 31 January 1972. Heading northwards, the electric wires reached Seinäjoki in 1975, Kokkola in 1981, Oulu in 1983, Rovaniemi in 2004, and their current northernmost point in Kemijärvi in 2014. In addition to the line to Kemijärvi, another line recently electrified was the line from Seinäjoki to Vaasa in 2011.

The next railway line to be electrified was the railway from Turku to Uusikaupunki, which was completed by February 2022.

The electrification projects of the connection between Finland and Sweden, including the Torne River Railway Bridge, as well as the Hanko–Hyvinkää railway in southern Finland, were completed in the winter of 2024–2025.

=== Running speeds ===
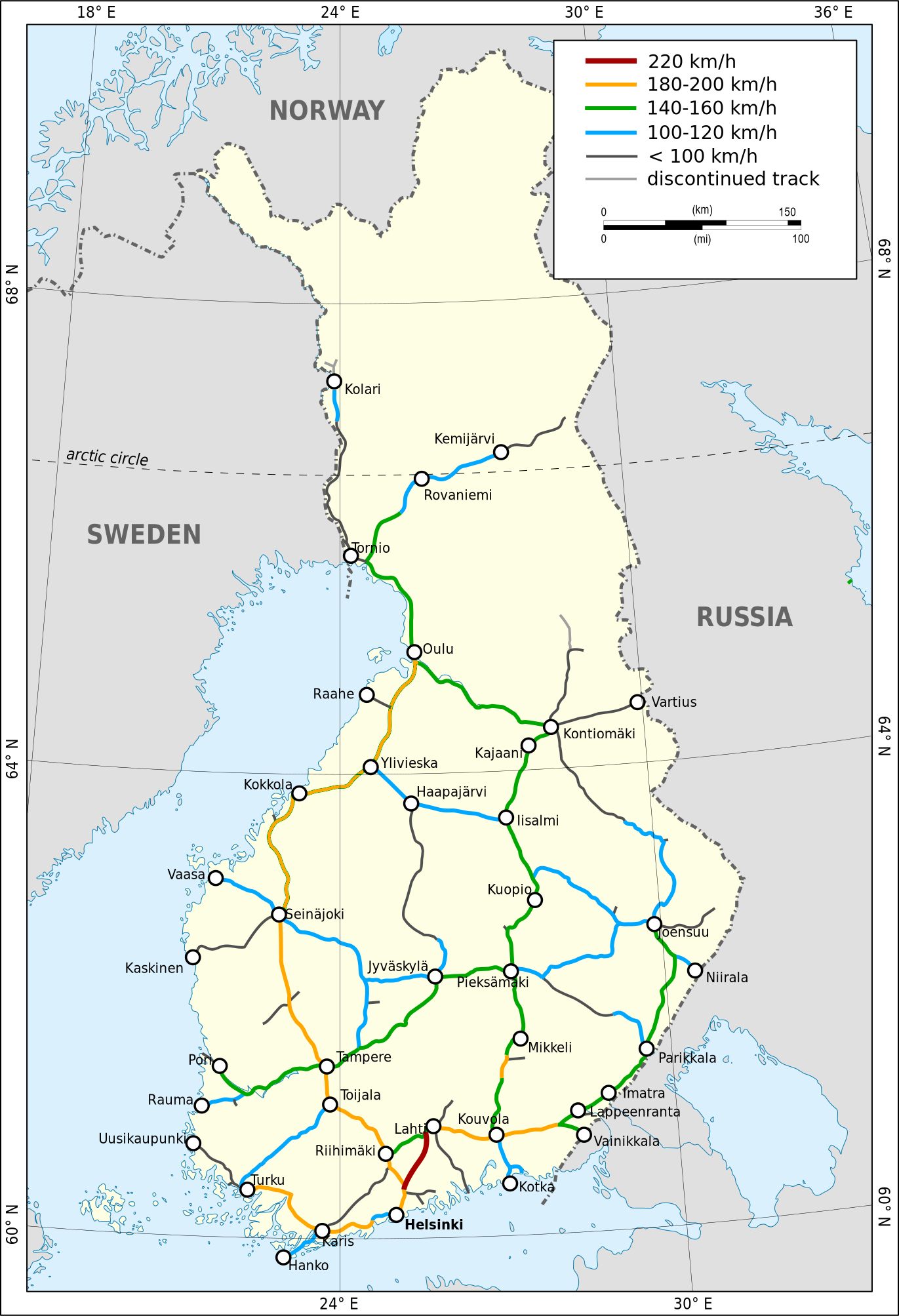
Running speeds on the Finnish railway network in the year 2019.

The maximum speed for passenger traffic is 220 km/h (140 mph), but is achieved only on the Kerava–Lahti railway line. Freight trains have a maximum speed of 120 km/h (75 mph). Actual speed limits vary depending on the train type and track portion. Some delays can occur in autumn and winter due to weather conditions (e.g. high winds).

=== Safety ===
The signalling system used on the railway network in Finland comprises color-light signals and fixed signs. They are used together with ATP-VR/RHK (EBICAB 900), a train protection system usually referred to as JKV (Finnish: junien kulunvalvonta) which has to be used on rolling stock. The system is set to be upgraded to ERTMS/ETCS in the upcoming years, however later than in other European countries due to the low age of the current train protection system. The first ETCS units are set to be installed in rolling stock during 2013, and the first ERTMS signalled portion of track should be opened between 2019 and 2025.

=== Platform heights ===
The current standard platform height is 550 mm (21.7 in) in Helsinki/Turku urban areas. Platforms that do not serve commuter trains are built to the older standard of ranging 127 mm (5.0 in) to 265 mm (10.4 in) above top of rail.

The sole exception on the national railway network is the Nikkilä halt which has a platform height of 400 mm (15.8 in).

The majority of the passenger rolling stocks in Finland and the other 1,520 mm (4 ft 11 27/32 in) gauge compatible network have bottom steps lower than 550 mm (21.7 in), thus the platforms with 550 mm (21.7 in) height can create negative vertical gaps, unlike the rest of Europe. There are current proposed figures:

- Minimum height clearance of the overhead bridges must be 8.1 m (26 ft 7 in) above platform level to provide tracks raising/lowering to changing platform heights between 127 mm (5.0 in) and 550 mm (21.7 in) without major structural change, and also provide container double-stacking under 25kV AC overhead lines.
- Platform heights of ranging 127 mm (5.0 in) to 265 mm (10.4 in) for long-distance trains.
- Platform height of 550 mm (21.7 in) for commuter trains.
- Platform height of 350 mm (13.8 in) for shared platforms.

== Lines ==
Most passenger rail services in Finland radiate from Helsinki Central, serving most major cities including Tampere, Turku, Oulu, Rovaniemi, Kouvola, Kuopio, Jyväskylä and Joensuu among others. Some towns are connected to the rail network by their own branch lines, yet are not served by passenger trains; examples include Porvoo, Uusikaupunki, Raahe and Rauma.

=== Railway links to adjacent countries ===
- Small break of gauge
  - Russia – small break of gauge 1,524 mm (5 ft)/1,520 mm (4 ft 11 27/32 in). This is within the tolerances and through running is done.
    - Vainikkala – Buslovskaya — electrified, change of voltage 25 kV AC/3 kV DC
    - Niirala – Vyartsilya — electrification missing
    - Imatrankoski – Svetogorsk — electrification missing
    - Vartius – Kostomuksha — electrified on Finnish side only
- Break of gauge
  - Sweden – 1,524 mm (5 ft)/1,435 mm (4 ft 8 1/2 in) standard gauge; change of voltage 25 kV AC/15 kV AC
    - Tornio–Haparanda railway

Before sanctions towards Russia due to its war in Ukraine, the freight railway traffic between Finland and Russia was more intensive compared to traffic between Finland and Sweden. There were also a few daily passenger trains between Russia and Finland.

=== Metros, trams and light rail ===
- Helsinki Metro (1522 mm gauge)
- Helsinki tram (1000 mm gauge)
- Jokeri light rail (1000 mm gauge)
- Tampere light rail (1435 mm gauge)

== See also ==
- Transport in Finland
- VR (company)
- High-speed rail in Finland
- List of railway lines in Finland
- List of Finnish locomotives
- Finnish Railway Museum
- Finnish Transport Infrastructure Agency
- Finnish railway signalling
- List of Finnish municipalities without scheduled railway services
- Narrow gauge railways in Finland
- Unilink coupler
- Dual coupling

== Sources ==
- Alameri, Mikko (1979). Suomen rautatiet (in Finnish and German). Verlag Josef Otto Slezak. ISBN 3-900134-52-9.
- F 6/2009 Finnish Network Statement 2011. Finnish Rail Administration. 15 December 2009. ISBN 978-952-445-318-9. ISSN 1797-7037. Archived from the original (PDF) on 29 September 2011.
- Network Statement 2012 (pdf). Finnish Transport Agency. 2010. ISBN 978-952-255-603-5. ISSN 1798-8284.
- Kymäläinen, Heidi (2010). Yhteiseurooppalaiseen junaliikenteen hallintajärjestelmään siirtymisen riskien arviointi (PDF) (in Finnish). Finnish Transport Agency. ISBN 978-952-255-601-1. ISSN 1798-6656. Archived from the original (PDF) on 2012-04-15.\
