= Itärata =

Planned railway line in Finland

Overview
- Locale: Uusimaa and Kymenlaakso, Finland
- Termini: Pasila; Kouvola

Technical
- Line length: 106 km (66 mi)
- Number of tracks: Double track
- Track gauge: 1,524 mm (5 ft)
- Electrification: 25 kV @ 50 Hz
- Operating speed: max 300 km/h (190 mph)

Itärata (English: East Rail) is a proposed railway line in the planning stage to provide a more direct connection between Helsinki and Kouvola, Finland than the current route via Kerava and Lahti.

== History ==
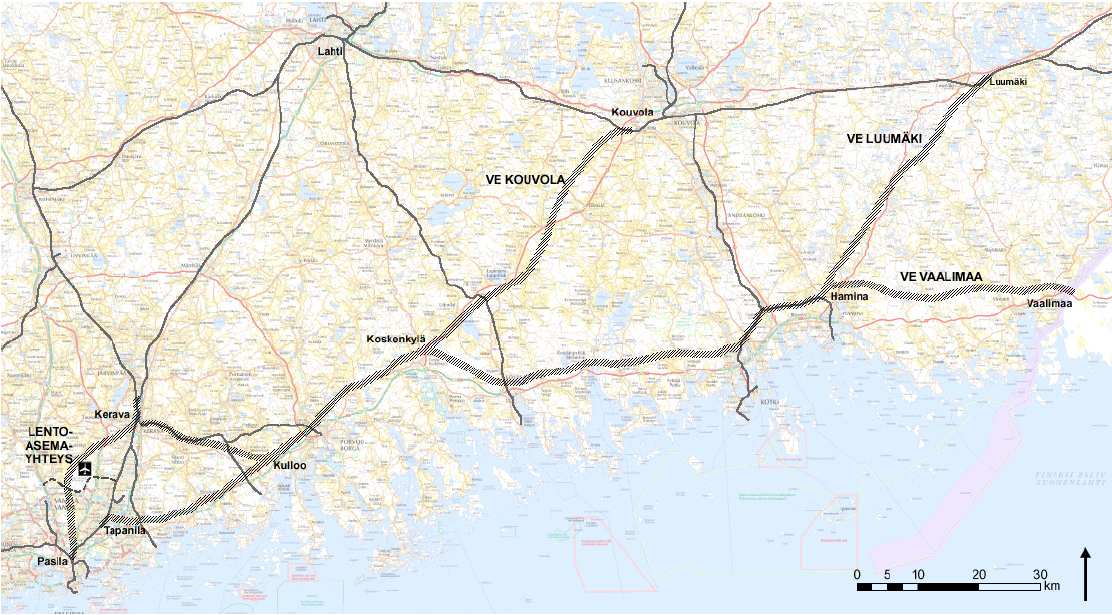
Alternatives for the Helsinki-Petersburg railway line

Plans for a railway line to run east of Helsinki to the Russian border, passing through Sipoo, Porvoo, Kotka and Hamina (known as "HELI-rata" in Finnish) were agreed in principle by Uusimaa Regional Council in 2010. The line would run through a tunnel to Pasila railway station and Helsinki Airport before following the route of the Finnish national road 7 to St Petersburg.

In 2018, a study was commissioned into the construction of a new 106 km (66 mi) rail line from Helsinki to Kouvola via Kerava and Porvoo, reducing the Helsinki to Kouvola travel time from 1 hour 18 minutes to 53 minutes. This new line would use the proposed Lentorata route between Helsinki and Kerava. With a 220 km/h (140 mph) line speed, the journey time for Helsinki-St Petersburg services could be reduced by nine minutes. A 15-minute reduction could be achieved if the infrastructure was built for 300 km/h (190 mph) operation. At a cost of €1.7 billion, it was not determined to be economically feasible by former Finnish transport minister Anne Berner, in spite of Porvoo's status as the largest Finnish municipality without a scheduled rail service; along with the significantly reduced travel times the line would bring to eastern Finnish cities including Lappeenranta, Kuopio, Joensuu and Mikkeli, which currently use the Kerava–Lahti railway line. In 2019, the government of Antti Rinne confirmed commitment to advancing proposals for this line.

On 21 January 2021, the Finnish Ministerial Committee on Economic Policy has decided to support the continuation of project company negotiations on the basis of the Lentorata-Porvoo- Kouvola policy, the Government press release states. Negotiations are ongoing with the municipalities and possibly other public entities benefiting from the railway line to establish a project company. The task of the project company would be to plan the project and finance it until it is ready for construction.

In July 2024, Itärata was accepted into the expanded Trans-European Transport Network (TEN-T). With the decision, Itärata Oy can apply for significant EU funding for the design of the railway project.

The master plan is estimated to be completed in 2028. The CEF programming period starting in 2028 is important because it allows for significant EU funding to be applied for. Construction will likely begin in the early 2030s but the Itärata project is also dependent on the completion of Lentorata and the goal is to complete it by 2040.

== Benefits ==
Itärata is said to affect the lives of 2 million Finns, almost half the Finnish population, by bringing them closer to the capital by rail. Travel times of three hours are expected between Helsinki and Kuopio, Joensuu and St Petersburg. Studies suggest that Itärata would generate a further 2.8 million rail trips annually. Porvoo, with a population of around 50,000, is the largest municipality in Finland without a scheduled railway service, and would gain a station on the new line allowing a 33-minute travel time to Helsinki.

== See also ==
- Lentorata
- Rail Baltica
- Rail Nordica
- High-speed rail in Finland
- List of railway lines in Finland
- Rail transport in Finland
- Helsinki–Turku high-speed railway
