= Helsinki–Turku high-speed railway =

Proposed railway line in Finland

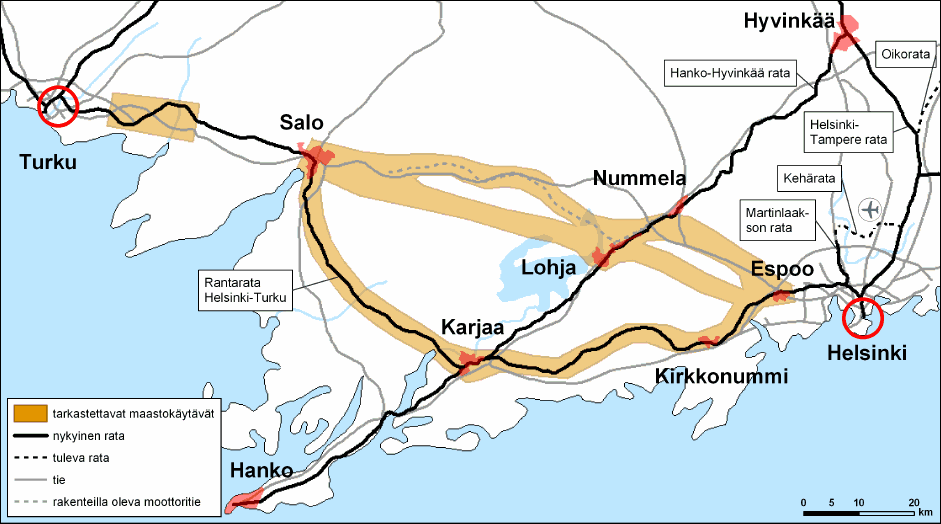
- Proposed route of the Helsinki–Turku high-speed railway

Overview
- Locale: Southwest Finland
- Termini: Espoo; Turku

Technical
- Number of tracks: Double track
- Track gauge: 1,524 mm (5 ft)
- Electrification: 25 kV @ 50 Hz

The Helsinki–Turku high-speed railway or Espoo–Salo-oikorata (Espoo–Salo direct line), also formerly known as the ELSA-rata (Espoo-Lohja-Salo), is a proposed railway line in the planning stage to provide a more direct connection between Helsinki and Turku, Finland than the current Rantarata railway line which follows the southern coast. The project is also known as Turun tunnin juna (Turku one hour train), despite the fact that a journey between Helsinki and Turku on the new line would last about 1 hour and 18 minutes.

The current Orpo cabinet plans to fund construction between Espoo and Lohja and between Salo and Kupittaa. As of December 2025, all municipalities on the route have approved funding for the project, except Kirkkonummi, which voted to not provide any funding the project.

== History ==
The first examination of a direct rail link between Espoo and Salo took place in 1979. The current plans for the new railway line involve destruction of the homes for hundreds of people since it would go right through housing areas. The construction of 95 km (59 mi) of track between Espoo and Salo with maximum running speeds of 300 km/h (190 mph), allowing for a journey time of an hour and 18 minutes between Helsinki and Turku compared to the current one hour and 54 minutes. In 2017, the Finnish government provided €10 million in funding towards the planning and construction of the line, with half of this being eligible for European Union TEN-T funding.

In April 2018, the Finnish Transport Agency awarded planning contracts for the line to three consultants: Sitowise Finland for the Espoo to Lohja section of track, Pöyry for the Lohja to Suomusjärvi section, and Ramboll for the Suomusjärvi to Salo section. After the 2019 Finnish parliamentary election, new Prime Minister of Finland Antti Rinne's government confirmed its commitment to advancing the three planned Finnish high-speed rail lines: the ELSA-rata, a Helsinki-Tampere line, and the Itärata line from Helsinki to Eastern Finland.

In September 2019, the Ministry of Economic Affairs and Employment gave authorisation to the Ministry of Transport and Communications to establish the Turku One Hour Train Project Company to oversee the Helsinki–Turku high-speed rail line, and the Suomirata Project Company, which will manage development of the new Riihimäki–Tampere line.

Following the Finnish government's request for investment in February 2020, the EU's Connecting Europe Facility approved €37.5 million in funding for the Helsinki–Turku high-speed rail project in July 2020, to form an integral part of the Trans-European Transport Network's Helsinki–Valletta Corridor.

In October 2021, the project company began the planning stage of the project. The name of the project and the company was changed from Turun tunnin juna ("Turku One Hour Train") to Länsirata ("West Railway") in December 2023.

In July 2024, the European Commission declined an application for funding the construction of the railway, prompting multiple members of parliament to question the future of the project. In response, Prime Minister Petteri Orpo stated that the railway's construction is going ahead, with the section between Espoo and Lohja to be built under his government and the remaining section between Lohja and Salo left to future governments.

== Current proposal ==
The line is planned to branch from the Rantarata after Espoo railway station, connecting to Salo following the Finnish national road 1 corridor, through the municipalities of Vihti and Lohja. To complement the line and increase capacity, the track between Leppävaara and Espoo will be quadrupled as part of the Helsinki commuter rail services. New stations are proposed to be built in Hista (Espoo), Veikkola, Nummela and Lempola (Lohja).

In July 2019, residents of the Lukkarinmäki area of Salo have gathered a petition of 2,500 signatures against building the line through their neighbourhood, due to the potential need to demolish some properties. Alternatives proposed include building the line to avoid the neighbourhood or building a tunnel.

The total construction cost of the ELSA-rata was estimated at €1.5 billion as of 2016, with planning costs of €40 million. In 2019 it was reported that the expected cost had increased to €2 billion. In December 2023 the project company Länsirata Oy lowered their cost estimates significantly due to major changes in project planning. The whole project was estimated to cost from 2,8 to 3 billion euros.

== See also ==
- High-speed rail in Finland
- List of railway lines in Finland
- Rail transport in Finland
- Rantarata
