= Lentorata =

Planned Helsinki Airport rail link

Coordinates: 60.3158869°N 24.97172319°E

Overview
- Locale: Helsinki; Vantaa
- Termini: Pasila; Kerava
- Website: lentorata.fi

Technical
- Line length: 25 km (16 mi)
- Number of tracks: Double track
- Track gauge: 1,524 mm (5 ft)
- Electrification: 25 kV @ 50 Hz

Lentorata (lit. 'Airport Line', but also meaning 'orbit') is a planned railway line in Finland, designed to link Helsinki Airport to the Finnish long-distance railway network and to complement the current airport connection via the Ring Rail Line. Construction of the line is not expected to start until 2030, with the line operational several years later.

== History ==
Lentorata has been included in the Finnish Transport Agency's plans since 2010. Following the opening of the Ring Rail Line in 2015, Helsinki Airport gained its first railway connection through the Helsinki commuter rail network. Long-distance trains stop at Tikkurila railway station where frequent commuter trains take passengers to the airport. However, a need has also been identified for a rail link at the airport for long-distance traffic, with support from Finavia, the mayors of Helsinki and Tampere and the chief executive of the state-owned national rail company VR Group.

== Route ==
The line is planned to travel in a 24 kilometres (15 mi) long tunnel under built-up areas and to serve the underground Helsinki Airport station, with the total length of new line being 25 kilometres (16 mi). The line allows direct access to the airport terminal from long-distance rail services, and frees the rail capacity taken up by long-distance traffic in the current main corridor (the Helsinki–Riihimäki railway) for increasing local commuter traffic. The tunnel would surface south of Kerava railway station, where trains would continue northward to Tampere on the Riihimäki–Tampere railway or a brand new parallel line, or to the Lahti Direct Line.

The proposed Itärata line to Kouvola would branch off of Lentorata in the tunnel near Kerava.

== Cost ==
In 2019, Helsinki Times reported that, as part of a new rail connection with an expected travel time of one hour from Helsinki to Tampere via the airport, the project would cost a total of €5.5 billion.

== See also ==
- List of railway lines in Finland
- Rail transport in Finland
- Rail Baltica
- Itärata
- Ring Rail Line
