= High-speed rail in Finland =

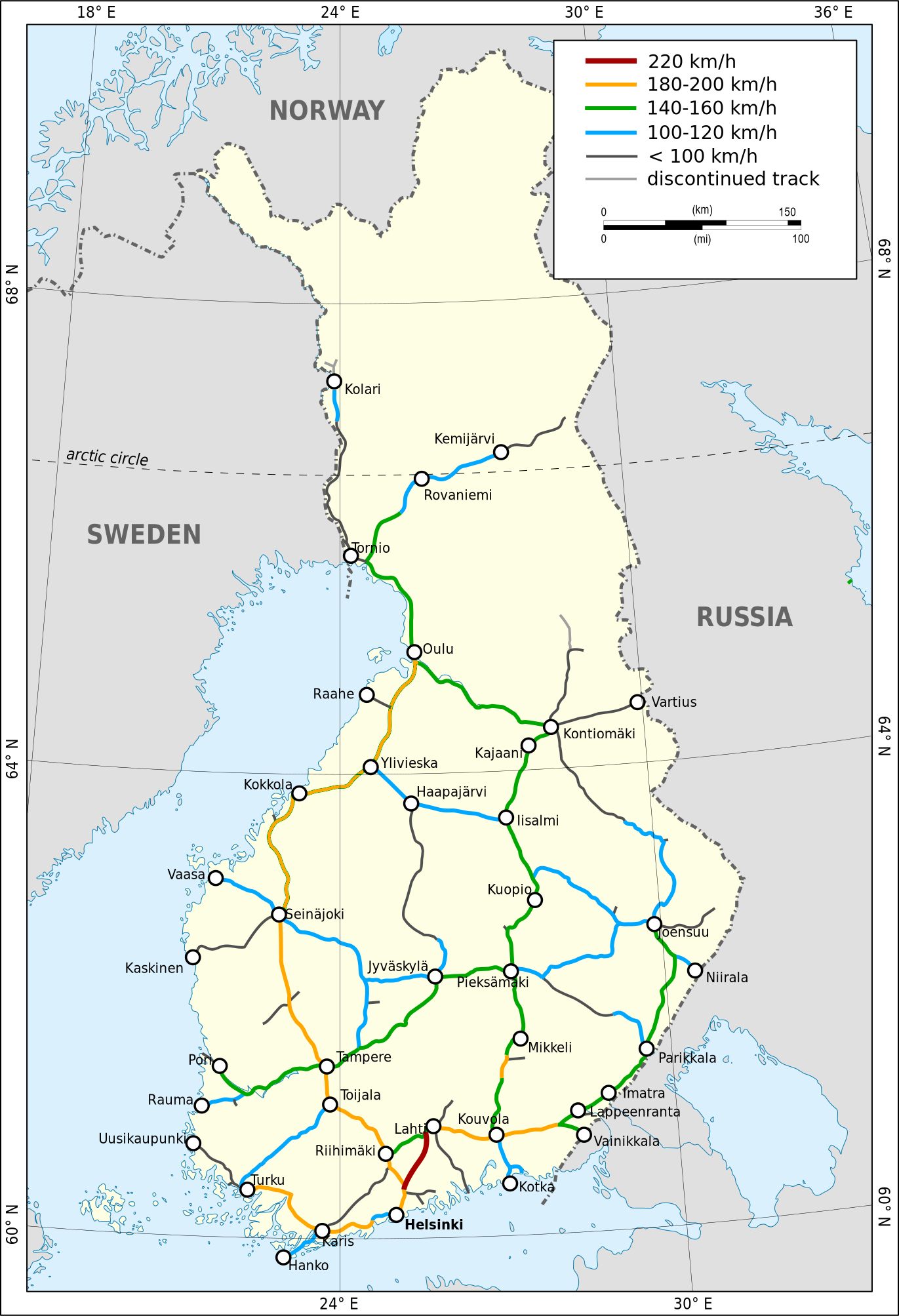
Running speeds on the Finnish railway network.

Although Finland has no dedicated high-speed rail lines, sections of its rail network are capable of running speeds of up to 220 km/h (137 mph). The Finnish national railway company VR operates tilting Alstom Pendolino trains. The trains reach their maximum speed of 220 km/h (137 mph) in regular operation on a 75.7 km (47.0 mi) route between Kerava and Lahti. This portion of track was opened in 2006. The trains can run at 200 km/h (125 mph) on a longer route between Helsinki and Seinäjoki and peak at that speed between Helsinki and Turku. The main railway line between Helsinki and Oulu has been upgraded between Seinäjoki and Oulu to allow for trains to run at speeds between 160 km/h (100 mph) and 200 km/h (125 mph). Other parts of the Finnish railway network are limited to lower speed.

A new service called Allegro started between Helsinki and Saint Petersburg, Russia, in December 2010 with a journey time of 3½ hours. It utilized four trains, with a top speed of 220 km/h (137 mph) which were a Pendolino model, supporting both Finnish and Russian standards. However the service was discontinued in 2022, following the Russian invasion of Ukraine.

Between 2007 and 2010 the Russian line from the Finnish border to Saint Petersburg was electrified and improved to allow higher running speeds. The Finnish line (Riihimäki – Saint Petersburg Railway) was also upgraded where needed, mostly to 200 km/h (125 mph).

== Current proposals ==
There are proposals for high speed rail links between Helsinki and other major Finnish cities, with the Green League proposing a €10 billion investment into the country's rail infrastructure in 2018. After the 2019 Finnish parliamentary election, new Prime Minister of Finland Antti Rinne's government confirmed its commitment to advancing the three planned Finnish high-speed rail lines; the ELSA-rata, a Helsinki-Tampere line, and a link from Helsinki to Eastern Finland. Sanna Marin, Minister of Transport and Communications, stated in July 2019 that "we must first plan and secure the funding, before we can start building. The three high-speed links – the westbound, northbound and eastbound links – will cost a total of 10 billion euros to build. Planning the projects alone will cost roughly 350 million euros. This isn't a small amount given that roughly one billion euros is allocated for transport projects every electoral term."

In September 2019, the Ministry of Economic Affairs and Employment gave authorisation to the Ministry of Transport and Communications to establish the Turku One Hour Train Project Company to oversee the Helsinki–Turku high-speed rail line, and the Suomirata Project Company, which will manage development of the new Riihimäki–Tampere line. Along with this announcement, Marin confirmed the lines would most likely not be operational until the 2030s at earliest.

=== Helsinki–Turku ===
The only rail link between Helsinki and Turku is the Rantarata railway line, with journey times of around two hours. The first examination of a more direct rail link between the two cities Espoo and Salo took place in 1979. The current plans for the new railway line involve the construction of 95 km (59 mi) of track between Espoo and Salo with maximum running speeds of 300 km/h (186 mph) per hour, allowing for a journey time of an hour between Helsinki and Turku compared to the current two hours; expecting to add a further 1.6 million annual passenger rail trips a year. In 2017, the Finnish government provided €10 million in funding towards the planning and construction of the line, with half of this being eligible for European Union TEN-T funding. As of October 2018 the line is scheduled for completion by 2031.

The proposal has been taken forward by the Orpo cabinet. As of autumm 2025 the government and municipalities along the route (Turku, Salo, Lohja, Vihti, Kirkkonummi and Espoo) have agreed to a joint funding model.

=== Helsinki–Airport–Tampere ===
The Lentorata has been included in the Finnish Transport Agency's plans since 2010. Following the opening of the Ring Rail Line in 2015, Helsinki Airport gained its first railway connection through the Helsinki commuter rail network. However, a need has also been identified for a rail link to long distance traffic, with support from Finavia, the mayors of Helsinki and Tampere and the chief executive of the state-owned national rail company VR Group.

In 2019, Helsinki Times reported that a new rail connection is under consideration with an expected travel time of one hour from Helsinki to Tampere via the airport, using the new airport line and either an upgraded Riihimäki–Tampere railway or brand new track, would cost a total of €5.5 billion. This new line is expected to generate a further 6.5 million rail trips annually.

=== Helsinki–Tallinn tunnel ===
As possible future project connected to the Rail Baltica project, an undersea rail tunnel between Helsinki and Tallinn is proposed, linking the Finnish rail network to continental Europe. An estimated 12.5 million annual passengers would use the tunnel.

=== Helsinki–Airport–Kouvola ===
In 2018, a study was commissioned into the construction of a new 106 km (66 mi) rail line from Helsinki to Kouvola via Kerava and Porvoo, reducing the Helsinki to Kouvola travel time from 1 hour 18 minutes to 53 minutes. This new line would use the proposed Lentorata route between Helsinki and Kerava. With a 220 km/h (140 mph) line speed, the journey time for Helsinki-St Petersburg services could be reduced by nine minutes. A 15-minute reduction could be achieved if the infrastructure was built for 300 km/h (190 mph) operation, and is forecasted to generate a further 2.8 million rail trips annually. At a cost of €1.7 billion, it was not determined to be economically feasible by former Finnish transport minister Anne Berner, in spite of Porvoo's status as the largest Finnish municipality without a scheduled rail service; along with the significantly reduced travel times the line would bring to eastern Finnish cities including Lappeenranta, Kuopio, Joensuu and Mikkeli, which currently use the Kerava–Lahti railway line. In 2019, the government of Antti Rinne confirmed commitment to advancing proposals for this line.

== Former proposals ==
=== Helsinki–Jyväskylä ===
In 2011 the region of Central Finland produced a study into a high-speed rail connection between Helsinki and Jyväskylä, narrowed down to three options; via Tampere, Riihimäki or Lahti; with a top speed of 200 km/h (124 mph)–250 km/h (155 mph) and estimated costs of €580–970 million. No further work has progressed as of 2019.

=== Lahti–Mikkeli ===
A further section of high-speed track under discussion is a 126 km (78 mi) line from Lahti to Mikkeli with one intermediate station at Heinola. This would shorten the distance by rail between the two cities by 29 km (18 mi); with a 42-46 minute travel time reduction if built to a maximum speed of 220 km/h (140 mph), or a 50-56 minute reduction if 300 km/h (190 mph). The projected cost of this project in 2019 was €1.5 billion. This route offers faster journey times to Mikkeli, Kuopio and Kajaani, but not Joensuu and Lappeenranta.

== See also ==
- High-speed rail in Europe
- Rail transport in Finland
