= VR Class Sr3 =

Dual-mode locomotive

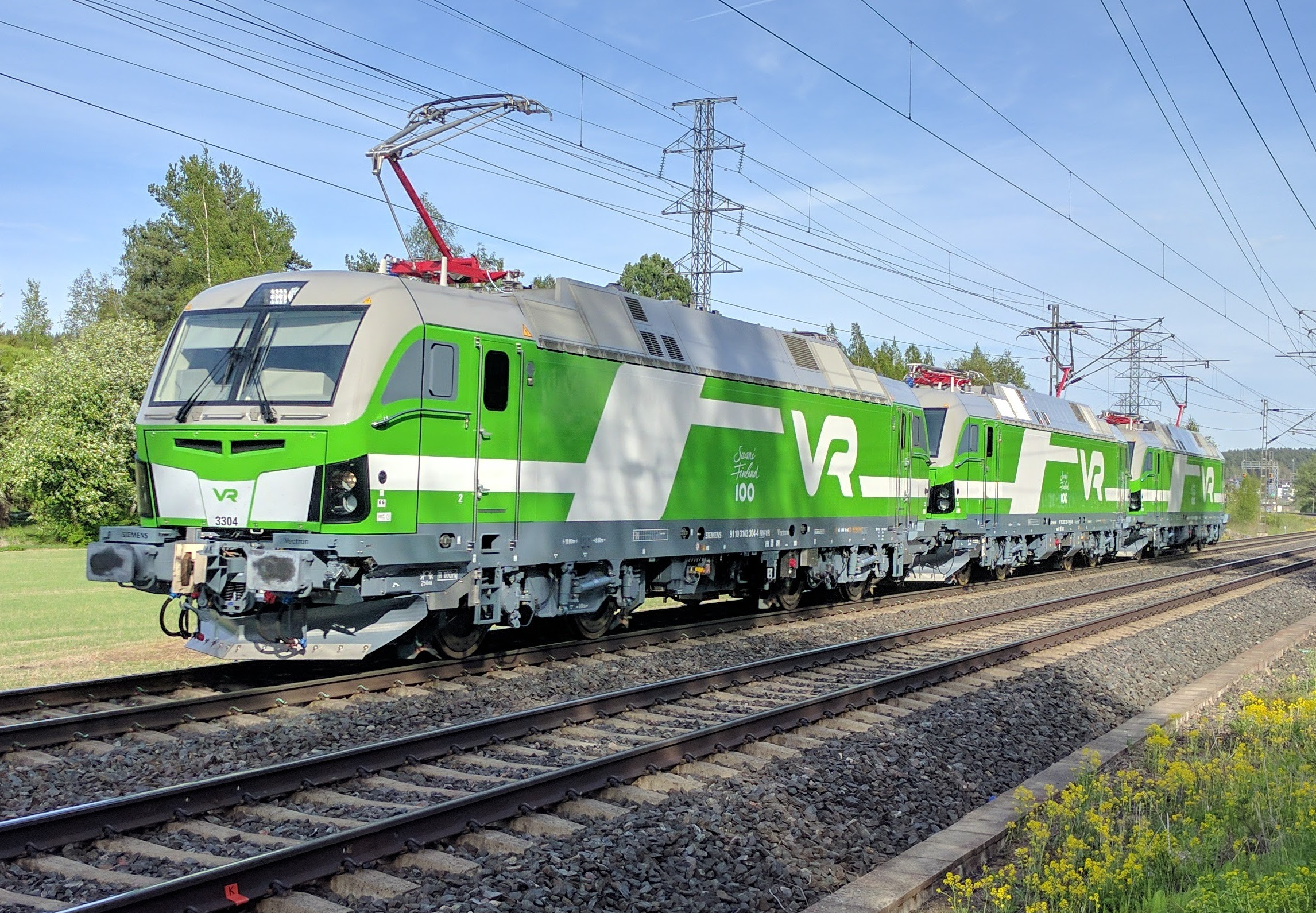
- Three VR Sr3 locomotives between Hämeenlinna and Parola stations.
Type and origin
- Power type: Dual-mode (electric and last mile diesel)
- Builder: Siemens Mobility
Specifications
- Gauge: 1,524 mm (5 ft)
- Length: 19,049 mm (750 in)
- Width: 3,013 mm (118 5/8 in)
- Height: 4,400 mm (173 1/4 in)
- Axle load: 22.5 t (22.1 long tons; 24.8 short tons)
- Loco weight: 90 t 89 long tons; 99 short tons
- Electric system/s: 25 kV AC 50 Hz Overhead lines
- Current pickup: Pantograph
Performance figures
- Maximum speed: 200 km/h (125 mph)
- Power output: 6.4 MW (8,600 hp)
Career
- Operators: VR; Fenniarail
- Number in class: 80 in service (VR); 3 in service (Fenniarail)
- Numbers: 3301–3380 (VR); 201-203 (Fenniarail)
- Nicknames: Vektori (Vektor) Vekkuli (Monkey)
- Delivered: 2016-2026
- First run: 2017
- Disposition: In service

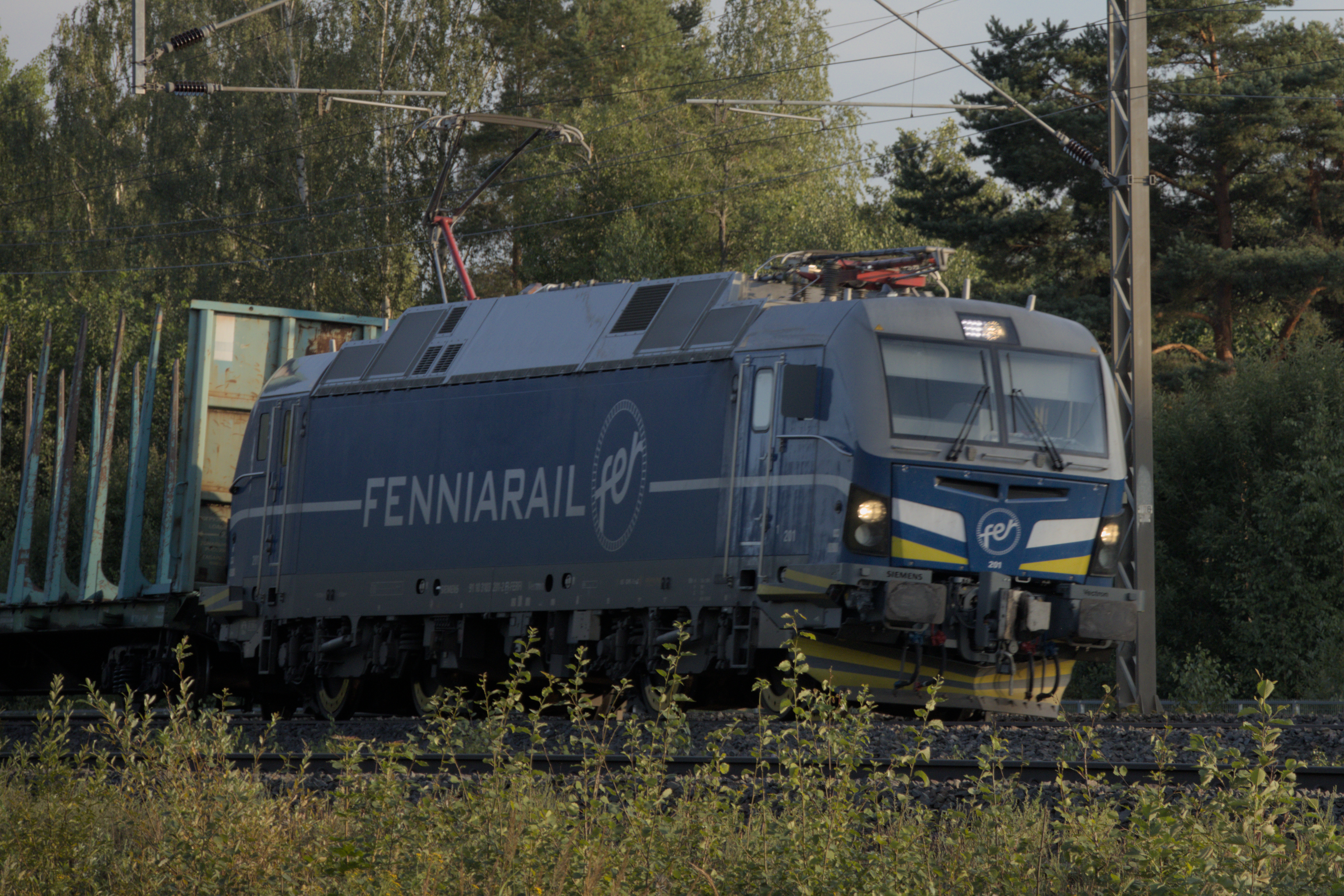
A Fenniarail Sr3 locomotive

VR Class Sr3 is a bi-mode locomotive series used by VR Group and Fenniarail. It is based on the Vectron model, manufactured by Siemens Mobility. VR's Sr3 locomotives are used with both passenger and freight trains and they will replace the old Class Sr1 electric locomotives.

== See also ==
- VR Class Sr1
- VR Class Sr2
