= VR Class Sr2 =

Electric locomotive

VR class Sr2
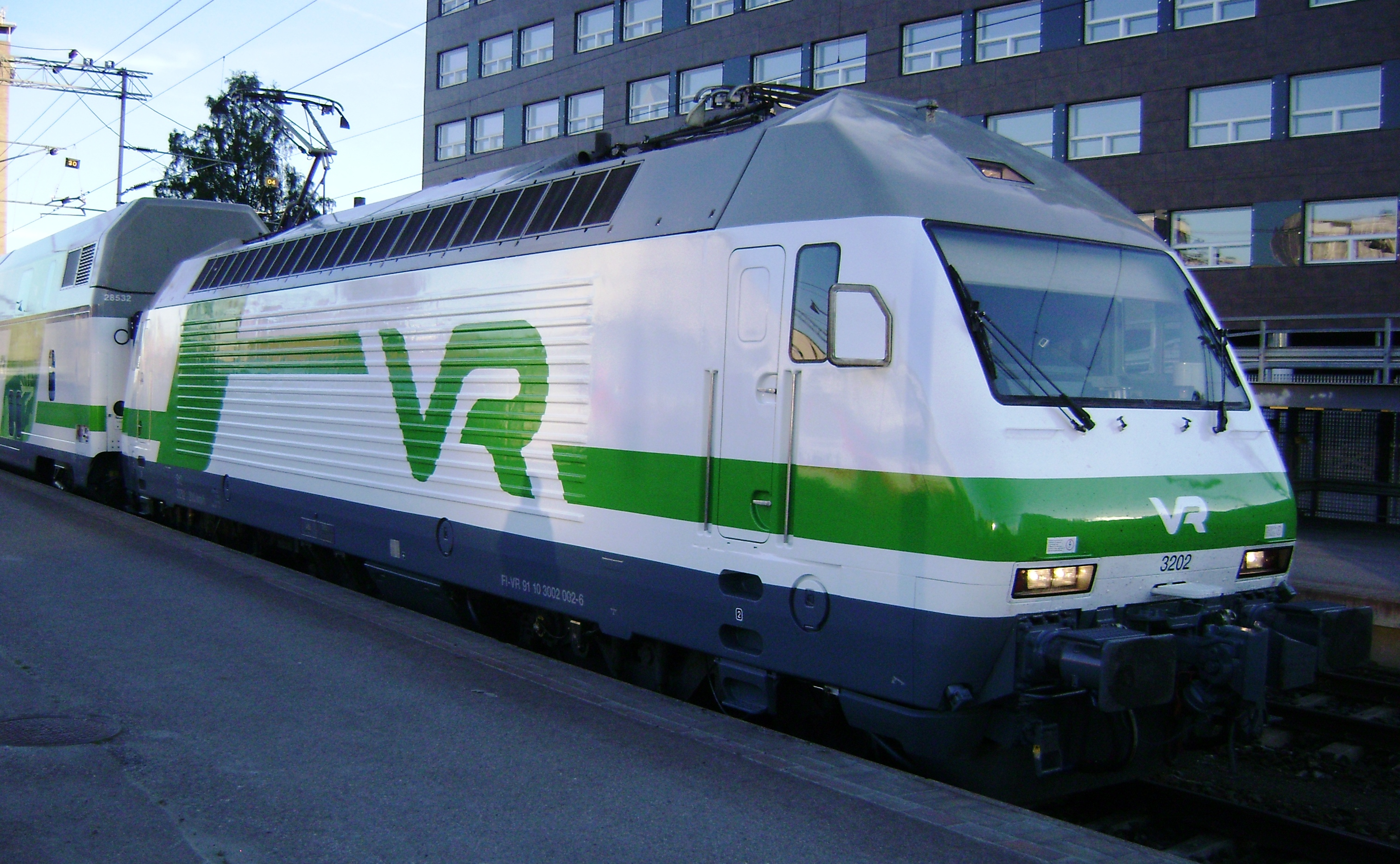
- An Sr2 locomotive at Tampere railway station, June 2012
Type and origin
- Power type: Electric
- Builder: SLM, ABB, later Adtranz then Bombardier assembly Transtech Oy
- Build date: 1995–2003
Specifications
- Configuration
  - AAR: B-B
  - UIC: Bo′Bo′
- Gauge: 1,524 mm (5 ft)
- Wheel diameter: 1,100 mm (43.31 in)
- Length: 19.02 m (62 ft 5 in)
- Loco weight: 82 tonnes (80.7 long tons; 90.4 short tons)
- Electric system/s: 25 kV AC 50 Hz Overhead lines
- Current pickup: Pantograph
- Traction motors: 4 ABB motors 6FHA 7067
Performance figures
- Maximum speed: 210 km/h (130 mph)
- Power output: 6,000 kW (8,050 hp) max continuous 5,000 kW (6,700 hp)
- Tractive effort: 280 kN (62,950 lbf)
Career
- Operators: VR
- Number in class: 46
- Numbers: 3201–3246
- First run: 1995
- Disposition: In service

The Sr2 is a class of electric locomotives of the VR Group. They were built by SLM/ABB and later by Adtranz and finally Bombardier Transportation and assembled by Transtech Oy. They are closely based on the class Re 460 (or Lok 2000) locomotives of Swiss Federal Railways.

The nicknames of this class are Alppiruusu (Edelweiss), Käkikello (Cuckoo clock), both referring to the Swiss origin of the locomotive, as well as Marsu (Guinea pig) and Möhkö (Blob), both from the looks of the locomotive.

== History ==
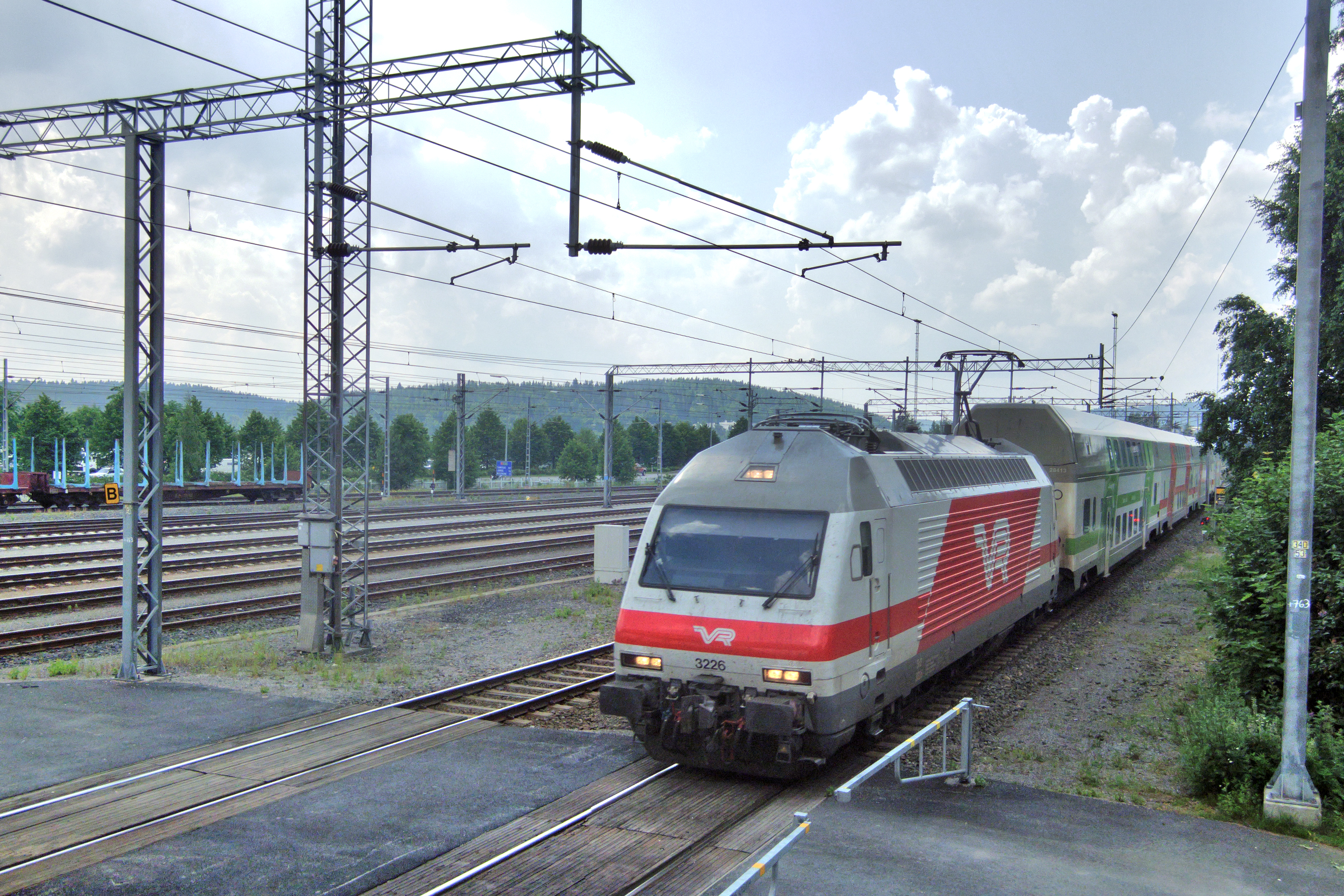
An Sr2 locomotive pulls an InterCity train to Jyväskylä station.

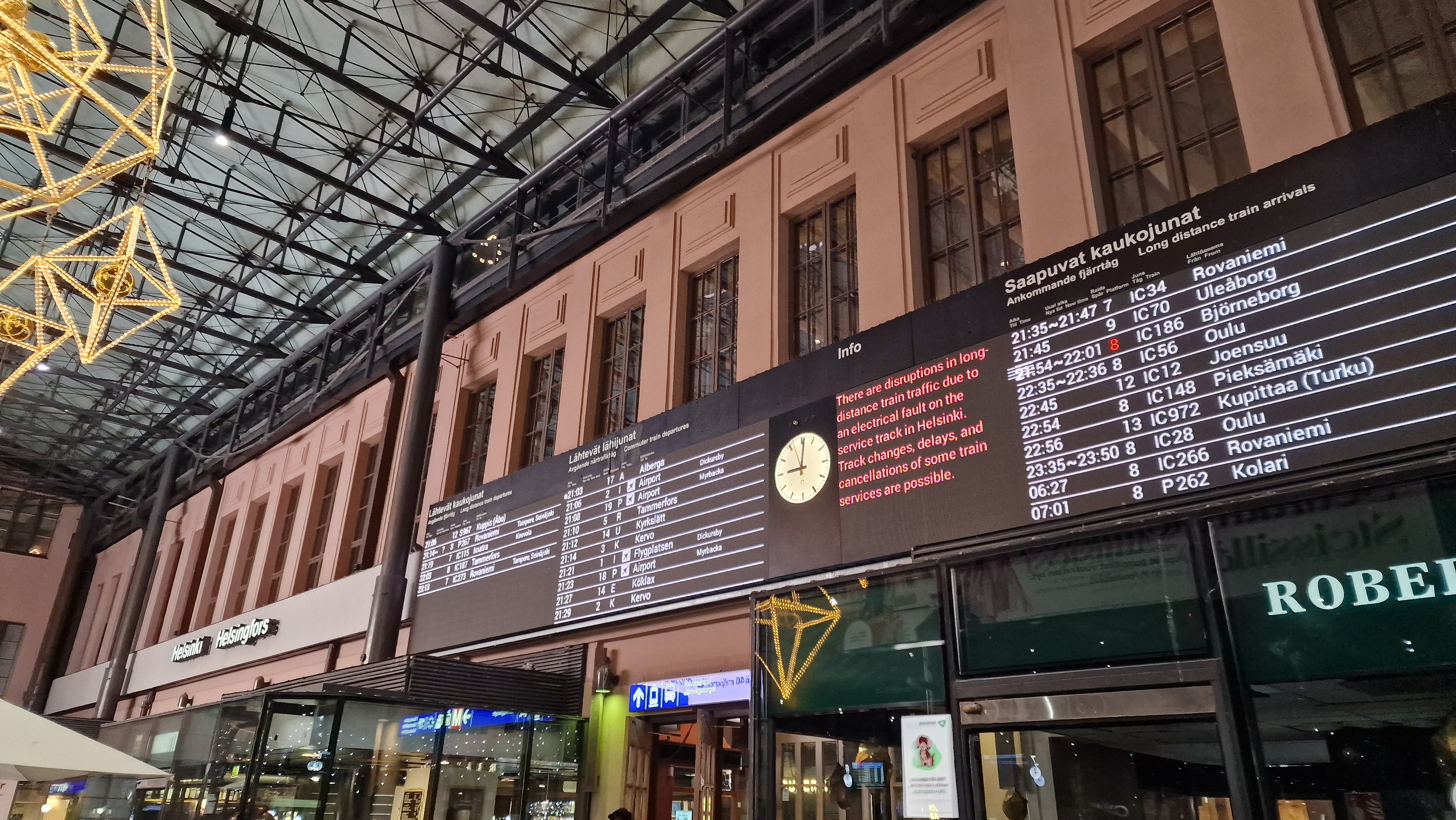
Departure board at Finnish railway station showing overnight sleeper service

In 1992, VR ordered the first 20 class Sr2 locomotives; later 20 more were ordered with 12 options. Finally only six of the 12 options were transformed into orders, forming a total fleet of 46 engines. The locomotives are used on both passenger trains and freight trains, and they are the primary locomotives of the fast InterCity trains in Finland.

Until mid-2010s Sr2s were pulling IC trains the classic way, but after Edo-class cab control cars were introduced in 2013, Sr2 units have been used in pull-push mode with IC double deck stock. Until introduction of new Sr3 locomotives, Sr2 has been the only electric locomotive equipped for push-pull among Finnish rolling stock.

== Technical information ==
When introduced, the Sr2 was the fastest and most powerful locomotive of the VR. It was designed with a top speed of 230 km/h (140 mph) and early units had that speed marked on them. During test runs, it has achieved a speed of 232 km/h (144 mph). However, VR later limited the top speed to 210 km/h (130 mph), since test runs require 10% faster speed than the targeted commercial speed.

The locomotive has GTO-thyristor inverters driving three-phase asynchronous AC motors. The maximum power of each air-cooled motor is 1,560 kW (2,090 hp) at 2,600 V. Combined, they are capable of a power output of 6,100 kilowatts (8,200 hp) (5,000 kW (6,700 hp) continuous power). The motors are small and fit entirely within the bogies. The bogies weigh only 15.8 tonnes and are equipped with radially steered axles. This reduces rail wear significantly. A redesigned bogie construction was refitted by the manufacturer in the mid-2000s after the locomotives were found to oscillate sideways when running at speeds of over 160 km/h (99 mph).

The whole construction of the locomotive is modular and all functions are controlled by several microprocessors via the locomotive bus (MICAS S2). The system is redundant, so that a failure in one processor does not harm the overall system. The data lines are fiber optic cables.

Sr2 units are fitted with Unilink couplers, which combine a SA3 and a traditional chain coupler.

== Design and livery ==
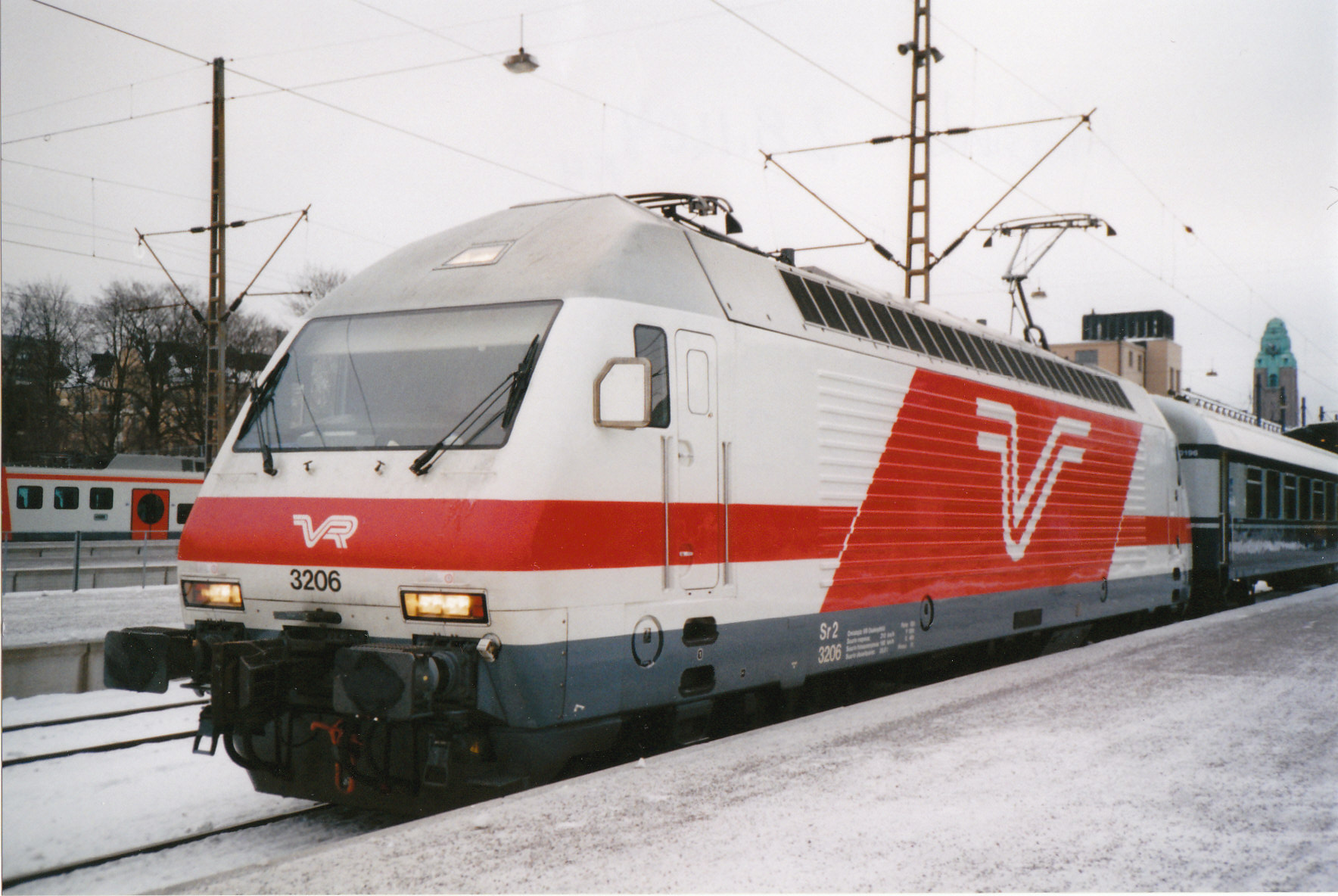
The oldest livery of the Sr2, showing the V-shaped logo on the side of the body.

As with all the Lok 2000 locomotives, the external design is by Pininfarina. The series were painted red and white, showcasing VR's InterCity colours, with a large V on the bodyside to symbolise VR's high-speed traffic. Starting from number 3222 the V was replaced with VR's logo. Beginning from 2010 and starting from engine number 3221, all units were repainted with VR's current colour scheme (green and white).

== See also ==
- VR Class Sr1
- VR Class Sr3
- NSB El 18
- SBB-CFF-FFS Re 460
