= VR Class Sr1 =

Finnish electric locomotive class

VR class Sr1 NEVZ VL70 (НЭВЗ ВЛ70) NEVZ ES40 (НЭВЗ ЭС40)
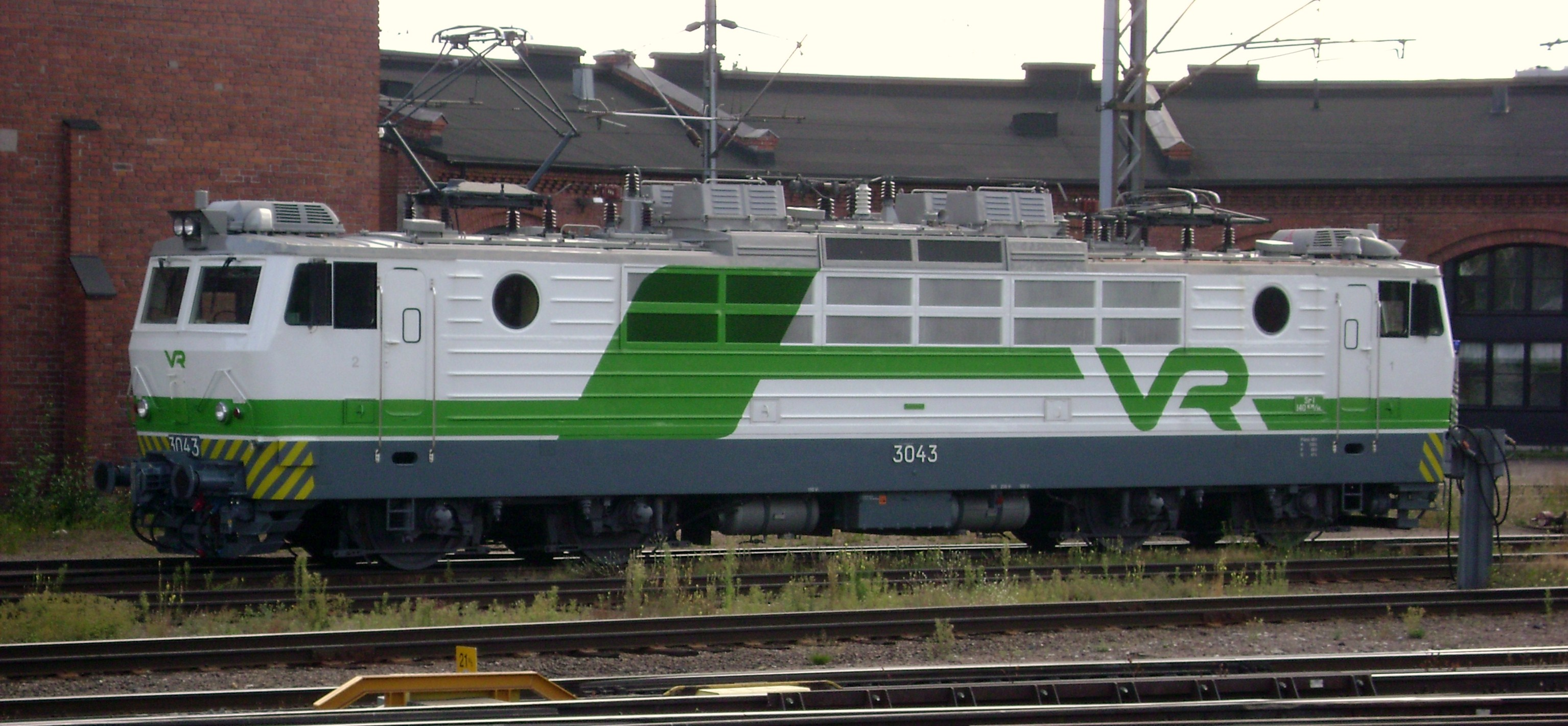
- VR Class Sr1 number 3043 at Kouvola station in 2011
Type and origin
- Power type: Electric
- Builder: Novocherkassk Electric Locomotive Plant, VR Hyvinkää Machine Workshops; Škoda Electric, Strömberg
- Build date: 1971, 1973–1985, 1993, 1995
- Total produced: 112
Specifications
- Configuration
  - AAR: B-B
  - UIC: Bo′Bo′
- Gauge: 1,524 mm (5 ft)
- Wheel diameter: 1,250 mm (49.21 in)
- Length: 18.96 m (62 ft 2 1/2 in)
- Loco weight: 84 tonnes (83 long tons; 93 short tons)
- Electric system/s: 25 kV 50 Hz AC catenary
- Current pickup: Pantograph
Performance figures
- Maximum speed: 140 km/h (87 mph)
- Power output: 3,100 kW (4,160 hp)
- Tractive effort: 280 kN (62,900 lbf)
Career
- Operators: VR
- Number in class: 110 in use
- First run: 1973–1996
- Disposition: Still in service, planned retirement from 2019

The Sr1 is a class of electric locomotives built for VR of Finland. These 25 kV locomotives were built in the Soviet Union at the Novocherkassk Electric Locomotive Factory between 1973 and 1985. Two additional locomotives of this class were built at the VR Hyvinkää Machine Workshop in 1993 and 1995, number 3111 from spare parts and number 3112 from the original prototype locomotive (number 3000) that was never used by the VR. The official classification given by the manufacturer is VL70 or ES40.

The nicknames for these locomotives are "Siperian susi" (Wolf of Siberia; in Finnish slang "susi" can also mean a poorly manufactured object, compare English "dog" or "lemon"), "Kaalihäkki" (Cabbage Cage) and "Sähköryssä" (Electric Russkie).

== History ==
In 1970, Valtionrautatiet ordered 27 electric locomotives from Energomachexport, which were delivered between September 1973 and the end of the year 1975. 82 additional locomotives were ordered and delivered between 1973 and 1985. The first prototype locomotive, number 3000, was bought from the constructor in 1994 by VR, which rebuilt it into number 3112.

The trains have been used in passenger and cargo transport on Finland's electrified rail network.

A list of overall locomotives made is shown below:

Year	Number of units delivered	Unit numbers	Notes
1971	1	3000	Prototype locomotive. Kept by NEVZ up till the mid 1990s.
1973	4	3001–3004	First batch, introduced the same year.
1974	2	3005–3006	First batch.
1975	21	3007–3027	First batch.
1976	12	3028–3039	
1977	12	3040–3051	
1978	12	3052–3063	
1979	12	3064–3075	
1980	10	3076–3085	
1981	7	3086–3092	
1982	6	3093–3098	
1983	6	3099–3104	
1984	5	3105–3109	
1985	1	3110	
1993	1	3111	Built at Hyvinkää in Finland from spare parts.
1995	1	3112	Rebuilt at Hyvinkää in Finland from unit 3000.

== Livery ==
The locomotives originally carried a dark red livery, with light yellow stripes around and below the cab windows. The stripes were later replaced with yellow warning panels (resembling stylised wings) below the cab windows. From the early 1990s onwards this livery was replaced by an off-white livery with red stripes. Nowadays the locomotives are refitted with a white-green livery to go with the current company colours.

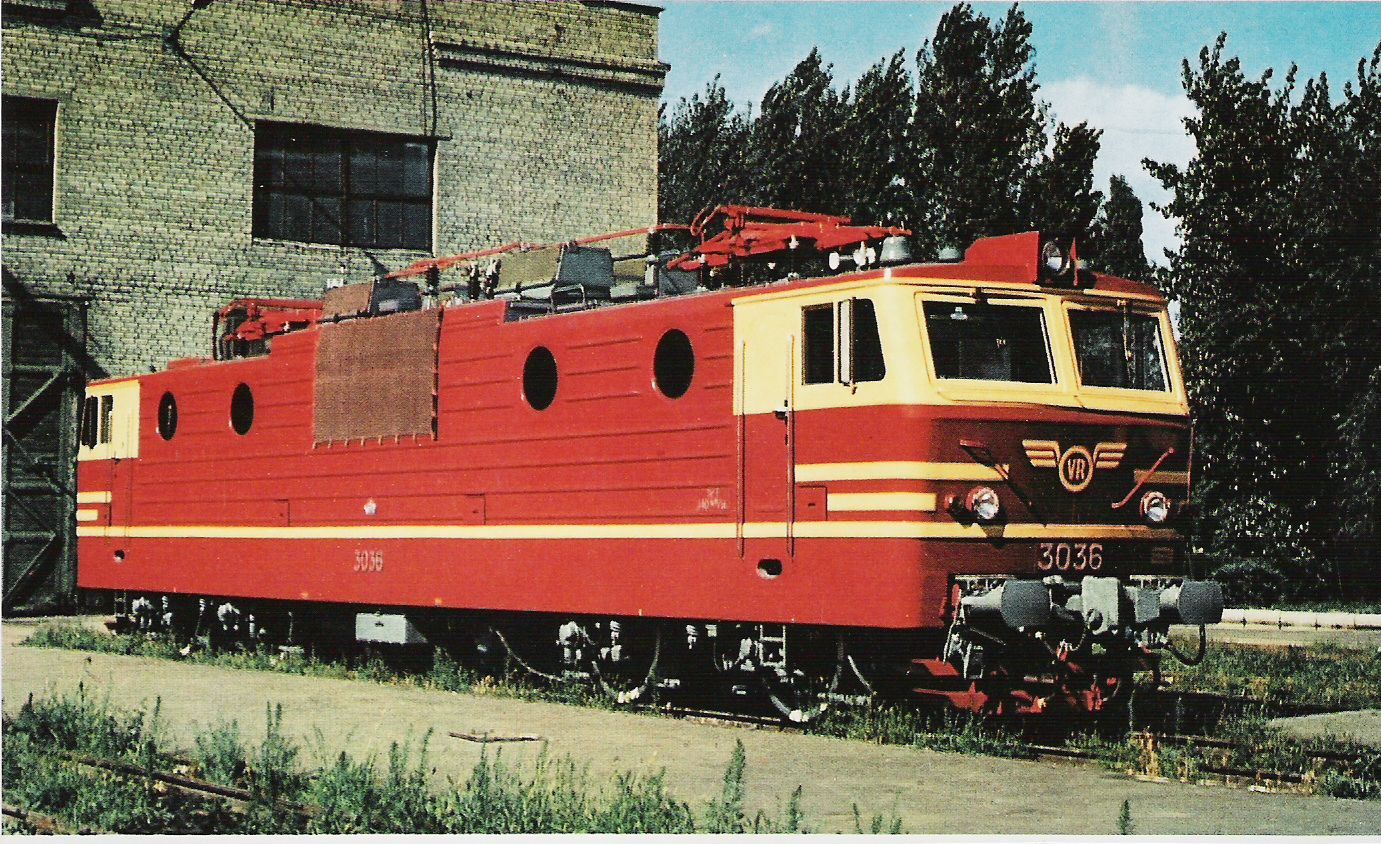
Sr1 3036 in its first livery at NEVZ Novocherkassk, freshly outshopped, circa 1976.

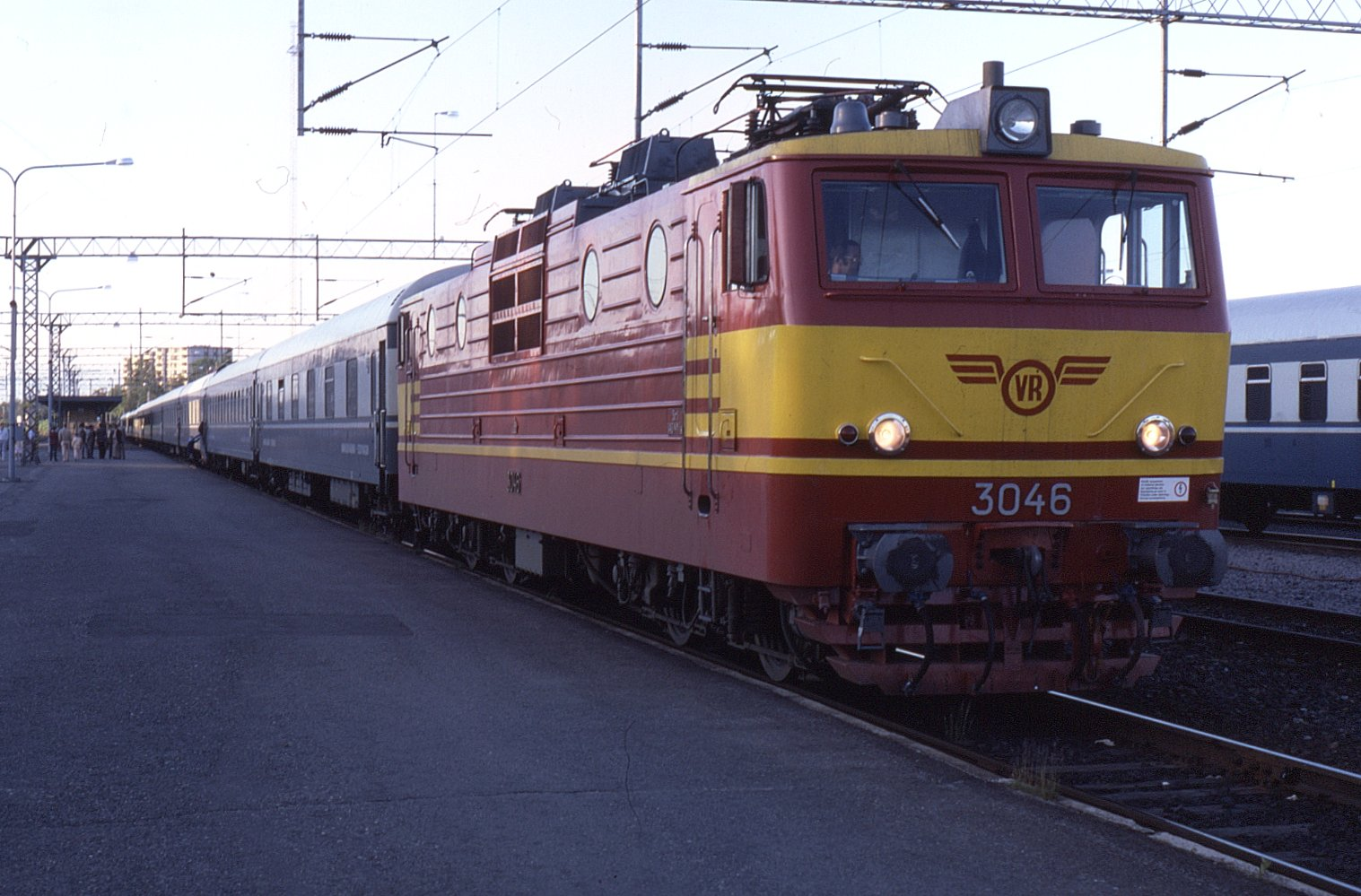
Sr1 3046 in its second livery at Oulu, 14 June 1986

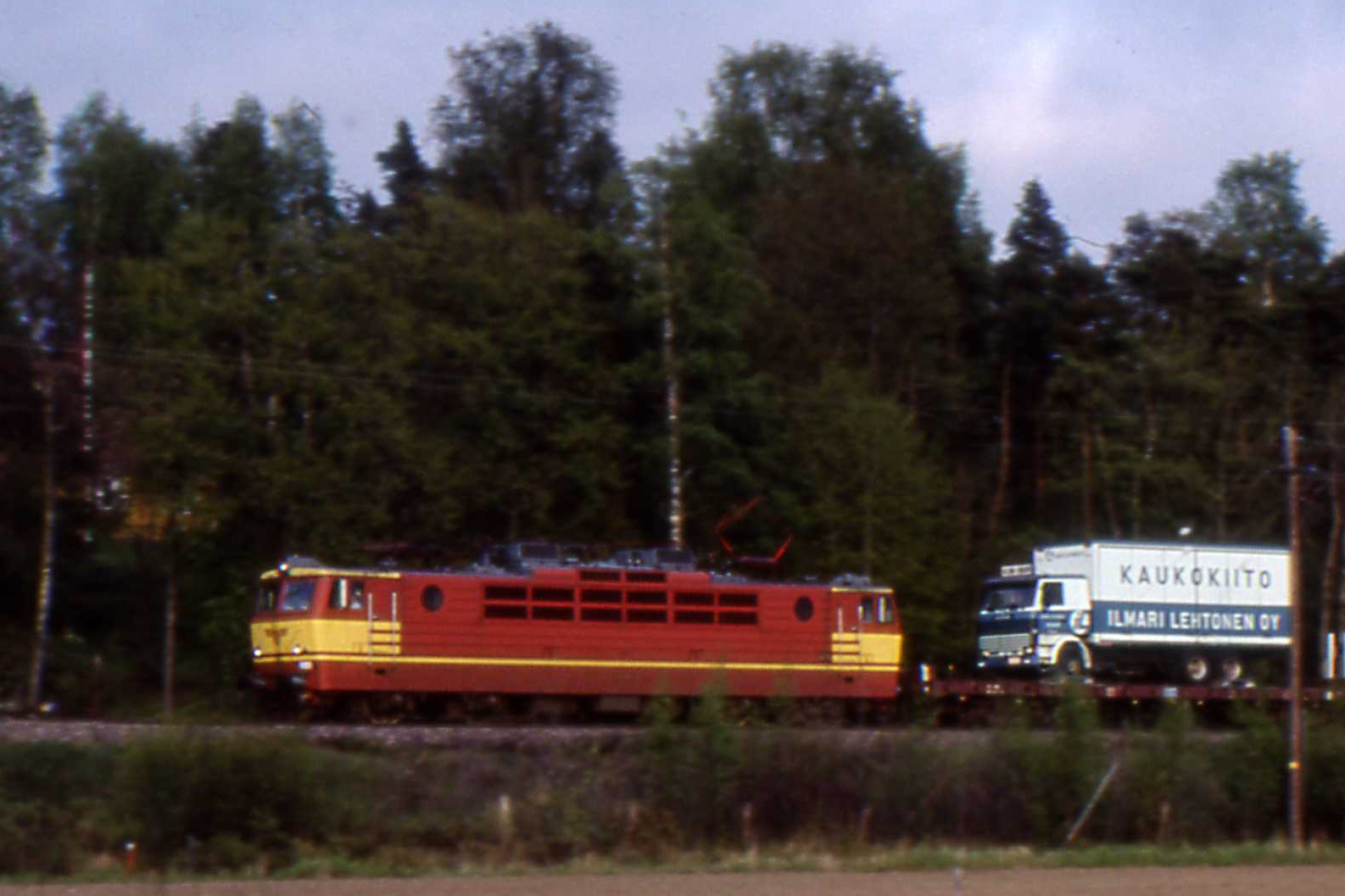
A Sr1 hauling a freight train in its second livery in 1987

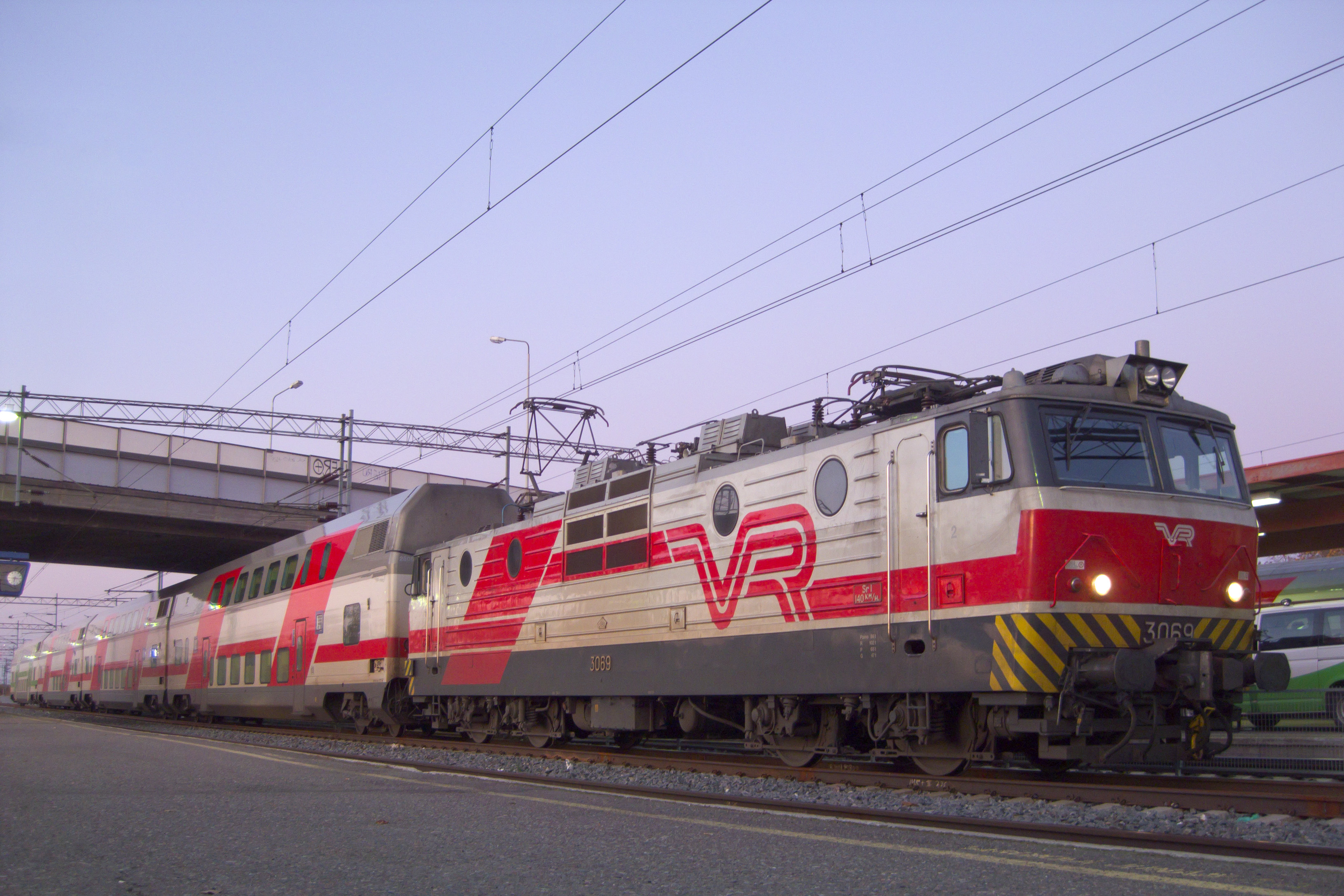
Sr1 3069 in a white-red VR livery

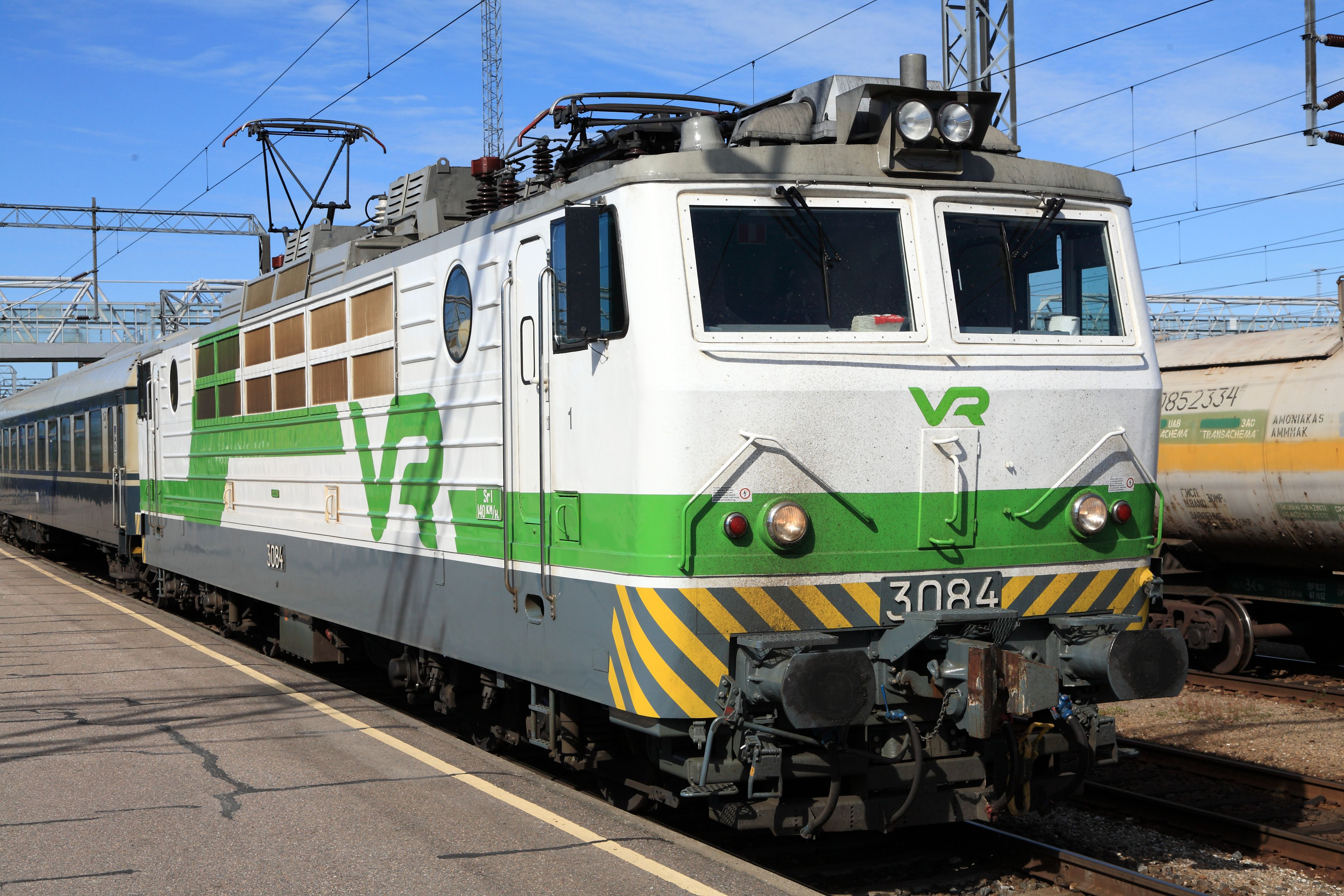
Sr1 3084 in a white-green VR livery

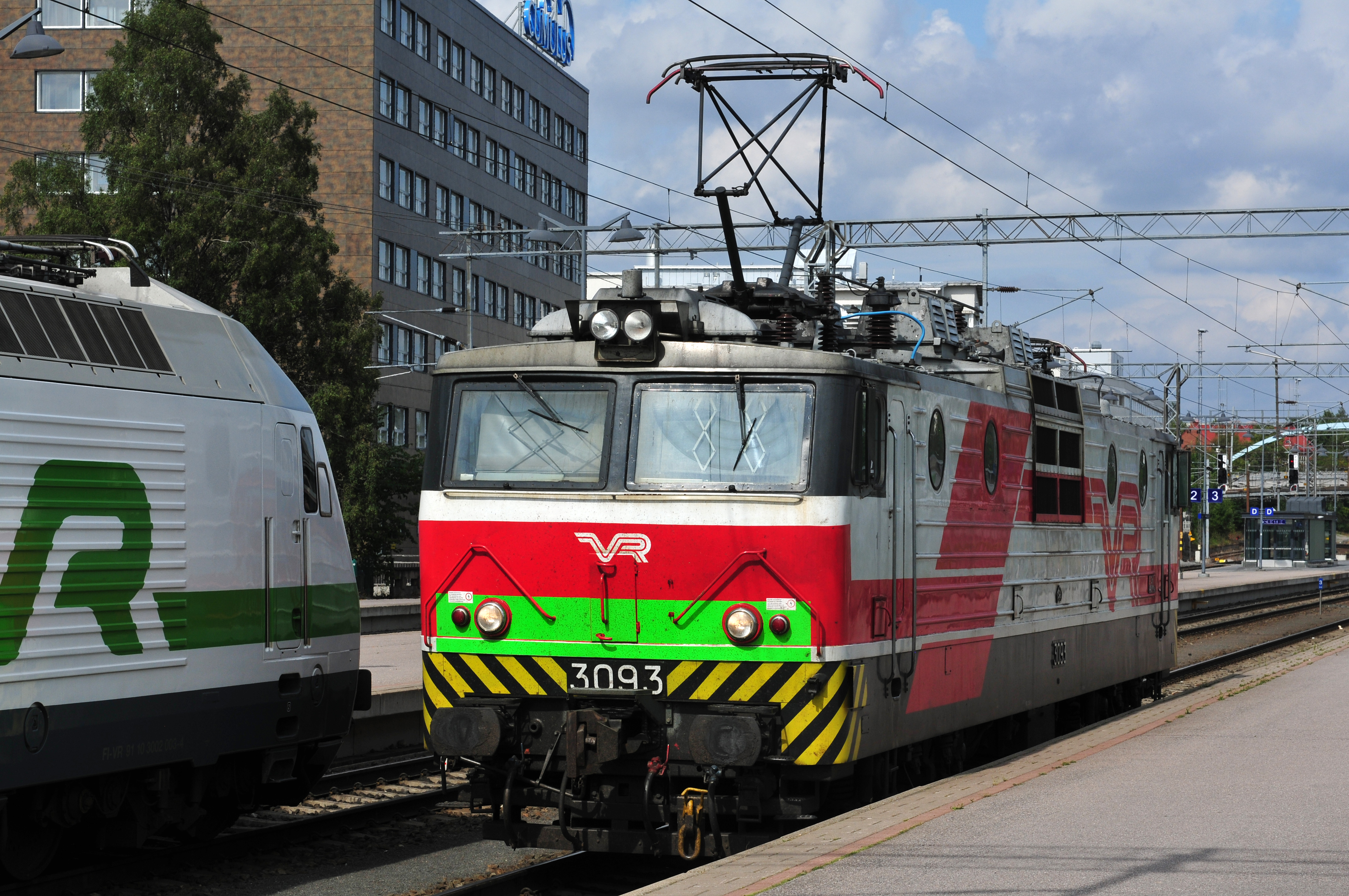
Sr1 3093 in a white-red VR livery with safety tape

== Technical information ==
Electrical equipment for the locomotives was supplied by the Finnish company Oy Strömberg (later part of ABB).

Locomotives number 3098–3110 were rebuilt with new bogies allowing a higher maximum speed (160 km/h) in the 1990s (3111 and 3112 were originally built for this speed), but since 2003 they have been restored back to the original top speed due to the speed being raised at the expense of tractive effort (possibly the delivery of the faster Sr2 class also had an effect). The last Sr1 to be equipped with bogies allowing 160 km/h was number 3107.

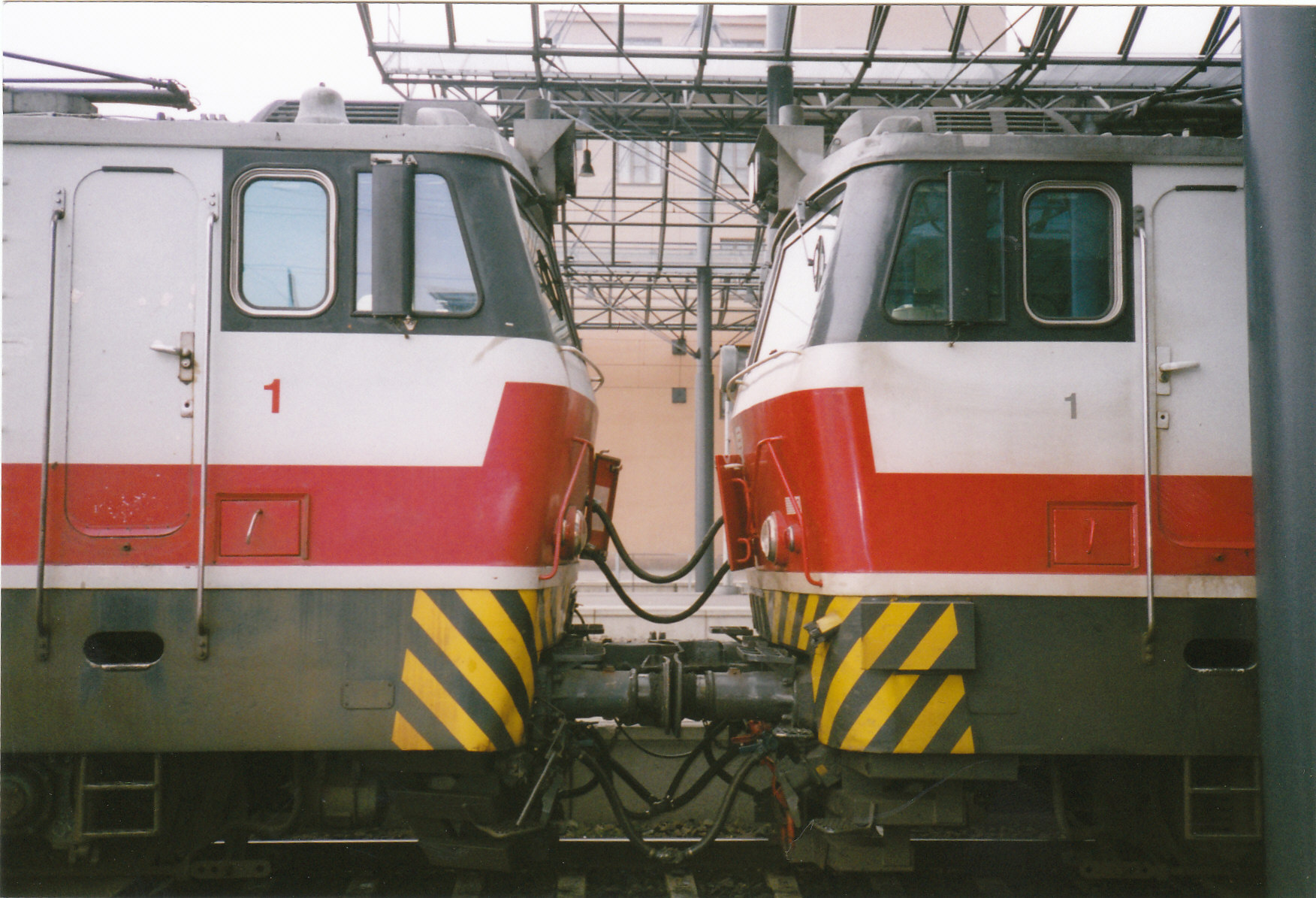
Two Sr1 locomotives operating in multiple-unit train control

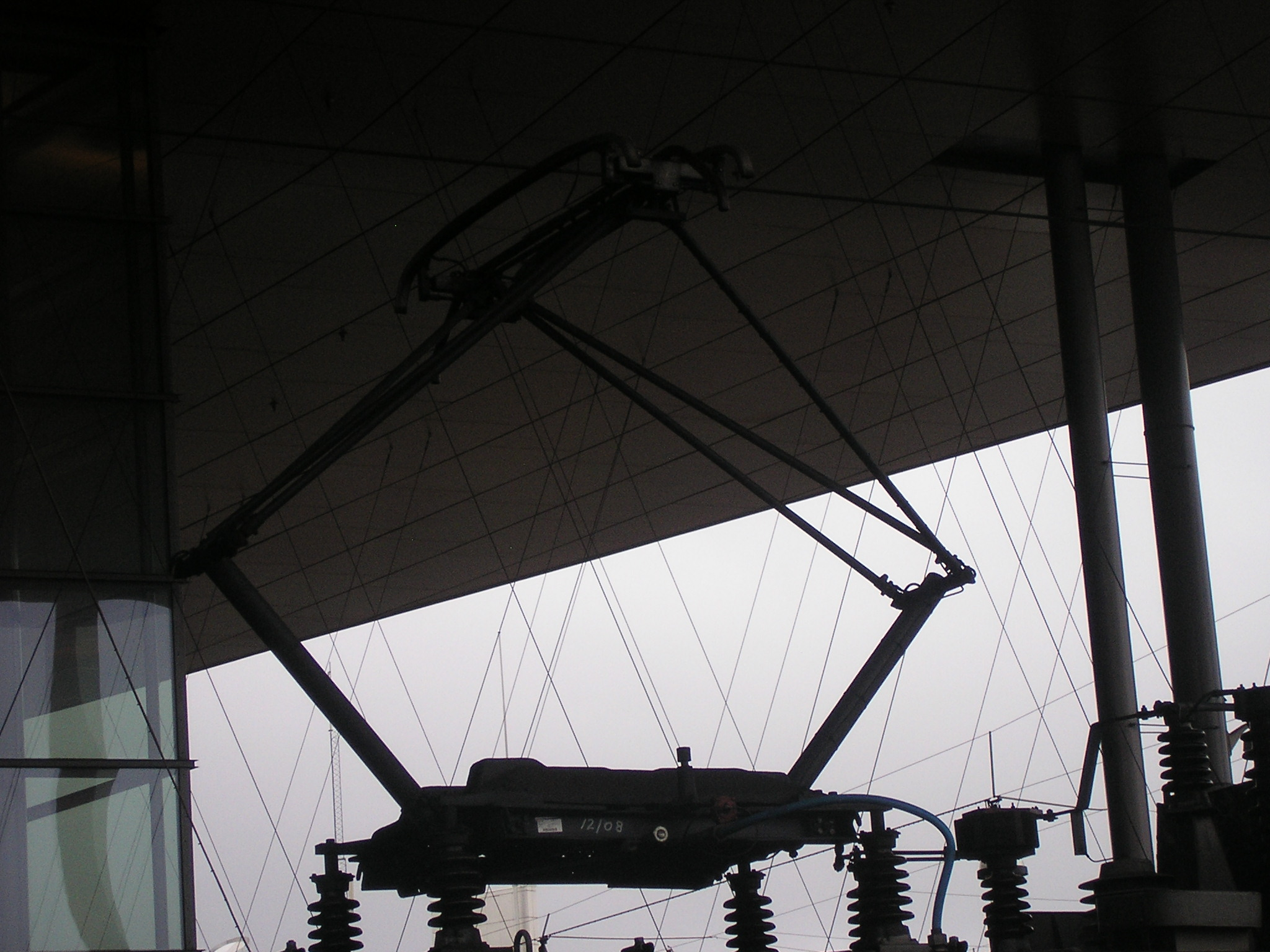
Pantograph of Sr1

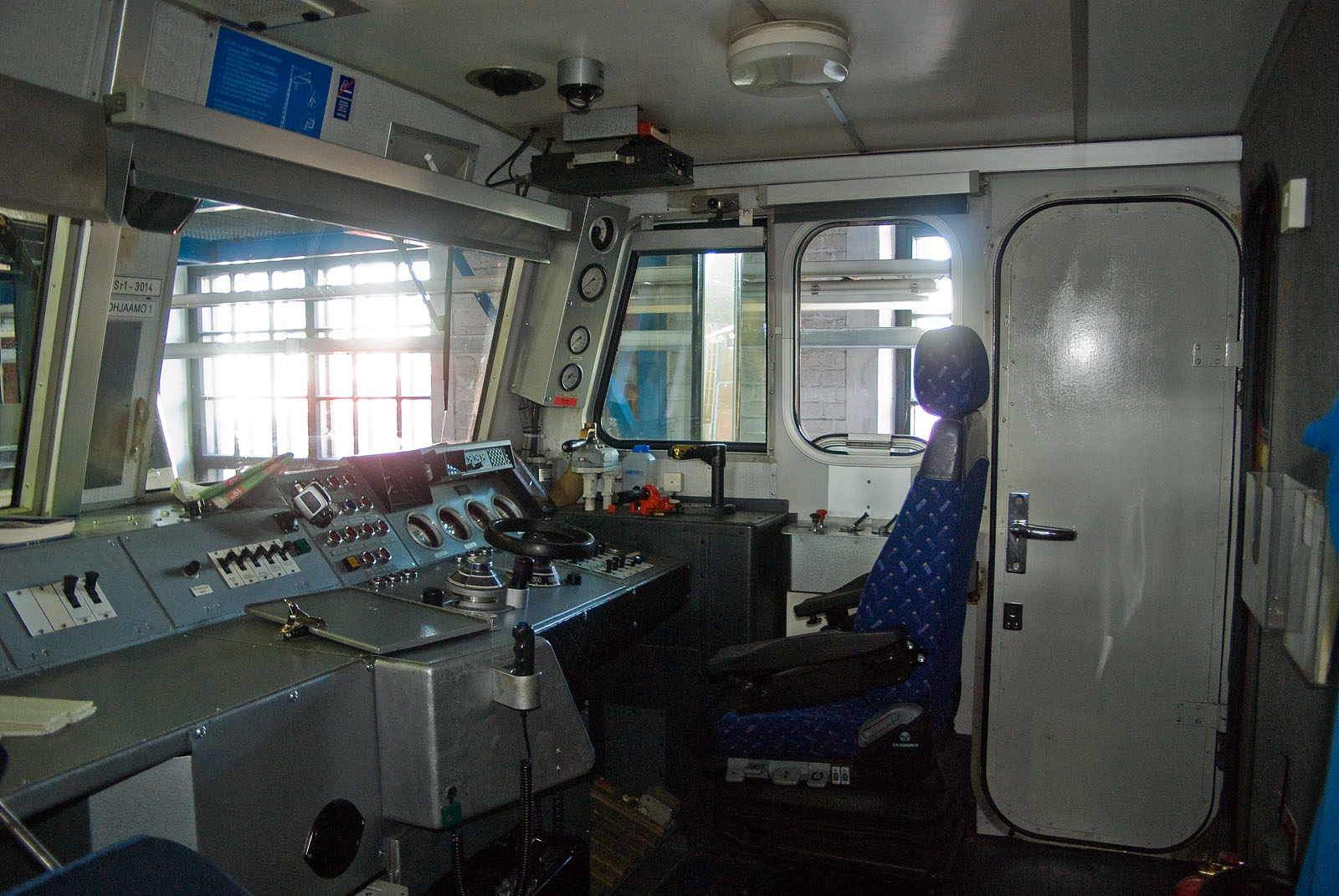
Driving cab of Sr1

== Incidents and accidents ==
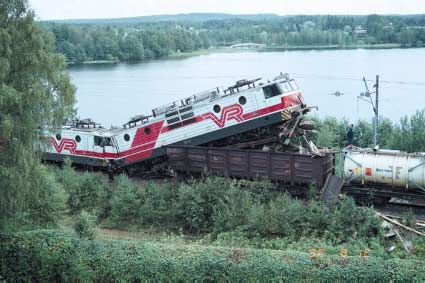
Collision of trains with Sr1 locomotives

Three Sr1 class locomotives have been damaged beyond repair and withdrawn from service: number 3048 in Jokela in 1996, number 3089 in Jyväskylä in 1998 and number 3101 in Siuro in 2011. Five other locomotives have also been involved in accidents, but have been rebuilt or repaired afterwards.

== Withdrawal and replacement ==
In December 2013 VR announced an order for 80 new electric locomotives to replace the Sr1 Class. The new Sr3 class locomotives, of the Siemens Vectron design, were built in Germany by Siemens. The new locomotives are scheduled to be delivered between 2017 and 2026, resulting in the withdrawal of the Sr1 class.

== See also ==
Sr1 locomotive hauling an Intercity train departs Joensuu railway station

- VR Class Sr2
- VR Class Sr3
