= Fenniarail Class Dr18 =

Class Dr18
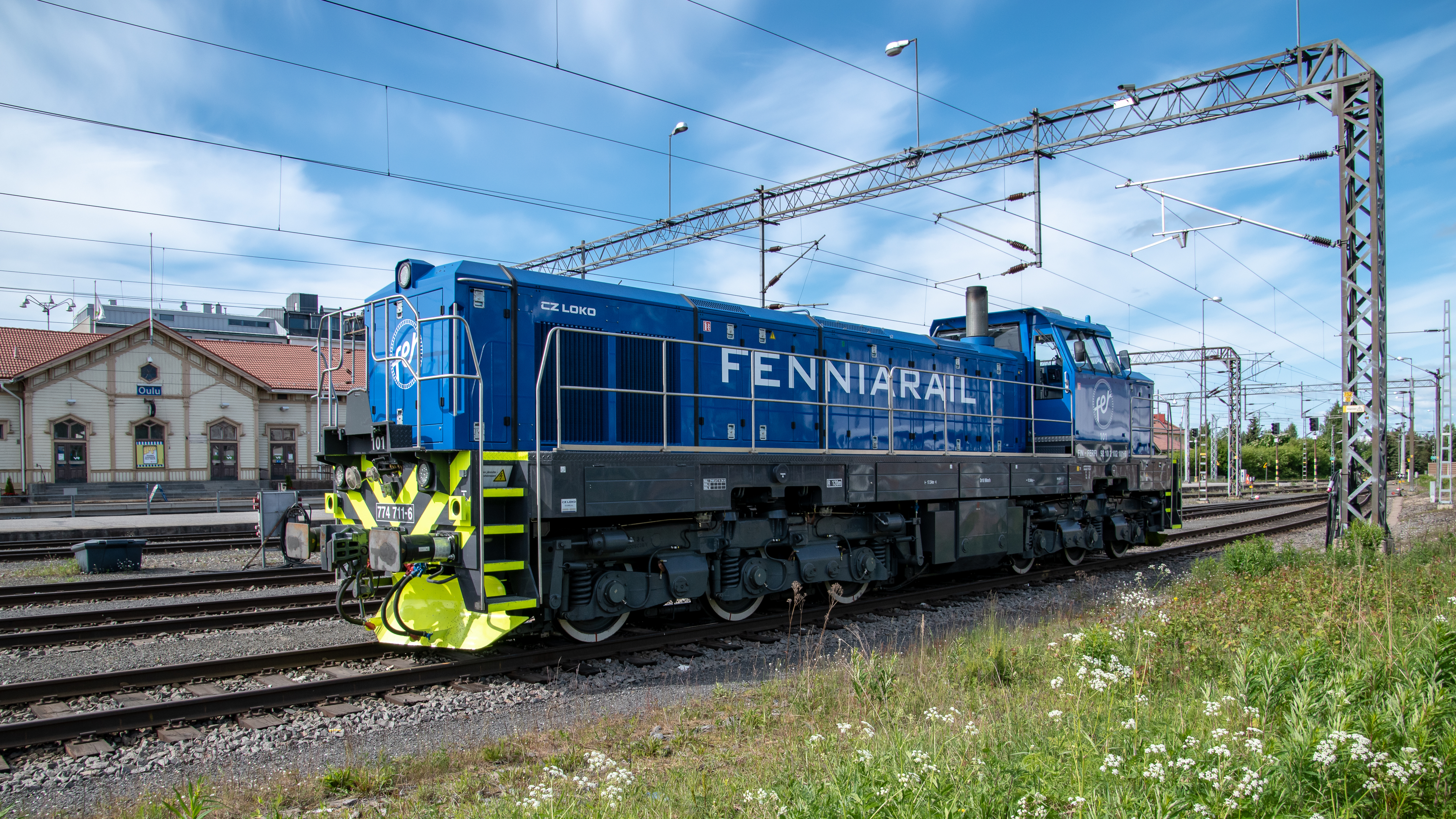
- Dr18 at Oulu railway station in June 2018
Type and origin
- Power type: Diesel-electric
- Builder: CZ Loko
- Total produced: 6
Specifications
- Configuration
  - UIC: Co′Co′
- Gauge: 1,524 mm (5 ft)
- Length: 17.36 m (56 ft 11 in)
- Width: 3.07 m (10 ft 1 in)
- Height: 4.448 m (14 ft 7 in)
- Axle load: 20 t (20 long tons; 22 short tons)
- Loco weight: 120 t (120 long tons; 130 short tons)
- Fuel type: Diesel
- Prime mover: Caterpillar 3512C HD
- Transmission: AC/DC
Performance figures
- Maximum speed: 90 km/h (56 mph)
- Power output: 1,550 kW (2,080 hp)
- Tractive effort: 391 kN (88,000 lbf)
Career
- Operators: Fenniarail
- Class: Dr18
- Number in class: 6
- Numbers: 101–106
- Locale: Finland
- Disposition: In service

The Fenniarail Class Dr18 locomotive is a diesel-electric locomotive used by Fenniarail Oy in freight transport in Finland.

The locomotive is a Finnish variant of the CZ Loko Class 774.7, which in turn is a modernised version of older Czech locomotives (T669). They have been converted from standard to broad gauge, which was possible since the model was prepared for usage in the Soviet Union.
