= Fenniarail =

Finnish freight rail operator

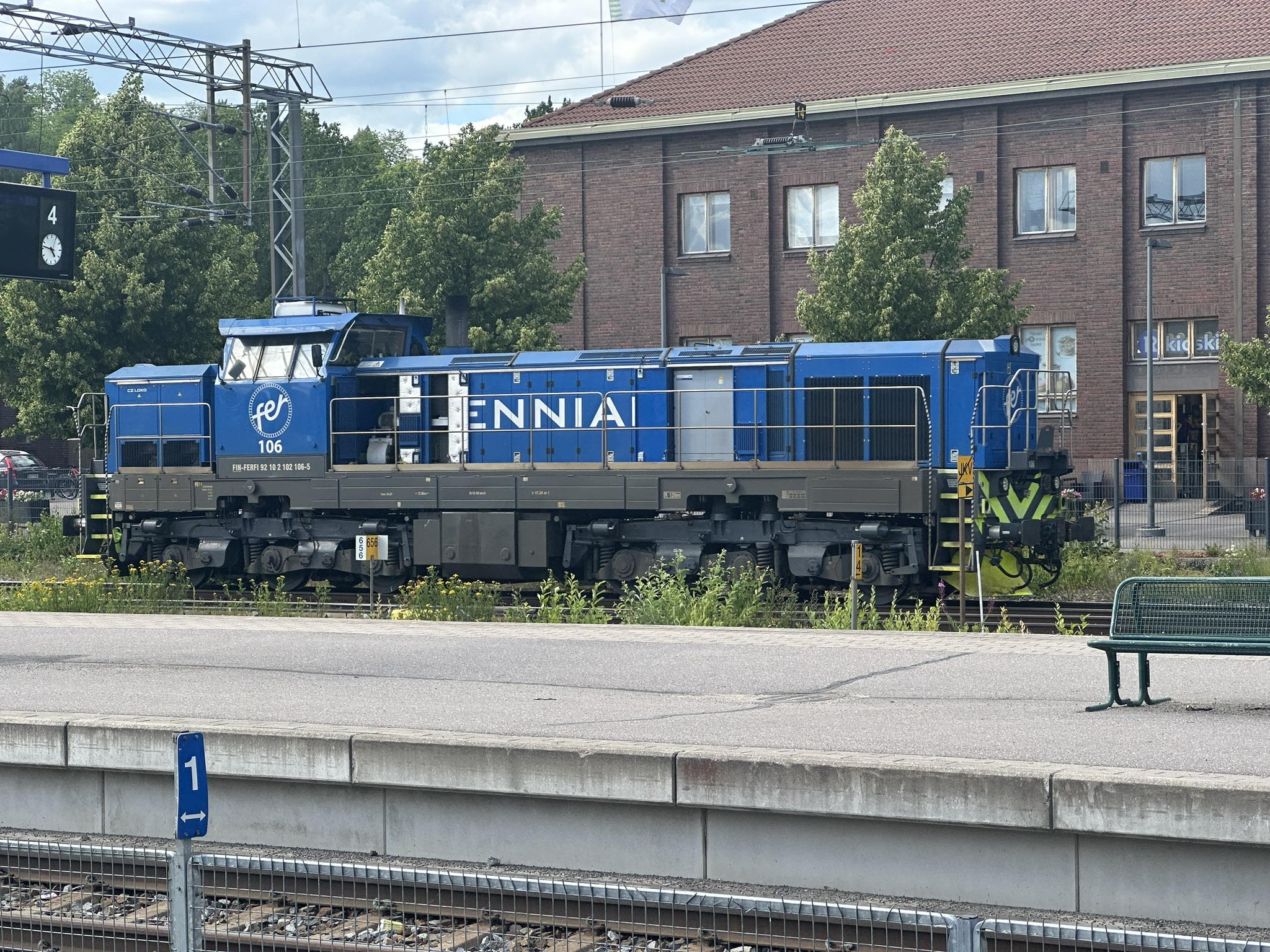
- Fenniarail Class Dr18 diesel locomotive in Lahti, Finland in 2024
- Type: Open access operator
- Industry: Rail transport
- Founded: 2015
- Area served: Finland
- Website: fenniarail.fi

Fenniarail is a private Finnish freight railway operator. The company operates using six class Dr18 diesel locomotives and three class Sr3 electric locomotives, and has two more class Sr3 locomotives on order that are expected to be delivered in 2027.

== History ==
Fenniarail was granted its operating certificate in March 2015. In July 2016 it commenced its first contract to haul sawn wood products from Kemijärvi to the port of Oulu.

In January 2018, Fenniarail's operations increased its contracted freight volumes fourfold with the a contract to haul 30 000 wagonloads annually of imported birch from the Russian border at Vainikkala to UPM's paper mills at Kaukaa and Kymi. In October 2018 transport regulator Trafi upheld a complaint by Fenniarail over pricing for shunting services at the border, where VR Group had a monopoly.

In 2019, the company had a market share of less than two percent, with the state-owned VR Group having the rest of the market.

In 2026, the company announced that it would be moving its headquarters to Kouvola, Finland, where it is constructing a €6.4 million facility to house its traffic and maintenance operations.
