= List of Finnish municipalities without scheduled railway services =

This is a list of Finnish municipalities without passenger rail services. The list includes all municipalities down to those with approximately 4,000 in population.

Municipality	Population
Porvoo (Borgå)	50,345
Lohja (Lojo)	46,929
Rauma (Raumo)	39,793
Nurmijärvi	39,382
Kaarina (S:t Karins)	33,449
Ylöjärvi	32,962
Kangasala	31,743
Vihti (Vichtis)	29,224
Raisio (Reso)	24,182
Valkeakoski	21,135
Kurikka	20,922
Sipoo (Sibbo)	20,675
Hamina (Fredrikshamn)	20,280
Lieto (Lundo)	19,846
Korsholm (Mustasaari)	19,430
Pirkkala (Birkala)	19,377
Naantali (Nådendal)	19,250
Laukaa (Laukas)	18,899
Heinola	18,878
Äänekoski	18,871
Forssa	17,021
Kuusamo	15,193
Uusikaupunki (Nystad)	15,685
Pargas (Parainen)	15,225
Loviisa (Lovisa)	14,873
Kontiolahti (Kontiolax)	14,847
Kauhajoki	13,352
Ulvila (Ulvsby)	13,009
Kalajoki	12,393
Ilmajoki (Ilmola)	12,184
Mariehamn (Maarianhamina)	11,775
Eura	11,732
Kankaanpää	11,484
Paimio (Pemar)	10,872
Hämeenkyrö (Tavastkyro)	10,500
Sotkamo	10,379
Muurame	10,171
Liminka (Limingo)	10,149
Huittinen (Vittis)	10,075
Ii (Ijo)	9,889
Alajärvi	9,712
Leppävirta	9,636
Saarijärvi	9,406
Masku	9,546
Närpes (Närpiö)	9,489
Eurajoki (Euraåminne)	9,452
Karkkila (Högfors)	8,809
Somero	8,827
Laitila (Letala)	8,656
Sodankylä	8,435
Kuhmo	8,330
Pöytyä (Pöytis)	8,325
Keminmaa	8,143
Asikkala	8,142
Pudasjärvi	7,988
Suomussalmi	7,881
Loppi (Loppis)	7,865
Mynämäki (Virmo)	7,749
Nykarleby (Uusikaarlepyy)	7,456
Ikaalinen (Ikalis)	6,993
Inari (Enare)	6,916
Haapavesi	6,835
Säkylä	6,802
Outokumpu	6,792
Tyrnävä	6,727
Virrat (Virdois)	6,727
Kimitoön (Kemiönsaari)	6,711
Vörå (Vöyri)	6,607
Kristinestad (Kristiinankaupunki)	6,599
Kronoby (Kruunupyy)	6,503
Nilsiä	6,528
Pälkäne	6,496
Kittilä	6,449
Viitasaari	6,278
Rusko	6,252
Juva (Jockas)	6,208
Nummi-Pusula	6,175
Tammela	6,063
Malax (Maalahti)	5,463
Kangasniemi	5,455
Larsmo (Luoto)	5,348
Siikalatva	5,305
Siikajoki	5,242
Jokioinen (Jockis)	5,191
Pyhtää (Pyttis)	5,184
Teuva (Östermark)	5,166
Ruokolahti (Ruokolax)	5,096
Pornainen (Borgnäs)	5,064
Jomala	5,055
Sievi	4,983
Ilomantsi (Ilomants)	4,964
Askola	4,962
Urjala	4,796
Nousiainen (Nousis)	4,733
Taipalsaari	4,714
Juuka (Juga)	4,700
Luumäki	4,659
Pielavesi	4,496
Tohmajärvi	4,470
Joutsa	4,459
Vesilahti (Vesilax)	4,392
Ruovesi	4,368
Polvijärvi	4,295
Kaustinen (Kaustby)	4,273
Pihtipudas	4,048
Karstula	4,018
Taivalkoski	4,005

== See also ==
- List of Finnish municipalities by population
- VR Group
- Rail transport in Finland
