= VR Class Dr12 =

Class of Finnish diesel-electric locomotives

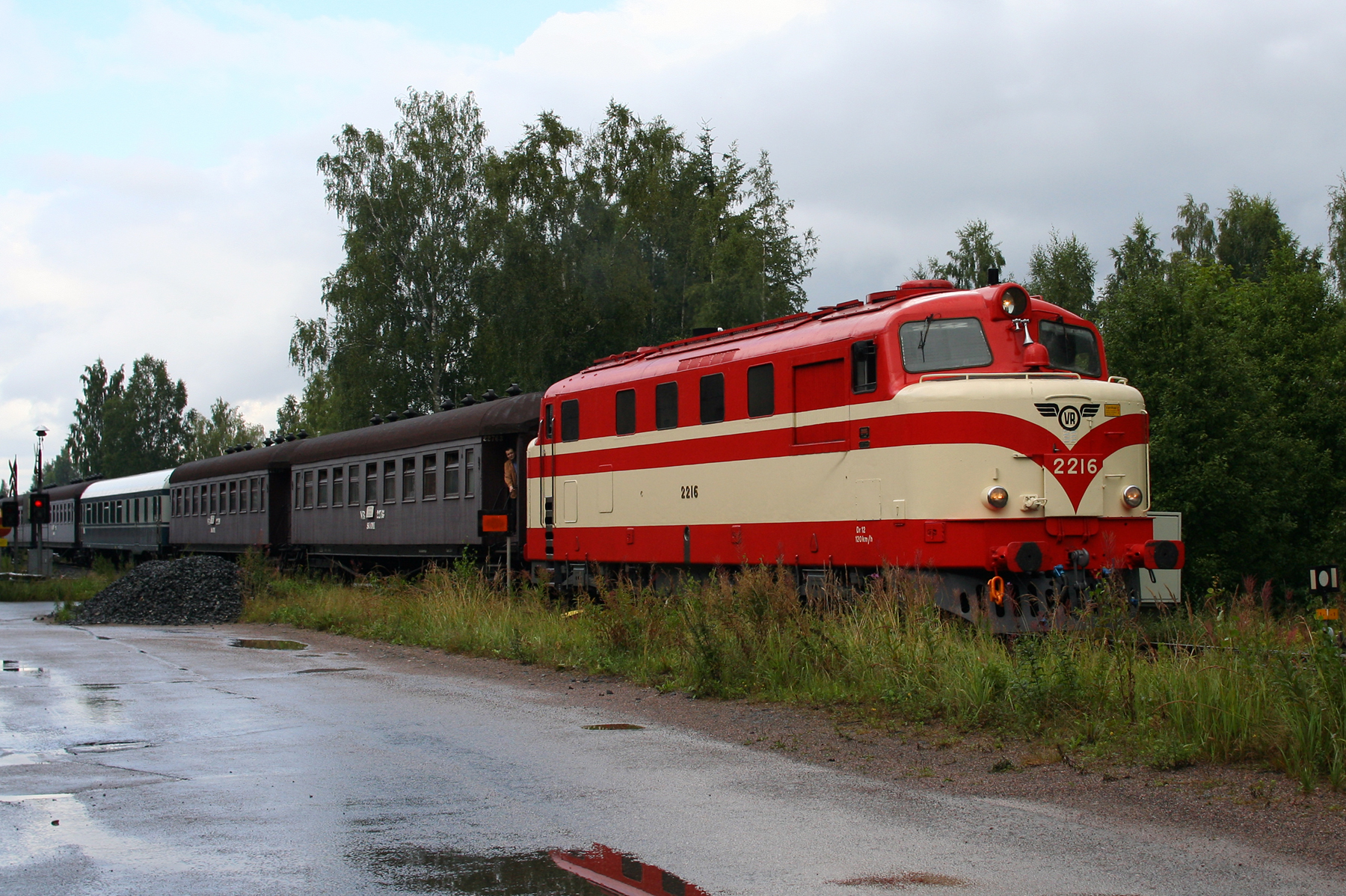
- VR Class Dr12 diesel locomotive (no. 2216)
Type and origin
- Power type: Diesel-electric locomotive
- Builder: Valmet / Lokomo
- Serial number: 2200–2241
- Build date: 1959–1963
- Total produced: 42
Specifications
- Configuration
  - AAR: C-C
  - UIC: Co′Co′
- Gauge: 1,524 mm (5 ft)
- Wheel diameter: 1,180 mm (3 ft 10 in)
- Length: 18.560 m (60 ft 11 in)
- Width: 3.200 m (10 ft 6 in)
- Height: 4.660 m (15 ft 3 in)
- Axle load: 20.3 tonnes (20.0 long tons; 22.4 short tons)
- Loco weight: 121.8 tonnes (119.9 long tons; 134.3 short tons)
- Fuel type: Diesel
- Fuel capacity: 4,200 litres
- Prime mover: Tampella / MAN V8V22/30
- Transmission: Diesel electric
Performance figures
- Maximum speed: 120 km/h (75 mph)
- Power output: 1,400 kW (1,900 hp)
Career
- Operators: VR
- Nicknames: Huru, Hämeen Huru, Vintti-Huru
- First run: 1955
- Withdrawn: 1972–1990
- Disposition: 2 preserved, others scrapped

VR Class Dr12 (original designation Hr12) was a heavy diesel-electric locomotive of Valtionrautatiet (VR, Finnish State Railways). A total of 42 locomotives were ordered from two manufacturers, Valmet and Lokomo, between 1956 and 1961. The locomotives were withdrawn in the early 1990s.

== History ==
=== Order ===
VR ordered the first six then-Hr12 locomotives in 1956, and they entered into service three years later. In 1959, the director of VR at the time, Erkki Aalto, wanted to cancel the order, claiming that the locomotives were outdated and more expensive but less efficient compared to other options. In the end, VR ended up ordering 36 additional Dr12 locomotives, as well as a total of 54 class Dr13 locomotives that were based on an Alstom design but license-built by Valmet and Lokomo in Finland.

=== Service ===
Dr12 was intended for use on heavy passenger and freight trains. As the timetables got tighter, the acceleration of the Dr12 turned out to be insufficient for passenger trains.

The locomotives were based at Tampere depot, where they initially pulled express trains and heavy freight trains between Helsinki and Seinäjoki and between Riihimäki and Kouvola. The electrification of the main lines and the upgrade of the tracks allowed the operating area of the Dr12s to expand to unelectrified lines in the East and North, where they replaced the VR Class Hr1 and VR Class Tr1 locomotives.

=== Withdrawal ===
By 1980 Finland's major railway lines had been electrified, which drastically reduced the need for diesel traction. In the end Dr12 locomotives were used in Turku and Tampere areas, including the Turku–Tampere line. The last Dr12 locomotive (no. 2216) was withdrawn after pulling a timber train from Salo to Turku on 19 December 1990. This same locomotive is now preserved and it was used at the VR Group's 150th anniversary in August 2012 on the Hanko–Hyvinkää railway.

== Features ==
When it was introduced, the Dr12 gave drivers a new experience of comfort and forward visibility compared to steam locomotives, but compared to the newer VR Class Dr13, the Dr12 had a heavy axle load and slow acceleration with a top speed of only 120 km/h. The reason for this was that the locomotive turned out to be underpowered. The problem of the top speed was corrected in the last 10 locomotives by changing the transmission in such a way that the technical top speed was increased to 140 km/h, but this feature was never used. As a result, the entire locomotive series had a maximum permissible speed restricted to 120 km/h. However, due to the high axle weight, the Dr12 had good adhesion properties and it was considered to be a reliable and robust locomotive. It was well-suited to heavy trains with relatively low speed requirements.

In addition to the underpowered engine, the second problem of the Dr12 was the heavy axle load, which could damage lightly laid tracks. In practice it could only be used on Western Finland's heavily laid lines.

== Technology ==
Dr12 consisted of two three-axle bogies each of which had one driving motor per axle, on which rested a very rigid steel body with the hardware and the cabins. The locomotive had one large 182-liter 1,800 hp V16 diesel engine mounted in its centre, which was directly connected to the main and auxiliary generator sets. Cabins had safety zones in both ends which were designed to protect the driver and equipment in a collision.

Two locomotives could be connected to be controlled by one set of controls, but this feature was used very rarely.

== Numbering ==
- Years of manufacture (Nos.):
  - 1959 (2200–2205)
  - 1960 (2206–2219)
  - 1961 (2220–2227)
  - 1962 (2228–2231)
  - 1963 (2232–2241)

== Gallery ==
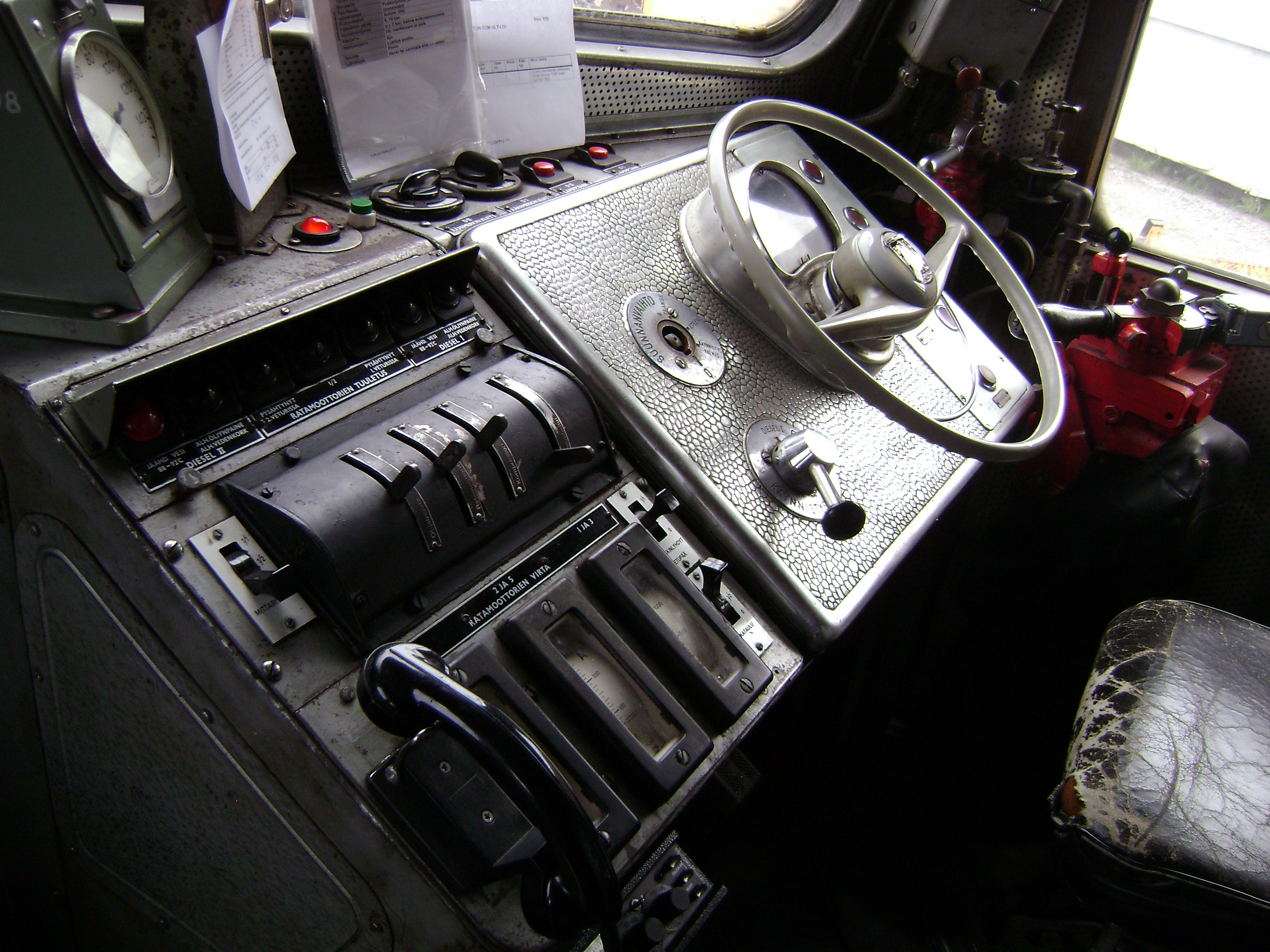
Dr12's Cab controls

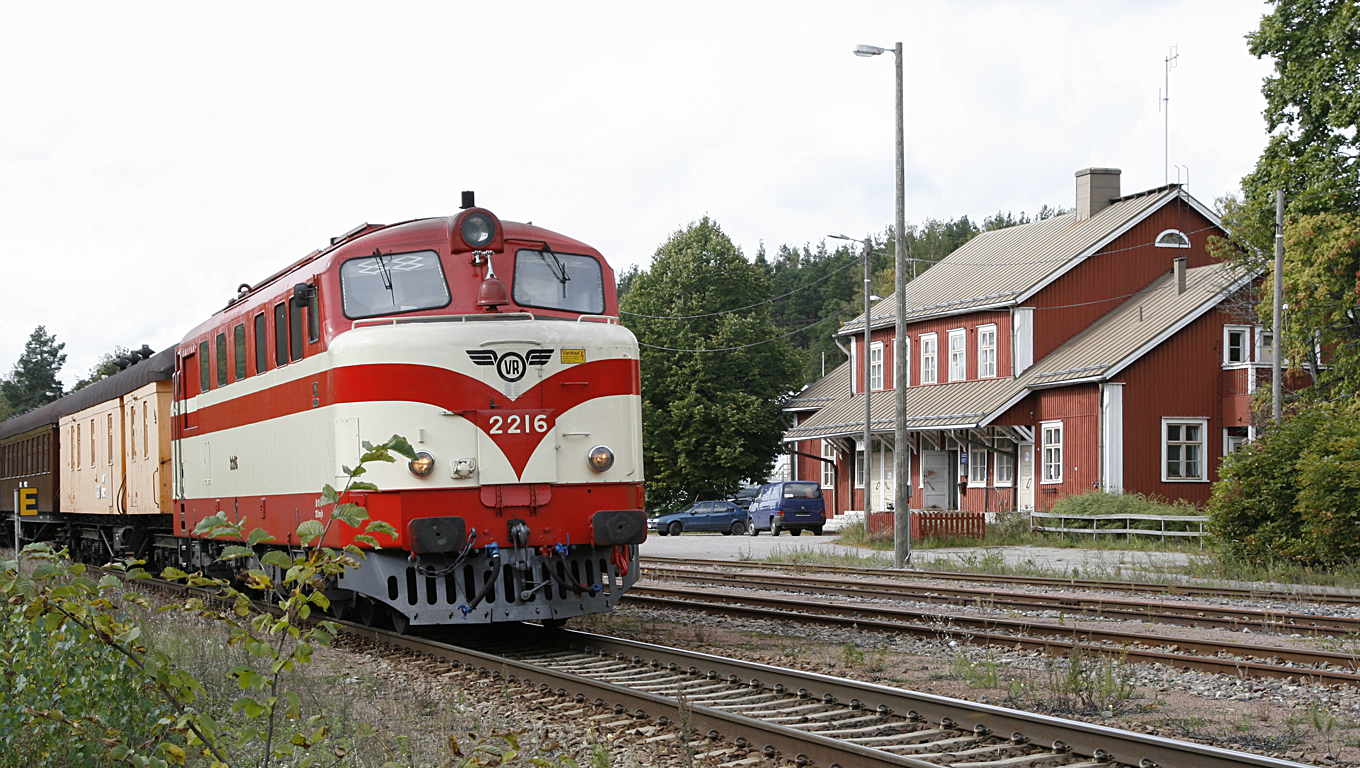
Dr12 diesel locomotive no. 2216 with a heritage train at Lohja railway station

== See also ==
- Finnish Railway Museum
- Heritage railways
- History of rail transport in Finland
- Jokioinen Museum Railway
- List of Finnish locomotives
- List of heritage railways
- List of railway museums Worldwide
- Restored trains
- VR Group
