= VR Class Dr13 =

Class of Finnish diesel locomotives

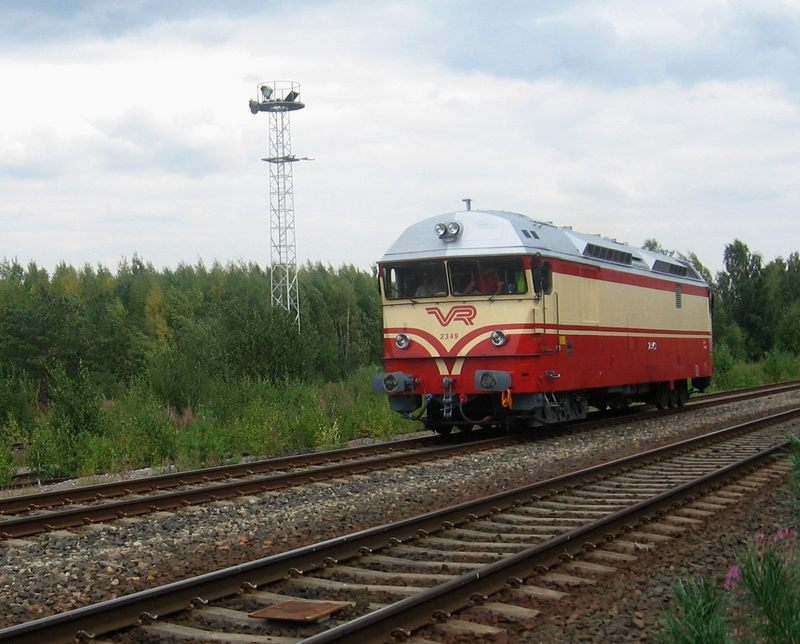
- VR Class Dr13 museum locomotive (no. 2349) at Finnish Railway Museum, Hyvinkää
Type and origin
- Power type: Diesel locomotive
- Builder: Alstom, Lokomo, Valmet
- Serial number: 2301–2354
- Build date: 1962–1965
- Total produced: 54
Specifications
- Configuration
  - AAR: C-C
  - UIC: C'C'
- Gauge: 1,524 mm (5 ft)
- Wheel diameter: 1,180 mm (3 ft 10 in)
- Wheelbase: 14.000 m (45 ft 11 in)
- Length: 18.576 m (60 ft 11 in)
- Width: 3.094 m (10 ft 2 in)
- Height: 3.504 m (11 ft 6 in)
- Axle load: 16.4 tonnes (16.1 long tons; 18.1 short tons)
- Loco weight: 99 tonnes (97 long tons; 109 short tons)
- Fuel type: Diesel
- Prime mover: 2 × MGO V16 BSHR
- Engine type: V16 diesel engine
- Cylinders: 16
- Transmission: Diesel electric
Performance figures
- Maximum speed: 140 km/h (87 mph)
- Power output: 2,060 kW (2,760 hp)
Career
- Operators: VR
- Nicknames: "Alsti" "Alstikka", "Alspommi", "Myymäläauto" (Mobile shop)
- First run: 24 October 1962
- Withdrawn: June 2000
- Disposition: 2 preserved, no. 2349 at the Finnish Railway Museum, others scrapped

VR Class Dr13 (before 1 January 1976 called Hr13) was a heavy diesel locomotive used by VR Group. The Dr13 was designed by the French company Alstom. The class consisted of 54 locomotives, of which the first two were built by Alstom’s factory in Belfort, France and were shipped to Finland in 1962, while the rest were built in Tampere at the factories of Lokomo (odd numbers) and Valmet (even numbers). The first Dr13 series locomotive came to Finland on 24 October 1962. The Dr13 series was introduced between 1962 and 1963, and the last units were withdrawn by June 2000.

== Design ==
The Dr13 has been the most powerful and the fastest diesel locomotive in VR Group service. It was purchased to complement the VR Class Dr12 locomotives: Dr12 had a heavier axle load and less power. The Dr12 was therefore restricted to use on lines that have been laid for heavier axle loads. Dr13 had a similar engine to the medium-weight Dv12, the Tampella manufactured MGO V16 BSHR / BHSR, but the Dr13 had two of them, each driving its own generator. The 2 locomotives produced in France used engines manufactured by SACM. Dr13 fleet was initially operated in Eastern Finland on freight and passenger rail services, and stationed in Kouvola. As the electrified rail network in Eastern Finland expanded, Dr13 equipment began to be used in Western Finland on unelectrified sections of track.

Instead of the conventional electric motor arrangement, one motor per axle, the locomotive had a somewhat unconventional motor arrangement: two large electric motors, one for each bogie, placed on top of the bogies driving the three axles via an external gearbox. The class initially had a lot of teething problems affecting the battery, radiator and power train. The original French design could not withstand the severe Finnish climate. For instance, hoods had to be fitted in Finland to the air intakes and ventilation grilles on the roof to prevent snow from entering the engines. The locomotive weight was much higher than specified and the driving characteristics were not particularly good. Accordingly, careless driving could result in a bumpy ride on poor sections of track (hence the nickname of "Hyppyheikki" or "Jumping Heikki"). Not all the problems were solved, but this did not detract from the usefulness of the class in trains that needed a lot of power. The last use of the class was pulling trains on the unelectrified line between Tampere and Turku. When the last Dr13s were withdrawn in June 2000, the class had completed almost 40 years service, and the youngest locomotives were 35 years old. Two locomotives of the class were preserved: No. 2349 for the Finnish Railway Museum and No. 2343.

== Nicknames ==
There were several nicknames for the Dr13 including “Alstom" and several based on Alstom: "Alstikka", "Alsti", "Alspommi" and "Ranskatar”(=Frenchwoman). Also, nicknames "Hyppyheikki" (= "Jumping Heikki"), "Kymen Huru", "Marinella", “Myymäläauto” (="Mobile shop") and "Nakkiputka" (=Sausage kiosk) were used. The last two referred to the characteristic looks of the windscreens. When ready for delivery into Finland in Belfort, France, Dr13 No. 2302 was named “Wäinämöinen” by the wife of the President of Finland Mrs Sylvi Kekkonen.

== Numbering ==
Year	Number	Locomotive Numbers	Notes
1962	2	2301, 2302	First Prototypes
1963	16	2303–2318	
1964	17	2319–2334, 2336	
1965	19	2335, 2337–2354	

== Gallery ==
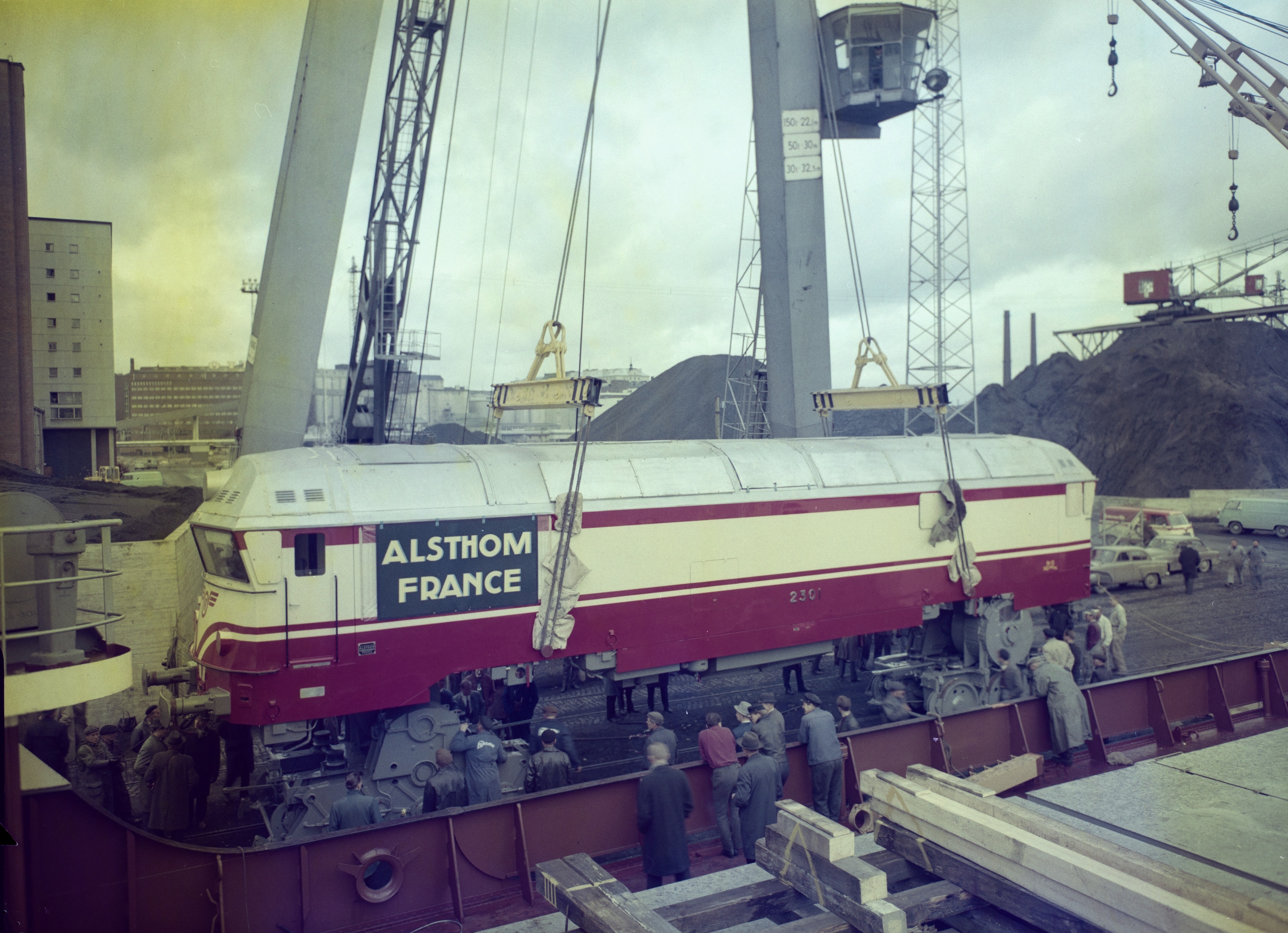
The first Dr13-type locomotive no. 2301 being lifted from a ship at Hanasaari quay in 1962.

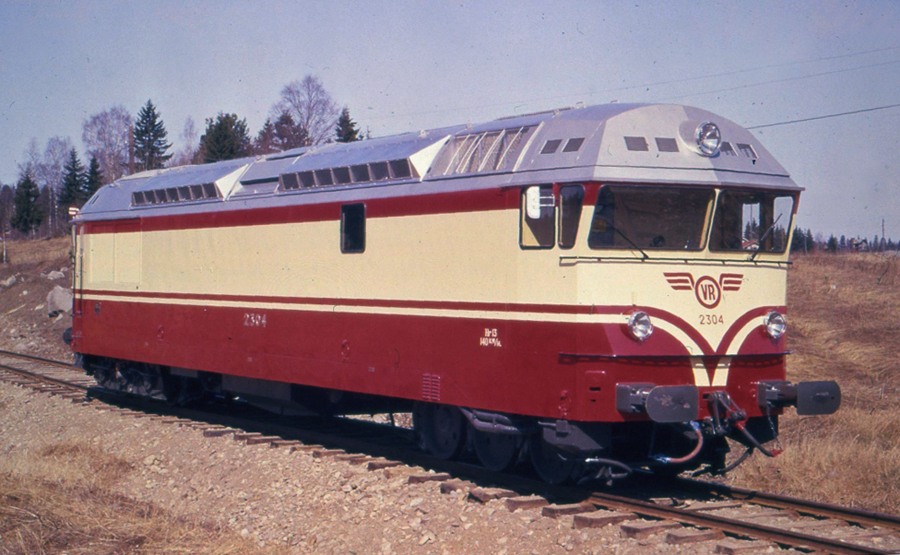
Hr13 no. 2304 in Tampere in 1963.

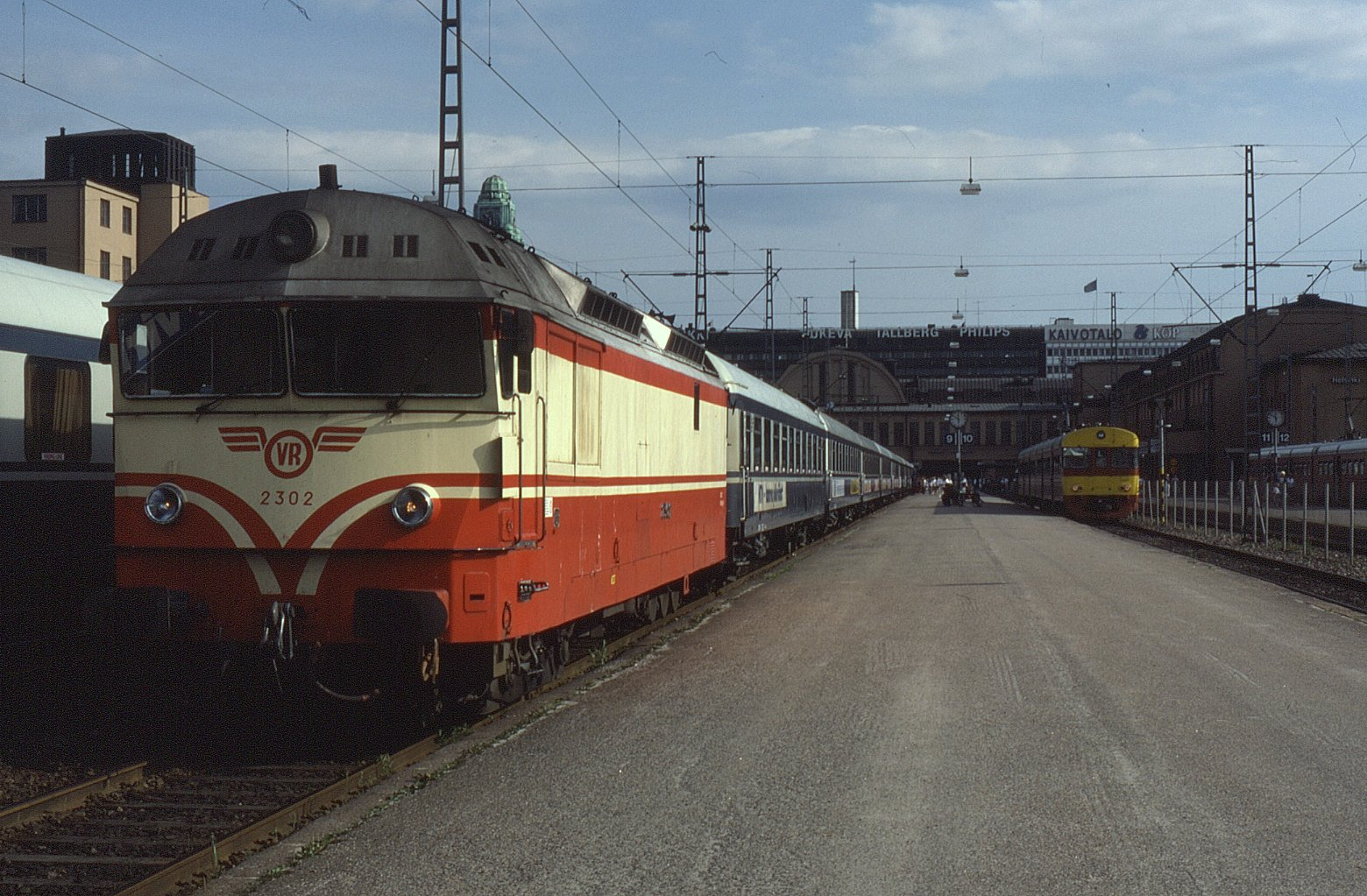
Dr13 no. 2302 seen here at Helsinki railway station on 15 June 1986, is at the head of the 18:02 from Helsinki service to Turku.

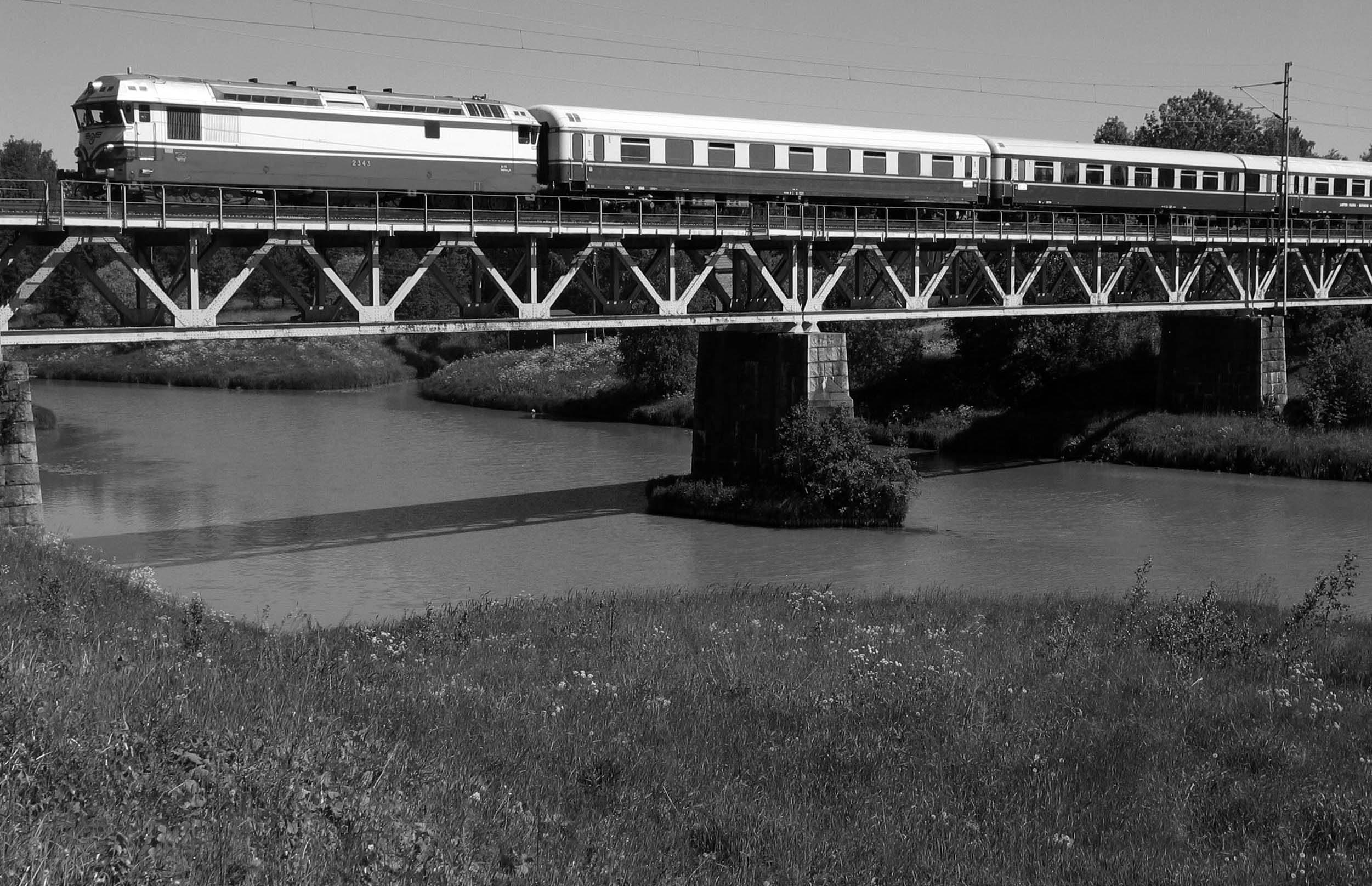
The Helsinki–Turku line was not electrified until 1994. In the years prior, Dr13 locomotives with blue-grey express trains were a regular sight, here seen on the steel bridge over the Paimionjoki river, pulled by Dr13 no. 2343, which is one of the two preserved locomotives.

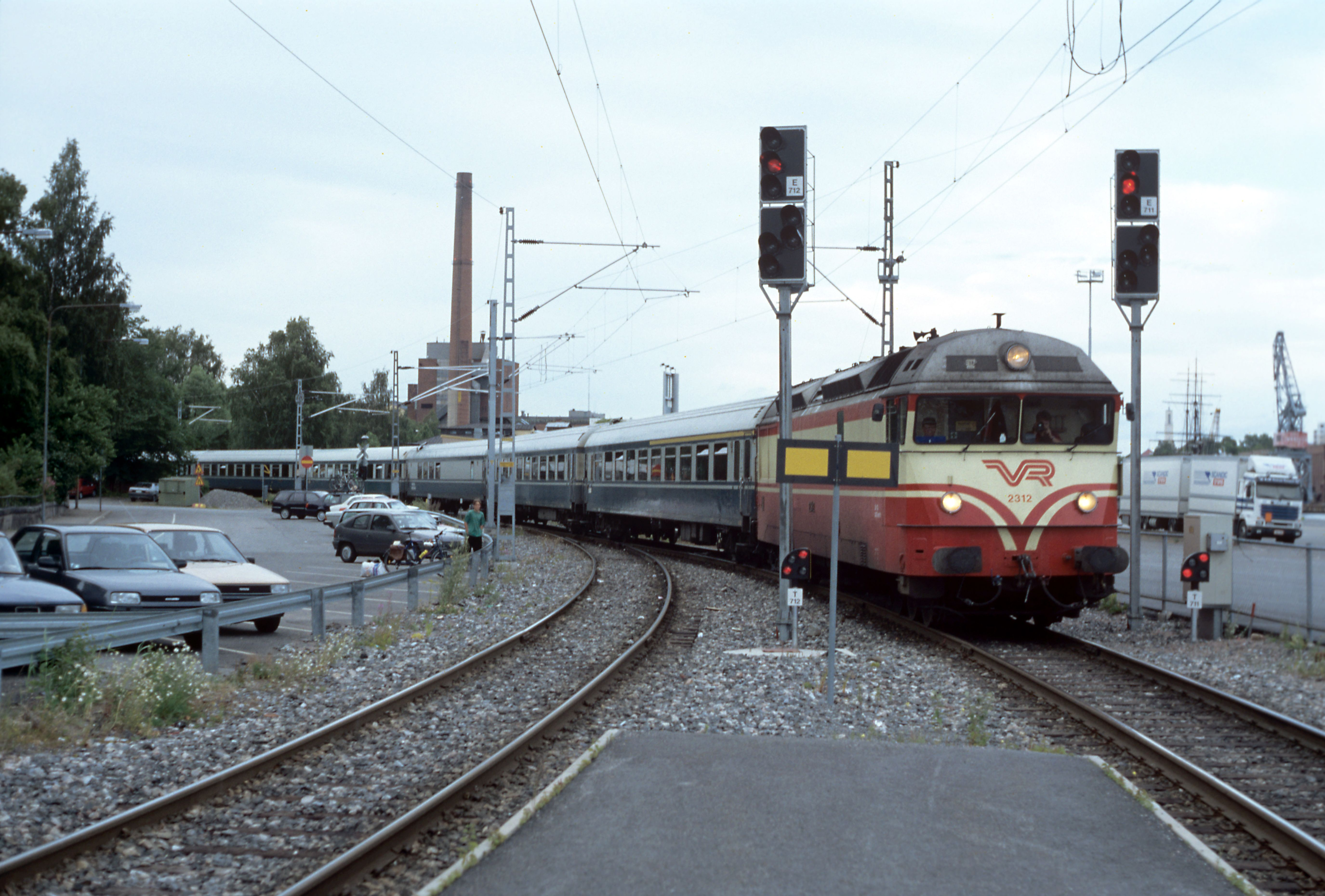
Dr13 locomotive arriving at Turku Harbour railway station in July 1995

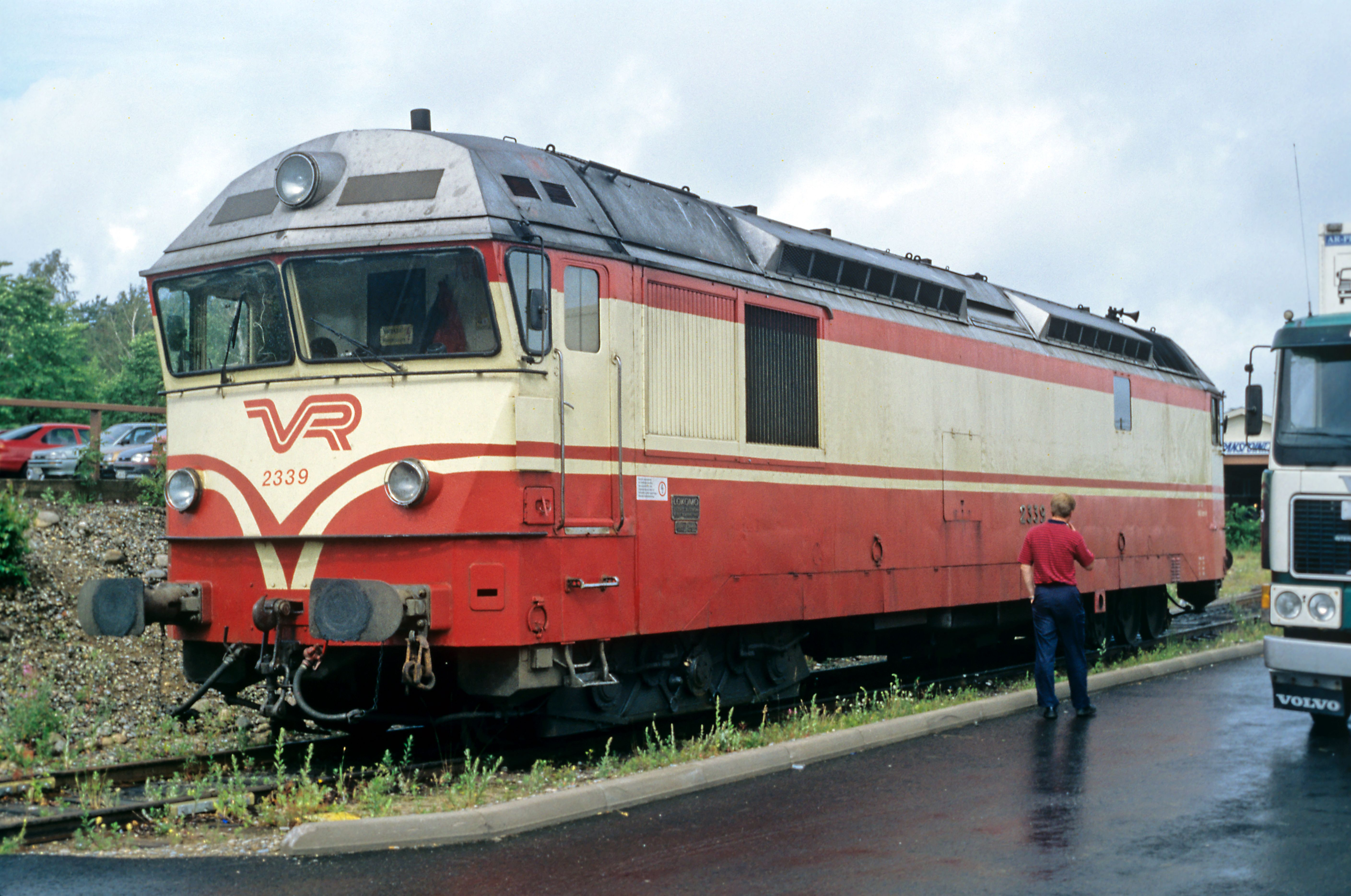
Dr13 no. 2339 at Savonlinna Railway Station in July 1995

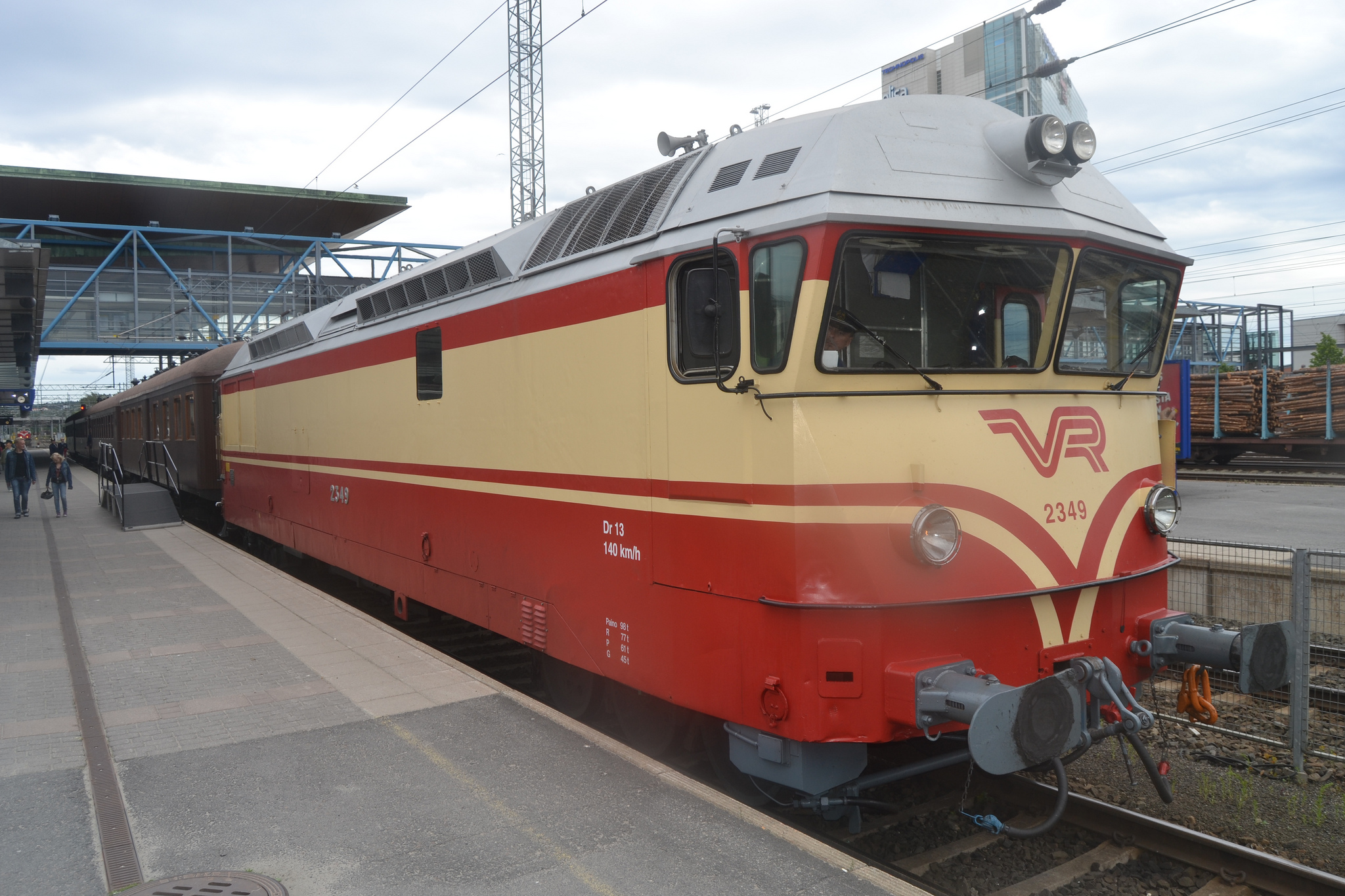
Preserved locomotive Dr13 no. 2349 at Jyväskylä railway station

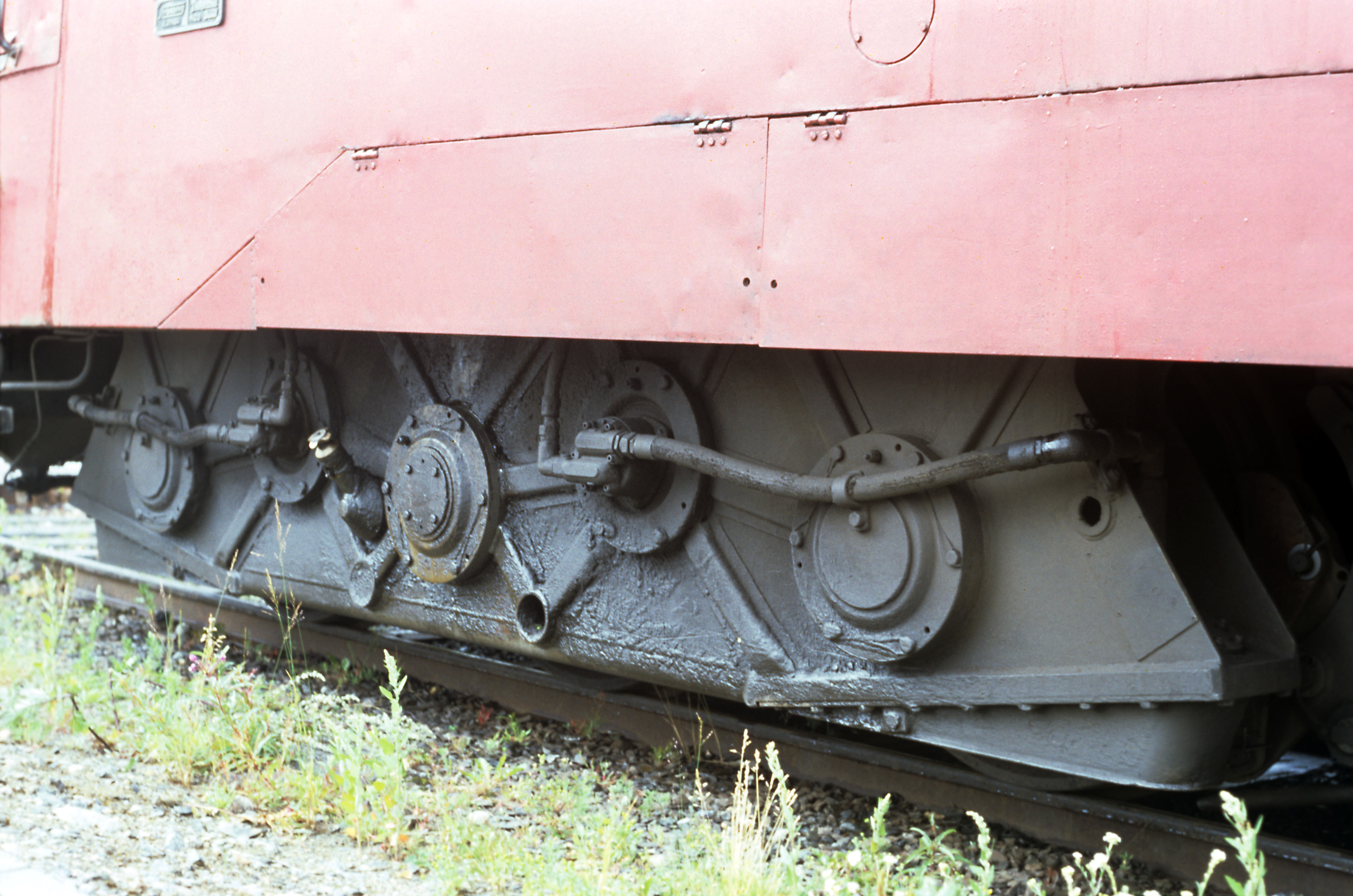
Detail. The final drive is outside the internally mounted wheel sets on one side. Here can be seen the driven side. The gear box is suspended.

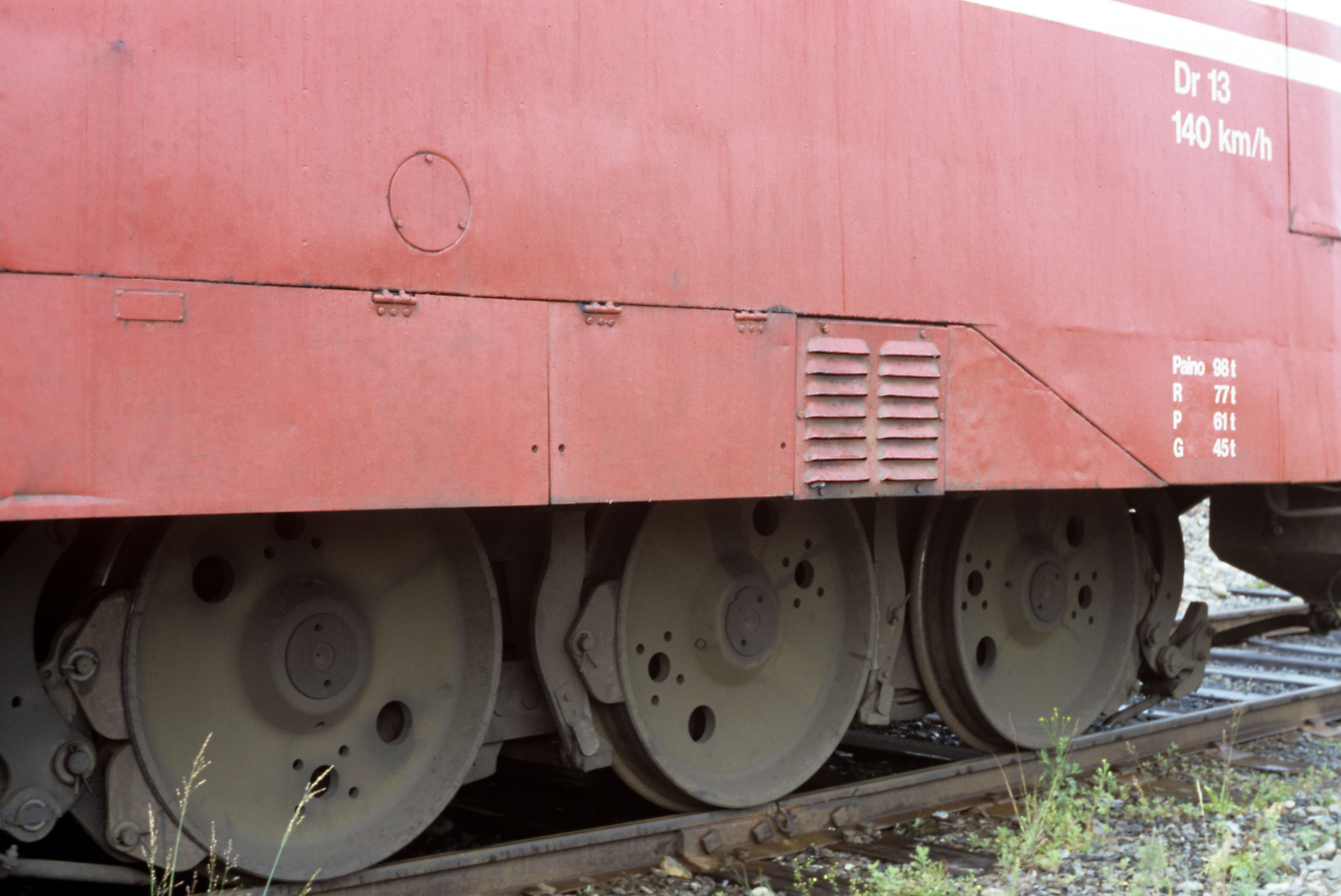
Detail. The final drive is outside the internally mounted wheel sets on one side. Here can be seen the non-driven side.

== See also ==
- Finnish Railway Museum
- VR Group
- List of Finnish locomotives
- List of railway museums Worldwide
- Heritage railways
- List of heritage railways
- Restored trains
- Jokioinen Museum Railway
- History of rail transport in Finland
