= VR Class Dr14 =

Class of Finnish diesel locomotives

Class Dr14
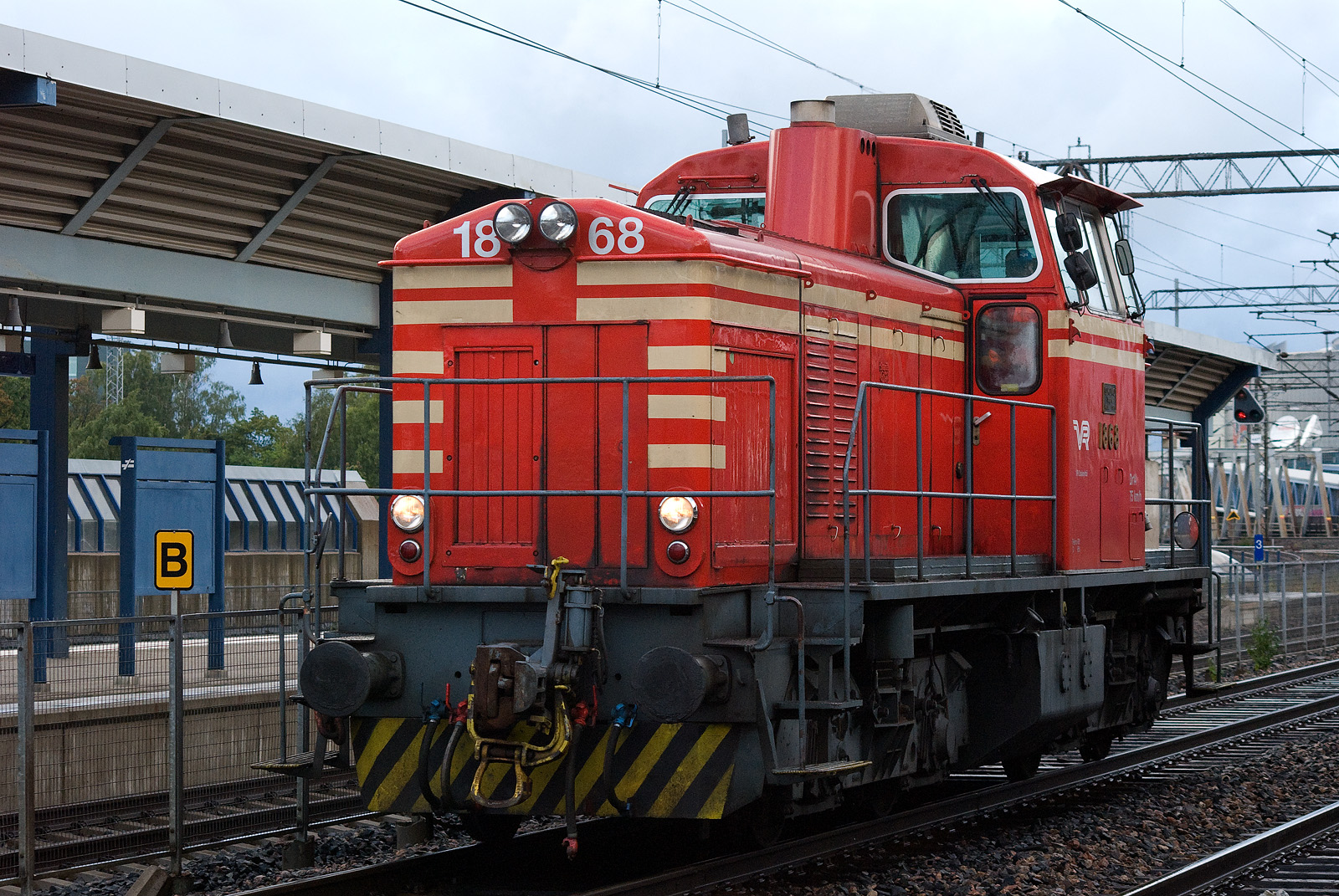
- A Dr14 at Pasila railway station.
Type and origin
- Power type: Diesel
- Builder: Rauma-Repola Oy, Lokomo, Finland
- Build date: 1968–1971
- Total produced: 24
Specifications
- Configuration
  - AAR: B-B
  - UIC: B′B′
- Gauge: 1,524 mm (5 ft)
- Wheel diameter: 1,050 mm (41 in)
- Wheelbase: 9,650 mm (380 in)
- Length: 14.00 m (45.93 ft)
- Width: 3.2 m (10 ft)
- Height: 4.7 m (15 ft)
- Adhesive weight: 19.5 t (19.2 long tons; 21.5 short tons); 21.5 t (21.2 long tons; 23.7 short tons) with added weight
- Loco weight: 78 t (77 long tons; 86 short tons); 86 t (85 long tons; 95 short tons) with added weight
- Fuel type: Diesel
- Prime mover: Tampella MAN R8V 22/30 ATL
- Transmission: Hydraulic Voith L206 rsb.
Performance figures
- Maximum speed: 75 km/h (47 mph) or 35 km/h (22 mph)
- Power output: 875 kW (1,173 hp)
Career
- Operators: VR
- Class: Dr14
- Number in class: 24
- Numbers: 1851–1874
- Nicknames: Seepra, Belarus, Raitakukko, Viirukukko, Riikinkukko, Dieselkukko
- Disposition: In Service

The Dr14 is a heavy shunting locomotive used by VR Group. Some of the locomotives can be radio controlled.

== History ==
VR ordered 24 locomotives to improve the efficiency of shunting work, which was back then mainly done with class Vr3 steam locomotives. Two locomotives were delivered for testing purposes in 1969, with the main series being delivered between 1970 and 1972. Until 1976, the Dr14 was known as the Vr12.

The locomotives are used at the biggest Finnish rail yards at Helsinki, Riihimäki, Tampere, Seinäjoki, Kouvola, Imatra and Pieksämäki.
