= VR Group =

State-owned railway company in Finland

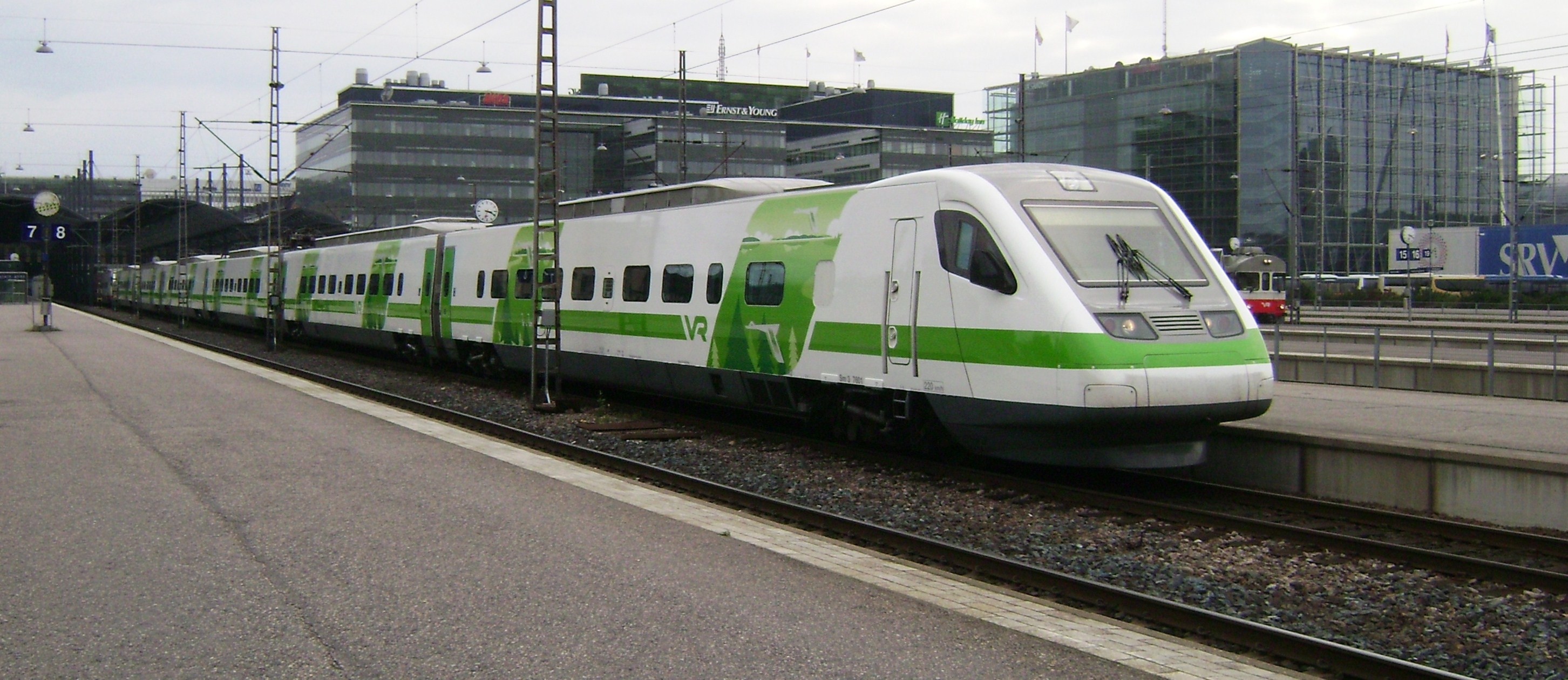
- Native name: VR-Yhtymä Oyj/VR-Group Abp
- Formerly: Suomen Valtion Rautatiet; Valtionrautatiet
- Type: public (julkinen osakeyhtiö)
- Industry: rail transport
- Predecessor: State Railways [fi]
- Founded: 1862; 164 years ago; 1995; 31 years ago (as a company)
- Headquarters: Helsinki, Finland
- Area served: Finland; Sweden
- Key people: Elisa Markula (CEO)
- Net income: €152 million
- Owner: Government of Finland
- Number of employees: 7,500 (2016)
- Subsidiaries: Avecra; Pohjolan Liikenne; VR FleetCare; VR Sverige
- Website: vr.fi

VR-Group Plc (Finnish: VR-Yhtymä Oyj, Swedish: VR-Group Abp), commonly known as VR, is a government-owned railway company in Finland. VR's most important function is the operation of Finland's passenger rail services with 250 long-distance and 800 commuter rail services every day. With 7,500 employees and net sales of €1,251 million in 2017, VR is one of the most significant operators in the Finnish public transport market area.

VR Group was created in 1995 after being known as Swedish: Finska Statsjärnvägarna, Finnish: Suomen Valtion Rautatiet (Finnish State Railways) from 1862 to 1922, and Valtionrautatiet ('State Railways', Swedish: Statsjärnvägarna) from 1922 to 1995.

The company includes subsidiaries Avecra for onboard catering service and Pohjolan Liikenne for bus traffic. Its headquarters is located at the Iso Paja building, previously occupied by the state-owned broadcasting company Yle, in north-central Helsinki.

== History ==
Rail transport started in Finland in 1862 between Helsinki and Hämeenlinna. Multiple main lines and smaller private railways were built in the following decades. VR mainly operated on the high-demand main lines. During the twentieth century, most private railway companies were shut down and VR assumed a monopoly in rail transport. In 1995 the company went through a process of corporatization to become the VR Group.

Since 2010, the maintenance and the construction of the railway network have been the responsibility of the Finnish Transport Infrastructure Agency (Finnish: Väylävirasto). The operation and network were originally carried out by the parent company Valtionrautatiet until 1995, when it was split into VR and the rail administration entity Ratahallintokeskus.

Norwegian company NRC Group bought VR Track (now NRC Group Finland) in 2018 for €225 million. In 2023, VR sold its road freight transport division to German investment firm Mutares.

== Services ==
Because in most parts of Finland the density of population is low, Finland is not optimally suited for railways. Commuter services are nowadays rare outside the Helsinki area, but express trains interconnect most cities. As in France, the majority of passenger services are connections to the capital, Helsinki. In the 2010s, VR has made connections faster by reducing stops at minor stations and increasing running speeds with new locomotives and renovated high-speed trains.

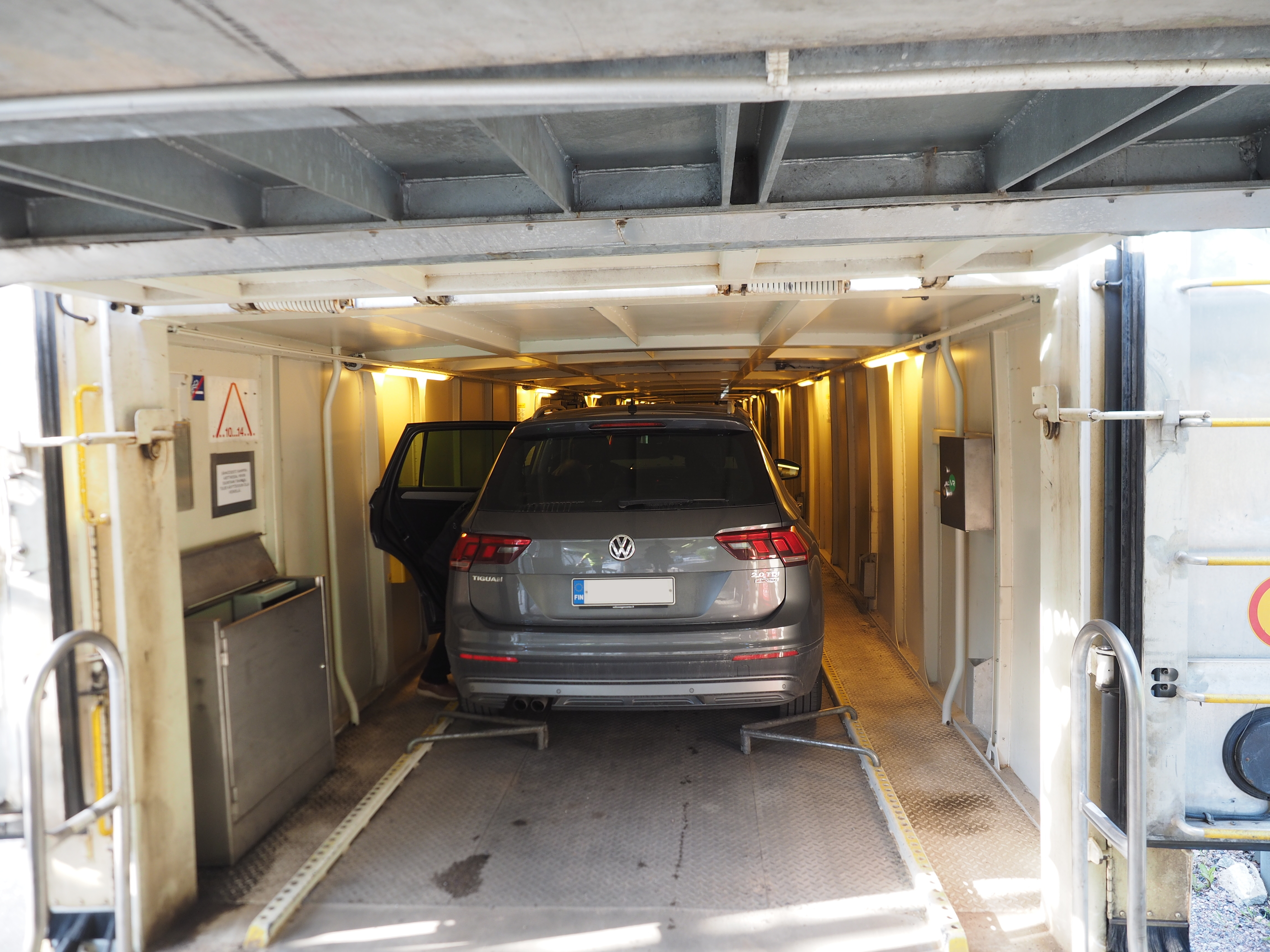
For motorail services, passengers drive their cars on board the car transport wagons themselves, and then leave the aforementioned wagon on foot to board a passenger wagon.

VR provides motorail services. Cars can be loaded onto and unloaded from trains at seven stations: Helsinki, Turku and Tampere in the south, Oulu further north, and Rovaniemi, Kemijärvi and Kolari in Lapland. Car transport trains stop at other stations along the way for normal passenger transport and is available as daily service to Rovaniemi and Kemijärvi and several times a week to Kolari. Finland is the only Nordic country to offer car transport on trains; however, car transport on trains is available in many European countries outside the Nordic countries. In August 2021 VR began operating the Tampere light rail.

=== Commuter rail ===
VR operates the commuter traffic in the Helsinki area on behalf of HSL and its own commuter rail services in southern Finland.

=== International services ===
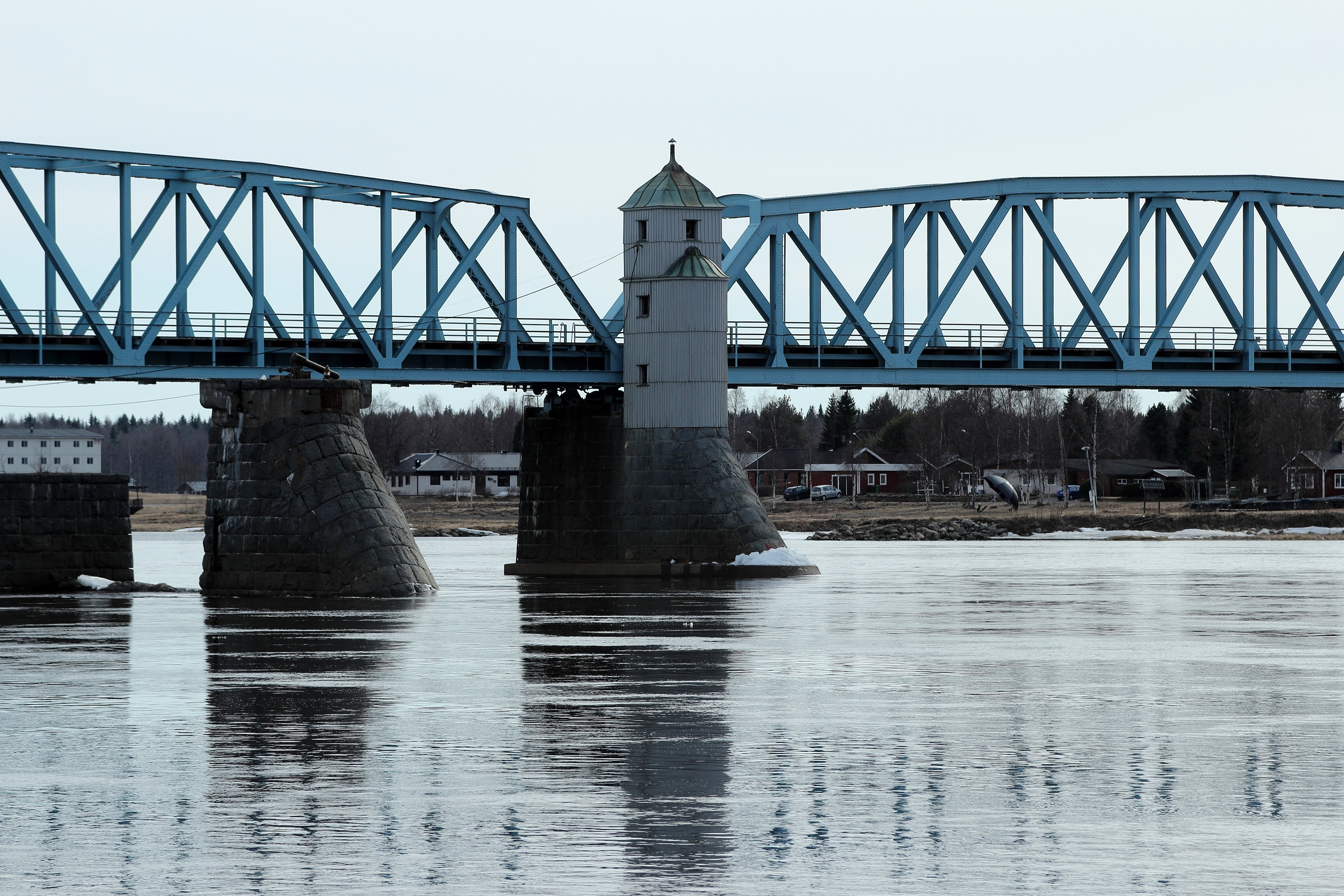
Railway bridge connecting the Finnish Tornio with Swedish Haparanda.

The railway line from Tornio in Finland to Haparanda in Sweden over the Torne River Railway Bridge was electrified by 2025 with the intention to re-establish crossborder services. A subsidy for the service was added to the Finnish government budget as an amendment during 2026, and as of June 2026, the service start is planned for August 2026. VR previously operated trains to Haparanda in 1988, and the Swedish State Railways withdrew its service from Luleå, Sweden to Tornio, Finland in 1992.

Before the Russian invasion of Ukraine, VR operated jointly with Russian Railways a passenger rail service named Allegro between Helsinki and Saint Petersburg. However due to sanctions imposed on Russia as a result of the Russian invasion of Ukraine, all passenger rail traffic between Finland and Russia has been suspended in March 2022, and the rolling stock has since been parked. These trains were in late 2023 taken over by VR, and have re-entered service as Pendolino Plus trains in November 2025, travelling between Helsinki and Turku (service began on the 3rd of November 2025) and Helsinki and Oulu (service began on the 15th of December 2025). The trains are aimed specifically at business travelers and commuters, and they are meeting the growing demand. There are currently four Pendolino Plus trains and they have begun service in November, partially replacing some IC and Pendolino trains on some routes.

=== Freight ===
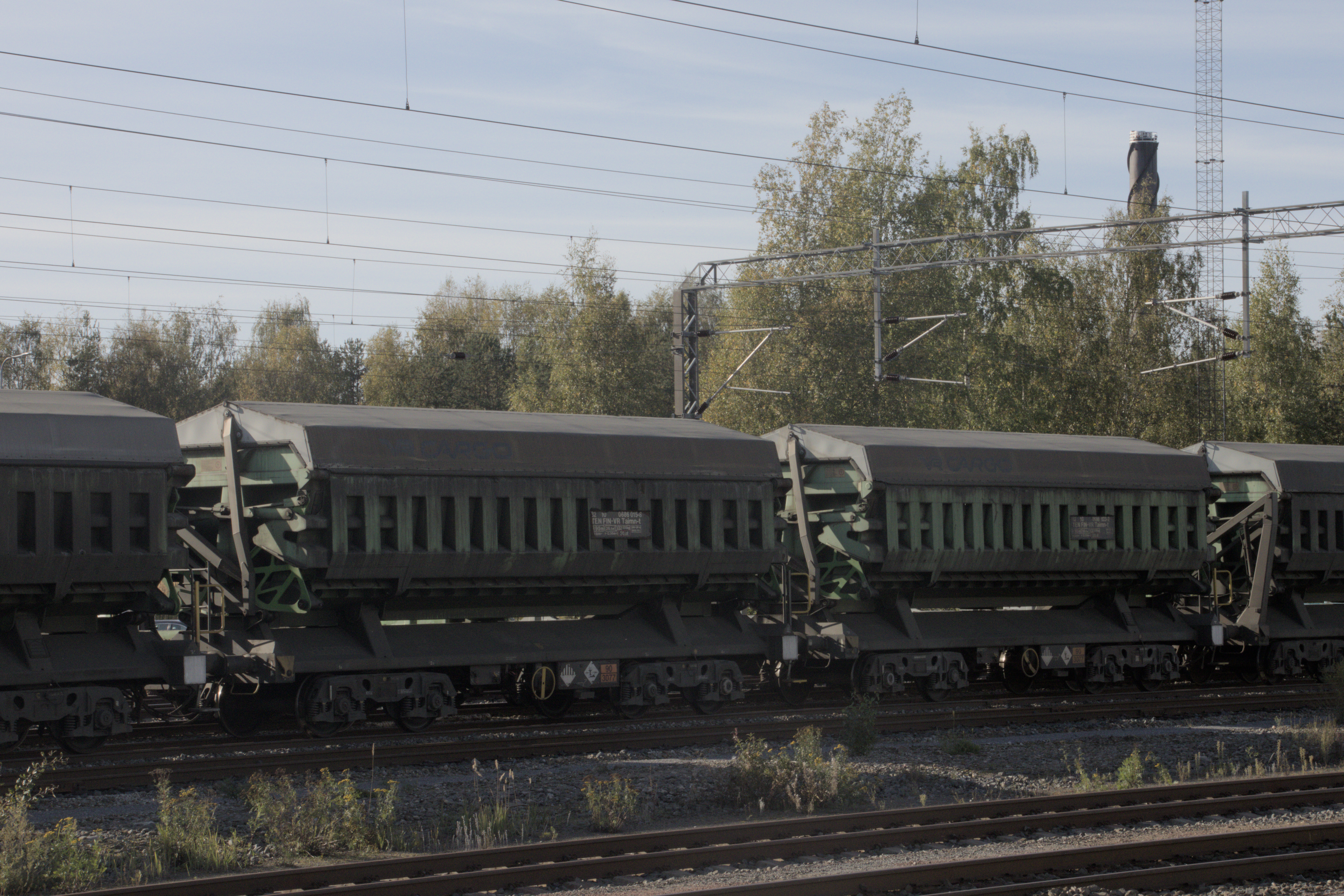
VR freight wagons

In 2025, VR had a market share of 87% of the rail freight in Finland.

VR terminated its international freight operations over the Russian border following the Russian invasion of Ukraine in 2022. Freight traffic to Sweden usually does not continue further than Tornio by rail due to differences in the track gauge between the two countries, although a possibility to exchange bogies exists. Train ferry connections from Turku to Stockholm, Sweden via VR's former subsidiary SeaRail were terminated at the end of 2011.

== Rolling stock ==
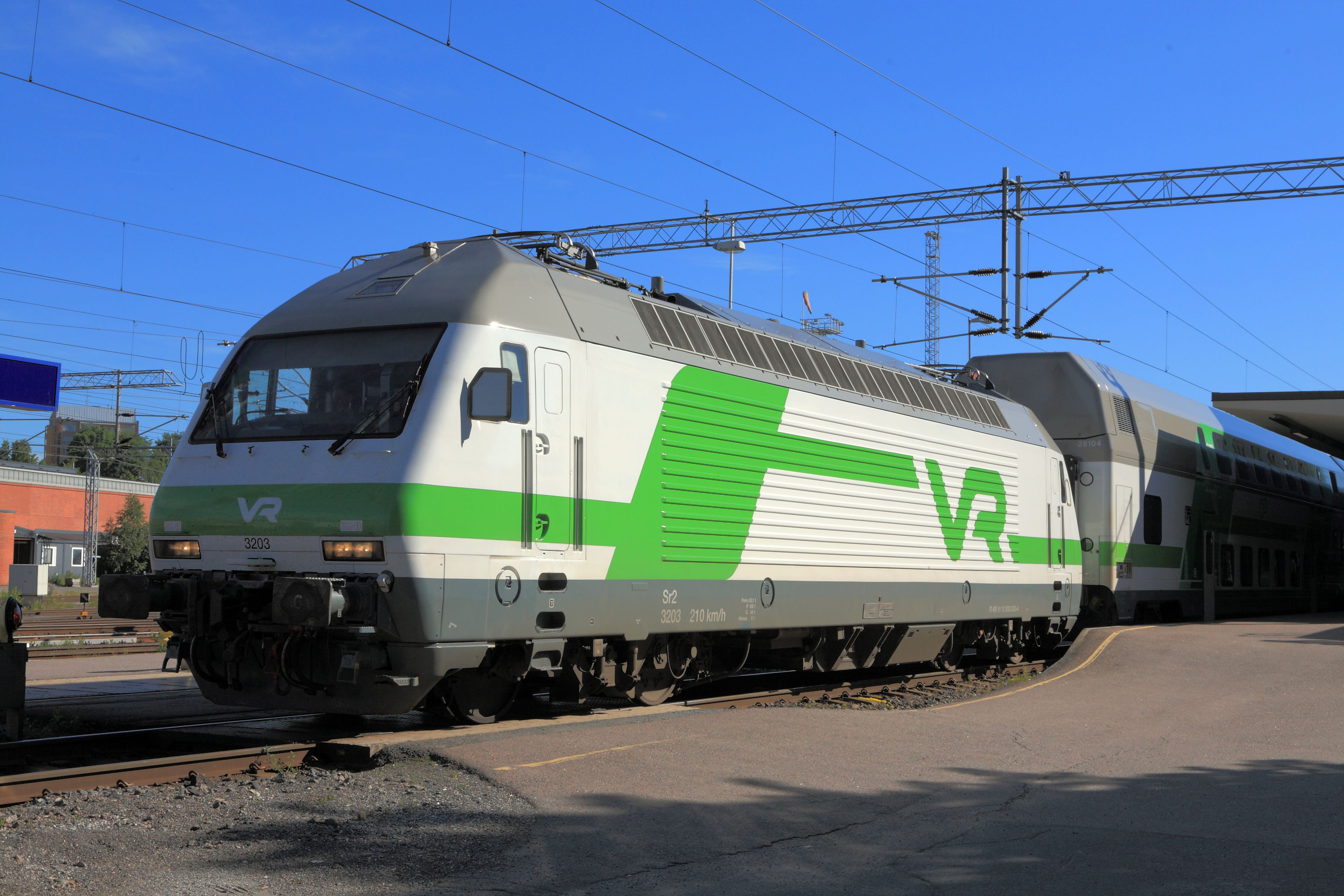
VR Class Sr2 electric locomotive at Turku Central Station.

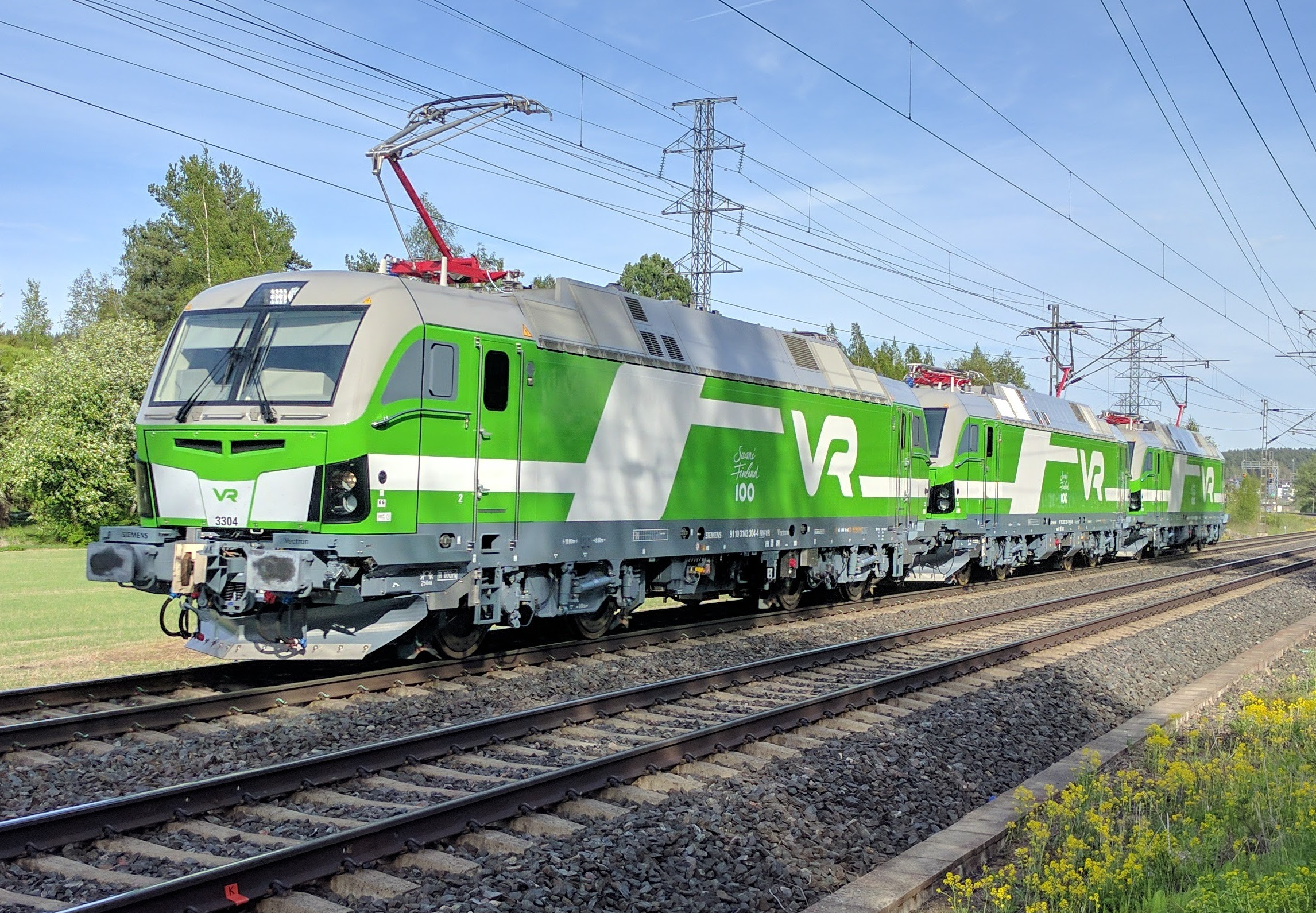
Three VR Class Sr3 locomotives between Hämeenlinna and Parola stations.

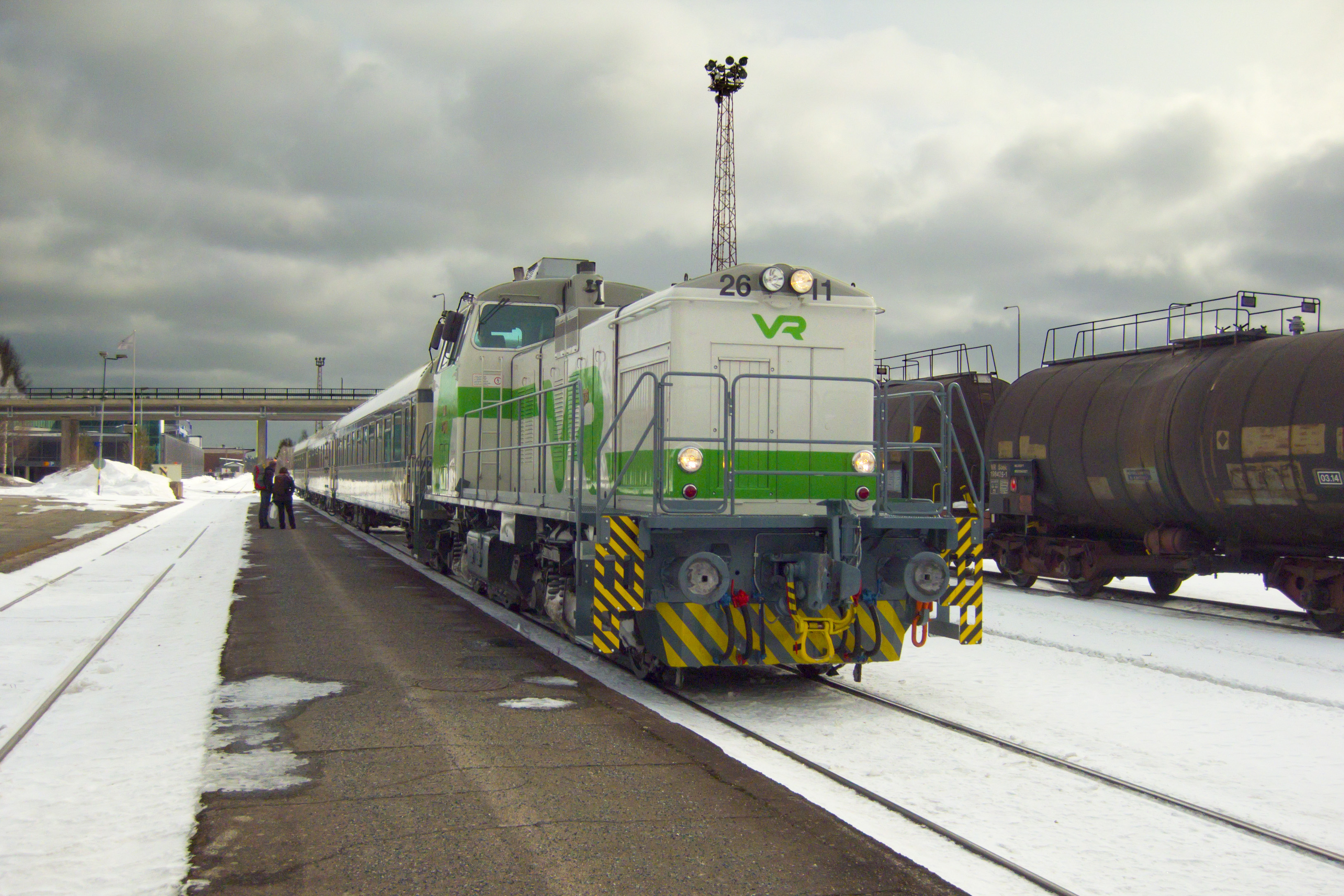
A refurbished and recoloured diesel locomotive pulls a regional train to Varkaus railway station in 2011.

=== Locomotives ===
As of 2025, the company operates three classes of electric locomotives (Sr1, Sr2 and Sr3) and four classes of diesel locomotives (Dv12, Dr14, Dr16 and Dr19). The use of diesel locomotive hauled passenger trains has declined due to electrification of all main lines and the (re)introduction of railbuses (Dm12) on secondary routes.

On 20 December 2013, VR announced plans to purchase 80 new electric locomotives, with 97 options. The upcoming Sr3 will be based on the Vectron and will replace the aging Sr1. The locomotives will be fitted with helper diesel engines that can be used for shunting in partly unelectrified railyards. Deliveries will occur between 2017 and 2026.

VR has purchased 60 Dr19 locomotives from Stadler Rail Valencia which will be delivered by the end of 2026. The Dr19 order will allow the company to retire its Dr16 locomotives by the end of 2025.

Locomotive types in use by the VR
Class	No. in use	Years of manufacture	Max. speed	Power type	Notes
Sr1	73	1973-1985, 1993 (1996)	140 km/h	Electric	Some originally had a maximum speed of 160 km/h
Sr2	36	1995–2003	210 km/h	Electric	
Sr3	80	2016–2026	200 km/h	Electric	
Dv12	84	1963–1984	125 km/h	Diesel-hydraulic	Pre-1976 classes: Sv12 and Sr12
Dr14	18	1968–1971	75 km/h	Diesel	
Dr19	40 (60 ordered)	2022–	120 km/h	Diesel-electric	

Notable locomotive types formerly used by VR
Class	Years in use	Wheel arrangement	Max. speed	Power type
Dr12 (Hr12)	1959–1990	Co-Co	120 km/h	Diesel
Dr13 (Hr13)	1962–2000	Co-Co	140 km/h	Diesel
Dr16	1986–2026	Co-Co	140 km/h	Diesel

=== Carriages ===
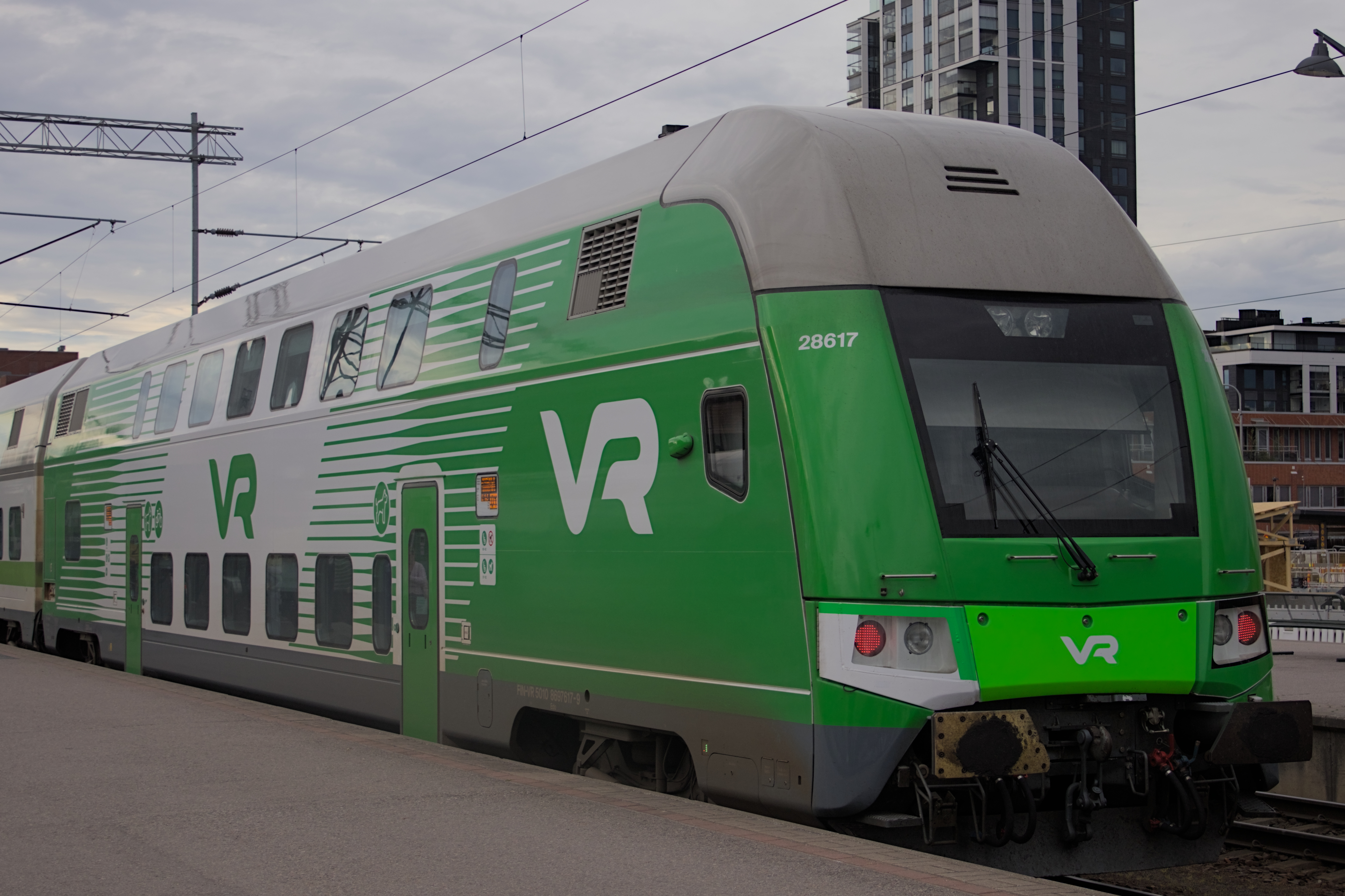
Class Edo control cars seen at Tampere Central Station.

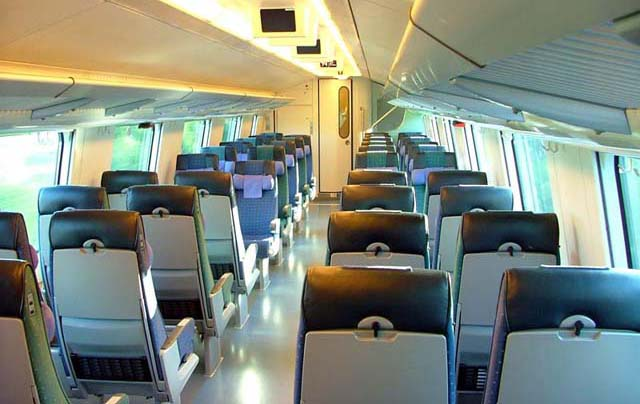
Interior view of the top deck of a VR InterCity double-deck carriage.

The wide Finnish loading gauge allows the passenger coaches to be considerably wider than most European passenger coaches. The aisle and seats are wider than in other European trains in the standard 2+2 configuration, and in commuter traffic 3+2 seat configuration is used to allow more seats for the same train length.

Double-deck InterCity carriages are the common coaches in the long-distance trains and the mainstay of VR's network. There are several variants, including coaches with first class service, family-friendly coaches and coaches with bike as baggage capability. The coaches are built in Finland by Transtech and have a top speed of 200 km/h.

"Blue" carriages, as they are popularly known as such due to their blue and light gray liveries, are used on night express trains from Helsinki to Kolari and Kemijärvi. Top speed is 140 or 160 km/h. On the "Blue" carriages, first class used to be distinguished by a yellow stripe above the windows and restaurant cars by a red stripe. Cars equipped with diesel generators, which are used to provide electricity to InterCity or sleeper wagons on non-electrified tracks, can be distinguished by a blue stripe above the windows.

==== Sleeper cars ====
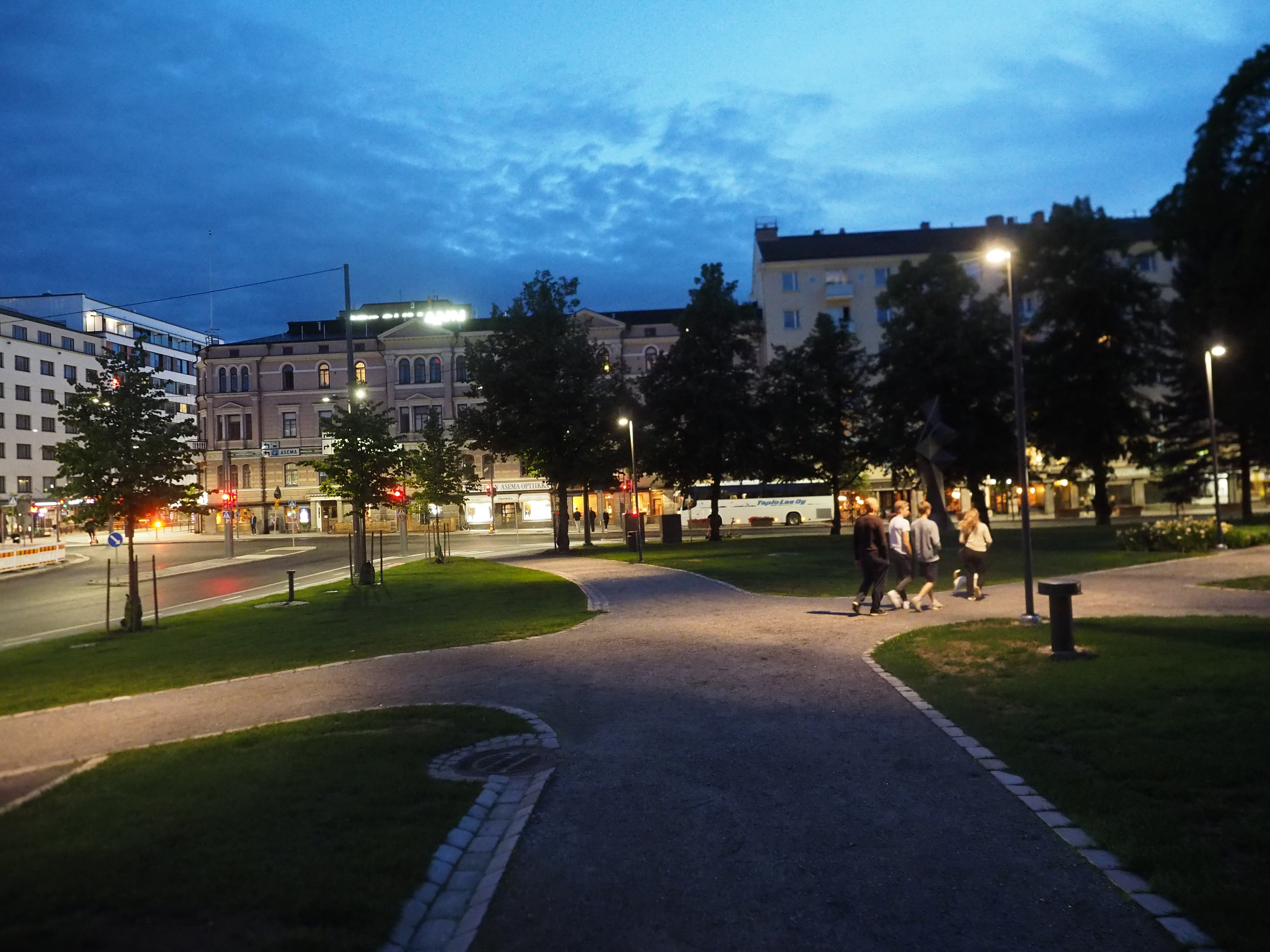
Sleeper trains between Helsinki and Lapland usually stop at Tampere for about half an hour around midnight, giving adventurous passengers time to briefly visit the city.

VR operates sleeper services between Helsinki/Turku and Lapland, which also include car-carrying (motorail) wagons. Double-deck sleeping carriages (including rooms with en suite showers and toilets) were introduced on the Helsinki–Rovaniemi service in the 2000s. These wagons are painted in a green-and-white livery similar to the InterCity coaches. Since 2016, the new coaches have begun to replace the blue carriages even on the way to Kolari.

Electrification extends from Oulu northwards to Kemijärvi. In 2006, direct sleeper services were discontinued beyond Rovaniemi (to Kemijärvi) because the new double-deck sleeping carriages were unable to operate with diesel haulage. The sleeper service to Kemijärvi was restarted in March 2008, by adding to the train in Rovaniemi a new diesel generator car supplying 1,500 V electricity for the sleeper cars between Rovaniemi and Kemijärvi; this setup was continued in use until the electrification extension to Kemijärvi was completed at the end of 2013. Sleeper services between Turku and Joensuu and Helsinki and Kajaani were withdrawn in 2006, but with the new direct line between Lahti and Kerava, the daytime services were made quicker.

On 12 January 2009, VR announced they had requested tenders for the purchase of 20 new sleeping cars, valued at €60–70 million. The two bidders interested were Alstom, which manufactures the Pendolino and some commuter trains for VR, and Finnish Transtech, which manufactured VR's new sleeping cars. The decision led to the resignation of the president and CEO of VR-Group, Henri Kuitunen, and the group's Chairman of the Board, Antti Lagerroos. Helsingin Sanomat reported they had wanted to defer the replacement of older sleeping car rolling stock until 2012 at the earliest. However, the decision went ahead because VR is a state owned business and there was pressure to seek orders from Finnish Transtech, which is currently struggling due to market downturns, in order to secure jobs.

=== Freight wagons ===
The Finnish loading gauge allows the operation of freight vehicles considerably larger than most other railways in the European Union. Road trailers (often of VR's subsidiary Transpoint) can be easily accommodated on ordinary flat wagons. Much of the freight on the VR network is carried from Russia in Russian wagons, including large capacity eight-axle oil tank wagons.

=== Multiple units ===
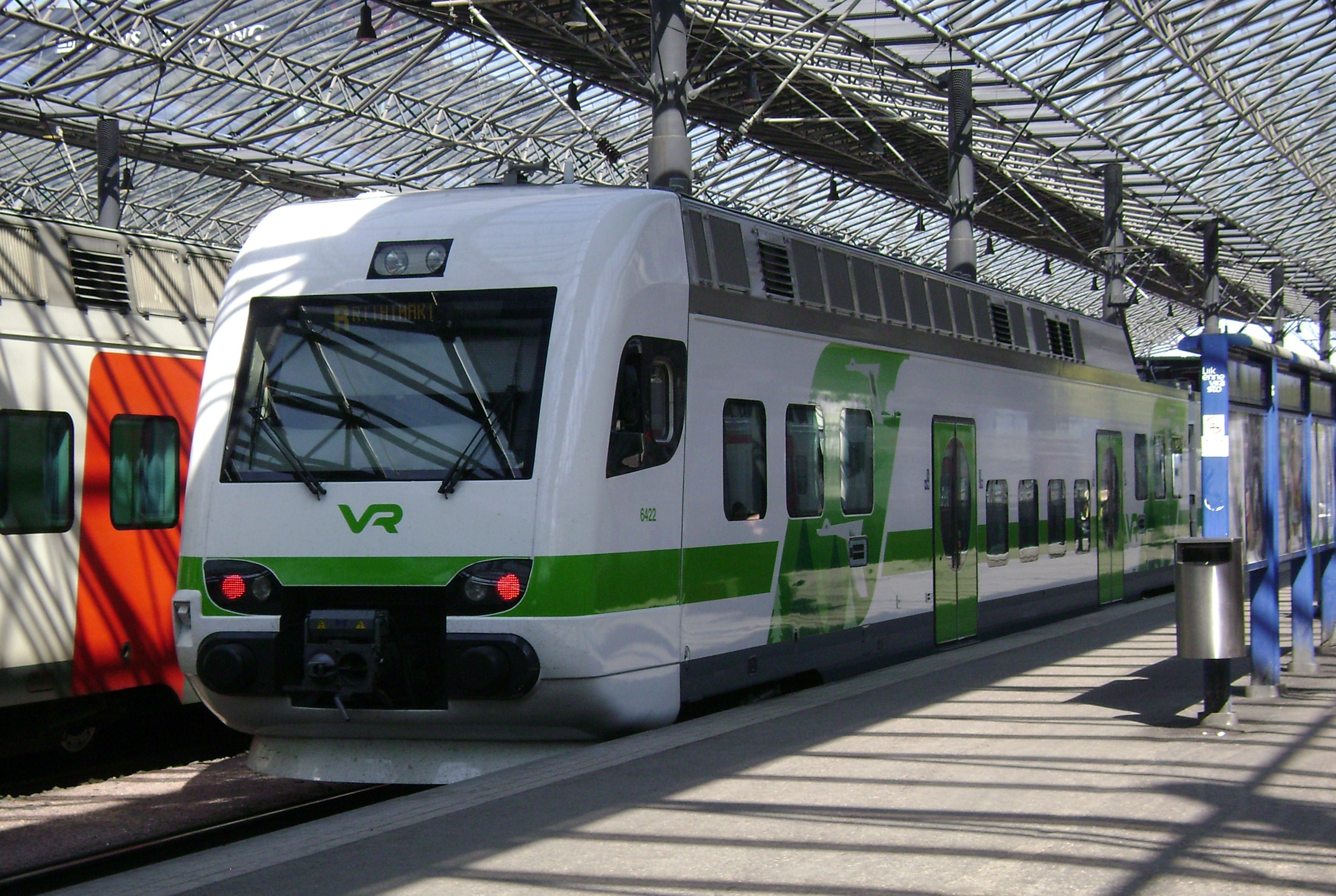
VR class Sm4 EMU at Helsinki railway station.

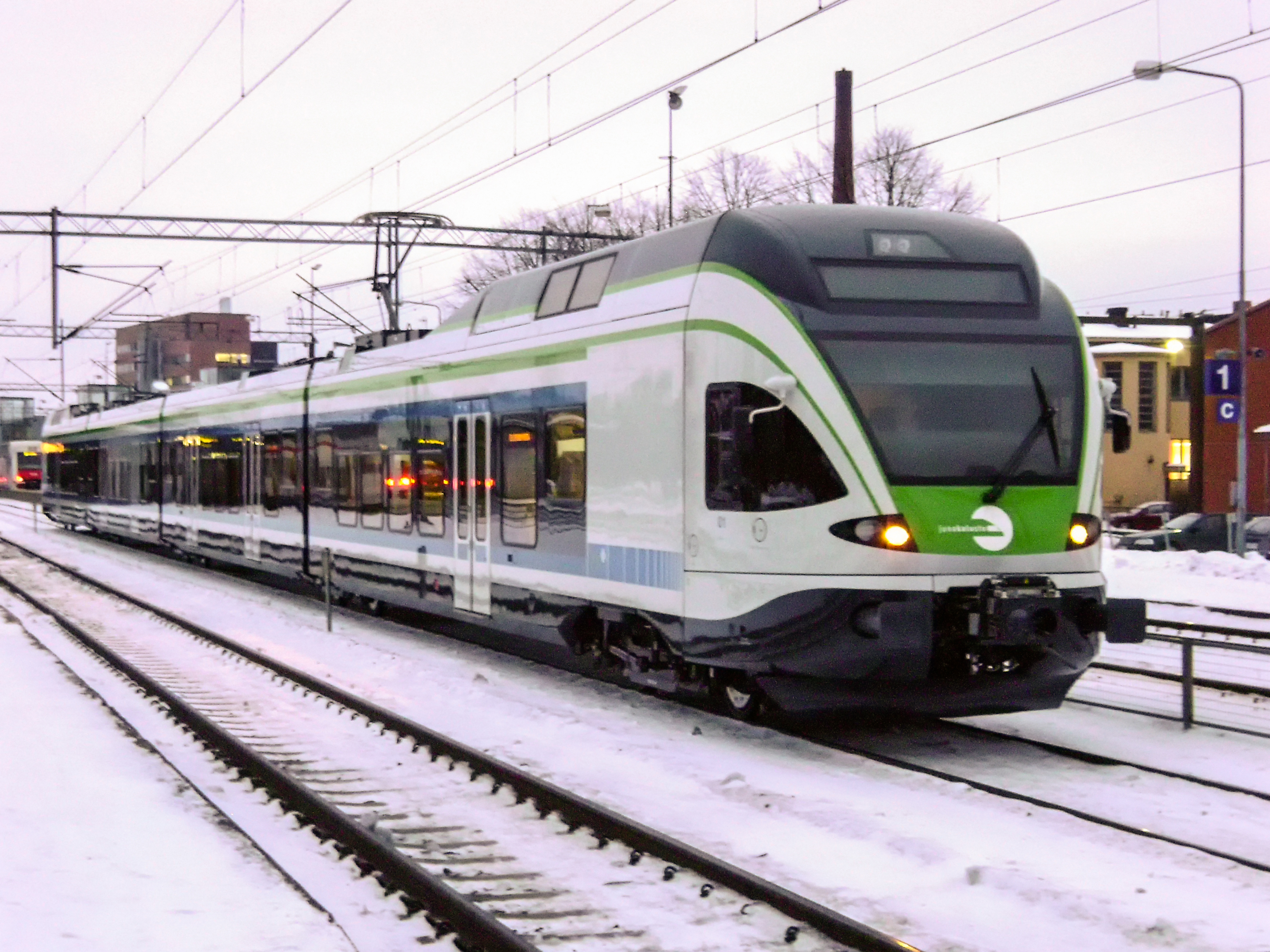
JKOY class Sm5 local train at Riihimäki.

The Sm3 class Pendolino is the VR's "flagship", mainly connecting largest cities to the capital with top running speed up to 220 km/h. Other EMUs in use are the Sm2 and Sm4 on commuter rail services. In addition, VR operates Pääkaupunkiseudun Junakalusto Oy -owned Sm5 class EMUs in Helsinki local traffic.

VR currently operates one class of diesel-powered multiple units: the Czech-built single carriage Dm12, which is used mainly on secondary lines.

Multiple units in use by VR
Class	No. in use	Years of manufacture	Max. speed	Notes
Sm2	33	1975-81	120 km/h	EMU consists of an Sm2 car and Eioc class car
Sm3	90 (15sets)	1992–2006	220 km/h	Tilting high-speed Pendolino train. Runs on domestic routes.
Sm4	60 (30 sets)	1998–2005	160 km/h	EMU consists of two Sm4 units
Sm5	81	2008-2017	160 km/h	EMU consists of one four-section Sm5 unit. Sm5 units are owned by Pääkaupunkiseudun Junakalusto Oy and are operated by VR on Helsinki Commuter Rail services.
Sm6	4	2010	220 km/h	Former Allegro train, a tilting high-speed Pendolino train. Re-introduced into long-distance service in 2025.
Dm12	14	2004–06	120 km/h	Single carriage diesel units

Future multiple units ordered by VR
Class	No. ordered	Year of introduction	Max. speed	Notes
Sm7	20 (+50 options)	2025-	160 km/h	EMU consists of one four-section Sm7 unit.

Former multiple units used by VR
Class	Total count	Years of manufacture	Withdrawn from service	Max. speed	Notes
Sm1	50	1968–73	2016	120 km/h	EMU consists of an Sm1 car and an Eio class car

== Subsidiaries ==
=== Avecra ===
Avecra is a VR subsidiary that operates the restaurant cars on long-distance routes. It was founded in 1977 as Liikenneravintolat Oy and got its current name in 1991. In 2017, VR Group bought Rail Gourmet Group's 40% stake in Avecra, becoming the sole owner of the company.

Avecra closed the eight restaurants it operated at Helsinki Central, Kerava, Tampere Central, and Tikkurila stations in 2024 and 2025, and continues to operate restaurant cars only.

=== Pohjolan Liikenne ===
Pohjolan Liikenne is a VR subsidiary that operates buses on tenders from local transit authorities. As of 2018, the company operated a fleet of 535 buses at 9 locations in Finland and employed about a thousand people.

=== VR FleetCare ===
In 2019, VR Group's maintenance division was moved to new subsidiary, VR FleetCare. VR FleetCare has since started manufacturing its own freight wagons, which have been sold to the Swedish Armed Forces, the Norwegian Defence Materiel Agency and Metsä Group. It has also developed transfer bogies to enable transporting 1,435 mm (4 ft 8 1/2 in) standard gauge rolling stock on the Finnish 1,524 mm (5 ft) railway network, which were used to transport SJ X40 multiple units to FleetCare's Oulu workshops for refurbishment.

In 2024, VR FleetCare sold its track maintenance vehicle rental and service business to Finnish company Teräspyörä.

=== VR Sverige ===
In July 2022, VR Group established operations in Sweden by acquiring Arriva Sverige AB from the German state-owned company Deutsche Bahn. As part of this acquisition, which was finalised on 1st July 2022, VR Group gained control over extensive local and regional public transportation operations, including bus, tram and train services in Stockholm, Östergötland, and Skåne, including Skånetrafiken's Pågatåg. This acquisition brought approximately 2,300 employees into the VR Group. The acquired operations include 740 buses, 180 trains, and 70 trams, facilitating around 58 million bus journeys and 54 million train journeys annually.

Following the acquisition, Arriva Sverige was rebranded as VR Sverige and operates under the VR Group brand. Since 2022, VR has grown in Sweden with contracts that include train services in regions like Bergslagen and Gävleborg. VR Sverige also secured a 10-year contract to operate bus services for SL in Tyresö, Stockholm, beginning in July 2025. This contract is valued at approximately €215 million and involves around 190 employees.

In addition to the purchase of Arriva Sweden, VR Group has also strengthened its presence in the Swedish rail market through the acquisition of MTRX, a high-speed train operator on the Stockholm-Gothenburg route. Acquired in 2024, MTRX was rebranded as VR Snabbtåg Sverige and became part of VR Group’s long-distance operations. The MTRX acquisition included six Stadler Flirt X74 EMUs, which operate over 120 weekly services on the route.

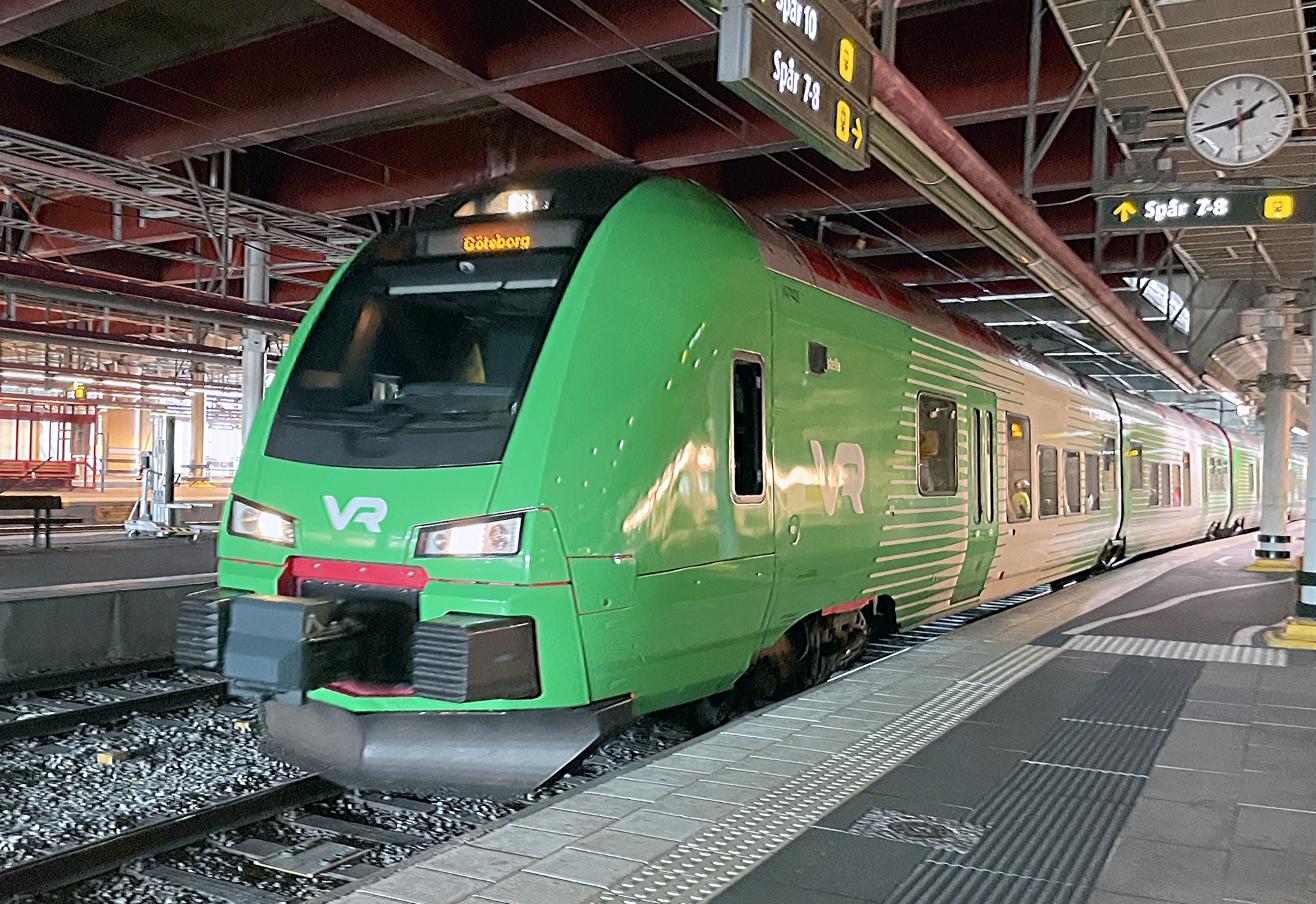
A VR X74 train at Stockholm Central Station

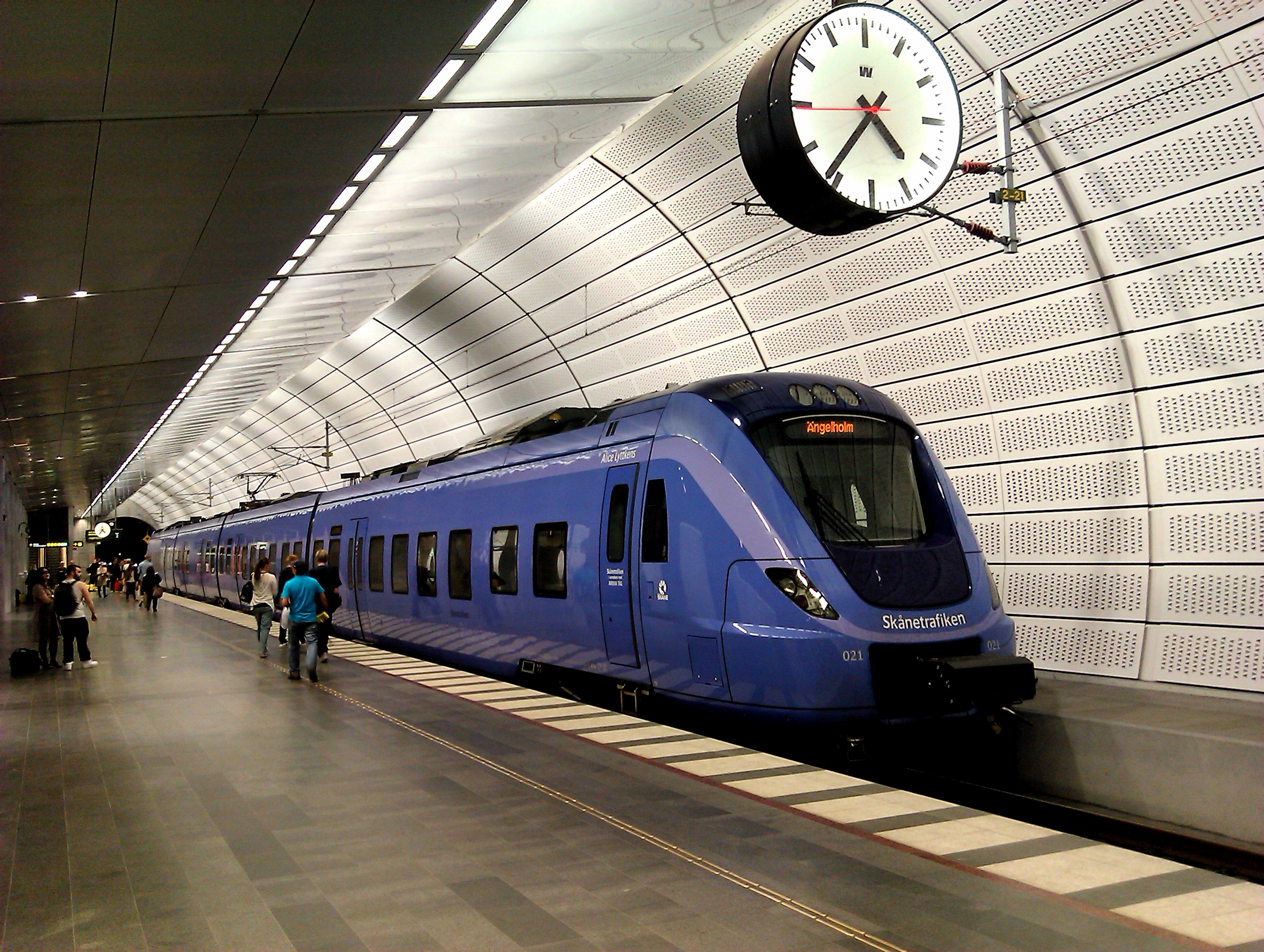
A Pågatåg train Malmö operated by VR Sverige

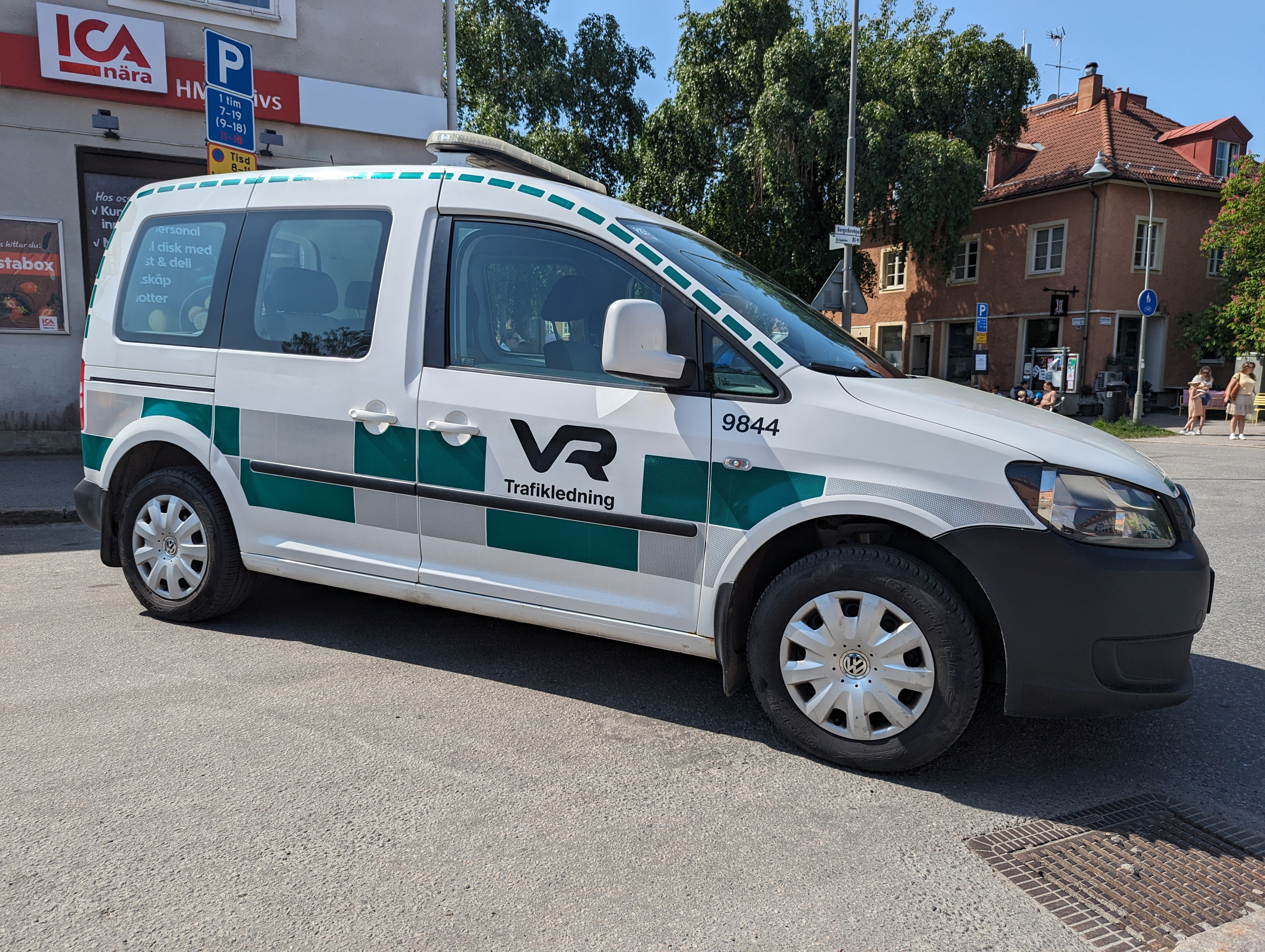
VR Support vehicle for the Tvärbanan

== Livery ==
VR has used several liveries in the past. When InterCity traffic started during the 1980s, VR's colour scheme was changed from blue to red and white. In 2009, VR changed its corporate colour to green and all the coaches have been repainted in green and white except the Cemt and Eifet carriages. A new darker shade of green was introduced in 2024.

== See also ==
- ExpressBus
- Rail transport in Finland
- Finnish Railway Museum
- List of Finnish locomotives
