= VR Class Dr19 =

Class of Finnish diesel locomotives

Class Dr19
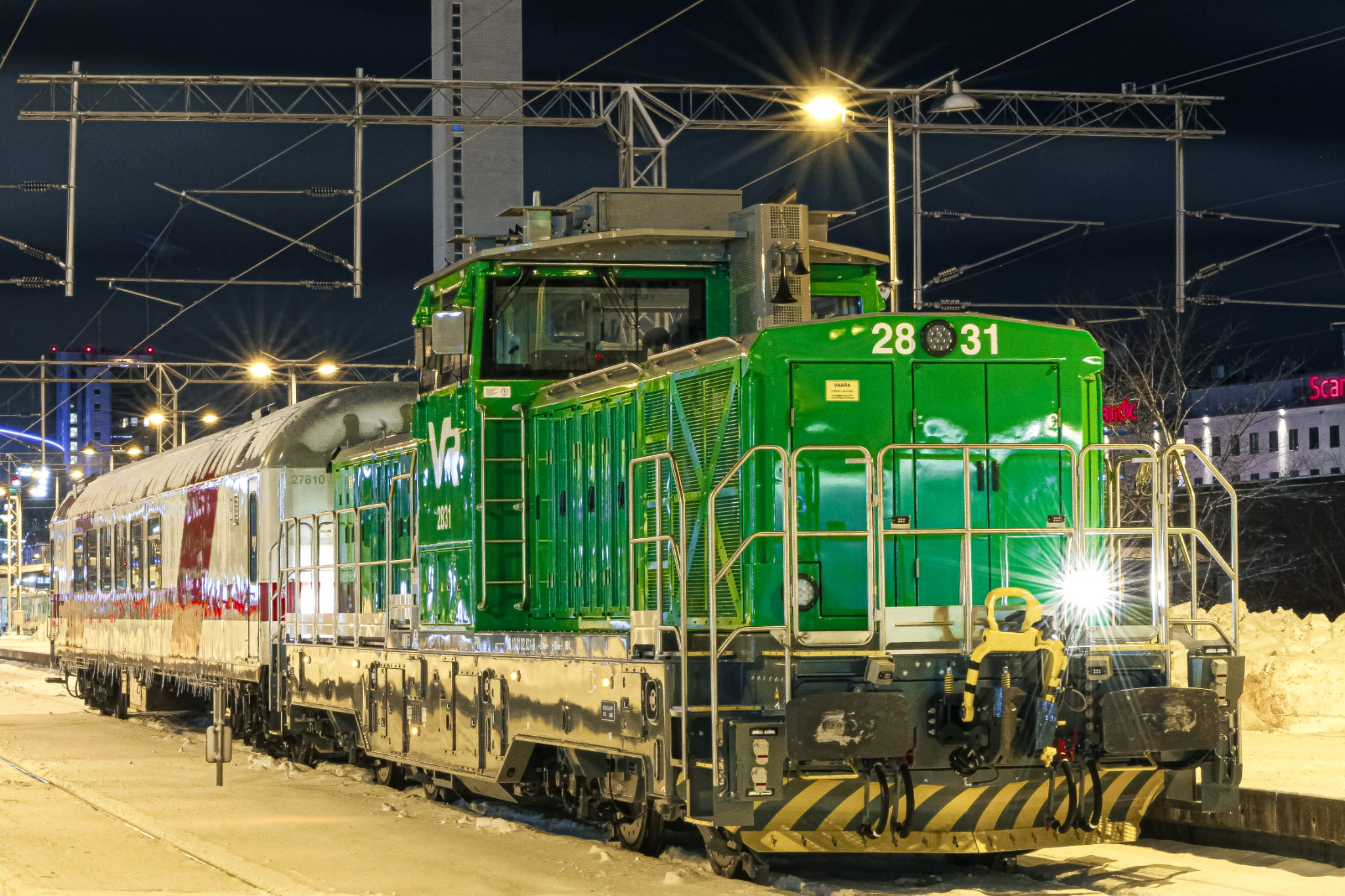
Type and origin
- Power type: Diesel-electric
- Builder: Stadler Rail Valencia
- Total produced: 60
Specifications
- Configuration
  - UIC: Bo′Bo′
- Gauge: 1,524 mm (5 ft)
- Length: 18 metres (59 ft)
- Height: 4.9 metres (16 ft)
- Axle load: 22 tonnes (22 long tons; 24 short tons)
- Loco weight: 88 tonnes (87 long tons; 97 short tons)
- Prime mover: 2x Caterpillar C32
Performance figures
- Maximum speed: 120 km/h (75 mph)
Career
- Operators: VR Group
- Number in class: 60
- Delivered: 2022–2026

The Dr19 is a class of diesel-electric locomotives primarily used in freight traffic by VR Group. VR has ordered 60 locomotives from Stadler Rail Valencia that are due to be delivered by the end of 2026, and has options for 100 more.

The first Dr19 locomotive arrived in Finland for testing in 2022, and entered commercial service in May 2023.
