= Ylitornio railway station =

Railway station in Ylitornio, Finland

Ylitornio Övertorneå
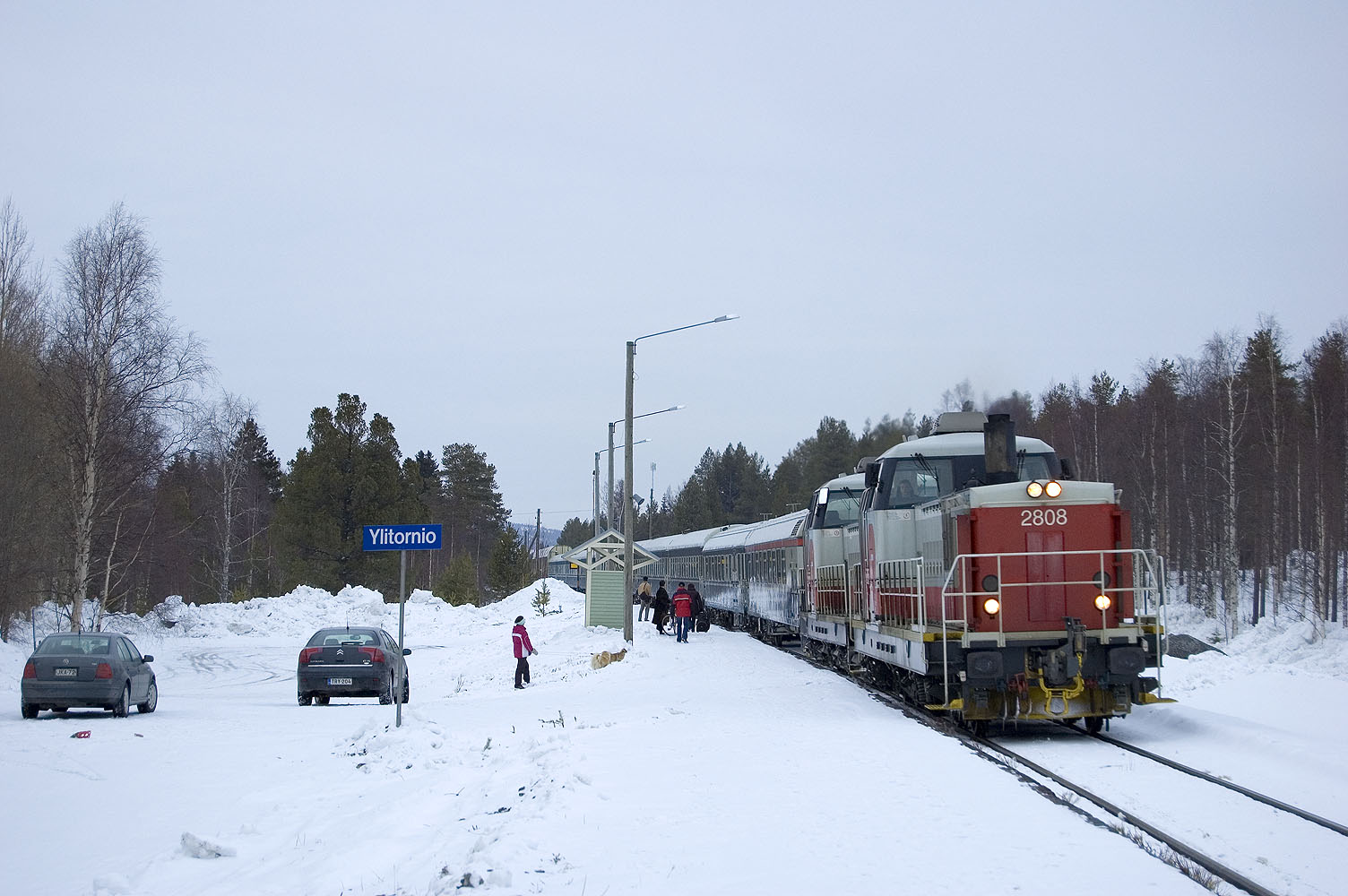

General information
- Coordinates: 66.324584°N 23.682307°E
- Owner: Finnish Transport Infrastructure Agency
- Line: Kolari railway

Construction
- Structure type: passenger platform

History
- Opened: 1927

Services
Preceding station	VR Group	Following station
Tornio-Itäinen towards Helsinki	Helsinki–Kolari (overnight service)	Pello towards Kolari
Location

Ylitornio railway station (Swedish: Övertorneå järnvägsstation) is located in the municipality of Ylitornio in the Lapland Province of Finland. It is located about 62 kilometres (39 mi) north from Tornio railway station. The station only serves passenger traffic; most trains are hauled by VR Class Dr16 locomotives. Ylitornio railway station was opened in 1927.
