= HKL Class M100 =

Class of metro train used on the Helsinki Metro

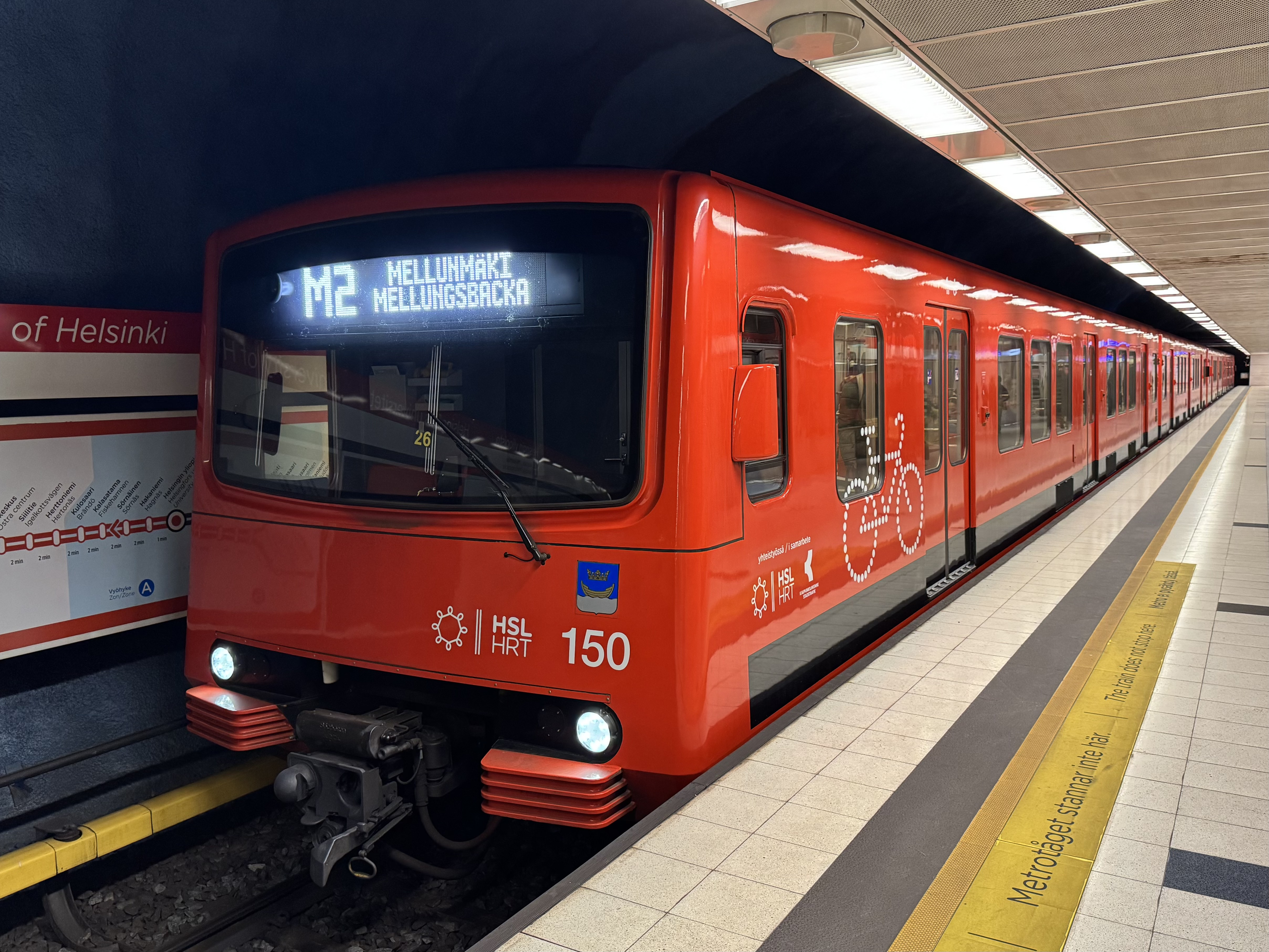
- A refurbished M100 train, February 2026

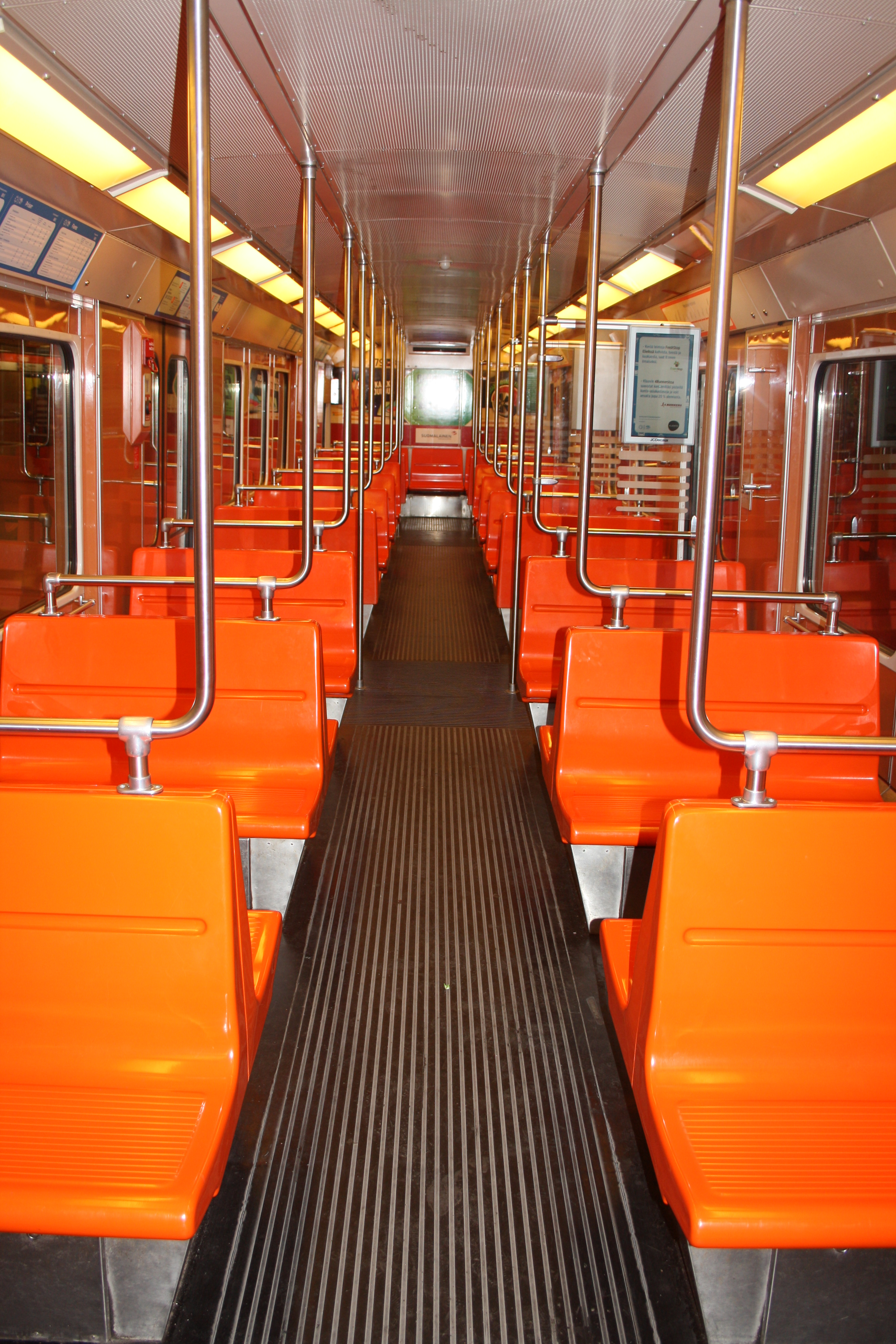
- Interior of a M100 carriage
- Manufacturers: Valmet, Strömberg
- Assembly: Tampere, Finland
- Constructed: 1977–1984
- Entered service: 1982
- Refurbished: Talgo Oy Otanmäki; 2004–2009; VR FleetCare; 2019–2023
- Scrapped: 2021 (prototype "Nokkajuna" units)
- Number built: 42 units
- Number in service: 39 units
- Number preserved: 1 car
- Number scrapped: 5 cars
- Predecessor: "Nokkajuna" (1977 prototype)
- Successor: M200; M300; M400
- Formation: 2 cars
- Fleet numbers: 101–184
- Capacity: 118 seats, 130 seats (before second refurbishment)
- Operator: Helsinki City Transport
- Depots: Roihupelto, Sammalvuori
- Line served: Helsinki Metro: M1, M2

Specifications
- Train length: 44.2 m (145 ft 3/16 in)
- Car length: 22.1 m (72 ft 6 1/16 in)
- Width: 3.2 m (10 ft 6 in)
- Height: 3.6 m (11 ft 9 3/4 in)
- Doors: 3 double doors per car
- Wheel diameter: 840 mm (33 in)
- Wheelbase: 2,200 mm (7 ft 2 5/8 in)
- Maximum speed: 100 km/h (62 mph) (design); 80 km/h (50 mph) (service)
- Traction system: Strömberg SAMI SCR–VVVF
- Traction motors: 8 × Strömberg HXUR/E 505G2 125 kW (168 hp) asynchronous 3-phase AC
- Power output: 1 MW (1,300 hp)
- Electric systems: 750 V DC third rail
- Current collection: Contact shoe
- UIC classification: Bo′Bo′+Bo′Bo′
- Multiple working: Mechanically with all Helsinki Metro rolling stock
- Track gauge: 1,522 mm (4 ft 11 29/32 in)

The HKL Class M100 is the first and oldest class of metro trains in use on the Helsinki Metro. One train consists of two individually numbered cars. A total of 42 units (84 cars in total) were manufactured between 1977 and 1984.

Up to six pairs can be combined into a 12-car train formation, however due to the relatively short length of the platforms especially on the Länsimetro extension, at most two pairs can be coupled for passenger service giving a 4-car formation per train. Before 2016, three pairs resulting in 6-car formations were used except for summertime and late evening services. Longer combinations are used in maintenance operations. Any Helsinki metro train types can be combined mechanically, such as for towing. The M100 series is the first train in the world to use VVVF propulsion inverters, developed and manufactured by Strömberg.

The first three units (cars 101–106; nicknamed "nokkajuna", "beak trains") were constructed as prototypes in 1977 and had some minor technical differences compared to the later units. The prototype units were retired from service in 2021 and five of them were subsequently scrapped in Vantaa, with one unit preserved at the Helsinki City Museum.

The M100s were refurbished twice: first in 2004–2009, at the Talgo Oy (now Škoda Transtech) rolling stock works at Otanmäki and secondly in 2019-2022 by VR FleetCare at its Ilmala depot, to extend their lifetime until their planned retirement in 2030, by which time the class will be almost 50 years old.

== Accidents and incidents ==
- On 27 July 2016, M100 carriage no. 157 was involved in an accident with M300 unit no. 302 when the latter derailed near Itäkeskus metro station during testing.

== See also ==
- Helsinki Metro
- Helsinki City Transport
- HKL Class M200
- HKL Class M300
- HKL Class M400
