= Pello railway station =

Railway station in Pello, Finland

Pello
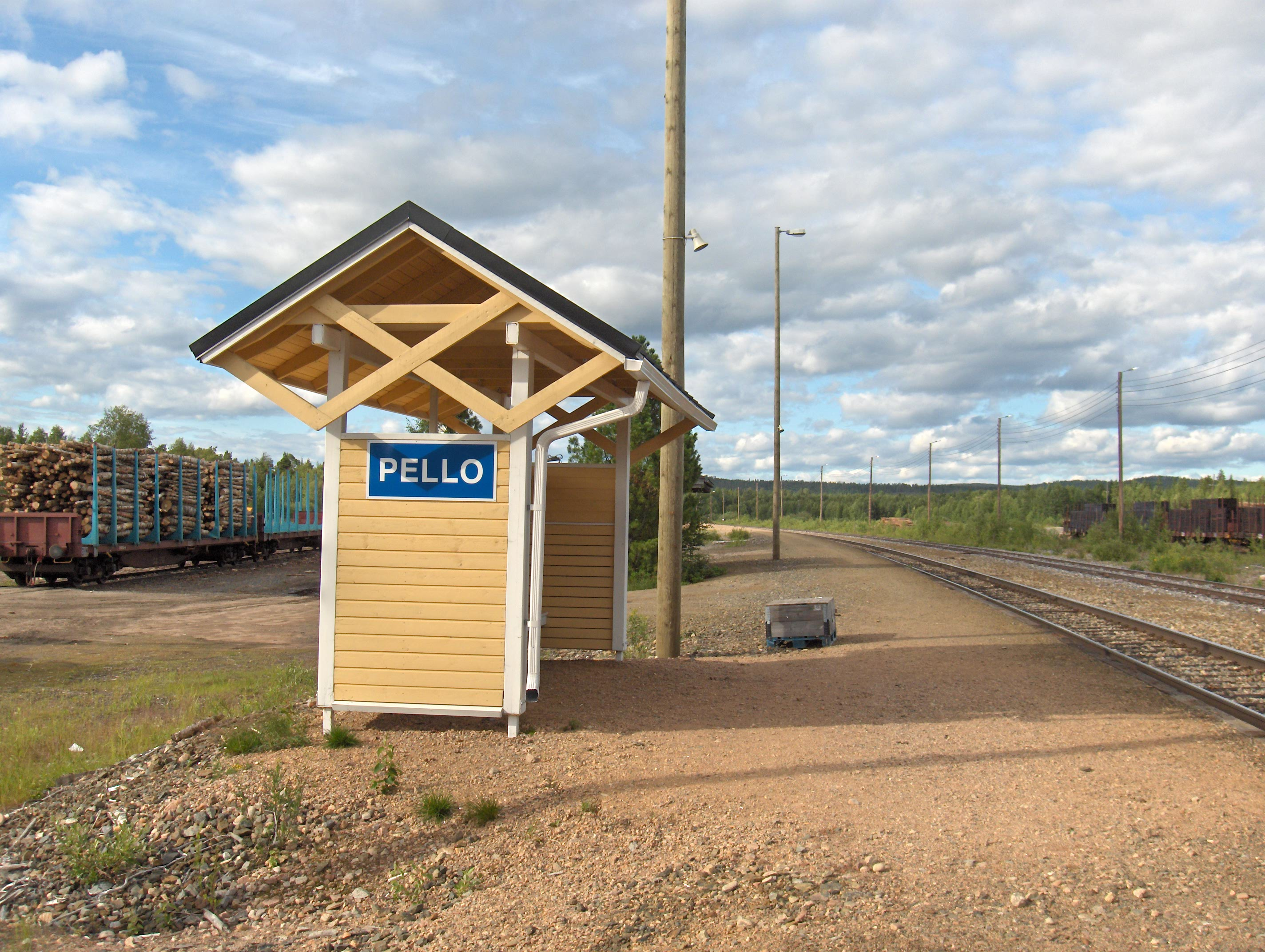
- Pello railway station, July 2007 (with the passenger platform on the right and sidings for freight wagons on the left)

General information
- Coordinates: 66.785007°N 23.992521°E
- Owner: Finnish Transport Infrastructure Agency
- Line: Kolari railway

Construction
- Structure type: passenger platform

History
- Opened: 1964

Passengers
- 2008: 3,000

Services
Preceding station	VR Group	Following station
Ylitornio towards Helsinki	Helsinki–Kolari (overnight service)	Kolari Terminus
Location

Pello railway station is located in the municipality of Pello in the Lapland Province of Finland. The station is located about 121 kilometres north from the Tornio railway station, and about 62 kilometres south from the Kolari railway station. Most trains at Pello are hauled by VR Class Dr16 diesel locomotives.

The station is not to be confused with the Pelto halt, a former halt located on the track between Helsinki and Turku.

== Building structure ==
The station is basic, with one solitary unpaved platform, though there is a small wooden bench with a roof. The platform of the station is 26.5 centimeters above the ground, and has a total length of 454 meters. The station has four track, with one platform track, one side track, and two loading tracks.

== Operation ==
The track from Kaulinranta railway station to Pello was built in 1964, and in the next year, the track was extended from Pello to Sieppijärvi railway station.

The station serves both passenger and freight traffic. It's mainly used for the loading of logs onto freight carriages, although there are daily passenger services to Kolari railway station and Helsinki Central railway station.

The station is the only point on the track between Tornio and Kolari to allow trains to pass each other. The traffic control is handled remotely from the Oulu railway station.
