= Konttajärvi =

Lake in Pello, Finland

- Location within Finland
- Location: Pello
- Coordinates: 66°50′00″N 24°24′00″E
- Basin countries: Finland
- Surface area: 2.35 km^{2} (0.91 sq mi)
- Average depth: 5.29 m (17.4 ft)
- Shore length^{1}: 11.91 km (7.40 mi)
- Surface elevation: 119.5 m (392 ft)
- ^{1} Shore length is not a well-defined measure.

Konttajärvi is a lake in Finland. This city is located in the municipality of Pello in the province of Lapland, in the northern part of the country, 700 km north of the capital Helsinki. Konttajärvi is 119.5 meters above sea level. Its depth is 5.29 meters. The area is 2.35 square kilometers and the length of its coastline is 11.91 kilometers. This lake is part of Torne's main basin. Mostly low-growing, low-growing subarctic forests grow around Konttajärvi.
