= HKL Class M200 =

Class of Helsinki Metro trains

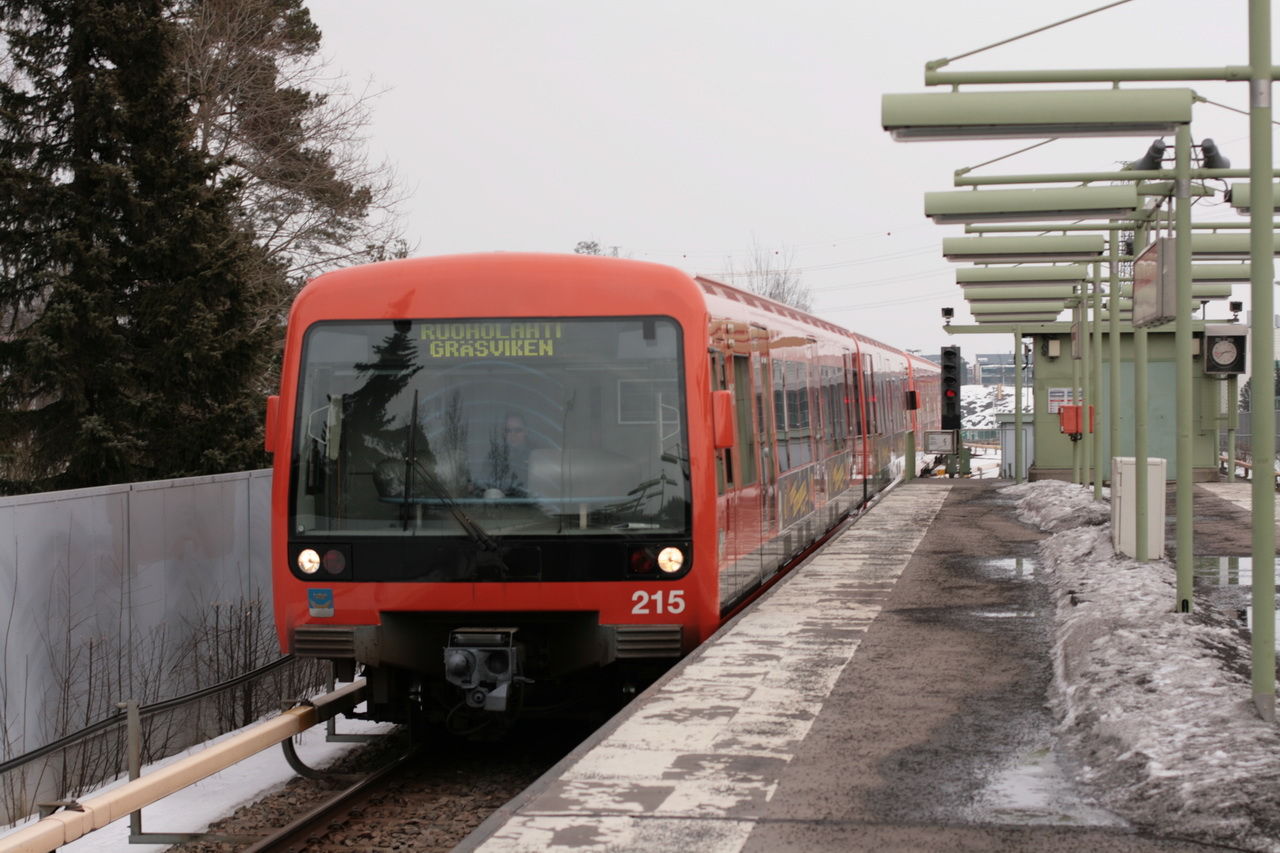
- A M200 train at Kulosaari metro station (March 2009)

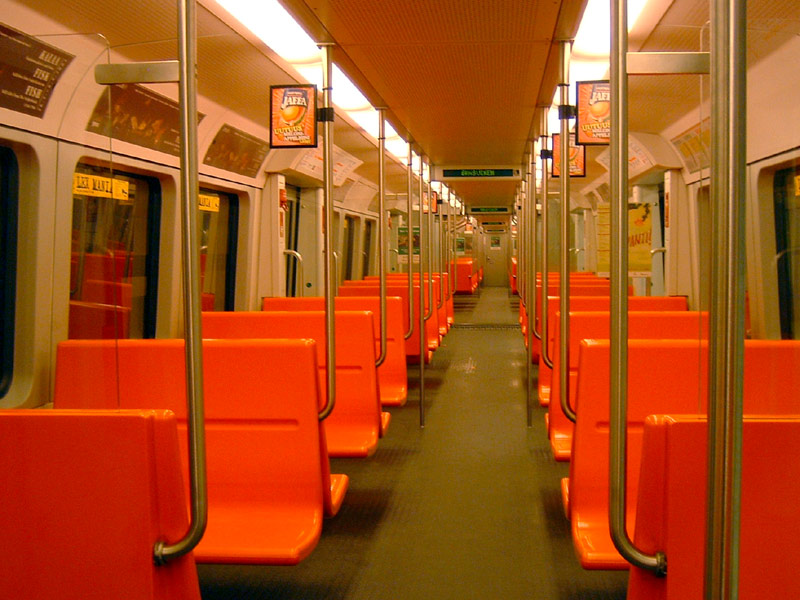
- Interior of a M200 carriage
- Stock type: Electric multiple unit
- Manufacturer: Bombardier-DWA, Alstom
- Assembly: Germany
- Constructed: 2000–2001
- Entered service: 2001
- Refurbished: VR FleetCare; 2023–2024
- Number built: 12 units
- Number in service: 12 units
- Formation: 2 cars
- Fleet numbers: 201-224 (each car is numbered individually)
- Capacity: 116 seats
- Operators: Helsinki City Transport
- Depots: Roihupelto, Sammalvuori
- Lines served: Helsinki Metro: M1, M2

Specifications
- Train length: 44.3 m (145 ft 4 1/8 in)
- Car length: 22.15 m (72 ft 8 1/16 in)
- Width: 3.2 m (10 ft 6 in)
- Height: 3.7 m (12 ft 1 11/16 in)
- Floor height: 1.1 m (3 ft 7 5/16 in)
- Doors: 3 double doors per car
- Wheel diameter: 850–760 mm (33–30 in) (new–worn)
- Wheelbase: 2,200 mm (7 ft 2 5/8 in)
- Maximum speed: 90 km/h (56 mph) (design); 80 km/h (50 mph) (service)
- Weight: 61 t (60 long tons; 67 short tons)
- Axle load: 13 t (13 long tons; 14 short tons)
- Traction system: Alstom Traxis (former a part of Holec) IGBT-VVVF inverter
- Traction motors: 8× Brush MDMKT 39/32.5 (115 kW (154 hp))
- Power output: 920 kW (1,230 hp)
- Acceleration: 1.2 m/s^{2} (3.9 ft/s^{2})
- Deceleration: 1.2 m/s^{2} (3.9 ft/s^{2})
- Electric system(s): 750 V DC third rail
- UIC classification: Bo′Bo′+Bo′Bo′
- Multiple working: Mechanically with all Helsinki Metro rolling stock
- Track gauge: 1,522 mm (4 ft 11 29/32 in)

The HKL Class M200 is a class of metro trains in use on the Helsinki Metro, based on the DBAG Class 481 trains used on the Berlin S-Bahn. One train consists of two individually numbered cars. A total of 12 pairs (24 cars) were manufactured by Bombardier-DWA in Germany (with the electrical power drive systems manufactured by Alstom in France) during 2000–2001.

In 2017, the City Council of Helsinki decided to refurbish the M100 and M200 fleets in order to extend their lifetime for another 10 years. The renovation of the M200s started in early 2023, following the refurbishment of the M100s. They are being refurbished by government-owned VR FleetCare.

Up to six pairs can be combined into a 12-car train formation, however due to the relatively short length of the platforms (especially on the new Länsimetro extension), at most only two pairs (giving a 4-car formation per train; and prior to the Länsimetro opening in 2017 three pairs resulting in 6-car formations could also be seen during rush hour) can be combined for passenger service. Longer combinations are used in maintenance operations. Any Helsinki metro train types can be combined mechanically, such as for towing.

== See also ==
- Helsinki Metro
- Helsinki City Transport
- HKL Class M100
- HKL Class M300
- HKL Class M400
