= Pello, Övertorneå =

Coordinates: 66°48′10″N 023°58′45″E

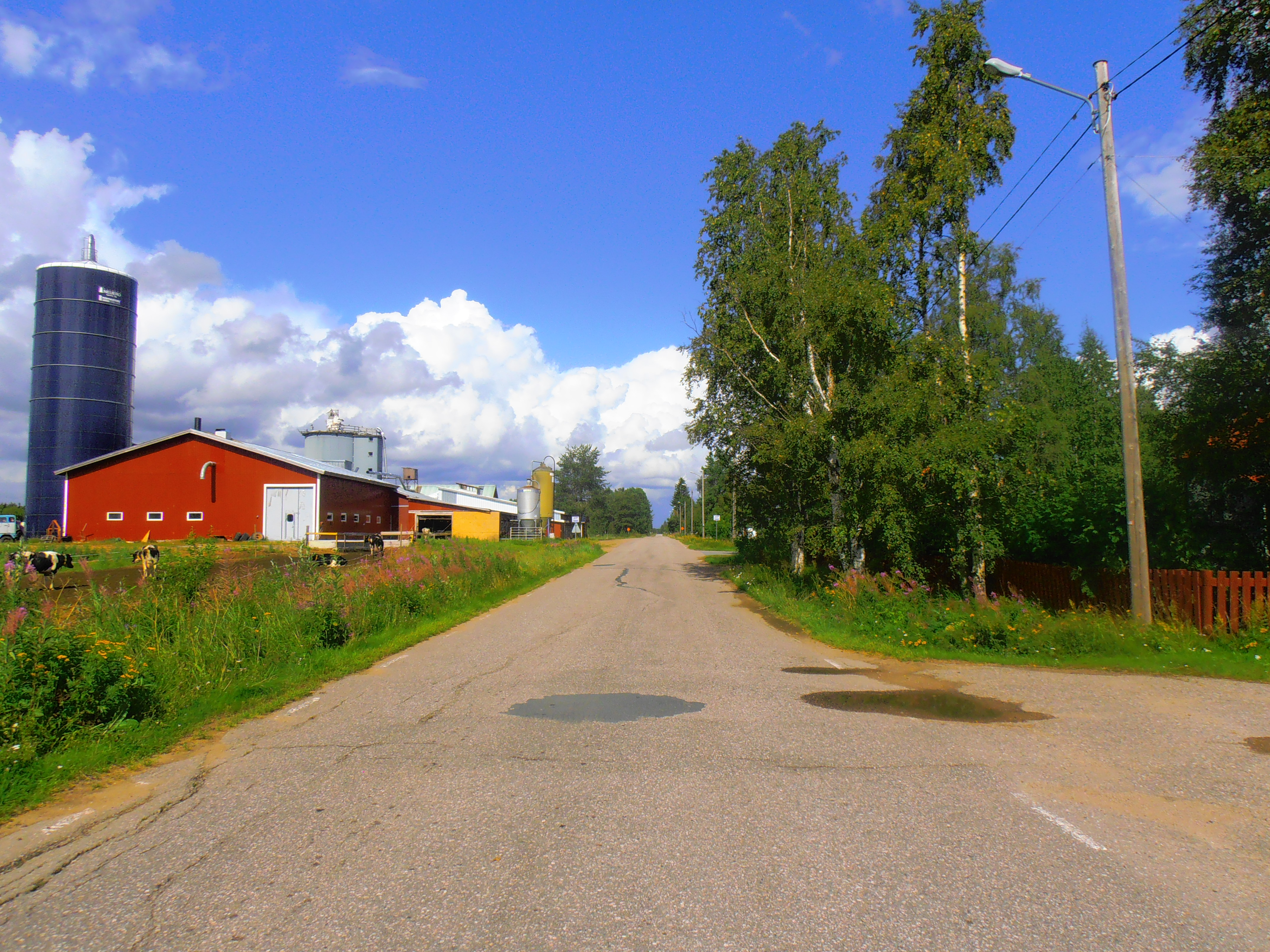
Pello Övertorneå kommun

Pello is a smaller locality in Övertorneå Municipality, Norrbotten County, Sweden. It is located on the shore of the Torne River, opposite to Pello, Finland. The locality has a population of 160.
