= VR Class Dv12 =

Class of 192 Finnish diesel locomotives

Class Dv12
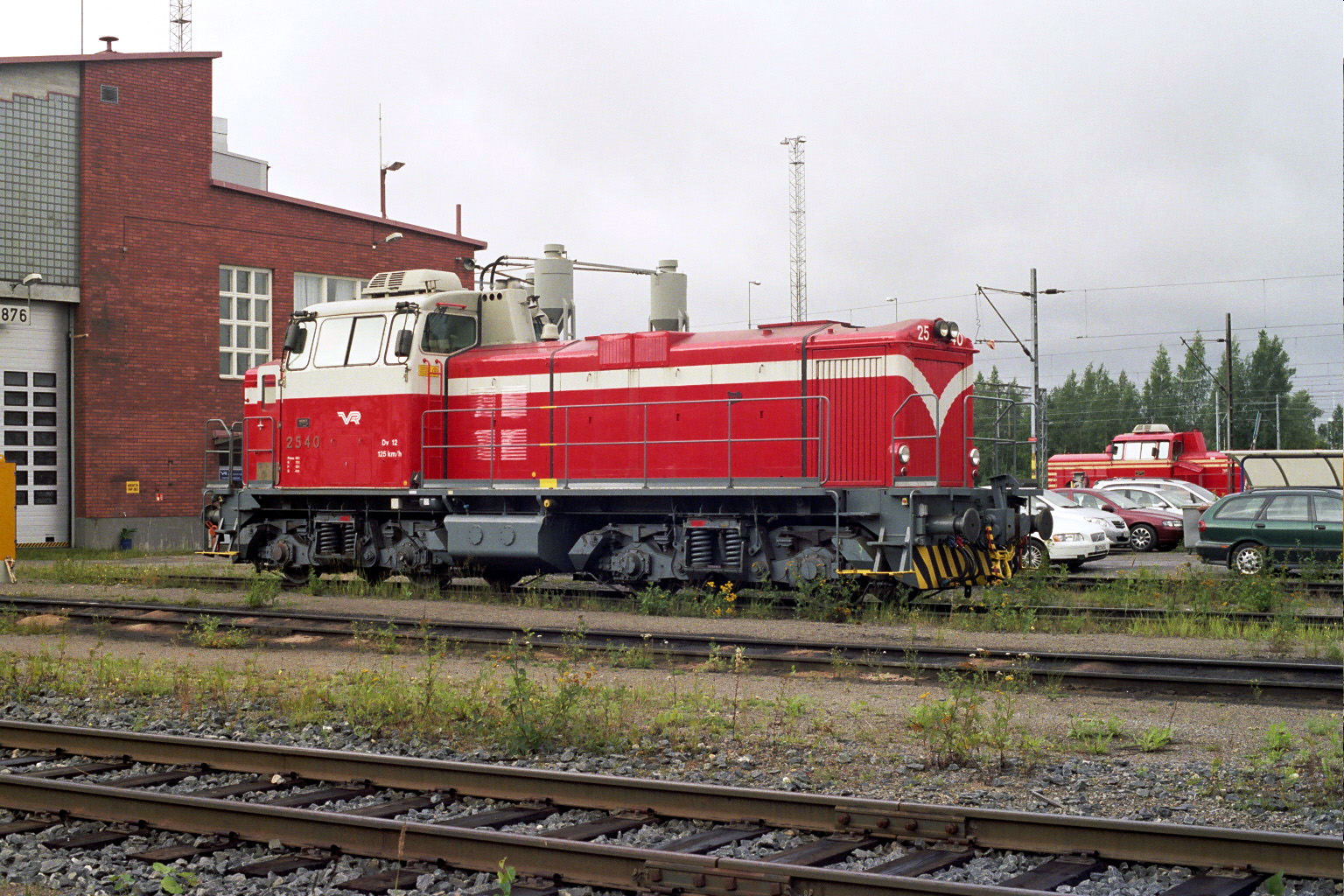
- VR class Dv12 diesel-hydraulic locomotive at Tampere Perkiö depot. In the background VR class Dr14
Type and origin
- Power type: Diesel-hydraulic
- Builder: Valmet Oy Tampere Oy Lokomo, Finland
- Build date: 1963–1984
- Total produced: 192
Specifications
- Configuration
  - AAR: B-B
  - UIC: Bo′Bo′
- Gauge: 1,524 mm (5 ft)
- Driver dia.: 1 m (3 ft 3.37 in)
- Length: 14.00 m (45 ft 11 1/8 in)
- Width: 3.24 m (10 ft 7 1/2 in)
- Height: 4.6 m (15 ft 1 1/8 in)
- Adhesive weight: 7.8 t (7.7 long tons; 8.6 short tons)
- Loco weight: 62.2 t (61.2 long tons; 68.6 short tons)
- Fuel type: Diesel
- Prime mover: Tampella MGO V16 BSHR & SACM
- Engine type: V16 diesel engine
- Cylinders: 16
- Transmission: Hydraulic Voith L 216 rs
Performance figures
- Maximum speed: 125 km/h (78 mph) or 85 km/h (53 mph)
- Power output: 1,000 kW (1,300 hp)
- Tractive effort: 200 kN (45,000 lb_{f})
Career
- Operators: VR
- Class: Dv12
- Number in class: 192
- Numbers: 2501–2568, 2601–2664, 2701–2760
- Disposition: In Service

The Dv12 (Sv12 and Sr12 until 1977) is the standard Finnish medium-weight diesel-hydraulic road switcher operated by VR. As all the main lines of Finnish railway network have been electrificied, the locomotive is designated mostly to unelectrified, less frequently used side lines. Occasionally it may still pull cargo trains on main lines. It has also been put in service as a shunter, replacing older classes Dv15 and Dv16 as they were retired. A total of 192 locomotives were built by Lokomo and Valmet between the years 1963 and 1984. As of 2025, the oldest Dv12 units still in use are 62 years old.

== Technical information ==
Views from the cab of the Dv12 locomotive (no. 2543) in 2022.

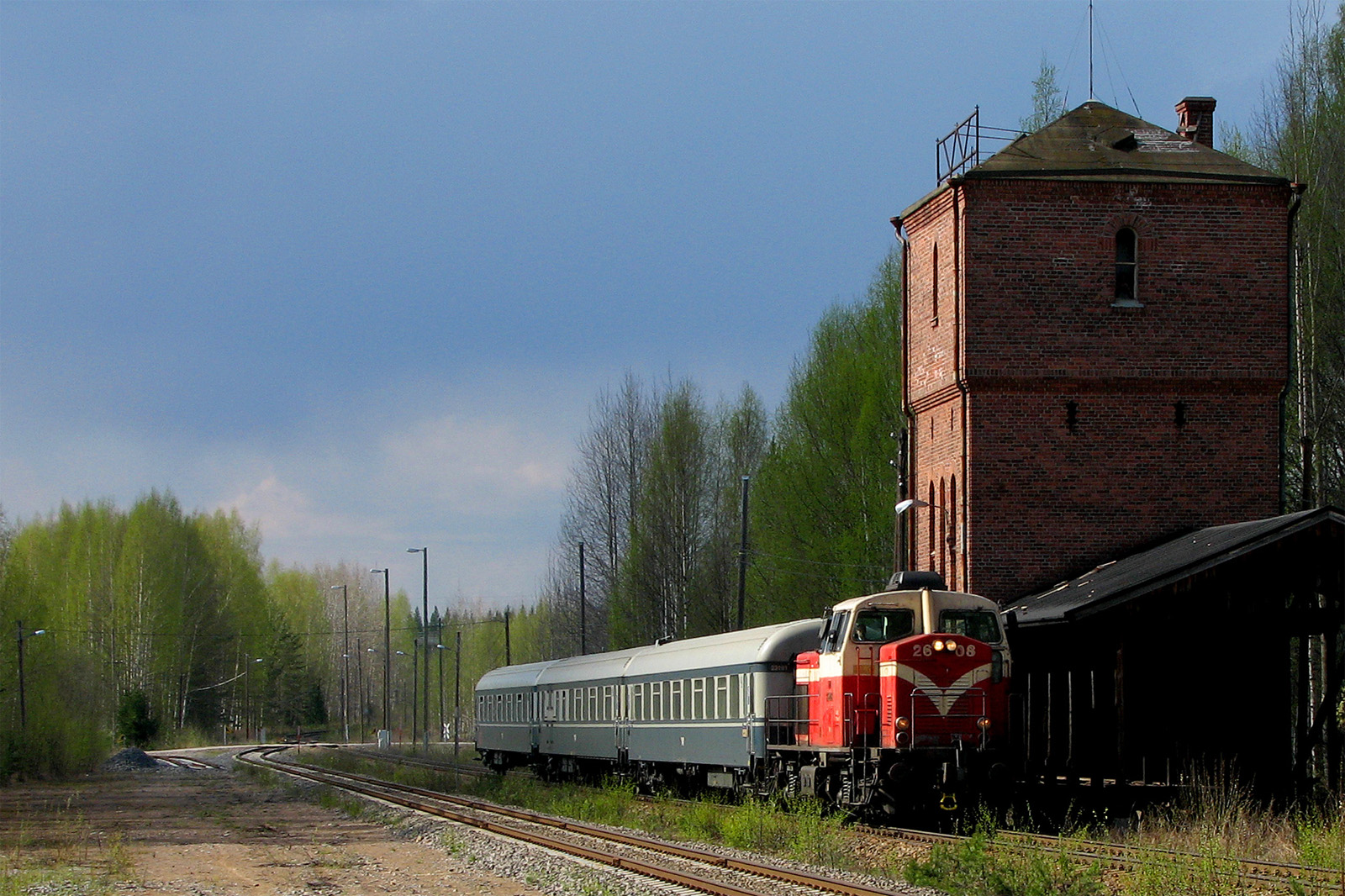
A Dv12 class diesel locomotive passes Huutokoski while pulling a regional train from Pieksämäki to Joensuu.

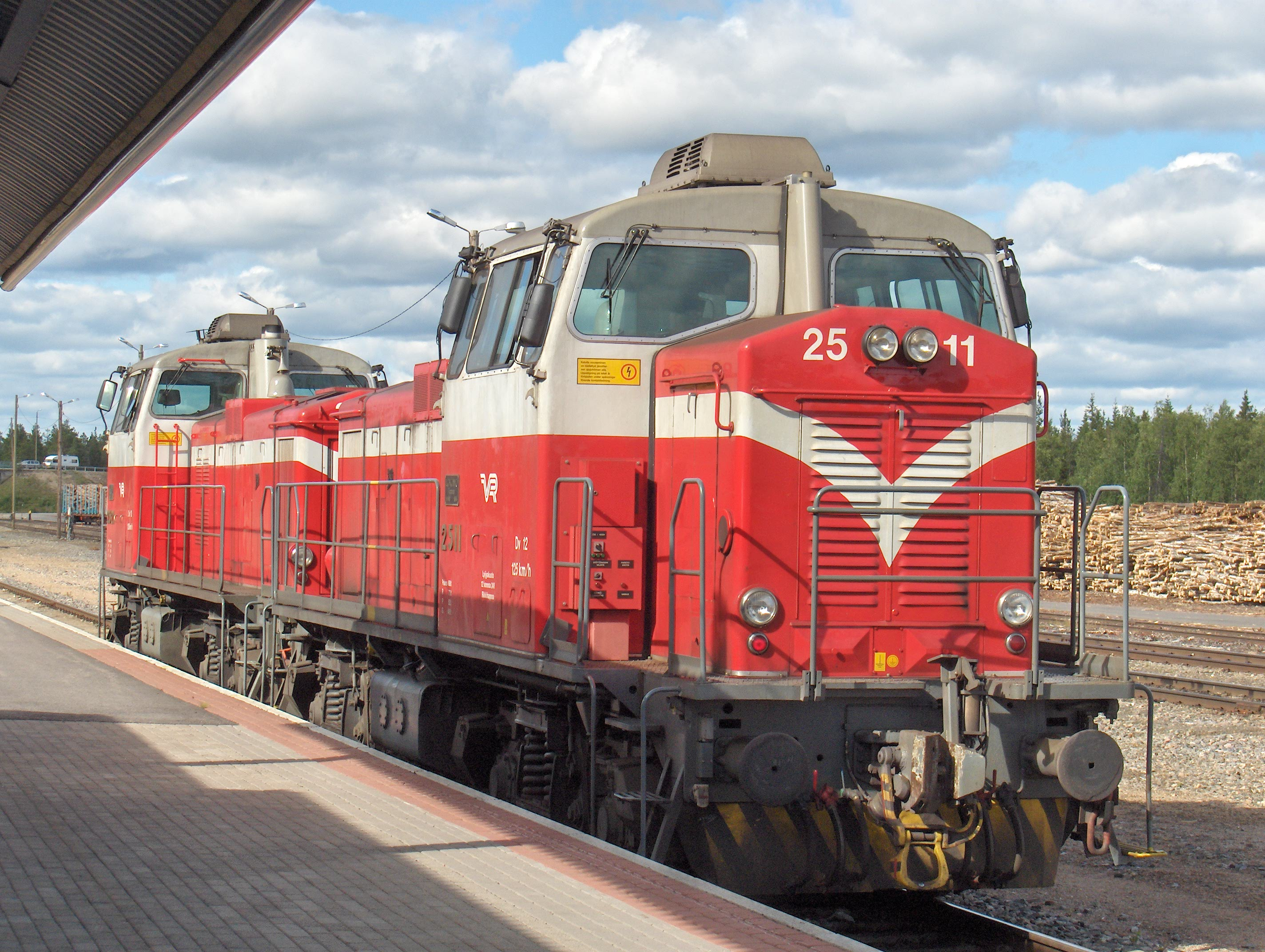
A pair of Dv12 locomotives at Kolari, July 2007

The Dv12 is a general purpose locomotive which was designed for both passenger and cargo train use. Its 1000 kW power is somewhat low by current standards, but it is capable of multiple-unit operation with only one train crew and doublets and triplets are common. It has a low axle load of 15.6 tonnes, which makes it very well suited for branch lines that allow only smaller axle loads. All the axles are interconnected with shafts and universal joints to the Voith L 216 rs hydraulic transmission. Because all axles must rotate at the same speed, the individual slipping of axles is impossible. This translates into a very good tractive effort for a 62 tonne locomotive. The main engine is a Finnish-built Tampella SACM MGO V16 BSHR Diesel with two Brown Boveri-VTR 200 M turbochargers.

The Dv12 has two speed ranges, 85 km/h (53 mph) for cargo use and 125 km/h (78 mph) for passenger use. This mechanical gear can only be switched with the locomotive at standstill.

== Variants ==
=== Sr12 ===
Between 1965 and 1972, 60 slightly heavier variants of the Sv12 were built. These were assimilated in the same series when their nomenclature changed to Dv12.

=== Sv1 ===
Dv12 number 2501 was modified between 1978 and 1980 to run on electricity instead of diesel, becoming class Sv1 number 3201. The locomotive was used first in freight traffic, later in passenger trains between Helsinki and Imatra. The Sv1 was used to test three-phase alternating current electrical engines; the results were used when developing class Dr16. The electrical components were delivered by Strömberg, which was also involved in the Dr16 project. The locomotive was painted yellow with black stripes, a colour scheme known from another short-lived prototype, the Dr15.

In 1984, after four years of testing, the Sv1 was refitted with a diesel engine, returning to its original nomenclature and number. Number 3201 is nowadays used on an Sr2 class locomotive. Dv12 number 2501 is currently, in 2019, still in use.

== Retirement and future development ==
In 2009, VR abandoned some of the older units of 2700 series Dv12s. The company plans to purchase new diesel locomotives during the 2010s.

22.10.2026 an agreement was signed between Finland and Ukraine on the donation of 10 locomotives of this type and their spare parts in near future.
