= Pello =

- Municipality
- Pellon kunta Pello kommun
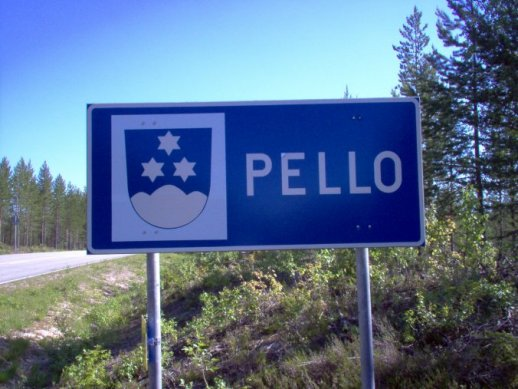

- Coat of arms

- Location of Pello in Finland
- OpenStreetMap Interactive map outlining Pello.
- Interactive map of Pello
- Coordinates: 66°46.5′N 023°58′E
- Country: Finland
- Region: Lapland
- Sub-region: Tornio Valley
- Charter: 1867

Government
  - Municipal manager: Sami Baas

Area (2018-01-01)
  - Total: 1,864.66 km^{2} (719.95 sq mi)
  - Land: 1,738.15 km^{2} (671.10 sq mi)
  - Water: 126.12 km^{2} (48.70 sq mi)
  - Rank: 35th largest in Finland
- Elevation: 64 m (210 ft)

Population (2025-12-31)
  - Total: 3,146
  - Rank: 209th largest in Finland
  - Density: 1.81/km^{2} (4.7/sq mi)

Population by native language
  - Finnish: 95.8% (official)
  - Swedish: 0.8%
  - Others: 3.4%

Population by age
  - 0 to 14: 9.3%
  - 15 to 64: 49.7%
  - 65 or older: 41%
- Time zone: UTC+02:00 (EET)
  - Summer (DST): UTC+03:00 (EEST)
- Website: www.pello.fi

Pello (formerly Turtola) is a municipality of Finland. It is located approximately 20 kilometres (12 mi) north of the Arctic Circle in the western part of the province of Lapland, and is part of the Lapland region. The municipality is on the national border with Sweden, by the Tornio River. The municipality has a population of 3,146 (31 December 2025) and covers an area of 1,864.66 square kilometres (719.95 sq mi) of which 126.12 km^{2} (48.70 sq mi) is water. The population density is 1.81 inhabitants per square kilometre (4.7/sq mi).

The municipality is unilingually Finnish, according to the legal definition in Finland.

Konttajärvi is in this municipality.

It is served by the Pello railway station.

== History ==
The name of Pello is ultimately derived from the word pelto, field; which may have been the original name of the village. The weak grade stem of pelto is pello- (e.g. pellon - genitive case form of pelto), through which the name was corrupted to its current form. The name of Turtola refers to a male name Turto, a Finnish form of the Scandinavian name Tord.

During the Late Middle Ages and the 16th century, Pello was the northernmost Finnish village in the Tornio Valley. It was a part of the Tornio parish until 1606, when said parish was divided into Alatornio and Ylitornio, from which the latter included Turtola and Pello.

After Russia conquered Finland in 1809, Ylitornio was split into two parts. The villages of Pello and Turtola were also split, which is why there is a Pello and a Turtola (Svanstein) in Sweden. The northern parts of Ylitornio became a separate parish and municipality in 1867, called Turtola after its most significant village at the time. The village of Pello later surpassed Turtola, thus the municipality was renamed to Pello in 1949.

== Climate ==
Pello has a subarctic climate (Köppen: Dfc).

Climate data for Pello kirkonkylä, 1991–2020 normals, records 1971–present)
Month	Jan	Feb	Mar	Apr	May	Jun	Jul	Aug	Sep	Oct	Nov	Dec	Year
Record high °C (°F)	9.2 (48.6)	8.6 (47.5)	11.8 (53.2)	18.7 (65.7)	28.7 (83.7)	32.0 (89.6)	32.4 (90.3)	30.1 (86.2)	24.3 (75.7)	14.8 (58.6)	11.1 (52.0)	6.9 (44.4)	32.4 (90.3)
Mean daily maximum °C (°F)	−7.5 (18.5)	−7.0 (19.4)	−0.7 (30.7)	5.2 (41.4)	12.2 (54.0)	18.0 (64.4)	20.9 (69.6)	18.2 (64.8)	12.1 (53.8)	3.8 (38.8)	−2.1 (28.2)	−5.1 (22.8)	5.7 (42.3)
Daily mean °C (°F)	−11.7 (10.9)	−11.2 (11.8)	−5.9 (21.4)	0.5 (32.9)	7.1 (44.8)	12.9 (55.2)	15.8 (60.4)	13.3 (55.9)	7.8 (46.0)	0.8 (33.4)	−5.0 (23.0)	−8.8 (16.2)	1.3 (34.3)
Mean daily minimum °C (°F)	−16.8 (1.8)	−16.2 (2.8)	−11.7 (10.9)	−4.7 (23.5)	1.7 (35.1)	7.7 (45.9)	10.8 (51.4)	8.7 (47.7)	3.9 (39.0)	−2.2 (28.0)	−8.4 (16.9)	−13.1 (8.4)	−3.4 (25.9)
Record low °C (°F)	−46.8 (−52.2)	−41.8 (−43.2)	−41.4 (−42.5)	−28.4 (−19.1)	−13.0 (8.6)	−1.7 (28.9)	0.2 (32.4)	−5.2 (22.6)	−10.4 (13.3)	−25.8 (−14.4)	−34.2 (−29.6)	−39.1 (−38.4)	−46.8 (−52.2)
Average precipitation mm (inches)	38 (1.5)	30 (1.2)	30 (1.2)	28 (1.1)	35 (1.4)	57 (2.2)	74 (2.9)	61 (2.4)	46 (1.8)	42 (1.7)	46 (1.8)	41 (1.6)	526 (20.7)
Average precipitation days (≥ 1.0 mm)	10	9	7	7	7	9	11	9	8	9	11	11	108
Average relative humidity (%) (daily average)	87	86	79	71	65	65	71	78	84	89	92	89	80
Source 1: FMI normals 1991-2020
Source 2: Record highs and lows

== Notable people ==
- Kaarlo Castrén (1860–1938), politician; the Prime Minister of Finland
- Paavo Lipponen (born 1941), politician; the Prime Minister of Finland
- Toivo Mäkikyrö (born 1957), biathlete
- Eero Mäntyranta (1937–2013), cross-country skiers
- Timo K. Mukka (1944–1973), author
- Olli-Markus Taivainen (born 1989), ski-orienteering competitor
