= ArcticRail =

Finnish freight rail operator

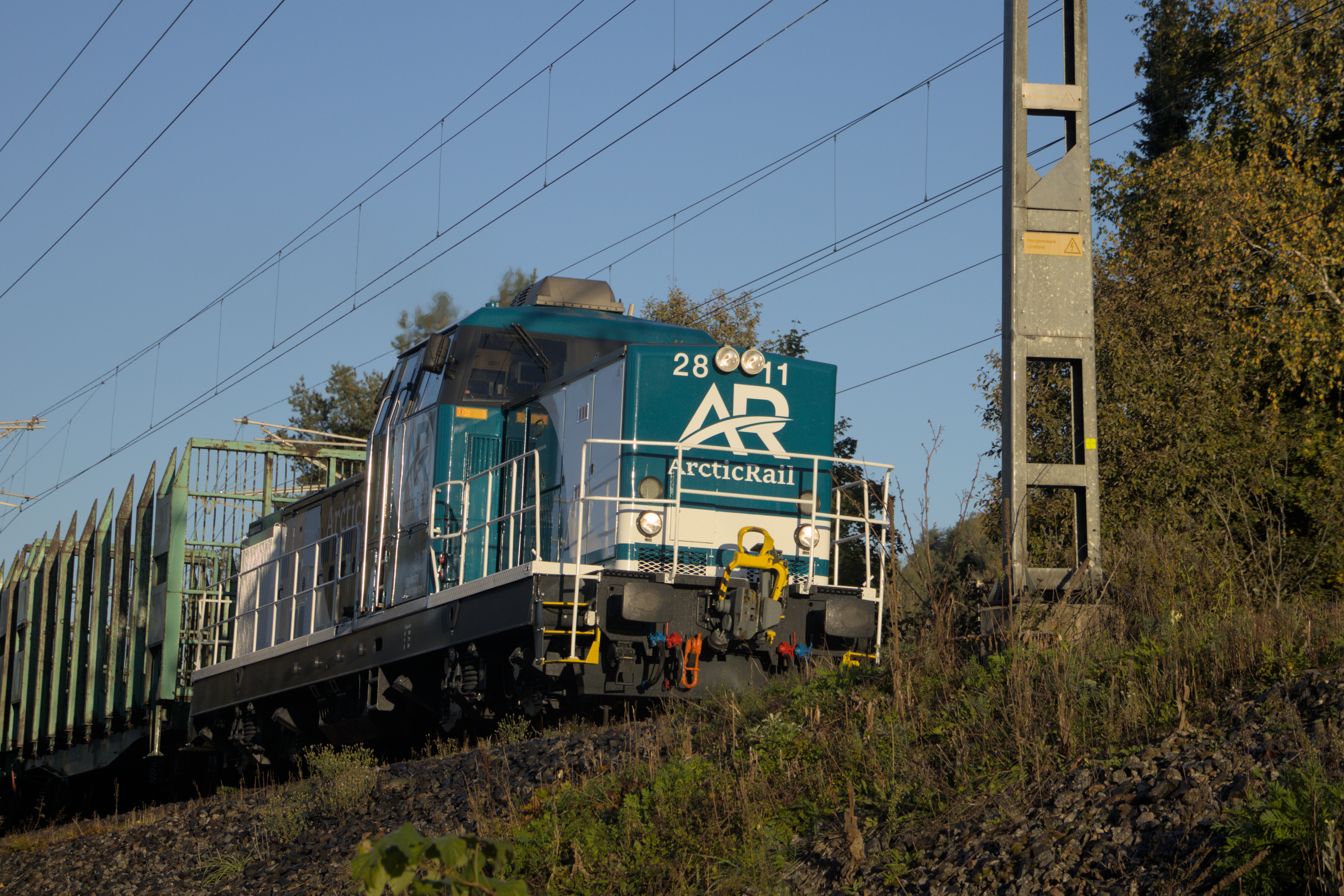
- Class Dr16 diesel locomotive in ArcticRail's livery
- Company type: Osakeyhtiö
- Industry: Rail transport
- Founded: 2023; 3 years ago
- Area served: Finland
- Website: www.arcticrail.fi

ArcticRail Oy is a private Finnish freight railway operator founded in 2023. The company has acquired two used class Dr16 diesel locomotives from the state-owned VR Group, as well as a class Dr35 shunting locomotive and some goods wagons. In September 2025, it started operating lumber trains into UPM's factory in Kymi.
