= HKL Class M300 =

Class of Helsinki Metro trains

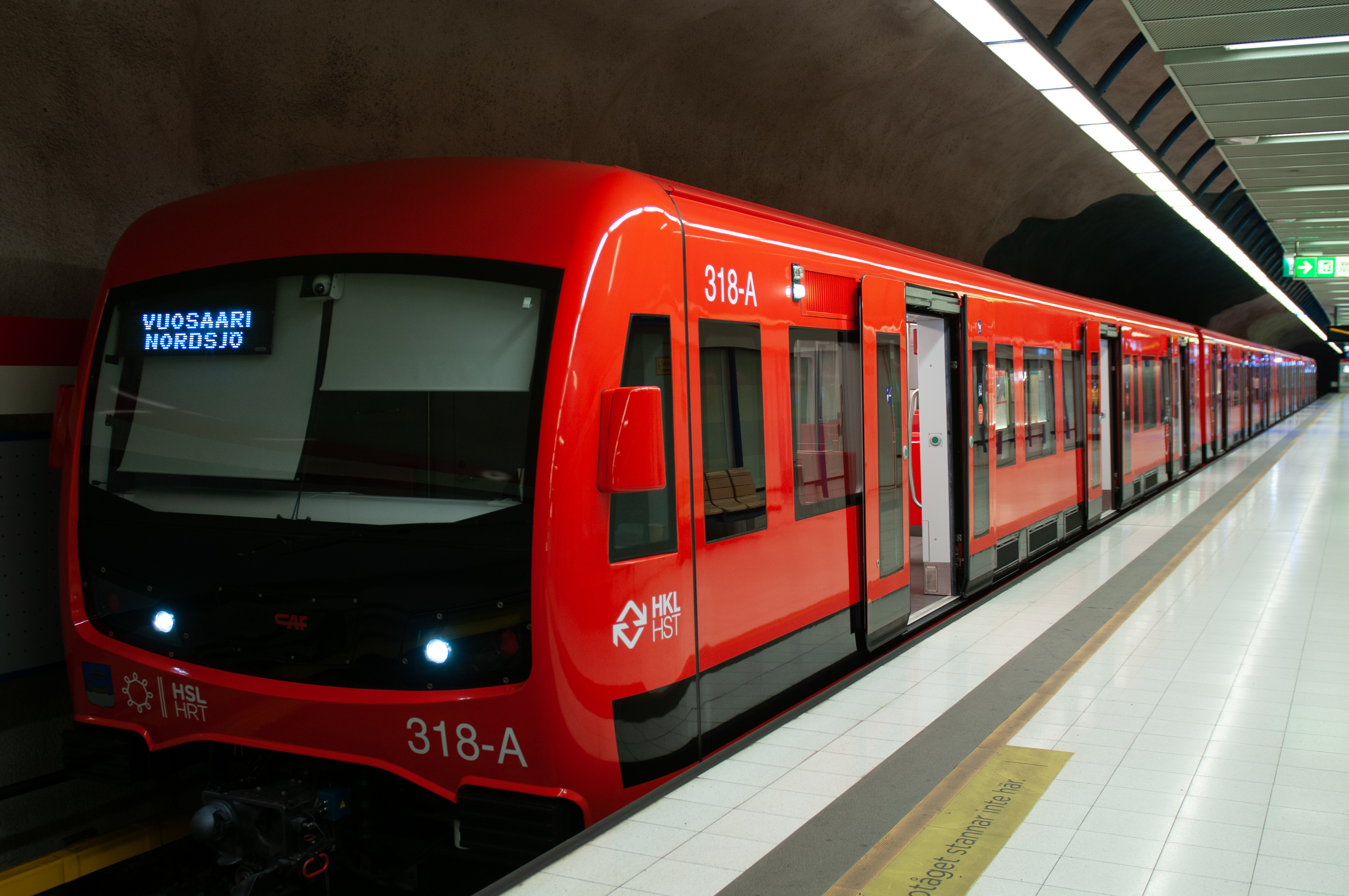
- A M300 train at Ruoholahti Station, July 2017

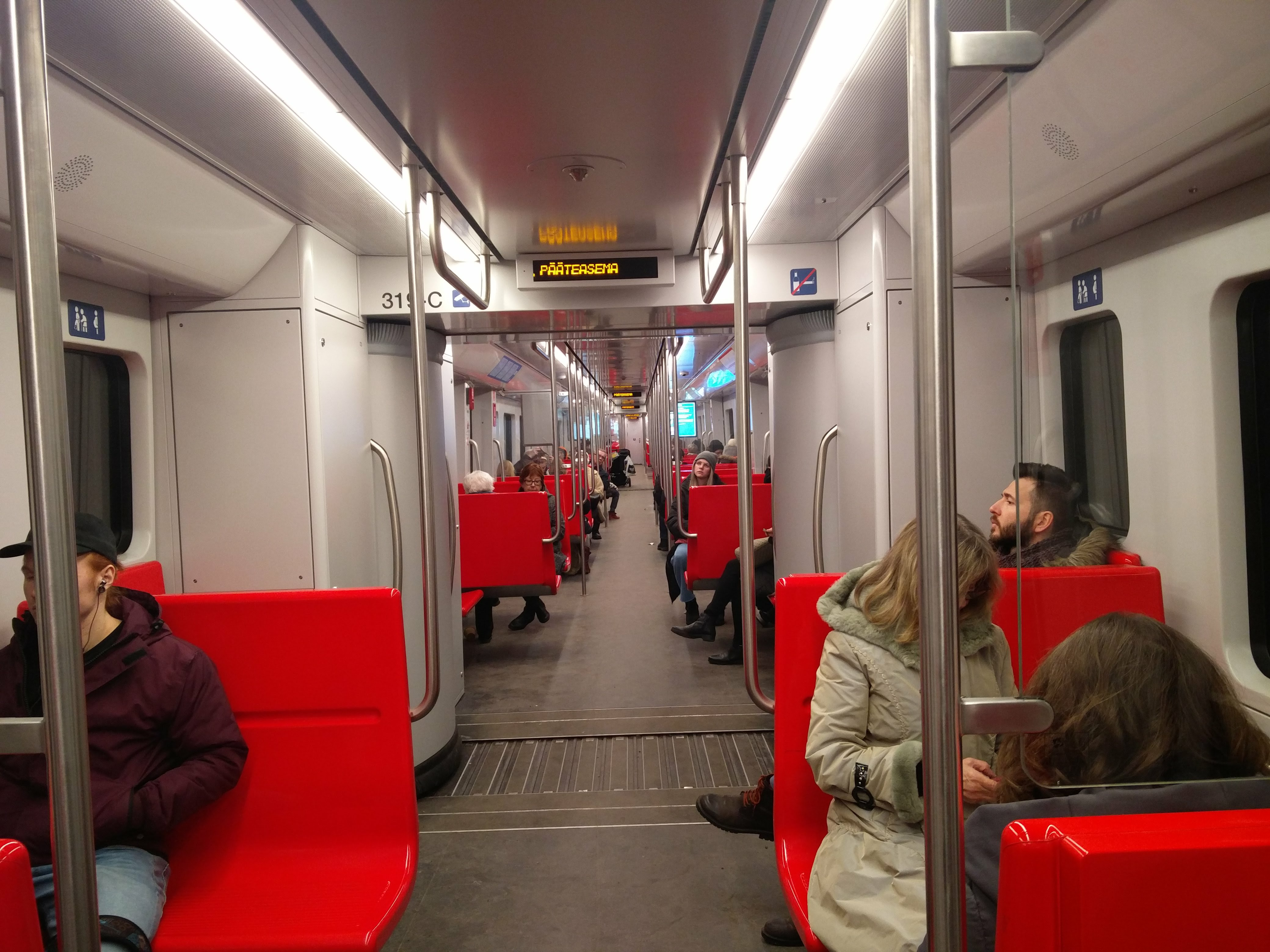
- Interior of a M300 carriage
- Manufacturer: Construcciones y Auxiliar de Ferrocarriles (CAF)
- Assembly: Zaragoza, Spain
- Family name: Inneo
- Constructed: 2014–2016, 2022
- Entered service: 2016
- Refurbished: 2021–2022
- Number built: 25 units
- Number in service: 25 units
- Predecessor: HKL Class M200
- Formation: 4 cars
- Fleet numbers: 301–325
- Capacity: 576 in total, 228 seated
- Operators: Helsinki City Transport
- Depots: Roihupelto, Sammalvuori
- Lines served: Helsinki Metro: M1, M2

Specifications
- Train length: 88.22 m (289 ft 5 1/4 in)
- Width: 3.2 m (10 ft 6 in)
- Height: 3.7 m (12 ft 1 11/16 in)
- Doors: 3 sets of double doors per car
- Wheel diameter: 850–760 mm (33–30 in) (new–worn)
- Maximum speed: 80 km/h (50 mph)
- Traction system: CAF IGBT-VVVF
- Traction motors: 12 × TSA TMR 50-20-4 230 kW (310 hp)
- Power output: 2.76 MW (3,700 hp)
- Transmission: 7.44 : 1 gear ratio
- Electric system(s): 750 V DC third rail
- UIC classification: Bo′Bo′+Bo′Bo′+2′2′+Bo′Bo′
- Multiple working: Mechanically with all Helsinki Metro rolling stock
- Track gauge: 1,522 mm (4 ft 11 29/32 in)

The HKL Class M300 is a class of metro trains operated by Metropolitan Area Transport Ltd in use on the Helsinki Metro. 20 four-carriage trains were built between 2014 and 2016 by Construcciones y Auxiliar de Ferrocarriles for the Länsimetro extension. In November 2019, HKL announced the purchase of five additional trains, delivered in 2022.

The M300 units were ordered in preparation for the automation of the metro, but this has been delayed until the early 2030s, the trains retaining their temporary cabs. The class was refreshed in 2021-2022, with the addition of air-conditioning and an updated driving desk.

== Accidents and incidents ==
- On 27 July 2016, M100 carriage no. 157 was involved in an accident with M300 unit no. 302 when the latter derailed near Itäkeskus metro station during testing.

== See also ==
- Helsinki Metro
- Helsinki City Transport
- HKL Class M100
- HKL Class M200
- HKL Class M400
