= Kolari railway station =

Railway station in Kolari, Finland

Kolari
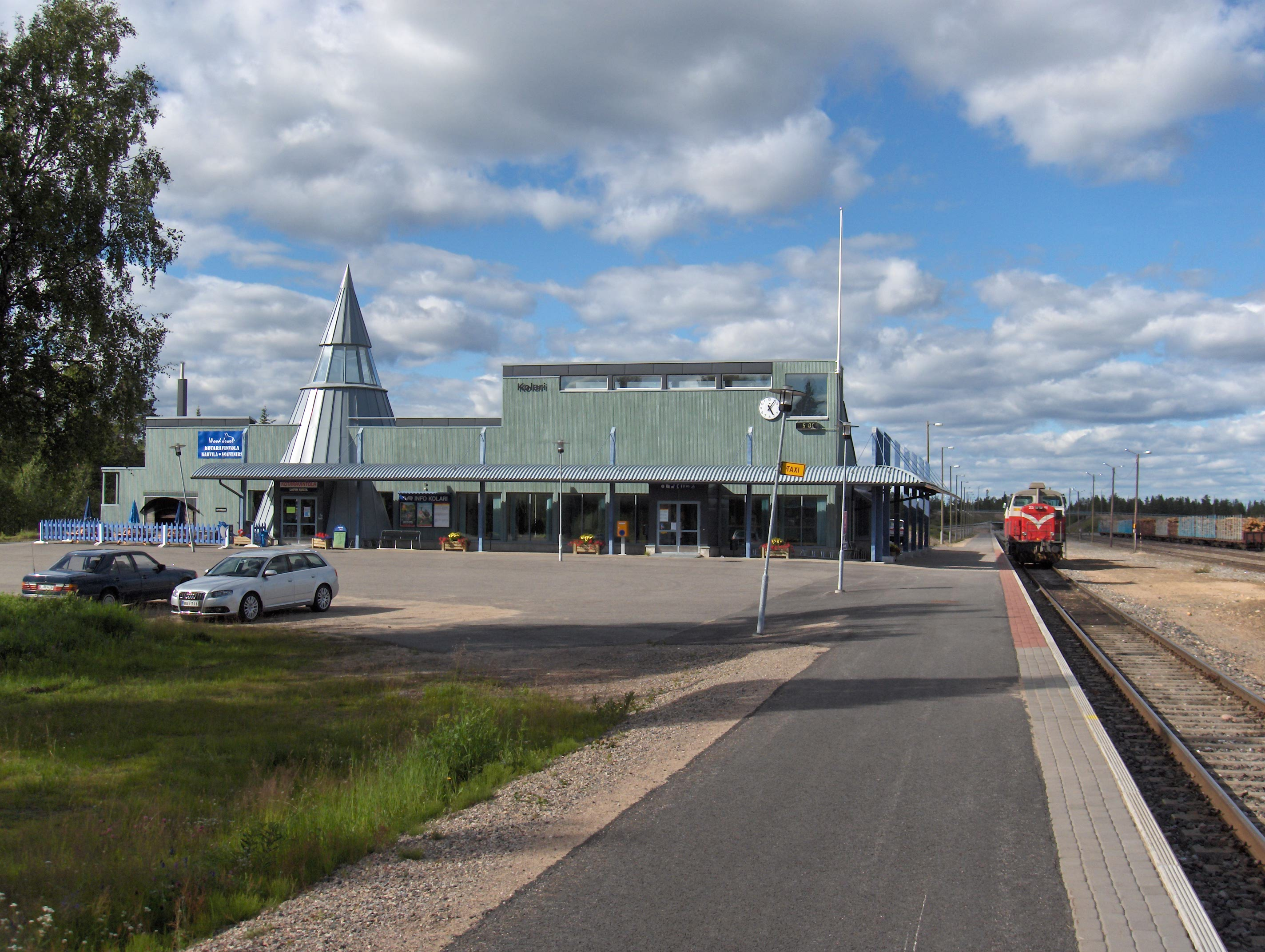

General information
- Location: Asematie, 95900 Kolari
- Coordinates: 67°20′56″N 023°50′09″E
- Elevation: 150 metres (490 ft)
- Owner: Finnish Transport Infrastructure Agency
- Line: Kolari railway
- Tracks: 1

Construction
- Structure type: ground station

History
- Opened: 1 December 1966 (freight traffic); February 1985 (passenger traffic)

Passengers
- 80,000

Services
Preceding station	VR Group	Following station
Pello towards Helsinki	Helsinki–Kolari (overnight service)	Terminus
Location

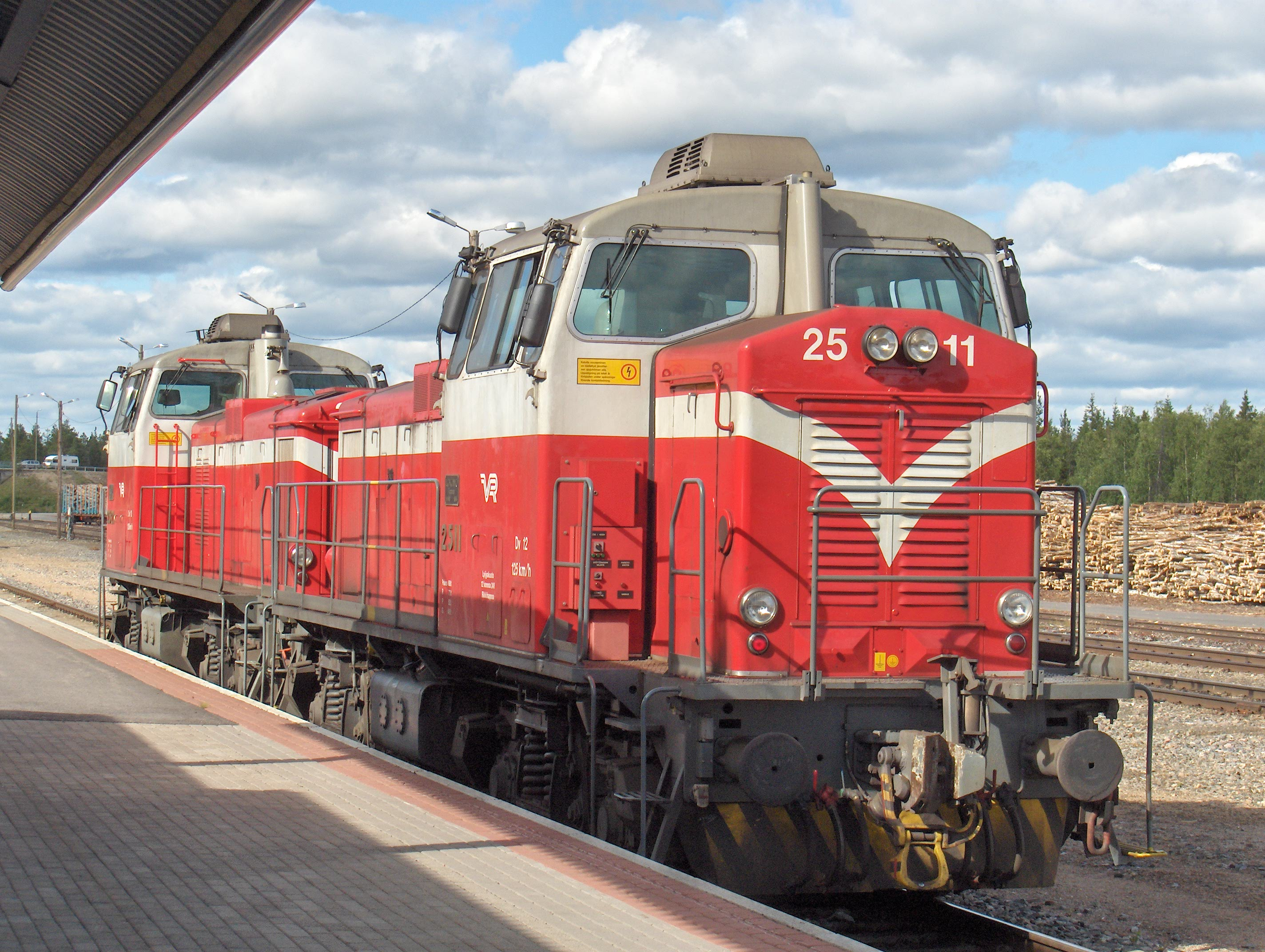
VR Class Dv12 locomotives at Kolari

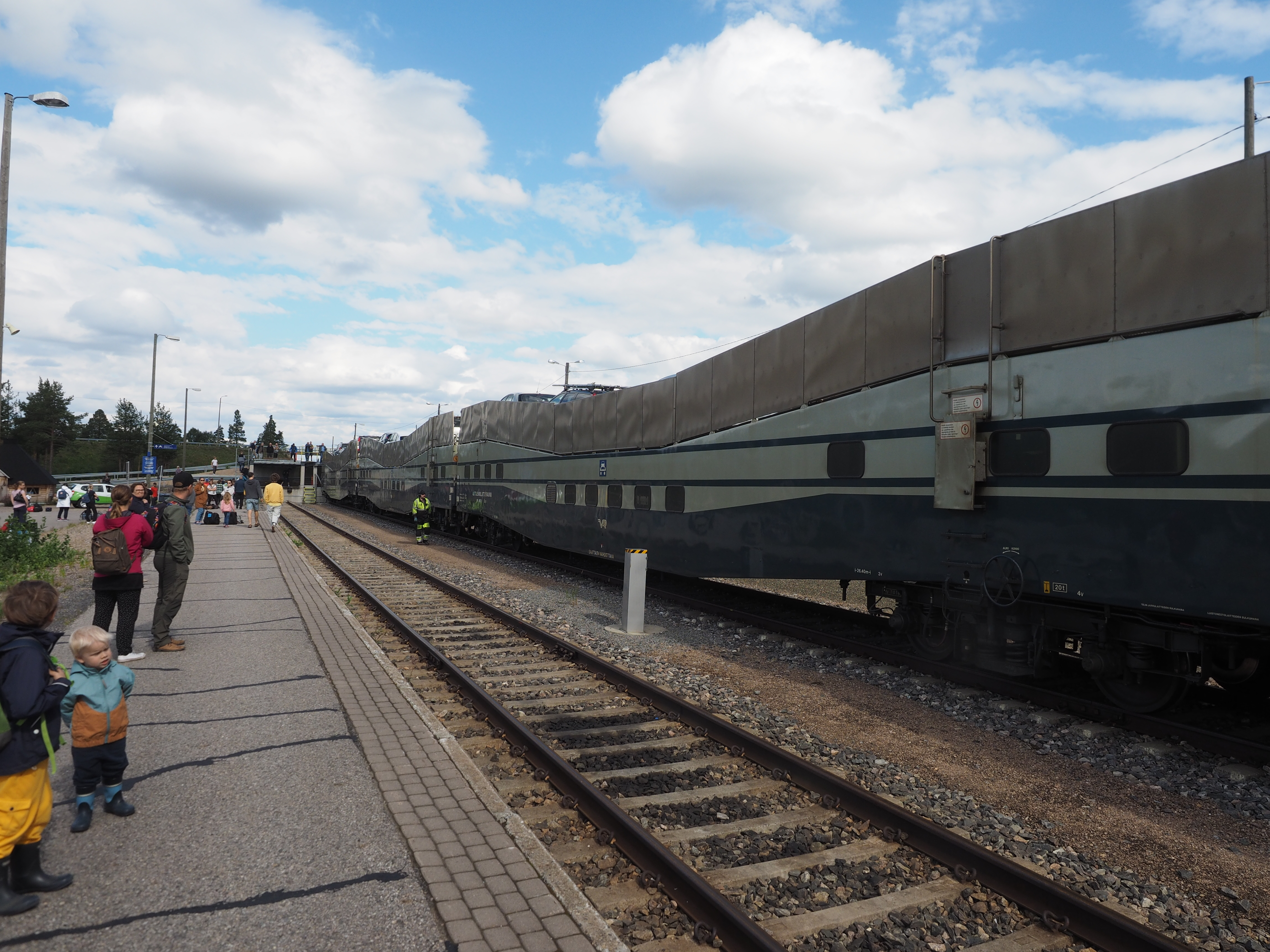
Car transport wagons at Kolari railway station

Kolari railway station is located in the municipality of Kolari in the Lapland region of Finland, situated almost 3 km (1.9 mi) northeast of Kolari center, in Ylläsjokisuu. It is the northernmost railway station in Finland, located 800 km (500 mi) north of Helsinki Central railway station. The railway track extends 18 km (11 mi) further north to the Rautuvaara railway yard but this section is disused - the Rautuvaara iron ore mine closed in 1989.

Kolari station is the terminus of the track from Tornio to Kolari, and serves both passenger and cargo traffic. Passenger traffic is at its highest during the skiing season and, as well as Kolari, the station also serves Levi (85 km (53 mi) away), Ylläs (85 km (53 mi) away), Äkäslompolo (40 km (25 mi) away), Pallas (100 km (62 mi) away) and Muonio (80 km (50 mi) away), all of which can be reached by bus from the station, and additionally, the Swedish village of Pajala (30 km (19 mi) away). For part of the year, the station is also served by car transporter trains from Helsinki, Turku and Tampere.

The first passenger train to Kolari arrived at the station in 1985. Currently the station serves almost 80 thousand passengers per year.

A new station building designed by Ilpo Väisänen was constructed at Kolari in 1998, in the style of a goahti. Most trains (both freight and passenger) at Kolari are hauled by VR Class Dr16 diesel locomotives, with smaller Dv12 locomotives also seeing use.

Ticket sales at the station were discontinued on 2 August 2014, but there is a ticket vending machine at the station.
