= Škoda Transtech =

Finnish rolling stock manufacturer

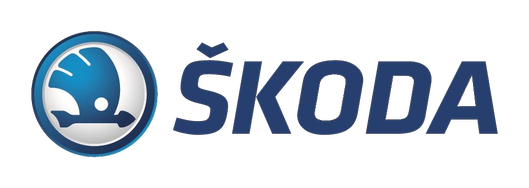
- Type: Limited company
- Industry: Rolling stock manufacturing
- Founded: 1985
- Headquarters: Oulu, Finland
- Key people: Petr Witowski (CEO)
- Products: Low-floor trams, double-deck railway coaches
- Revenue: €128.7 million (2025)
- Operating income: −€10.3 million (2025)
- Number of employees: 556 (2025)
- Parent: Škoda Transportation
- Website: Official website

Škoda Transtech Oy is a Finnish rolling-stock manufacturer and part of the Czech Škoda Group. Its headquarters are in Oulu and its factory is in Otanmäki, Kajaani. Its main products are low-floor trams and double-deck railway coaches. The company also maintains rolling stock and manufactures welded metal structures under contract.

Transtech began in 1985 as Rautaruukki’s freight-wagon business and later expanded into passenger coaches and trams. Škoda Transportation bought 75% of Transtech in 2015 and the remaining shares in May 2018.

Former Transtech oy logo

== History ==
Transtech was established in 1985 as part of Rautaruukki, which started manufacturing freight wagons in Otanmäki and Taivalkoski. The Otanmäki factory provided replacement employment as the local mine closed, and many former miners moved into wagon production. The first timber wagons were shipped from Otanmäki to the Soviet Union in November 1985, before the factory's official opening in 1986. Soviet orders formed the basis of the factory's early business. The loss of Soviet orders in the early 1990s left the factory with unsold wagons and led to layoffs.

In 1991, Valmet's railway rolling-stock operations in Tampere, which manufactured coaches and locomotives, were incorporated into Transtech. During the 1990s, Otanmäki built the first two Pendolino trains for VR. The factory then used the aluminium-welding techniques developed for the Pendolinos to build double-deck passenger coaches. Rautaruukki sold the Taivalkoski factory to Telatek in 1998.

Rautaruukki sold Transtech to Patentes Talgo in June 1999. The Spanish manufacturer was interested in its aluminium-construction expertise, freight-wagon designs and access to northern European markets. Under Talgo ownership, the company became known as Talgo Oy. Weak demand contributed to a €5.7 million loss in 2003. Finnish investor group Pritech bought the company in March 2007 and changed its name back to Transtech.

Škoda Transportation acquired a 75% stake in August 2015, with the Finnish company Sinituote retaining the remaining shares. Škoda bought Sinituote's 25% stake in May 2018, and the company was renamed Škoda Transtech that October.

Transtech competed with Stadler for an order of 63 trams for Helsinki and Vantaa. Stadler won the tender after Transtech's bid was excluded for failing to meet mandatory technical requirements. Finland's Market Court rejected Transtech's appeal in March 2026, and the Supreme Administrative Court refused leave to appeal in June. Transtech announced in August that it would cut 117 jobs, citing the loss of the order.

== Rolling stock ==
Transtech manufactures railway coaches and low-floor trams, and has also built diesel-electric locomotives. Its products include double-deck passenger, restaurant, sleeping and driving coaches, as well as car carriers and Artic trams.

Vehicle	Customer or system	Country	Notes
Dr16 diesel-electric locomotives	VR	Finland	Transtech manufactured part of the series originally built by Valmet.
Double-deck railway coaches	VR	Finland	Passenger, restaurant, sleeping and driving coaches. VR ordered nine additional sleeping coaches in January 2023.
Car-carrier coaches	VR	Finland	Used on overnight car-train services. VR ordered eight additional vehicles in January 2023.
Artic trams	Helsinki tram network	Finland	Low-floor articulated trams supplied to Helsinki.
Artic trams	Schöneiche–Rüdersdorf	Germany	Two Helsinki prototype vehicles acquired in 2018, followed by a newly built tram in 2019.
ForCity Smart Artic X54 trams	Raide-Jokeri	Finland	Double-ended light rail vehicles manufactured at Otanmäki.
ForCity Smart Artic trams	Tampere light rail	Finland	By the end of 2025, 28 trams had been delivered. A further 7 trams were ordered, along with extensions to lengthen existing vehicles.
Rhein-Neckar-Tram	Rhein-Neckar-Verkehr	Germany	Car bodies and bogie frames welded at Otanmäki; fitting out, bogie assembly and initial testing undertaken in Plzeň.
ForCity Smart Artic trams	Uppsala tramway	Sweden	Contracts signed in June 2026 covered 20 trams, with options for another 18.

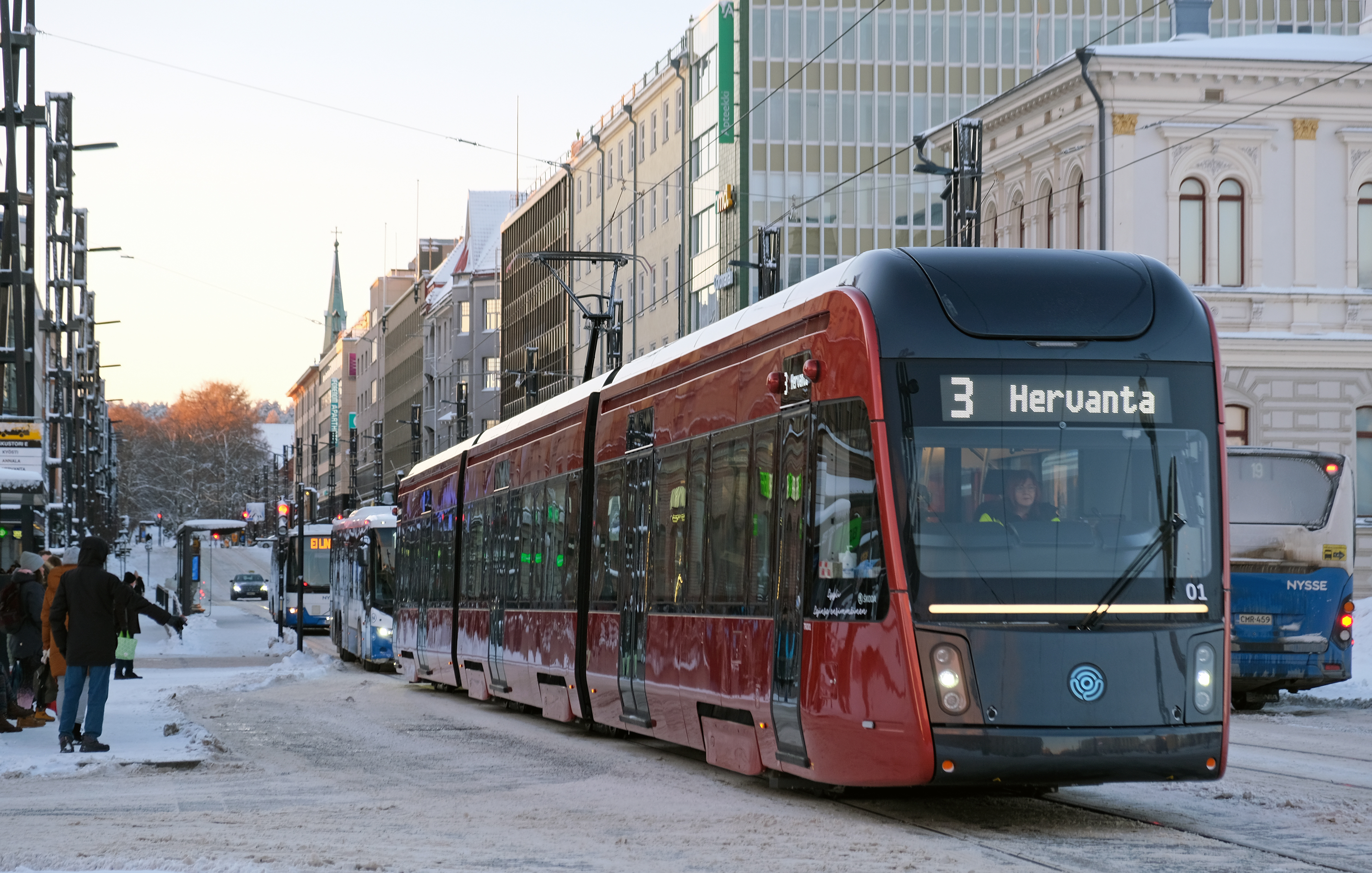
Artic tram in Tampere

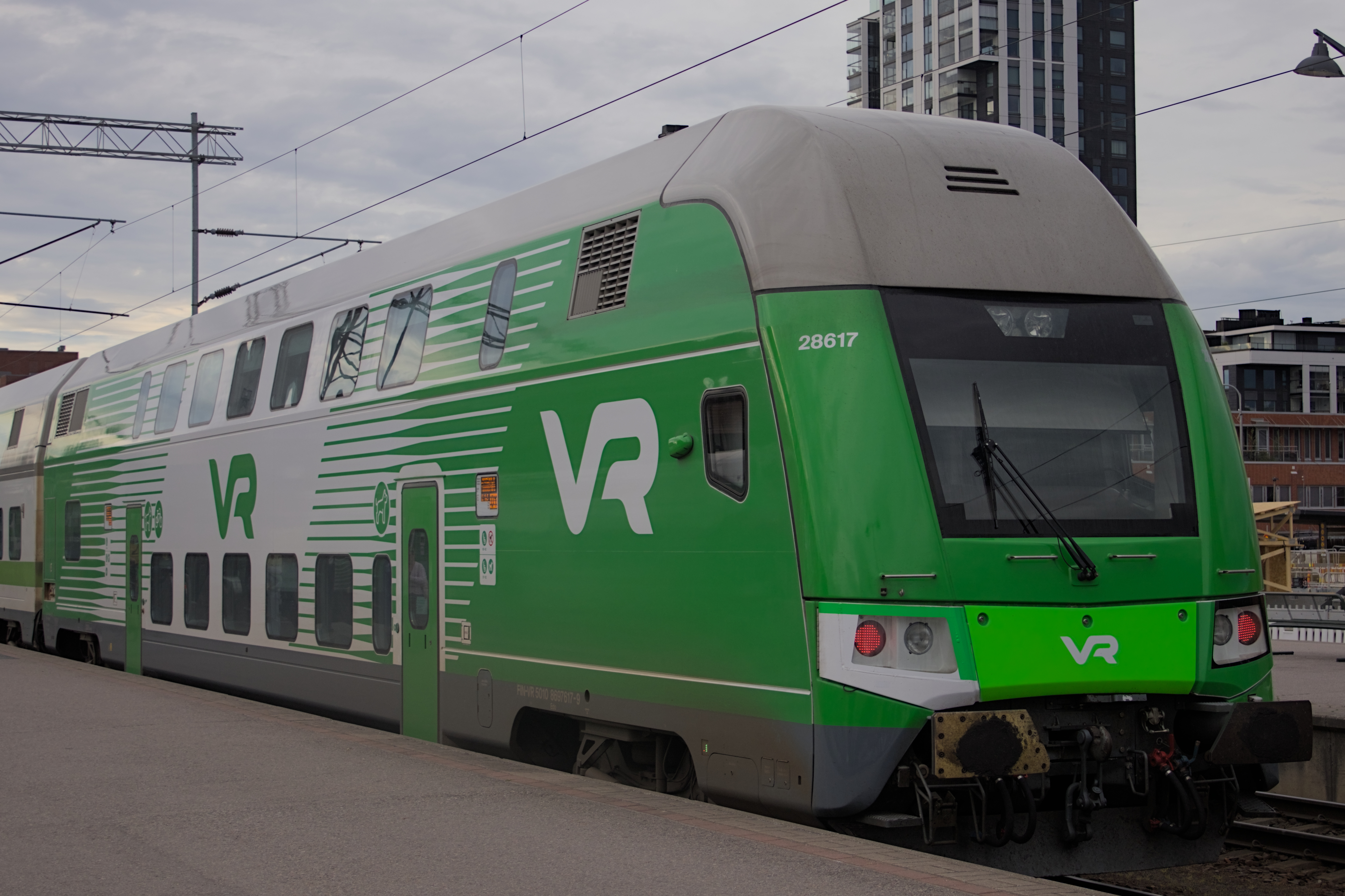
VR Class Edo double-deck driving carriage built at Otanmäki

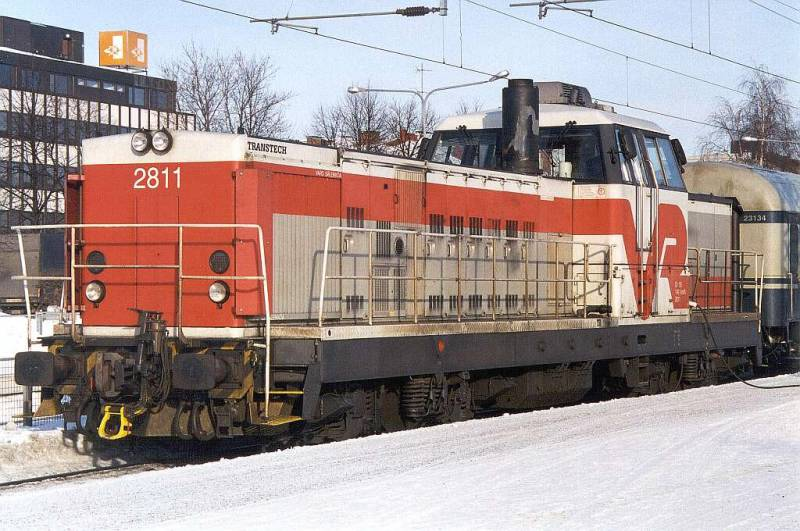
Dr16 locomotive built by Transtech

== Location ==
The company's office is located in Oulu and its main manufacturing base is in Otanmäki, Kajaani. The company’s sales office as well as maintenance services are located in Helsinki.

== See also ==
- Lokomo
