= VR Class Dr16 =

Class of Finnish diesel-electric locomotives

Class Dr16
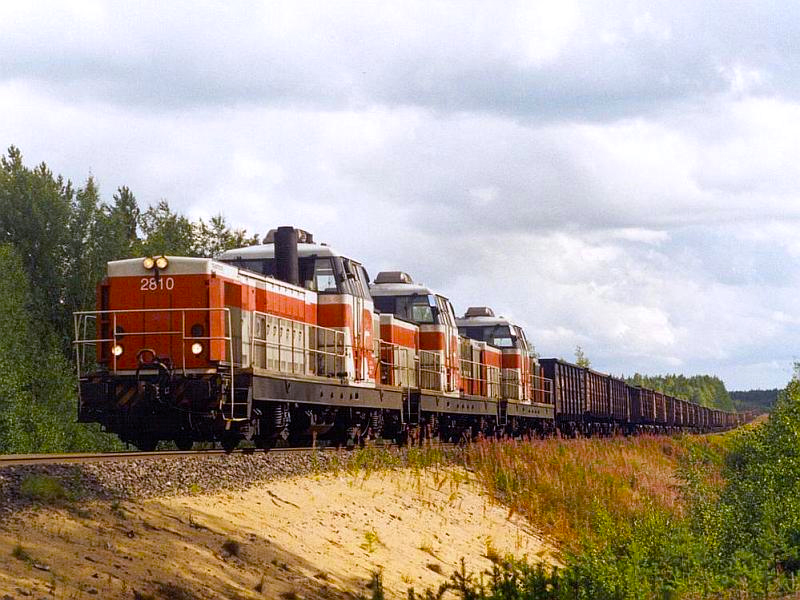
- Three Dr16s heading a freight train at Hangas, near Pikkarala, northern Finland, 2001
Type and origin
- Power type: Diesel-electric
- Builder: Valmet Oy, Tampere (numbers 2801–2809); Transtech Oy, Otanmäki and Taivalkoski (numbers 2810–2823); Oy Strömberg Ab, inverters, generator and motors
- Serial number: 2801-2823
- Build date: 1985–1992
- Total produced: 23
Specifications
- Configuration
  - UIC: Bo′Bo′
- Gauge: 1,524 mm (5 ft)
- Wheel diameter: 1,250 mm (49.21 in)
- Length: 17.60 m (57 ft 9 in)
- Width: 3.2 m (10 ft 6 in)
- Height: 4.73 m (15 ft 6 in)
- Axle load: 20.5 t (20.2 long tons; 22.6 short tons)/21 t (21 long tons; 23 short tons)
- Loco weight: 82 t (81 long tons; 90 short tons)/84 t (83 long tons; 93 short tons)
- Fuel type: Diesel
- Prime mover: Pielstick 12PA4-V-200VG; Wärtsilä Vaasa 8V22 (2803/2804)
- Transmission: Inverter-driven three-phase AC induction motors
Performance figures
- Maximum speed: 140 km/h (87 mph)
- Power output: 1,677 kW (2,249 hp) (1,500 kW (2,000 hp) 2803/2804)
- Tractive effort: 270 kN (61,000 lbf)
Career
- Operators: VR Group; ArcticRail
- Class: Dr16
- Number in class: 18
- Numbers: 2805–2823
- Nicknames: Iso Vaalee (Big White)
- Locale: northern and eastern Finland
- Delivered: 22 April 1985-30 June 1992
- First run: 1986
- Last run: 7 September 2025
- Restored: 3 April 2024-
- Scrapped: 20 February 2000-
- Current owner: Arcticrail
- Disposition: In service

The Dr16 is a class of diesel-electric locomotives built for VR Group. The 23 locomotives have a single, off-centre cab. Their nickname is "Iso Vaalee" (Big Blonde). They are presently mainly used on heavy freight services in northern Finland; their main passenger duty is the haulage of trains on the non-electrified line between Kemi and Kolari in Lapland. Dr16 locomotives were also used extensively on the line between Oulu and Rovaniemi, prior to the completion of the electrification of the line in 2004.

VR plans to retire its Dr16 locomotives by the end of 2025. VR class Dr16 2819 and 2821 were the last locomotives to retire from VR fleet in March 2026

== History ==
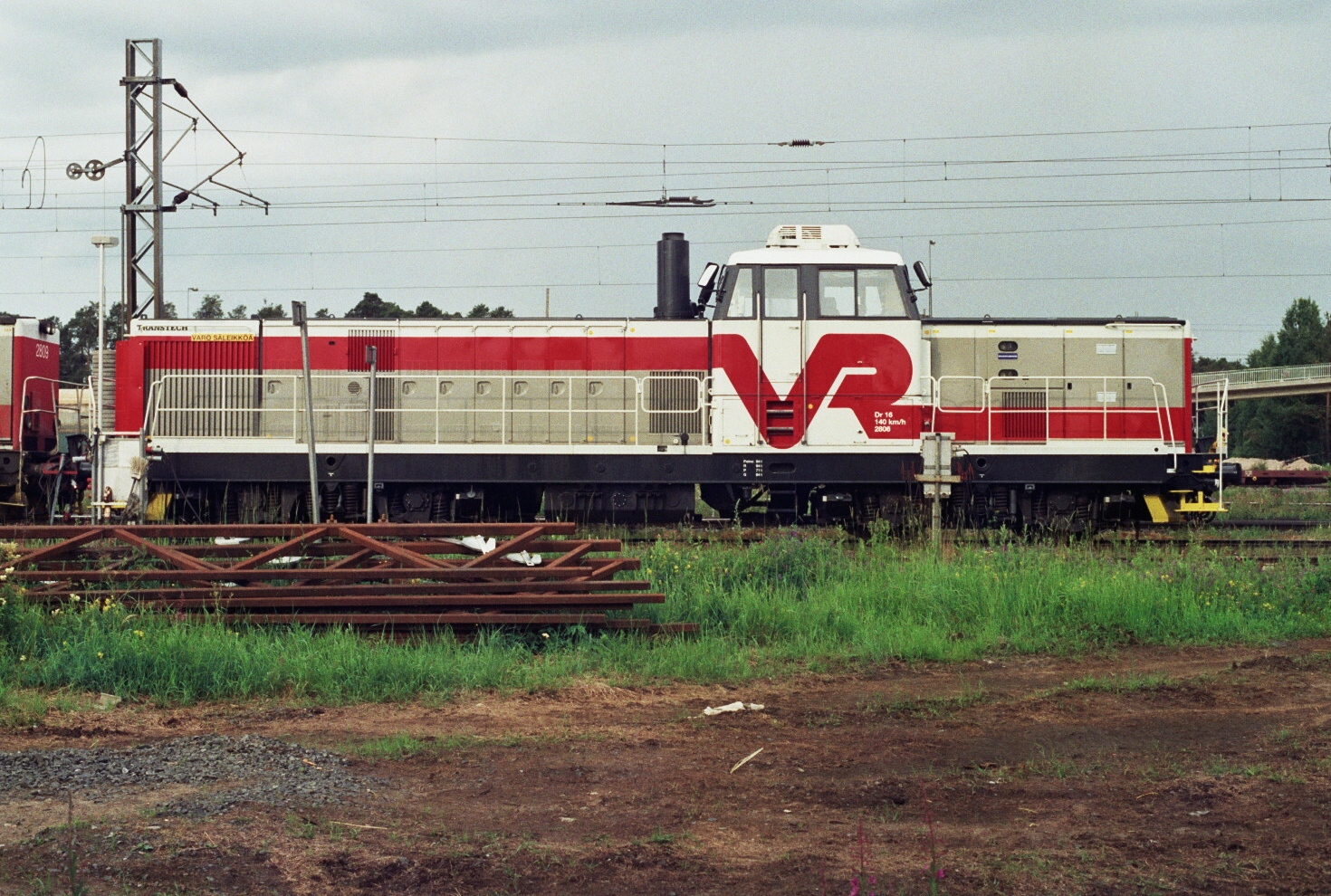
A Dr16 class locomotive at Oulu in 2009.

In the beginning of the 1980s, Valtionrautatiet needed new locomotives to replace its aging Dr12 and Dv12 class diesel locomotives. The company had installed a bigger engine on a Dr12 (which became the Dr15) and modified one Dv12 to run on electricity instead of diesel. However, the company wanted a totally new locomotive, and finally chose Valmet's type M in 1983, with Strömberg providing the electrical components. VR originally ordered 23 locomotives, with an option of 20 more when the first series were delivered.

=== Four prototypes ===
It was originally planned that two locomotives would be first built as prototypes, the first of them being fitted with a Wärtsilä engine and the second one with the Pielstick. When the first prototype ran on its own on 22 April 1985 for the first time, there was a Pielstick engine under its engine cover, because the Wärtsilä one had proved three tons too heavy. When completion of the Wärtsilä engine was delayed a second time, the second prototype was also fitted with a Pielstick. Due to these engine problems, the number of prototypes was extended to four in January 1986. The locomotives, numbered 2801–2804, were taken into service in 1985–1987: the first two had a Pielstick engine, the latter two a Wärtsilä. On 13 March 1989 VR confirmed that Pielstick engines would be fitted on all the upcoming locomotives. The Wärtsilä engines were kept on the two prototypes, as refitting them would have been too costly.

=== The main series ===
After an extensive testing programme, the 19 series locomotives were delivered between 1990 and 1992. The manufacturer had anticipated a larger series to be ordered to replace old heavy line diesels (Dr12 and Dr13); however, the rapid progress of the electrification of Finnish main lines decreased the need for new heavy diesel locomotives and thus no further orders materialized. The locomotives were designed and assembled in Finland, either by Valmet Oy at Tampere (numbers 2801–2809) or by Transtech Oy at Otanmäki and Taivalkoski (numbers 2810–2823).

== Technical information ==
Originally the engines were planned to be of Finnish design (Wärtsilä Vaasa 8R22), but after tests with two prototype locos, the engine type was changed into French Pielstick 12PA4-V-200VG. The Pielsticks produced originally 1,660 kilowatts (2,230 hp), but in 1997 they were limited to an output of 1,500 kilowatts (2,000 hp) to increase durability.

The locomotive was very modern at its time and it was among the first to use microprocessor-controlled GTO thyristor inverter-driven three-phase asychronous AC motors. The construction is modular, and data is transmitted via optical fiber cables between modules. The maximum speed is 140 kilometres per hour (87 mph). The maximum frequency of the inverters corresponds to 156 kilometres per hour (97 mph), and the locomotive has reached that in test runs. The locomotive provides 400 kW 1500 V electricity for heating of passenger cars.

== Livery ==
The first two prototypes were painted in a white/red livery to go with VR's recent InterCity brand, showcasing the VR logo next to the cab. The final livery (starting from number 2803) added some grey on the side of the engine covers. Two of the locomotives (numbers 2816 and 2819) have been repainted in a new white/green livery in 2010 and 2011. These have been called Iso Kalpee (Finnish for "Big Pale") by railroad enthusiasts.

== Fleet details ==
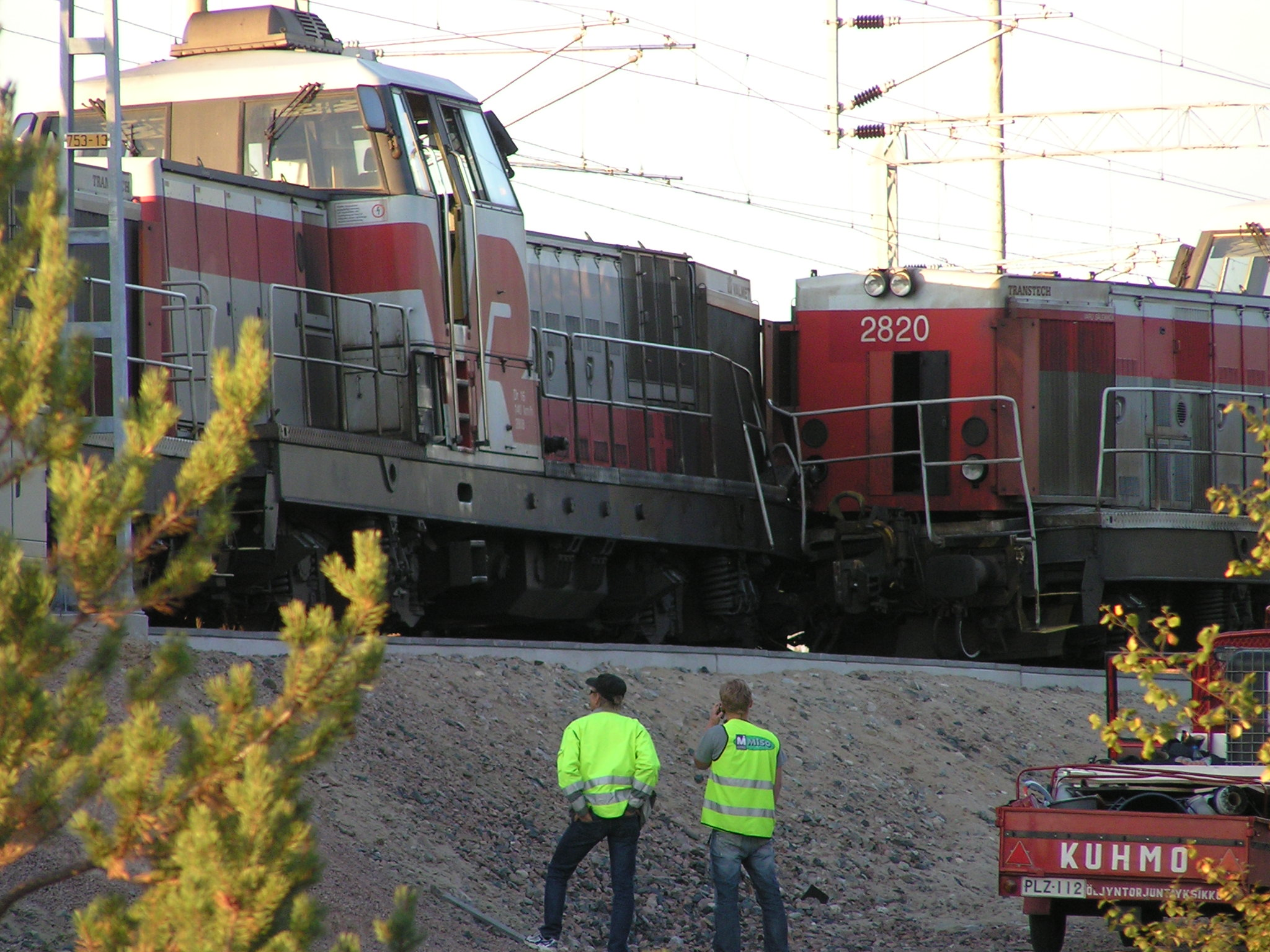
Six locomotives were involved in a shunting accident in Vartius in 2006. All were returned to service.

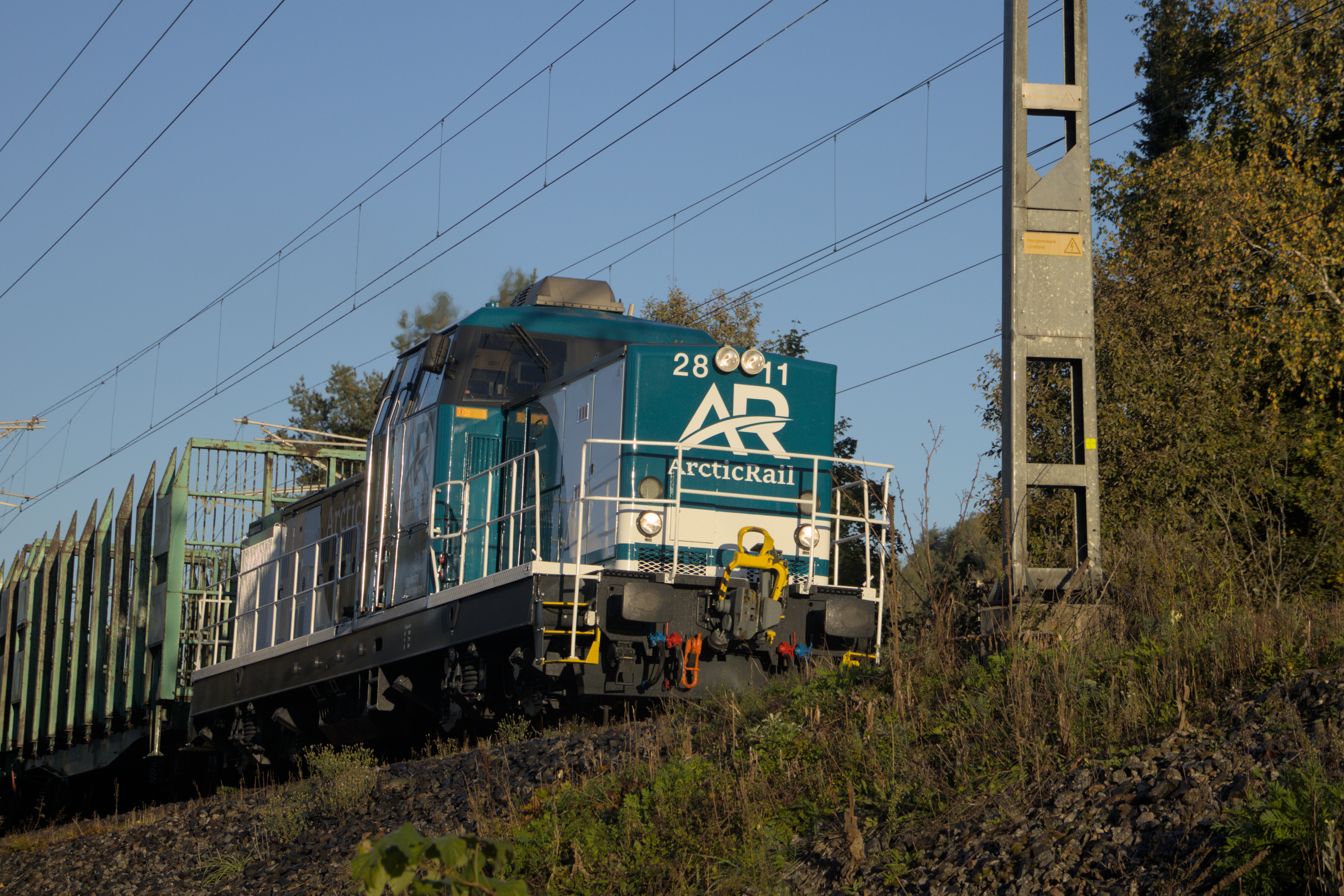
Dr16 in ArcticRail's livery

Of a total of 23 built locomotives, five Dr16:s have been withdrawn from service and/or scrapped. This includes all of the prototype locomotives (numbers 2801–2804), which were withdrawn between 2004 and 2009.

In addition to the prototypes, one series locomotive, number 2814, was scrapped in 2000 after sustaining serious damage in a level crossing accident near the municipality of Ii. After the accident, the obstruction clearing device of the Dr16 was redesigned and strengthened according to the recommendation of the accident investigation board.

Private railway company ArcticRail acquired a single Dr16 locomotive from VR Group in 2024.

Prototype locomotives
	Built	First test runs	Official delivery	Withdrawn and Scrapped	Notes
2801	22 April 1985	25 June 1986	28 June 1989	20 January 2004	Pielstick engine.
2802	16 February 1986	16 March 1987	28 June 1989	July 2009	Pielstick engine. Closest to the series locomotives.
2803	31 October 1986	30 December 1986	28 June 1989	20 January 2004	Wärtsilä engine.
2804	23 January 1987	30 September 1987	28 June 1989	30 November 2004	Wärtsilä engine.

Series locomotives
	Delivered	Withdrawn and Scrapped	Notes
2805	28 December 1990	12 May 2023	Sold to ArcticRail at auction in February 2026
2806	28 December 1990	24 July 2025	
2807	28 December 1990	21 September 2014	
2808	28 December 1990	15 April 2015	
2809	11 February 1991	7 September 2025	
2810	4 March 1991	6 July 2020	
2811	10 April 1991	4 April 2024	Sold to ArcticRail at auction in 2024 not scrapped
2812	20 May 1991	6 February 2023	
2813	25 June 1991	4 April 2024	Sold to ArcticRail at auction in 2025 not scrapped
2814	30 August 1991	20 February 2000	
2815	27 September 1991	7 September 2025	
2816	25 October 1991	7 September 2025	
2817	22 November 1991	7 September 2025	
2818	20 December 1991	7 September 2025	
2819	23 January 1992	March 2026	
2820	21 February 1992	23 February 2018	
2821	26 March 1992	March 2026	
2822	24 April 1992	November 2023	Sold to ArcticRail at auction in February 2026
2823	30 June 1992	November 2023	Sold to ArcticRail at auction in February 2026

Sources: Pentikäinen 2006, pp. 40, 50, 60, 100, 128; Isovaalee.info

== Variants ==
=== Ttm1 ===
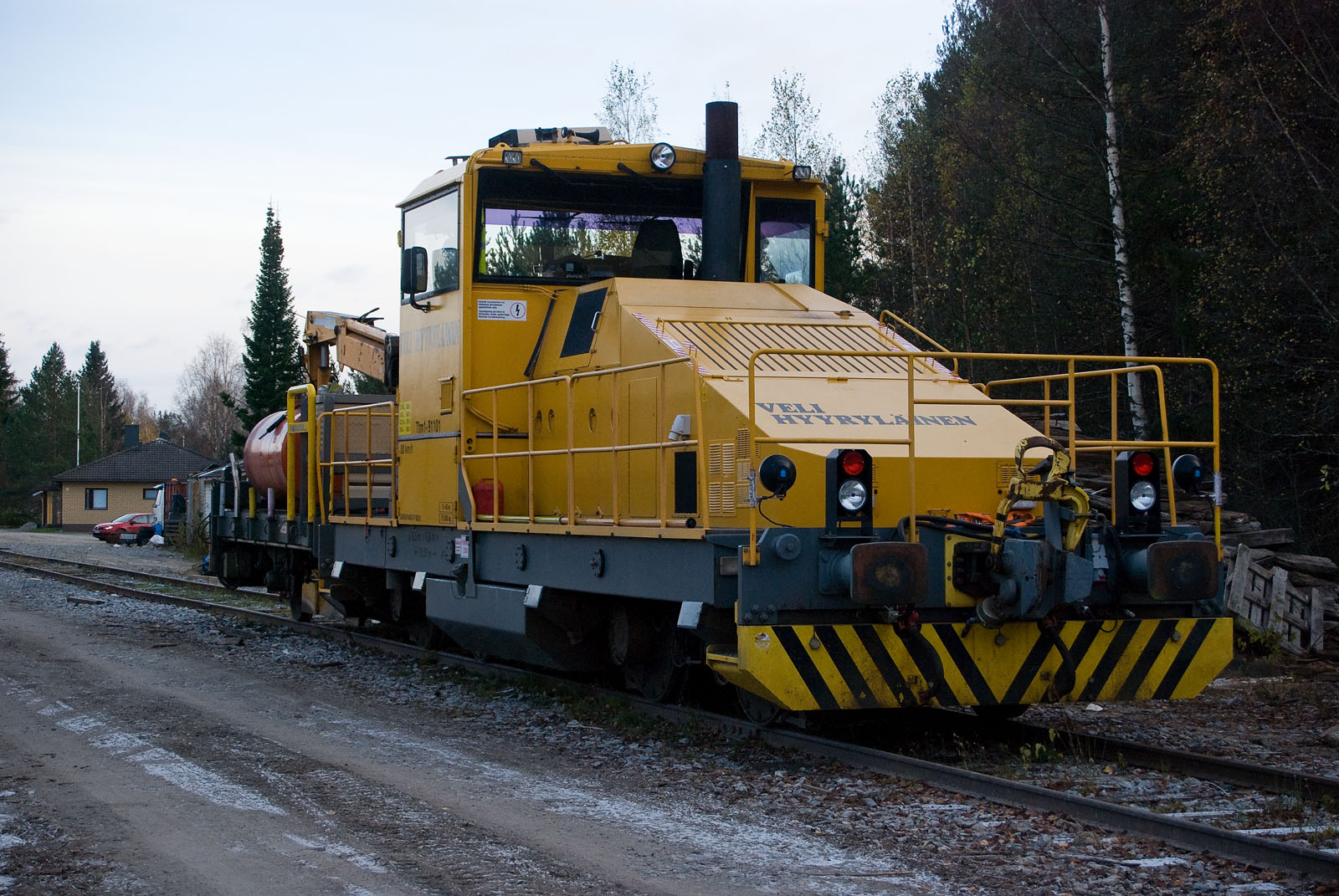
The Ttm1 at Valtimo.

Also known as type N locomotive (Finnish: N-veturi) or Dv13. It is a smaller work locomotive that implements some of the components of the Dr16. The two locomotives share also the same computer system. It is owned nowadays by Maansiirto Veli Hyyryläinen Oy (part of Destia group).

=== Sx prototype ===
Valmet originally prepared the Dr12 to be modified as a full electric locomotive while building it, designing it for speeds up to 180 km/h (110 mph). It was estimated that the electric and diesel variants would share 80% of their parts. However, VR finally ordered the Sr2 locomotives from SLM and ABB.
