= Otanmäki =

Village in Kainuu, Finland

Coordinates: 64°06′35″N 27°06′20″E

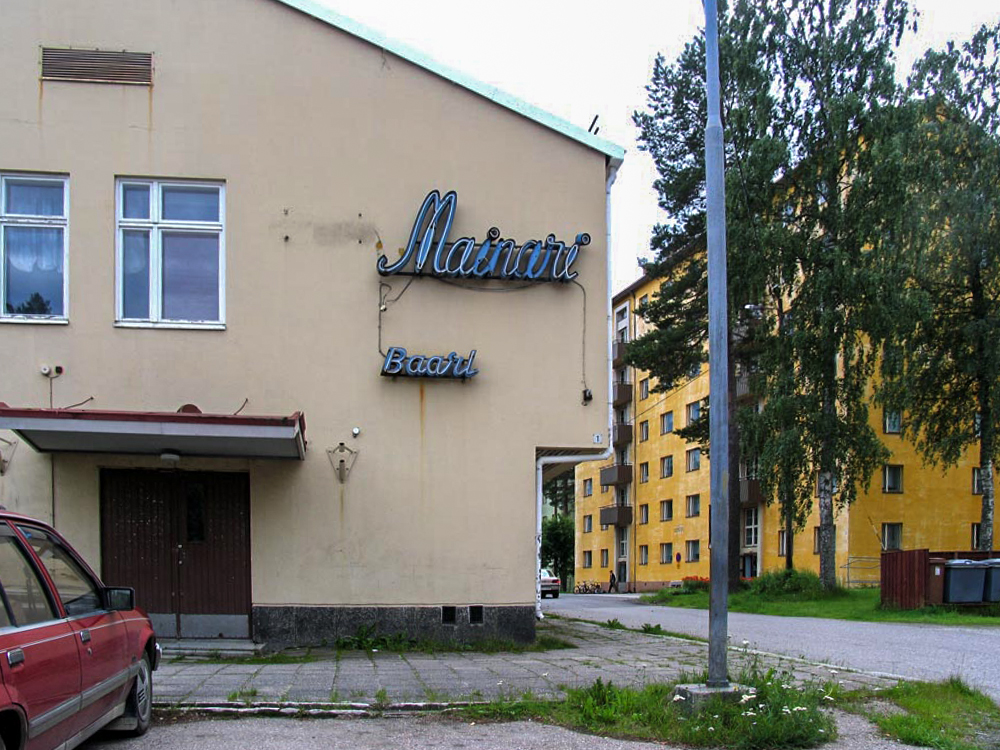
Old bar in Otanmäki village

Otanmäki (Finnish pronunciation: [ˈotɑmˌmæki]) is a village to the south-west of Kajaani, Finland. Otanmäki is located in Vuolijoki within the bounds of the City of Kajaani municipality.

The railway rolling stock manufacturer Škoda Transtech Oy has a factory in Otanmäki, which has produced many of VR's railway carriages.

In the early 1950s, the Canadian actor Donald Sutherland was an exchange student in Finland for four months and he lived in Otanmäki, among other places.

One of Google's upcoming data centers is planned for Otanmäki.
