= Roshchino =

Roshchino (Russian: Рощино) is the name of several inhabited localities in Russia.

== Modern localities ==
Urban localities

- Roshchino, Leningrad Oblast, an urban-type settlement under the administrative jurisdiction of Roshchinskoye Settlement Municipal Formation in Vyborgsky District of Leningrad Oblast

Rural localities

- Roshchino, Amur Oblast, a selo in Razdolnensky Rural Settlement of Tambovsky District in Amur Oblast
- Roshchino, Belgorod Oblast, a settlement in Valuysky District of Belgorod Oblast
- Roshchino, Chelyabinsk Oblast, a settlement in Roshchinsky Selsoviet of Sosnovsky District in Chelyabinsk Oblast
- Roshchino, Guryevsky District, a settlement in Lugovskoy Rural Okrug of Guryevsky District in Kaliningrad Oblast
- Roshchino, Gvardeysky District, a settlement in Slavinsky Rural Okrug of Gvardeysky District in Kaliningrad Oblast
- Roshchino, Pravdinsky District, a settlement in Domnovsky Rural Okrug of Pravdinsky District in Kaliningrad Oblast
- Roshchino, Zelenogradsky District, a settlement in Kovrovsky Rural Okrug of Zelenogradsky District in Kaliningrad Oblast
- Roshchino, Khabarovsk Krai, a selo in Khabarovsky District of Khabarovsk Krai
- Roshchino, Dalmatovsky District, Kurgan Oblast, a village under the administrative jurisdiction of Dalmatovo Town Under District Jurisdiction in Dalmatovsky District of Kurgan Oblast
- Roshchino, Kargapolsky District, Kurgan Oblast, a village in Chashinsky Selsoviet of Kargapolsky District in Kurgan Oblast
- Roshchino, Republic of Mordovia, a selo in Starokovylyaysky Selsoviet of Temnikovsky District in the Republic of Mordovia
- Roshchino, Staraya Russa, Novgorod Oblast, a village under the administrative jurisdiction of the town of oblast significance of Staraya Russa in Novgorod Oblast
- Roshchino, Valdaysky District, Novgorod Oblast, a settlement in Roshchinskoye Settlement of Valdaysky District in Novgorod Oblast
- Roshchino, Omsk Oblast, a selo in Roshchinsky Rural Okrug of Gorkovsky District in Omsk Oblast
- Roshchino, Orenburg Oblast, a settlement in Rodinsky Selsoviet of Sorochinsky District in Orenburg Oblast
- Roshchino, Penza Oblast, a selo in Roshchinsky Selsoviet of Serdobsky District in Penza Oblast
- Roshchino, Primorsky Krai, a selo in Krasnoarmeysky District of Primorsky Krai
- Roshchino, Sakhalin Oblast, a selo in Smirnykhovsky District of Sakhalin Oblast
- Roshchino, Saratov Oblast, a selo in Volsky District of Saratov Oblast
- Roshchino, Stavropol Krai, a settlement in Roshchinsky Selsoviet of Kursky District in Stavropol Krai
- Roshchino, Tver Oblast, a village in Bokhtovskoye Rural Settlement of Lesnoy District in Tver Oblast
- Roshchino, Ulyanovsk Oblast, a settlement in Bezvodovsky Rural Okrug of Kuzovatovsky District in Ulyanovsk Oblast
- Roshchino, Vladimir Oblast, a village in Petushinsky District of Vladimir Oblast
- Roshchino, Belozersky District, Vologda Oblast, a village in Gulinsky Selsoviet of Belozersky District in Vologda Oblast
- Roshchino, Cherepovetsky District, Vologda Oblast, a khutor in Sudsky Selsoviet of Cherepovetsky District in Vologda Oblast
- Roshchino, Yaroslavl Oblast, a settlement in Slobodskoy Rural Okrug of Danilovsky District in Yaroslavl Oblast

== Abolished localities ==
- Roshchino, Tyumen Oblast, a settlement under the administrative jurisdiction of Kalininsky Administrative Okrug of the City of Tyumen in Tyumen Oblast; abolished in December 2013

== See also ==
- Roshchin
