= Okeroinen railway station =

Closed railway station in Lahti, Finland

Okeroinen

General information
- Location: Finland
- Coordinates: 60°57′51″N 25°34′18″E
- System: Closed VR station
- Line: Riihimäki–Lahti
- Platforms: 2 side platforms

Other information
- Station code: Okr
- Classification: Halt

History
- Opened: 1 February 1904
- Closed: 31 May 1992
Location

The Okeroinen railway station (Finnish: Okeroisten rautatieasema, Swedish: Okeroinen järnvägsstation) was located in Lahti, Finland, in the village and district of Okeroinen. It was located along the Riihimäki–Lahti line, and its neighboring stations were Herrala in the west and Lahti in the east.

== History ==
Due to the epidemics that ravaged the workforce of the Riihimäki–Saint Petersburg railway throughout the 1860s, a field hospital was established in the village of Okeroinen, in the parish of Hollola, in April 1868. This was prompted by the hospital in Järvenpää running out of capacity; the Okeroinen hospital was closed in October.

After the railway was opened for traffic, the locals of Okeroinen appealed to the Railway Administration about the establishment of a station in the village in 1870 and 1893 without result; however, the establishment of a laiturivaihde - a halt with sidings - was finally decided on in 1903, after the municipality of Hollola committed to covering the costs. Services began on 1 February 1904; passengers were served by local trains 127 and 128 stopping on request. A small cabin was built to serve as the station building. In the interwar period, industry began to prop up in the surroundings of the station, and in 1935, a larger station building was constructed out of leftover materials from the dismantling of the second Lahti railway station.

In the post-war period, Okeroinen briefly held the higher status of a pysäkki (a station of lower significance, translating to "stop"), but it was demoted to an unstaffed laiturivaihde in 1967. Freight services at the station ceased in 1968, after which it was demoted to a halt. The station building was dismantled in 1971; its construction materials were once again reused, this time as a recreational home in Nastola. On 31 May 1992, passenger services were ceased.
