= Herrala railway station =

Railway station in Finland

Herrala
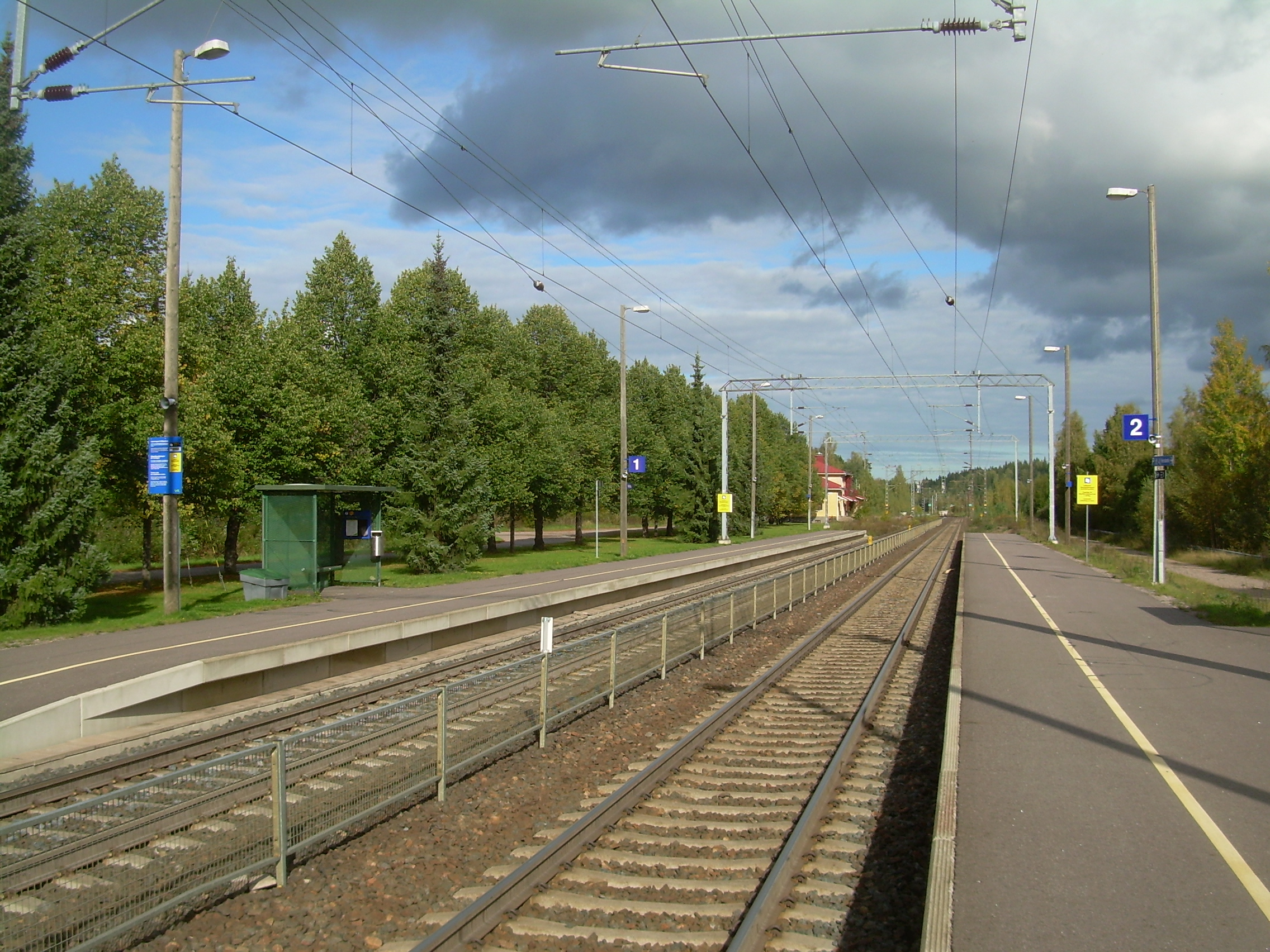

General information
- Location: Ratatie 33, 16500; Herrala, Hollola; Finland
- Coordinates: 60°53′45″N 025°28′22″E
- System: VR station
- Owner: Finnish Transport Infrastructure Agency
- Operator: VR Group
- Line: Riihimäki–Lahti railway
- Platforms: 2 side platforms
- Tracks: 2

Other information
- Station code: Hr
- Classification: Halt

History
- Opened: 1 November 1869; 156 years ago

Passengers
- 2008: 2,000

Services
Preceding station	VR commuter rail	Following station
Järvelä towards Riihimäki	G	Lahti Terminus
Route map
Location

The Herrala railway station (Finnish: Herralan rautatieasema, Swedish: Herrala järnvägsstation) is located in Hollola, Finland, in the village and urban area of Herrala. It is located along the Riihimäki–Lahti line, and its neighboring stations are Järvelä in the west and Lahti in the east.

== History ==
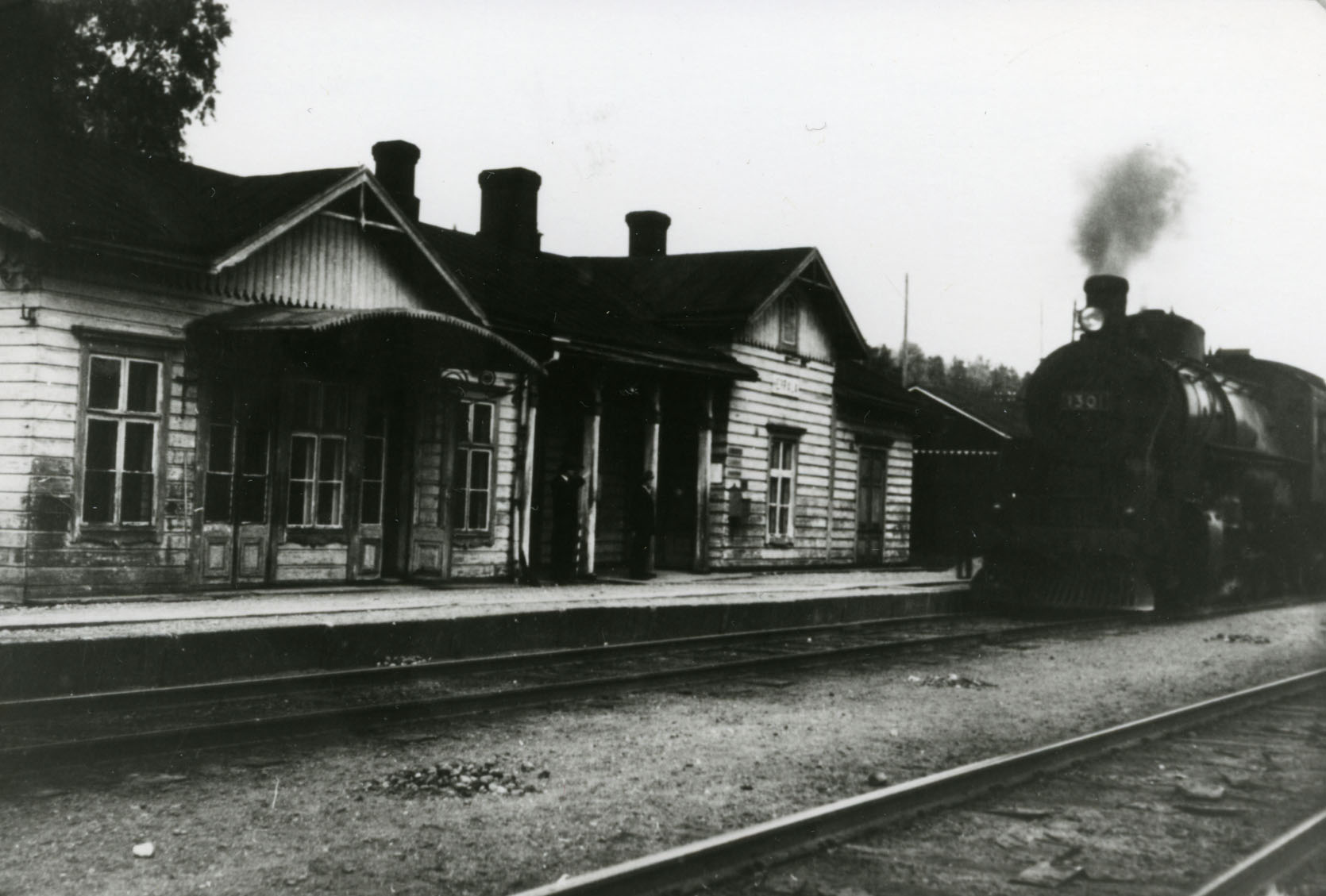
A Tr2-pulled train in Herrala in 1946-1953

Herrala is one of the original intermediate stations of the Riihimäki–Saint Petersburg railway, and was opened for passenger traffic in November 1869. The station was placed in the crossroads between the railway and the road from Hollola to Mäntsälä and Orimattila. The station played a role in the development of Herrala, and the village became home to various industries, including three brick factories, the last of which closed down in 1976. A sawmill was also founded; its activities ceased following a destructive fire in May 2017.

Sometime in the 1970-80s, the main road of the village (currently named Herralantie and designated as regional road 2954) was realigned and its level crossing was replaced with an underpass. In 2005, its platforms were rebuilt and moved closer towards Riihimäki, which made it possible to replace the former cross-platform pedestrian level crossing with the Herralantie underpass.

Herrala has slowly lost its significance as an urban center, partly due to the development in the municipality of Hollola being focused in the seat of Salpakangas. Freight transport at the station was ceased in 1990 and its railyard was disassembled in 1997, making it a halt.

== Architecture ==
The original station building in Herrala was built according to stock plans for class IV stations on the Riihimäki–St. Petersburg line, designed by Knut Nylander. (Note: The other stations constructed as such on the line, listed in order from Riihimäki to St. Petersburg–Finlyandsky, include Hikiä, Lappila, Vesijärvi, Kausala, Kymi (Koria), Taavetti, Säiniö (Verkhne-Cherkasovo), Galitzina (Leypyasuo) and Terijoki (Zelenogorsk).) The station was expanded first in 1880, and again in 1897 with an additional western wing designed by Bruno Granholm. As per a railyard diagram dating to 1873, the premises of the station also included a warehouse, a roundhouse at the northern end of the railyard, two workshops and a workers' residence, among other miscellaneous buildings, all of which have been demolished since.

The first station building was demolished and replaced with a new one in 1953. The second station was built approximately 200 metres (660 ft) to the east of the first, and is distinctive in that while most of the stations of the era were built out of wood and with simple architectural principles, Herrala was given an elaborate centrally heated two-level brick building. An electrically controlled signal box was constructed into the station building in 1995.

== Services ==
Herrala is an intermediate station on commuter rail line G on the route Riihimäki–Lahti. Westbound trains towards Riihimäki stop at track 1 and eastbound ones towards Lahti use track 2. Prior to the opening of the Kerava-Lahti railway line, Herrala was also served by the unnamed regional trains on the route Helsinki–Riihimäki–Lahti–Kouvola–Kotka Harbour.
