= Hikiä railway station =

Railway station in Finland

Hikiä
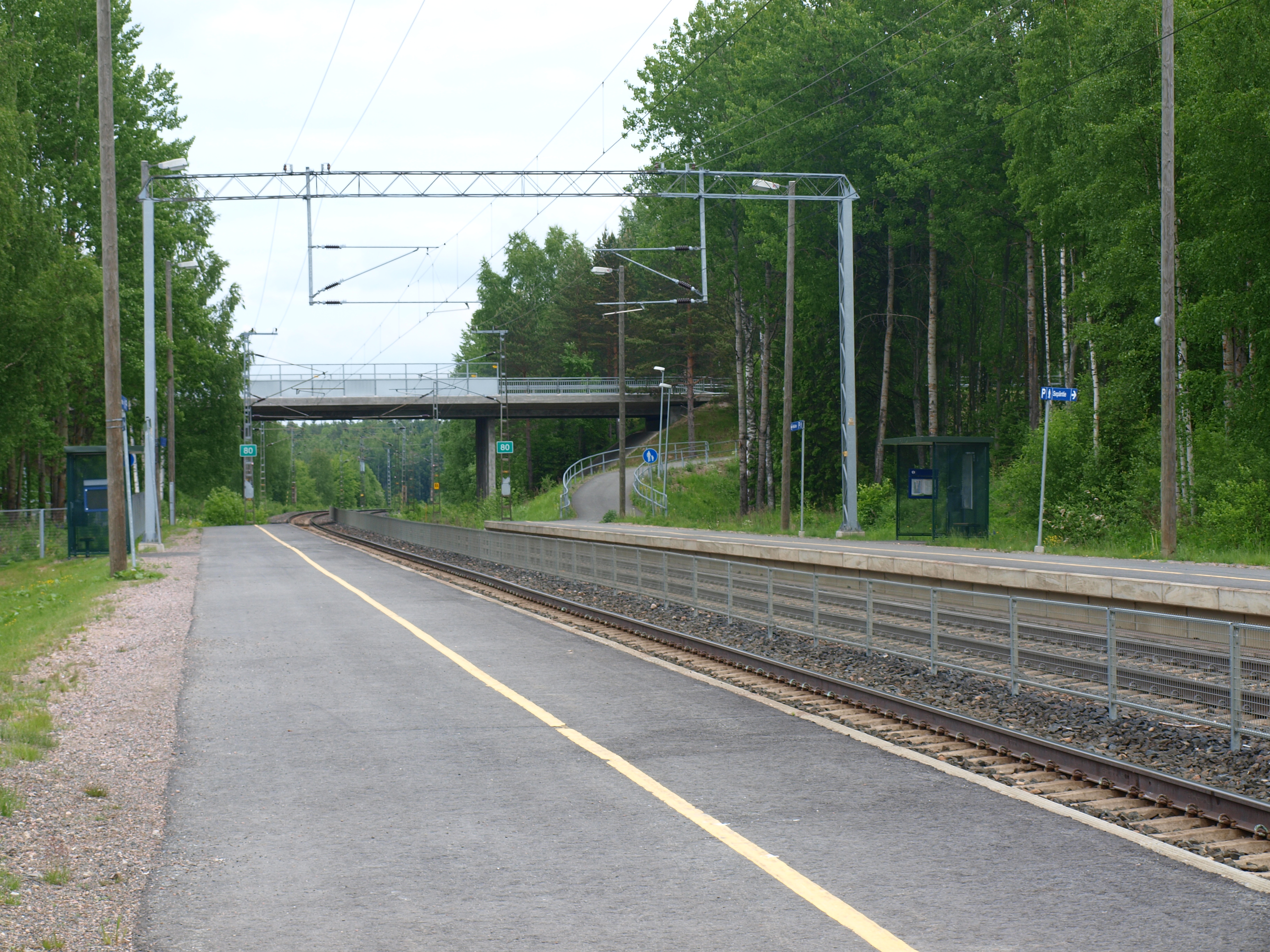

General information
- Location: Sepäntie, 12240; Hikiä, Hausjärvi; Finland
- Coordinates: 60°45′13″N 024°55′23″E
- System: VR station
- Owner: Finnish Transport Infrastructure Agency
- Operator: VR Group
- Line: Riihimäki–Lahti railway
- Platforms: 2 side platforms
- Tracks: 2

Construction
- Architect: Knut Nylander

Other information
- Station code: Hk
- Classification: Halt

History
- Opened: 1 November 1869; 156 years ago

Passengers
- 2008: 5,000

Services
| Preceding station | VR commuter rail | Following station |
|---|---|---|
| Riihimäki Terminus | G | Oitti towards Lahti |
Route map
Location

The Hikiä railway station (Finnish: Hikiän rautatieasema, Swedish: Hikiä järnvägsstation) is located in Hausjärvi, Finland, in the village and urban area of Hikiä. It is located along the Riihimäki–Lahti line, and its neighboring stations are Riihimäki in the west and Oitti in the east.

== History ==
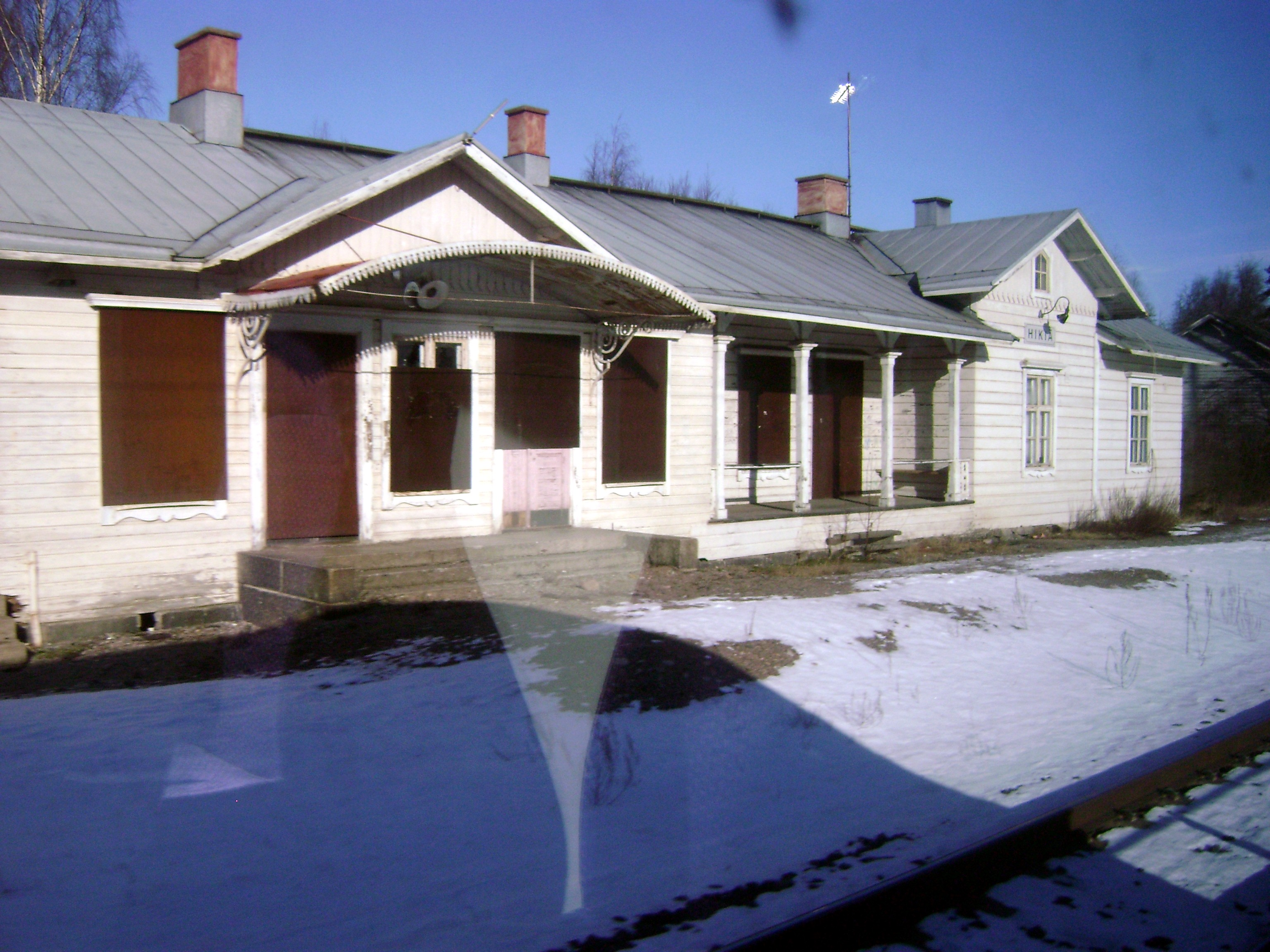
The Hikiä station building in 2008

Hikiä is one of the original intermediate stations of the Riihimäki–Saint Petersburg railway, and was opened for passenger traffic in November 1869. It was placed on the crossing between the railway and the road between Nurmijärvi and the church of Hausjärvi. The railway played a significant role in the development of Hikiä, helping it overtake the Hausjärvi church village in population. In 1960 Hikiä had 700 inhabitants, compared to 200 of the Hausjärvi church village. Hikiä's population in 2018 was 1,068.

Hikiä became an unstaffed station in 1976 and its freight traffic was abolished in 1991. In 2005, its platforms were rebuilt and moved approximately 100 metres (330 ft) to the east towards Lahti, which made it possible to replace the former cross-platform pedestrian level crossing with the overpass on regional road 290.

== Architecture ==
The station building in Hikiä was built according to stock plans for class IV stations on the Riihimäki–St. Petersburg line, designed by Knut Nylander. (Note: The other stations constructed as such on the line, listed in order from Riihimäki to St. Petersburg–Finlyandsky, include Lappila, Herrala, Vesijärvi, Kausala, Kymi (Koria), Taavetti, Säiniö (Verkhne-Cherkasovo), Galitzina (Leypyasuo) and Terijoki (Zelenogorsk).) Construction was completed in 1869, and the building was later expanded in two phases in 1883 and 1904, using the same plans drawn by Bruno Granholm for the extensions of the Lappila station in 1876 and 1900. As per a railyard diagram dating to 1873, the Hikiä station at the time also included a warehouse and a water tower at the end of a siding stretching from the far eastern end from the railyard, as well as two additional sidings to its south.

The Hikiä station and its related buildings were transferred into the possession of Senate Properties in 2007.

== Services ==
Hikiä is an intermediate station on VR commuter rail line G on the route Riihimäki–Lahti. Westbound trains towards Riihimäki stop at track 1 and eastbound ones towards Lahti use track 2. Prior to the opening of the Kerava-Lahti railway line, Hikiä was also served by the unnamed regional trains on the route Helsinki–Riihimäki–Lahti–Kouvola–Kotka Harbour.

A VR ticket vending machine, as well as 55 centimetres (22 in) high platforms enabling accessible entry to low-floor trains, are present at the station.
