= Lappila railway station =

Railway station in Finland

Lappila
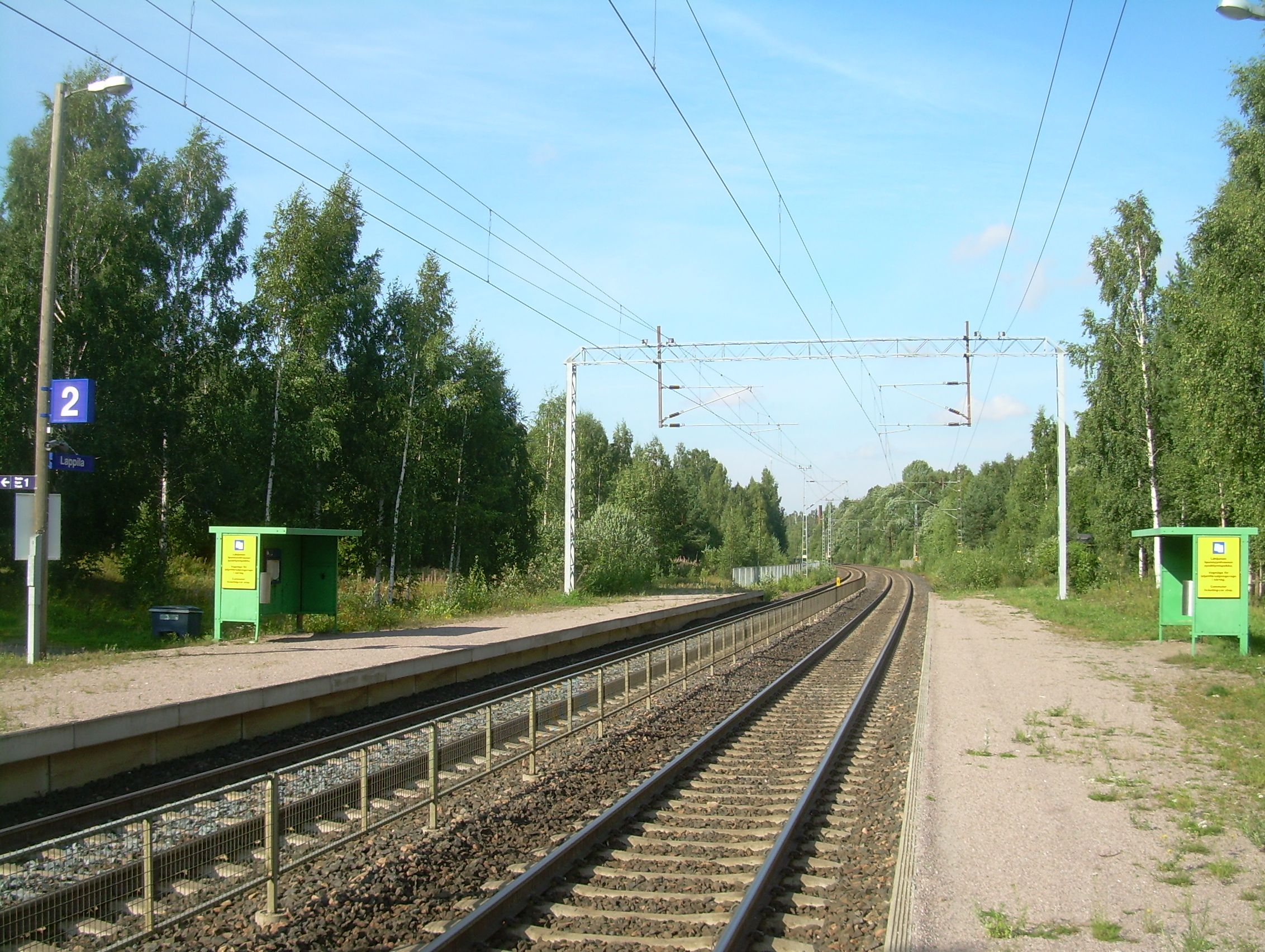

General information
- Location: Lappilanraitti 3, 16670; Lappila, Kärkölä; Finland
- Coordinates: 60°50′56″N 025°10′26″E
- System: VR station
- Owner: Finnish Transport Infrastructure Agency
- Operator: VR Group
- Line: Riihimäki–Lahti railway
- Platforms: 2 side platforms
- Tracks: 2

Other information
- Station code: Laa
- Classification: Halt

History
- Opened: 1 November 1869; 156 years ago

Passengers
- 2008: 2,000

Services
Preceding station	VR commuter rail	Following station
Mommila towards Riihimäki	G	Järvelä towards Lahti
Route map
Location

The Lappila railway station (Finnish: Lappilan rautatieasema, Swedish: Lappila järnvägsstation) is located in Kärkölä, Finland, in the village and urban area of Lappila. It is located along the Riihimäki–Lahti line, and its neighboring stations are Mommila in the west and Järvelä in the east.

== History ==
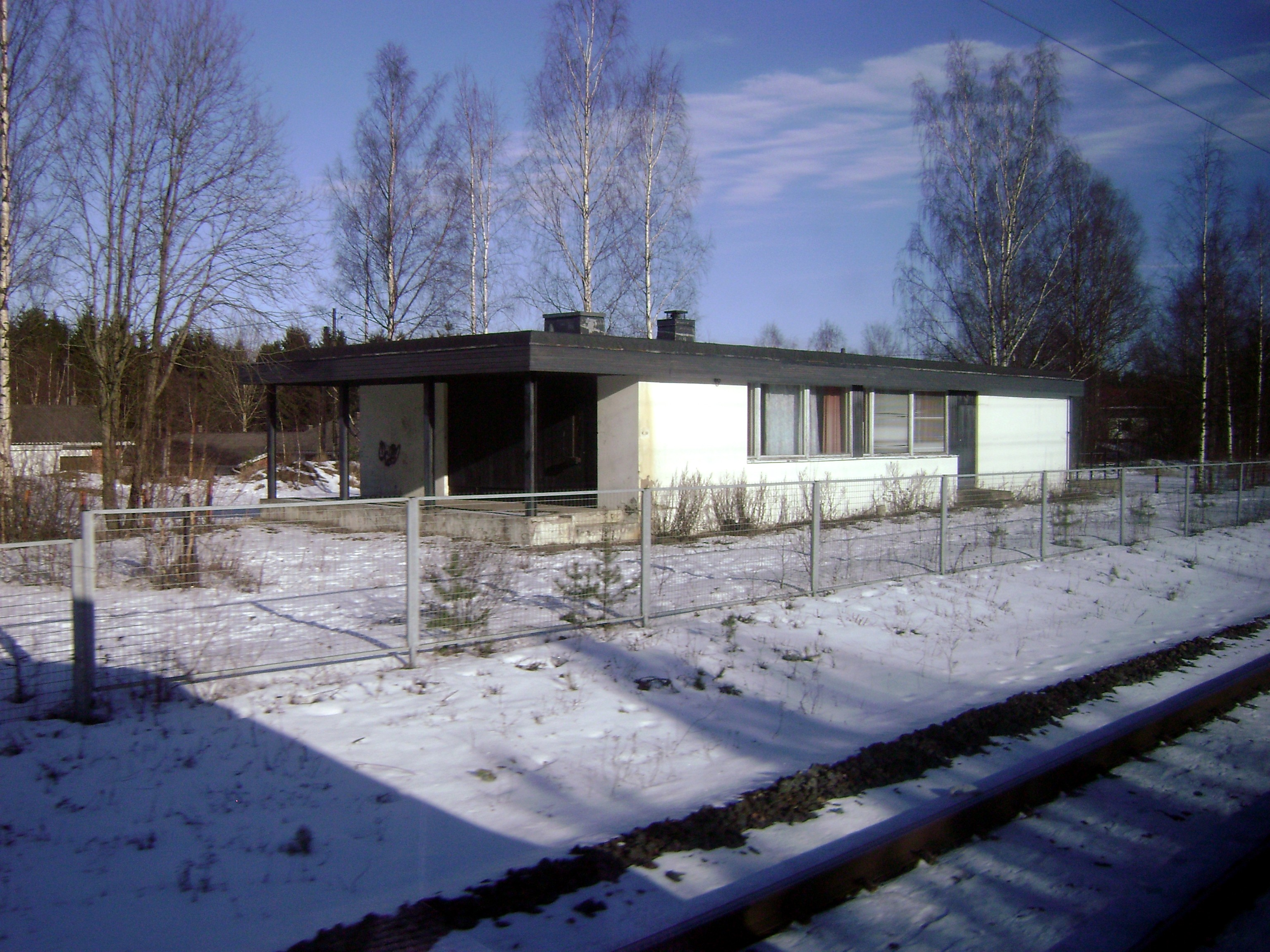
The latter station building in Lappila

When work on the Riihimäki–Saint Petersburg railway began in 1868, Lappila was one of the headquarters for workers along with Riihimäki. The nearby village of Tillola became site for the third field hospital founded for the railway workforce, after those in Oitti and Lahti. Industry began to settle in Lappila after the arrival of the railway; facilities founded include two sawmills (1897, 1908) as well as brick factories and a furniture workshop. After the last sawmill closed in 1959, Lappila's population number took a downturn after peaking in 1960 at over 700. Lappila was home to 283 inhabitants in 2018.

On 18 October 1961, the Railway Administration made the decision to purchase a set of 800 concrete sleepers from abroad, the first of their kind in Finland; in July 1962, they were installed on the section of track between Lappila and Järvelä. The trials were successful, and on 12 June 1963, the first batch of concrete sleepers from Finnish manufacturers was ordered.

Lappila became an unstaffed station in 1976, its freight traffic services were discontinued in 1981, and its railyard was dismantled in 1987, making it a halt. The Jutila crossover, located approximately 3 kilometres (1.9 mi) to the west from Lappila, was opened on 1 July 1997.

== Architecture ==
The original station building in Lappila was built according to stock plans for class IV stations on the Riihimäki–St. Petersburg line, designed by Knut Nylander. (Note: The other stations constructed as such on the line, listed in order from Riihimäki to St. Petersburg–Finlyandsky, include Hikiä, Herrala, Vesijärvi, Kausala, Kymi (Koria), Taavetti, Säiniö (Verkhne-Cherkasovo), Galitzina (Leypyasuo) and Terijoki (Zelenogorsk).) Construction was completed in 1869; it was later expanded in two phases in 1876 and 1900, with both extensions being designed by Bruno Granholm; the plans were also used for the expansions of the Hikiä station in 1883 and 1904. As per a railyard diagram dating to 1873, the Lappila station at the time also included a warehouse right next to the station building, as well as a roundhouse at the western end of the railyard.

The original station building was dismantled and replaced by a smaller barracks-style building in 1967. The station building was transferred to the ownership of Senate Properties in 2007.

== Services ==
Lappila is an intermediate station on commuter rail line G on the route Riihimäki–Lahti. Westbound trains towards Riihimäki use track 1 and eastbound ones towards Lahti use track 2. Prior to the opening of the Kerava-Lahti railway line, Lappila was also served by the unnamed regional trains on the route Helsinki–Riihimäki–Lahti–Kouvola–Kotka Harbour.
