= Pirunpesä (Hollola) =

Canyon in Hollola, Finland

Pirunpesä (Devil's Nest)
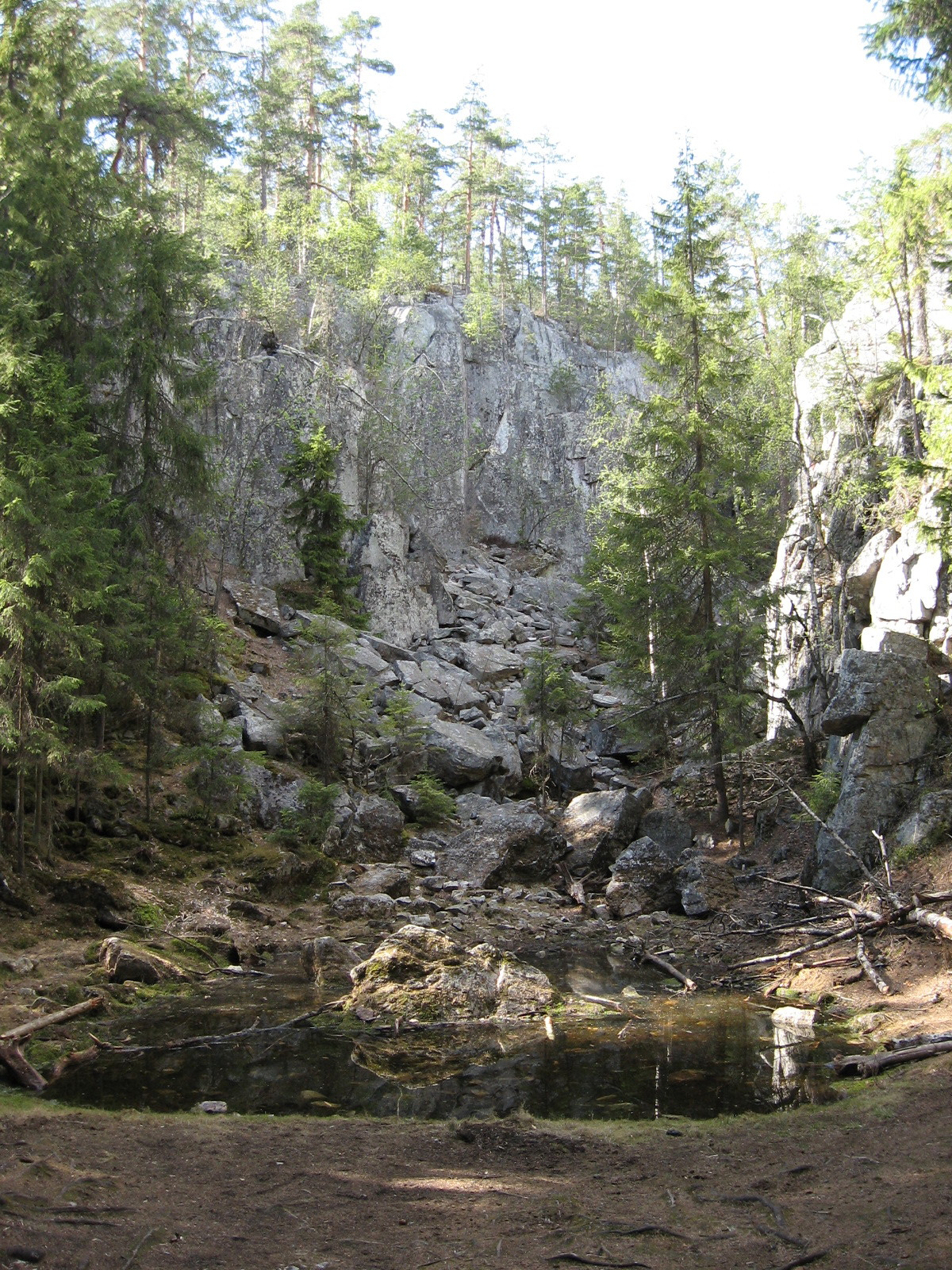
- Pirunpesä rock cleft

- Location within Finland
- Location: Hollola, Finland
- Nearest city: Hollola
- Coordinates: 61°00′N 25°32′E
- Website: www.lahdenseudunluonto.fi/pirunpesa/

Pirunpesä (literally "Devil's Nest") is a canyon in Hollola, Finland. The canyon is located in the Tiirismaa nature reserve, to east of the Tiirismaa television and radio mast. The area of Pirunpesä is 34 hectares. It was protected in 1950s.

The Tiirismaa bedrock is quartzite and the near the nest many quartzite boulders can be found.

Pirunpesä has been a visitor attraction since the 1800s. A hiking trail, which is 4.5 kilometres long, passes by Pirunpesä. The trail starts from the Arvi Hauvonen Road and leads towards the Tiirismaa radio mast. There is map and a parking spot near the starting point.
