= Roshchino, Chelyabinsk Oblast =

Roshchino Рощино
- Rural locality
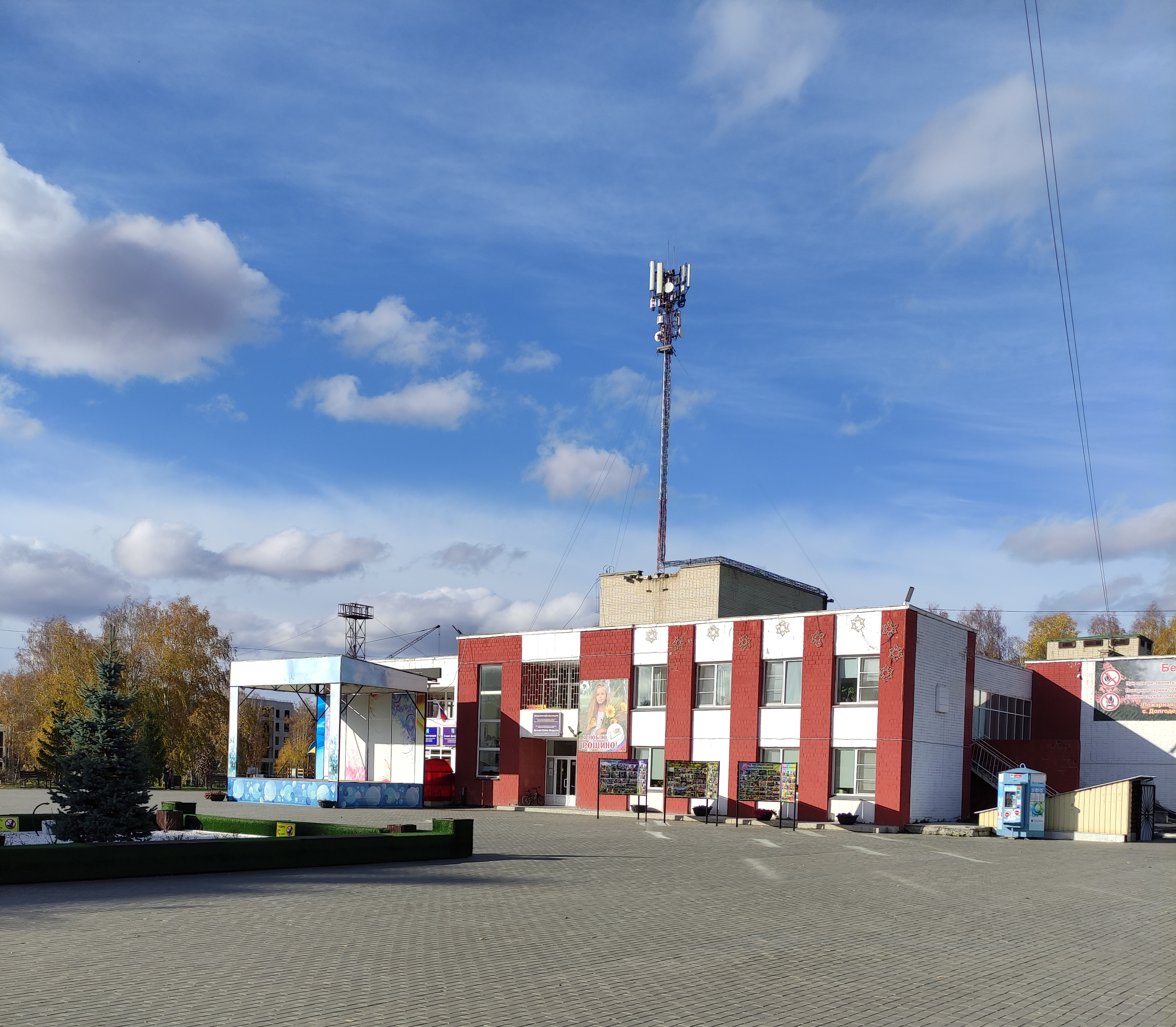
- View of Roshchino village

- Location within Chelyabinsk Oblast Location within Russia
- Coordinates: 55°18′37″N 61°15′45″E
- Country: Russia
- Federal subject: Chelyabinsk Oblast
- Administrative district: Sosnovsky District
- Founded: 1982

Population (2021)
  - Total: 7,394
- Postal code: 456513
- Area code: +7 3514
- Website: http://roshinskoe.eps74.ru

Roshchino (Russian: Рощино) is a rural locality (a settlement) in Sosnovsky District of Chelyabinsk Oblast, Russia. As of the 2021 Census, its population was 7,394.

== Geography ==
Roshchino is located 19 kilometers northwest of Chelyabinsk, the administrative center of the oblast. The settlement consists of three distinct areas:

- Central part with apartment buildings
- Svetly district (established in 1989)
- Low-rise residential area

Nearby settlements include Dolgoderevenskoye, Uzhovka, Esaulka, and Klyuchyovka.

== Economy ==
The local economy is dominated by two major food production facilities:

- Makfa (PJSC) - Russia's largest pasta producer
- Ravis - Sosnovsk Poultry Farm (LLC), the settlement's main employer

== Infrastructure ==
Key infrastructure includes:

- Public education facilities
- Healthcare center
- Road connections to Chelyabinsk

== Demographics ==
Population trends
Year	Population	Source
2010	5,710	
2021	7,394	
