= Riihimäki–Saint Petersburg railway =

Railway line in Finland and Russia

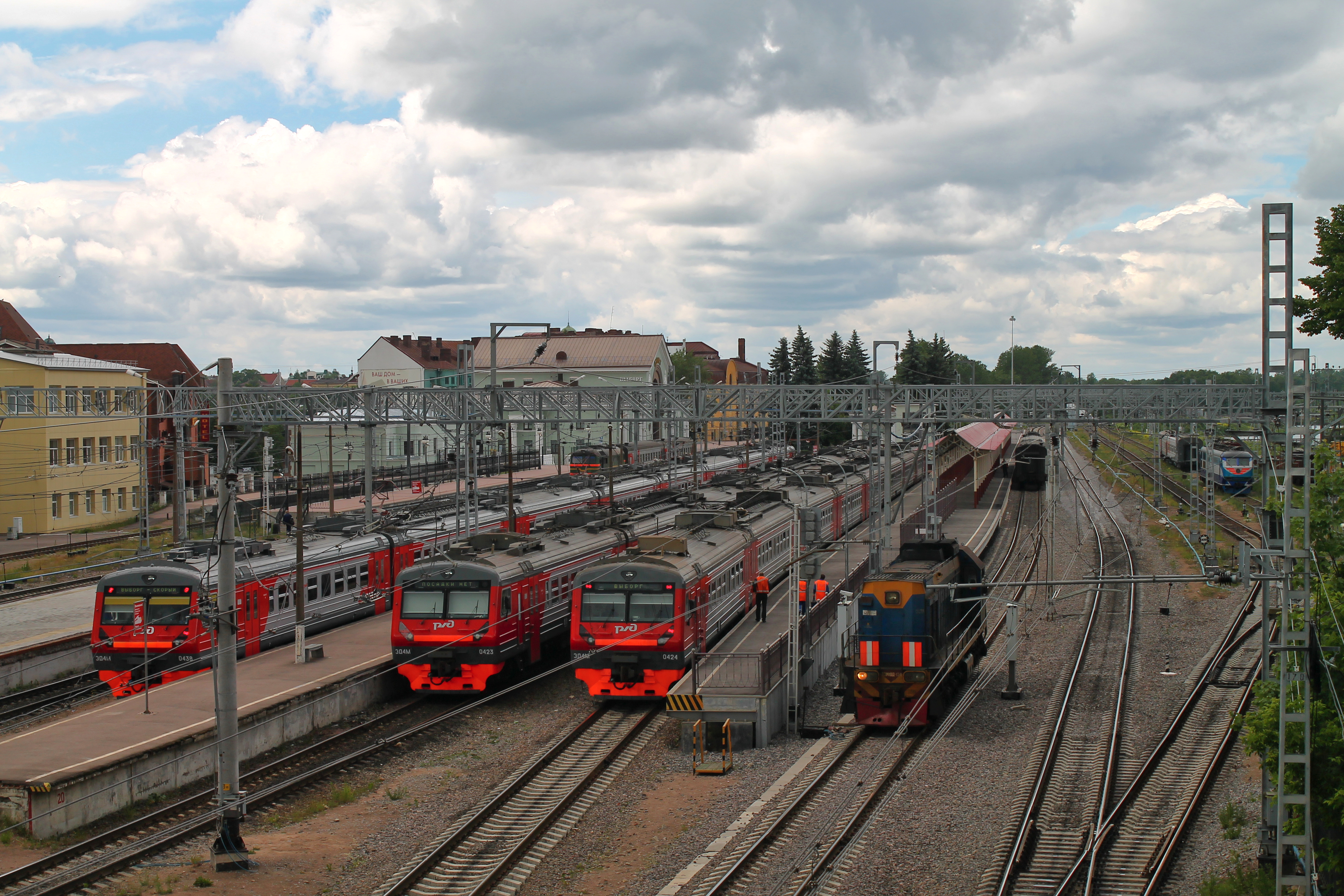
- Suburban trains at the Vyborg railway station, one of the most important stations on the Riihimäki–Saint Petersburg railway.

Overview
- Status: No direct trains between Russia and Finland since 2022
- Locale: Northern and Eastern Europe
- Termini: Riihimäki; Saint Petersburg
- Stations: 57

Service
- Type: High-speed rail; Inter-city rail; Commuter rail; Freight rail
- System: October Railway (Saint Petersburg–Buslovskaya); VR Group (Vainikkala–Riihimäki)
- Operators: Russian Railways; VR Group

History
- Work began: 1867–1913
- Completed: 14 October 1913

Technical
- Line length: 385 km (239 mi)
- Number of tracks: 2
- Character: International rail link
- Track gauge: 1,520 mm (4 ft 11 27/32 in) Russian gauge
- Electrification: 25 kV 50 Hz AC (Finland); 3 kV DC (Russia)

The Riihimäki–Saint Petersburg railway is a 385-kilometre (239 mi) long segment of the Helsinki–Saint Petersburg connection, which is divided between Saint Petersburg and Leningrad Oblast in Russia and the province of Southern Finland in Finland.

== History ==
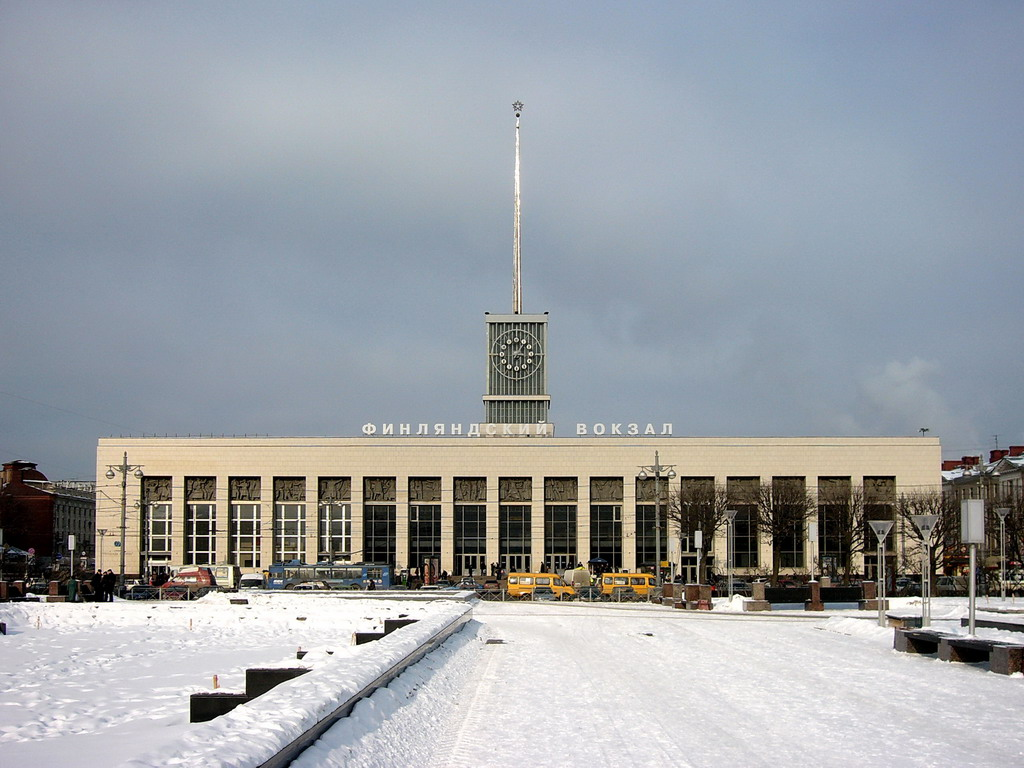
Modern building of the Finlyandsky Rail Terminal, the eastern terminus of the line

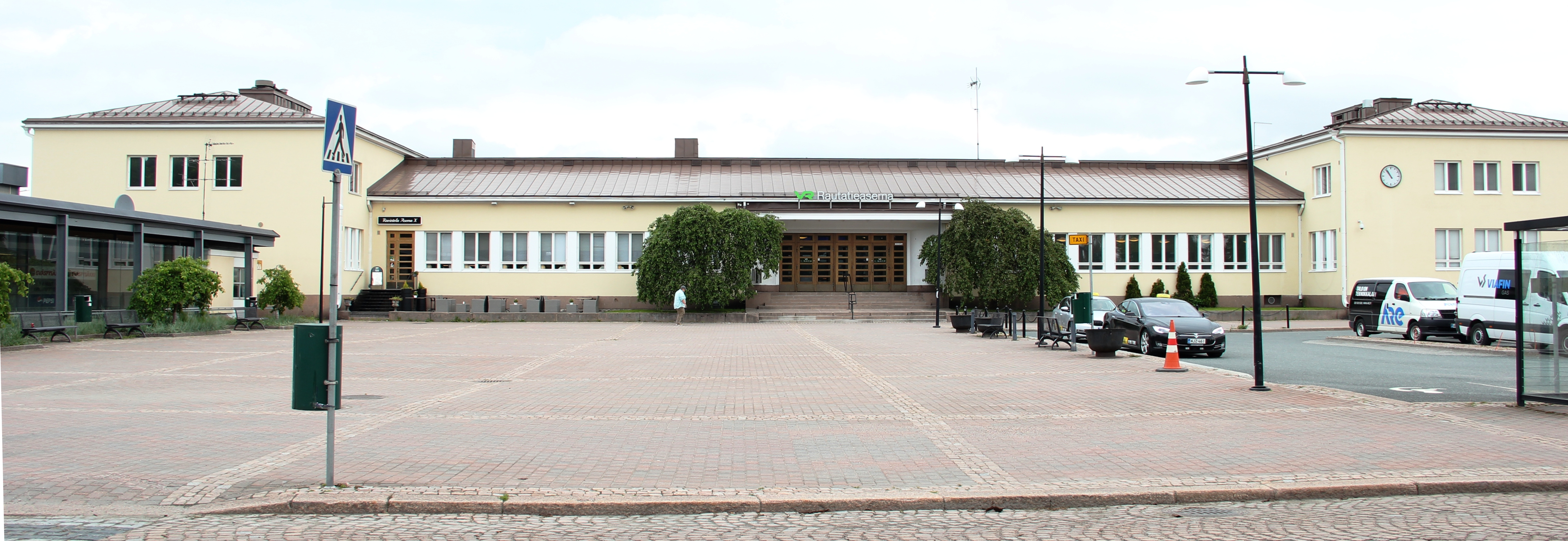
Riihimäki railway station, the western terminus of the line

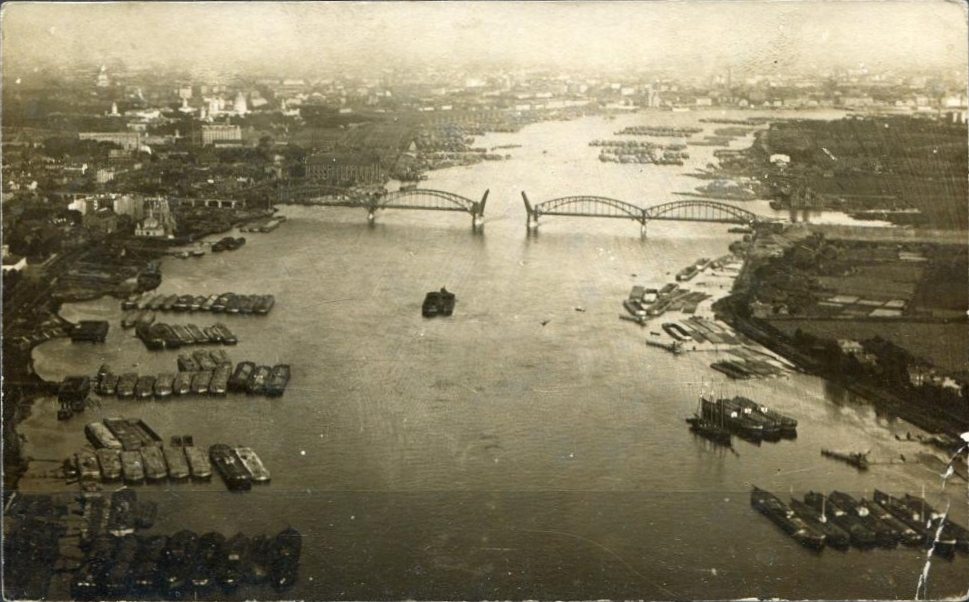
Original Finland Railway Bridge, built in 1910–1912

It was constructed in 1867–70 (starting from both ends), entirely by the government of the autonomous Grand Duchy of Finland that was controlled by the Russian Empire, although the short section between Saint Petersburg and Beloostrov (where Russian customs was situated in 1870–1939) was laid in Russia (Saint Petersburg Governorate). The Finlyandsky Rail Terminal was opened in Saint Petersburg in 1870 in order to serve this line. The rail link starts at the Riihimäki railway station of the Helsinki–Hämeenlinna connection, heading towards the Finlyandsky Railway Terminal of Saint Petersburg through Lahti railway station, Kouvola railway station, Vyborg railway station (formerly Viipuri/Viborg/Wiborg) and Zelenogorsk (formerly Terijoki).

It wasn't until 1913 when the line became connected to the Russian railways as the Finland Railway Bridge across the River Neva in Saint Petersburg was opened.

Until 1917, when Finland became a fully independent state, the railroad had been operated by the Finnish State Railways for all its length, including that section mentioned before. Due to the construction of the southern sections of the railroad, the western part of the Karelian Isthmus on both sides of the Russian-Finnish border became a popular dacha resort place among wealthy St. Petersburgers in the late nineteenth century.

After the Winter War (1939–40) and Continuation War (1941–44), concluded with the Moscow Peace Treaty, Moscow Armistice and Paris Peace Treaty, the Karelian Isthmus with the eastern part of the railroad (from Louko (Pogranitshnoye) to Rajajoki (western part of Sestroretsk)) was ceded by Finland to the Soviet Union. The railway stations Louko (Pogranitshnoye) and Rajajoki were abandoned by Russians.

In 2006, the high-speed railway from Lahti to Kerava was opened, and that cut half an hour off the travel time from Helsinki. In 2010, the speed was raised to 200 km/h most of the distance Lahti–St Petersburg. The freight traffic will be later moved to another upgraded railway, Saint Petersburg–Hiitola railroad. This and the introduction of high-speed trains of type Sm6 cut the travel time by two hours to about 3:30. The railway upgrade cost in Finland was €244M, with an EU contribution of €23M.

The international high-speed train Allegro (Karelian Trains, Helsinki–St. Petersburg) and the sleeper train Tolstoy (Russian Railways, Moscow–St. Petersburg–Helsinki) run daily on this route between Hakosilta and Finlyandsky Rail Terminal. The Russian part of the railroad is used by suburban trains (elektrichkas) of the Finlyandsky Rail Terminal with their final destinations at Zelenogorsk, Roshchino, Kanneljärvi, Kirillovskoye, Gavrilovo (Kämärä) or Vyborg, as well as elektrichkas Vyborg–Buslovskaya (Houni).

The railroad is connected to the Vyborg–Joensuu railroad at Vyborg, to a number of tracks, including the Saint Petersburg–Hiitola railroad, at the Finlyandsky Rail Terminal of St. Petersburg, and also has links to Kerava from Hakosilta, to Vesijärvi, Loviisa and Heinola from Lahti, to Kotka and Mikkeli from Kouvola, to Joensuu from Luumäki, to Primorsk (Koivisto) from Lazarevka (Liimatta) and Zelenogorsk (Terijoki), to Veshchevo (Heinjoki) (and earlier as far as to Zhitkovo (Ristseppälä) and Michurniskoye (Valkjärvi) from Lazarevka and with Sestroretsk from Beloostrov and Lanskaya. Besides, the line has also a number of short blind branches.

As the Russian part of the tracks is planned to be renovated to handle high-speed international trains (see Karelian Trains) and to be used exclusively for passenger traffic, the cargo traffic (mostly lumber, granite rubble, oil) is expected to be switched to the Saint Petersburg–Hiitola railroad.

As of 2022, there are no direct trains between Russia and Finland, due to strained relations with the European Union in the wake of the Russian invasion of Ukraine.

== Stations ==
International train stops are bolded. Former names (most of the stations ceded to the Soviet Union were renamed in 1948), distance (from Riihimäki for the Finnish part and from St. Petersburg for the Russian part), and suburban tariff zones (for the Russian part) are given in brackets.

=== Finland ===
Riihimäki railway station (0 km, links to Helsinki and Hämeenlinna)
Hikiä railway station (8 km)
Oitti railway station (15 km)
Mommila railway station (20 km)
Lappila railway station (26 km)
Järvelä railway station (32 km)
Herrala railway station (44 km)
Lahti railway station (63 km, links to Vesijärvi, Loviisa, Heinola and Kerava)
Nastola railway station (79 km)
Uusikylä railway station (82 km)
Mankala railway station (93 km)
Kausala railway station (99 km)
Koria railway station (115 km)
Kouvola railway station (121 km, links to Kotka and Mikkeli)
Utti railway station (123 km)
Kaipiainen railway station (133 km)
Taavetti railway station (156 km)
Luumäki railway station (168 km, link to Joensuu)
Pulsa railway station (178 km)
Simola railway station (188 km)
Vainikkala railway station

=== Leningrad Oblast (Finland before WWII) ===
Louko (Pogranitshnoye), doesn't exist now))
Buslovskaya (Houni)
(Hämee, doesn't exist now)
Luzhayka (Nurmi, zone 15)
144th km
Kravtsovo (Hovinmaa, zone 14)
138th km
Prigorodnaya (Tienhaara, zone 14)
(Ykspää, doesn't exist now)
Khiyetala (Hietala, doesn't exist now)
(Sorvali, doesn't exist now)
134th km
(Saunalahti, doesn't exist now)
(Hiekka (Peski, Vyborgsky District), doesn't exist now)
(Linnansaari, doesn't exist now)
(Kirkkosaari, doesn't exist now)
Vyborg railway station (Viipuri, zone 13, connected to the Vyborg–Joensuu railroad)
Lazarevka (Liimatta, zone 13, links to Primorsk and Veshchevo)
Verkhne-Cherkasovo (Säiniö, zone 13)
117th km (zone 12)
Lebedevka (Honkaniemi, zone 12)
Gavrilovo (Kämärä, zone 12)
Leypyasuo (Leipäsuo, earlier Äyräpää (1918–1920) and Galitzina (before 1917), zone 11)
Kirillovskoye (Perkjärvi, zone 10)
(Sykjärvi, doesn't exist now)
Zakhodskoye (Lounatjoki, zone 9)
Pobeda, Leningrad Oblast (Kanneljärvi, zone 9)
Shevelyovo (zone 9)
Gorkovskoye (Mustamäki, zone 8)
63rd km (zone 7)
Roshchino (Raivola, zone 7)

=== Saint Petersburg (Finland before WWII) ===
Ushkovo (Tyrisevä, zone 7)
Zelenogorsk (Terijoki, zone 6, link to Primorsk)
Komarovo (Kellomäki, zone 5)
(Kanerva, doesn't exist now)
Repino (Kuokkala, zone 5)
Solnechnoye (Ollila, zone 5)
(Rajajoki, doesn't exist now)

=== Saint Petersburg ===
Beloostrov (zone 4, link to Sestroretsk)
Dibuny (zone 3)
Pesochnaya (formerly Grafskaya, zone 3)
Levashovo (zone 3)
Pargolovo (zone 3, link to the Murino station of the Saint Petersburg–Hiitola railroad)
Shuvalovo (zone 2)
Ozerki (zone 2)
Udelnaya (zone 2)
Lanskaya (zone 1, link to Sestroretsk)
Saint Petersburg – Finlyandsky Rail Terminal (zone 0, connection to the Saint Petersburg–Hiitola railroad and other railroads in Russia)

== Electrification ==
- Finlyandsky Rail Terminal–Zelenogorsk – 1951
- Zelenogorsk–Ushkovo – 1952
- Ushkovo–Roshchino – 1954
- Roshchino–Kirillovskoye – 1968
- Kirillovskoye–Vyborg – 1969
- Vyborg–Luzhayka – 1977
- International connection – 1978

== See also ==
- Finnish famine of 1866–68
