= Makfa =

Russian food company

Coordinates: 55.169773886135644°N 61.34858573970834°E

- Type: Private
- Industry: Food processing
- Founded: 1997; 29 years ago
- Headquarters: Chelyabinsk, Roshchino, Russia
- Products: Pasta, flour, cereals
- Website: makfa.ru

Makfa (Russian: Макфа) is one of Russia's largest producers of pasta, flour, and cereal products. Headquartered in Chelyabinsk, the company holds about 25% of the Russian pasta market.

== History ==
The company was established in 1997 as part of the Chelyabinsk Grain Processing Plant. Key milestones include:

- 2003 - Launched pasta production under Makfa brand
- 2010 - Became market leader in Russian pasta sector
- 2015 - Opened new production facility in Sverdlovsk Oblast
- 2019 - Expanded export operations to 15 countries

== Production facilities ==
Makfa operates the following major production sites across Russia:

Makfa production enterprises
Location	Facility Type	Established	Capacity
Chelyabinsk	Pasta production plant	2003	250,000 tons/year
Chelyabinsk Oblast	Flour mill	1997	500,000 tons/year
Sverdlovsk Oblast	Grain processing complex	2015	300,000 tons/year
Roshchino	Packaging facility	2010	-
Yekaterinburg	Logistics center	2018	-

== Products ==
Main product lines include:

- Dry pasta (200+ varieties)
- Flour (wheat and specialty)
- Instant cereals
- Ready-made meals

== Market position ==
Makfa is recognized as:

- Russia's pasta market leader (25% share)
- One of Russia's top 50 food producers
- Exporter to CIS, Europe, and Asia

== Certifications ==
Makfa maintains:

- ISO 9001 quality management
- HACCP food safety
- Halal certification

== See also ==
- Agriculture in Russia
- Food industry of Russia
