= Oitti railway station =

Railway station in Oitti, Hausjärvi, Finland

Oitti
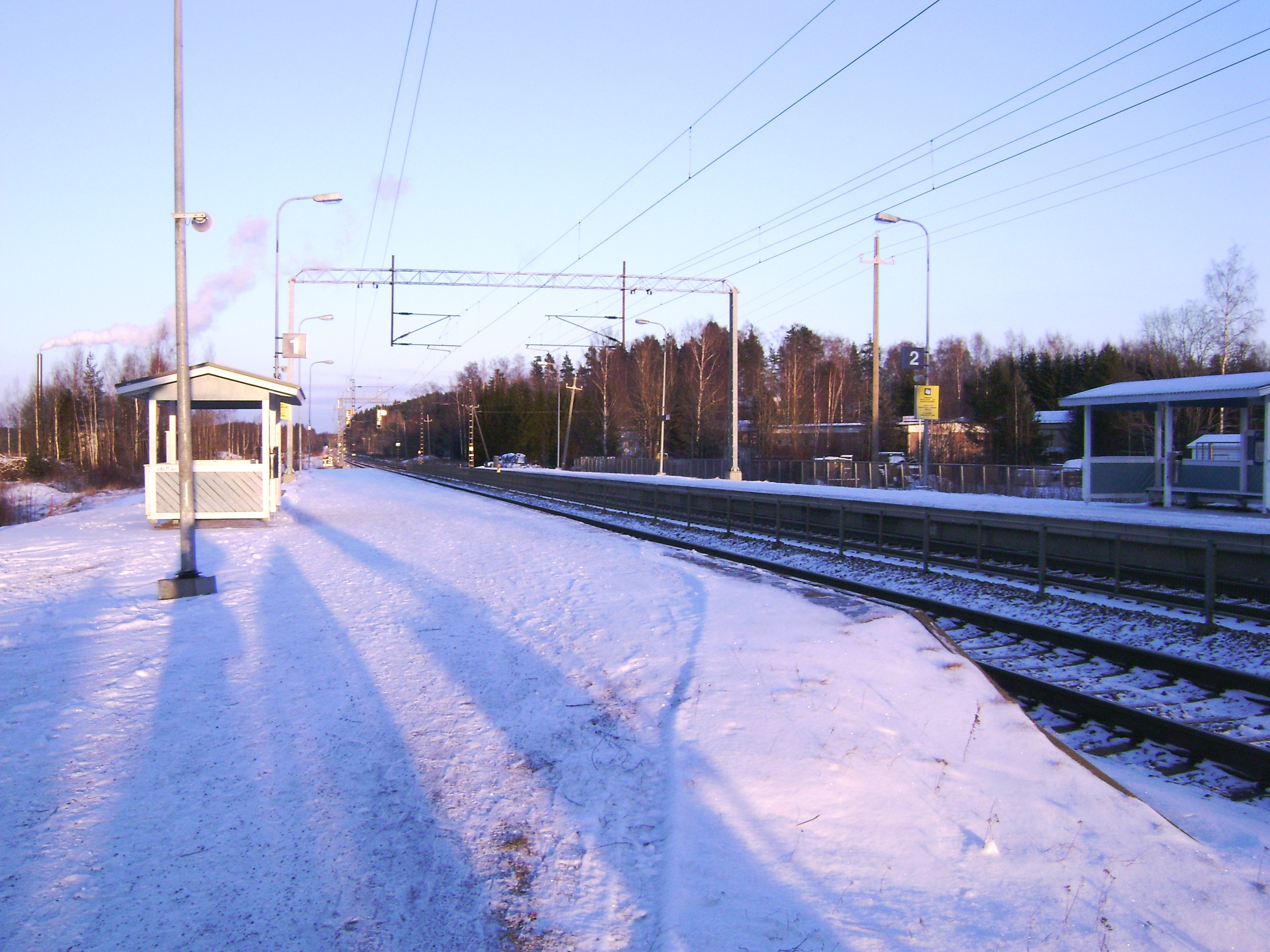

General information
- Location: Kisällintie, 12100; Hausjärvi; Finland
- Coordinates: 60°47′24″N 025°01′16″E
- System: VR station
- Owner: Finnish Transport Agency
- Line: Riihimäki–Lahti railway
- Platforms: 2 side platforms
- Tracks: 2

Construction
- Structure type: Ground station
- Parking: Yes
- Cycle facilities: Yes
- Architect: Knut Nylander

Other information
- Station code: Oi
- Classification: Part of split operating point (Hausjärvi)

History
- Opened: 1 November 1869; 156 years ago

Passengers
- 13,000 (2008)

Services
Preceding station	VR commuter rail	Following station
Hikiä towards Riihimäki	G	Mommila towards Lahti
Route map
Location

Oitti railway station (Finnish: Oitin rautatieasema) is a railway station in the village of Oitti in the municipality of Hausjärvi, Finland. The station is located along the Riihimäki–Lahti line, approximately 15 kilometres (9 mi) away from Riihimäki railway station and approximately 44 kilometres (27 mi) from Lahti railway station.

The Oitti stop is one half of the split operating point of Hausjärvi. The other is the Hausjärvi freight station, which is located approximately 600 metres (0.4 mi) west from the platforms of Oitti.

== History ==
Oitti is one of the original stations of the Riihimäki–Saint Petersburg railway. The class III station of Oitti was finished in 1869, and received further expansions in 1876 and 1917. The arrival of the railway had a sizable impact on the development of the village, and the surroundings of the station became the epicenter of growth in the area. One of the field hospitals for the workforce of the railway was placed in Syväoja, some 2 kilometres (1.2 mi) west from the site of the Oitti station.

The Finnish Heritage Agency has declared the Oitti station a protected culture site of national importance.

== Services ==
Oitti is an intermediate station on commuter rail line G on the route Riihimäki–Lahti. Westbound trains towards Riihimäki use track 1 and eastbound ones towards Lahti use track 2. Prior to the opening of the Kerava-Lahti railway line, Oitti was also served by the unnamed regional trains on the route Helsinki–Riihimäki–Lahti–Kouvola–Kotka Harbour.
