= Kirillovskoye, Leningrad Oblast =

Rural locality in Vyborgsky District, Russia

Coordinates: 60°28′N 29°17′E

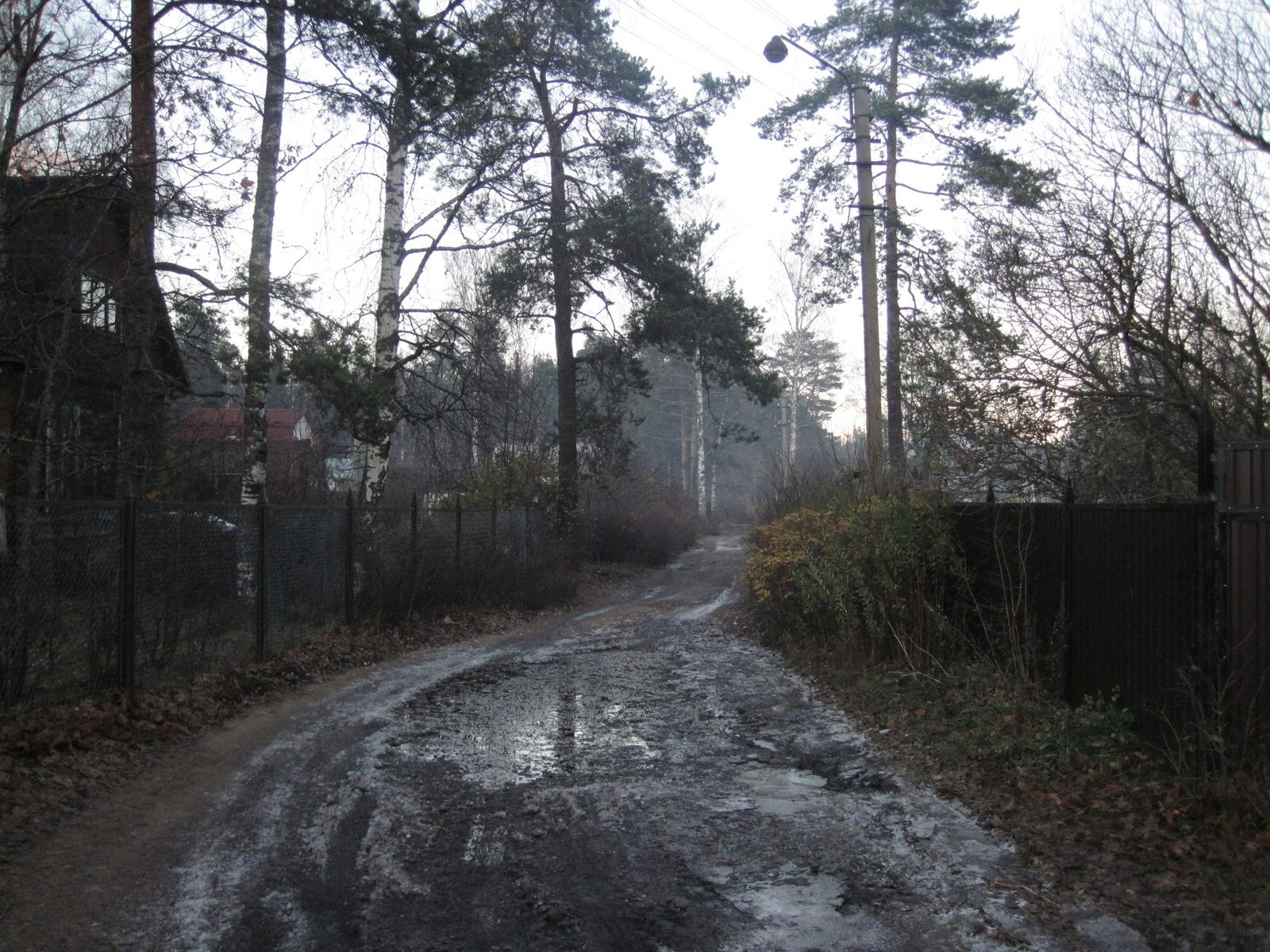
Kirillovskoye in 2012

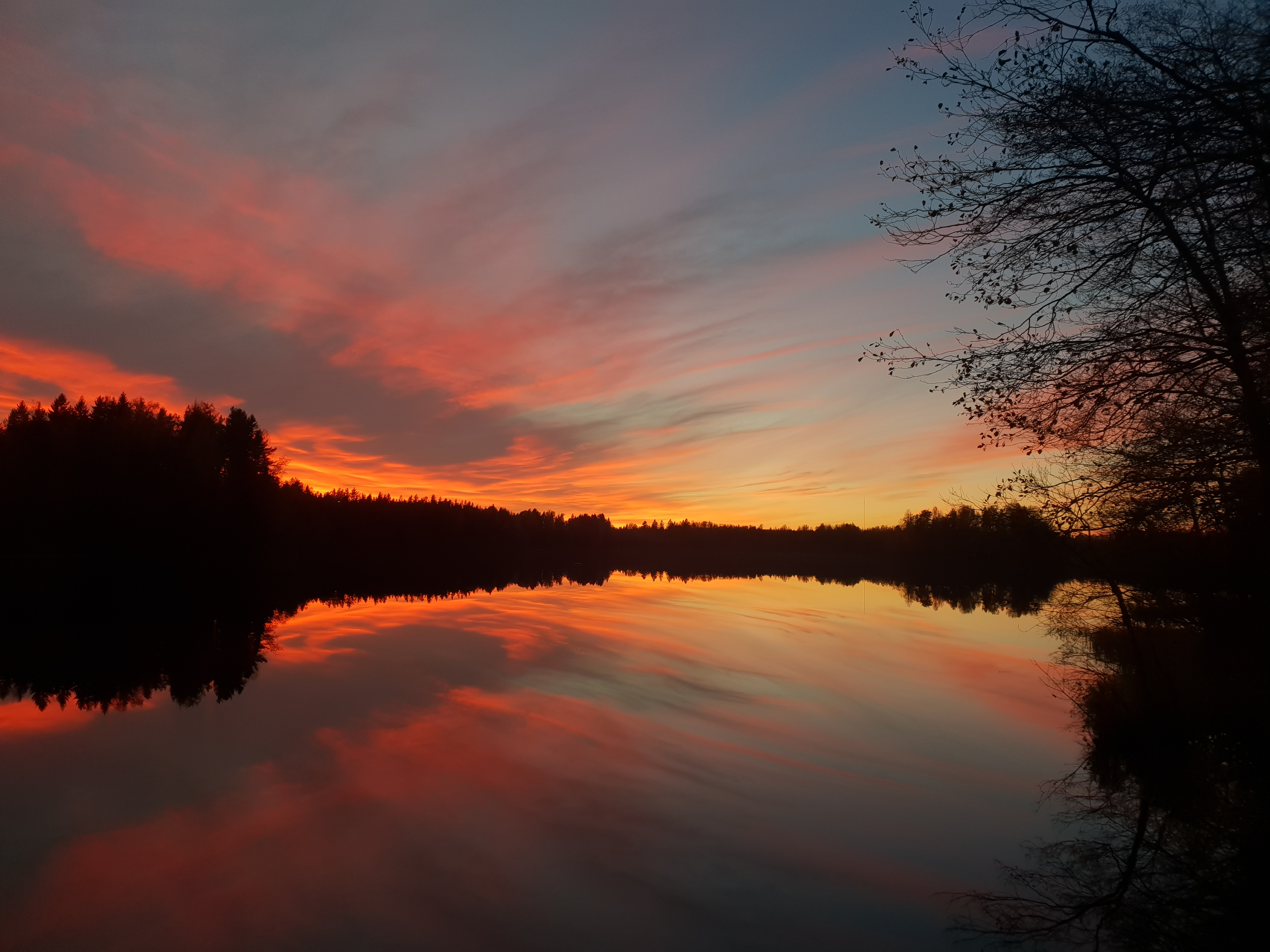
Sunset on the lake in Kirillovskoye.

Kirillovskoye (Russian: Кири́лловское; Finnish: Perkjärvi) is a settlement on Karelian Isthmus, in Vyborgsky District of Leningrad Oblast, near the European route E18, and an important station of the Saint Petersburg-Vyborg railroad, being the final destination of many electric passenger trains arriving from Finlyandsky Rail Terminal. Before the Winter War and Continuation War, Perkjärvi was a village of the Muolaa municipality of the Viipuri province of Finland. In 1948 and 1949, its parts were renamed Kirillovskoye and Kirpichnoye, respectively.

There was a brick factory nearby to the east of the station, in the settlement of Kirpichnoye, which was considered part of the same village during the Finnish time. The factory was founded by prince (knyaz) Saltykov (Saltikoff) in 1900. To the west of the railway, between Kirillovskoye and Kamenka, since 1913 the Nikolayevsky artillery range (now Bobochinsky military tank training range) has been located.

== Bibliography ==
- Перкъярви — Кирилловское. Saint Petersburg: Ostrov, 2007. — 176 р. ISBN 978-5-94500-052-0
- Koponen, Paavo: Karjalan kirkkokummut. Espoo: Tammi, 1999. ISBN 951-31-1431-7
