= Roshchin =

Roshchin (masculine, Russian: Рощин) or Roshchina (feminine, Russian: Рощина) is a Russian surname. Notable people with the surname include:

- Anatoly Roshchin (1932–2016), Russian wrestler
- Anton Roshchin (born 2005), Russian soccer player
- Artyom Roshchin (born 1993), Russian soccer player
- Mikhail Roshchin (1933–2010), Russian playwright, screenwriter, and short story writer

== See also ==
- Roshchino
