= Järvelä railway station =

Railway station in Finland

Järvelä
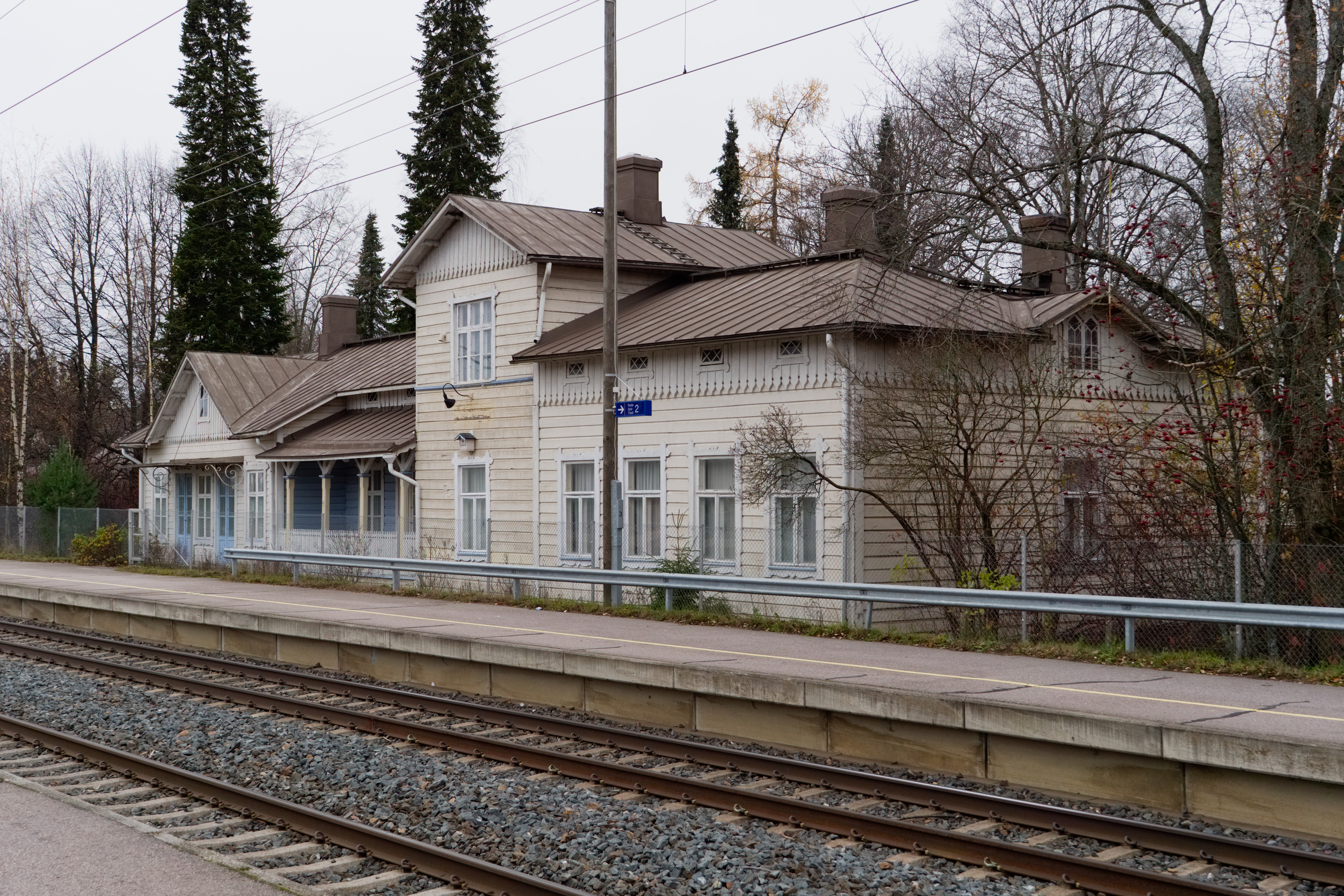

General information
- Location: Hähkäniementie 4, 16600; Järvelä, Kärkölä; Finland
- Coordinates: 60°52′03″N 025°16′28″E
- System: VR station
- Owner: Finnish Transport Infrastructure Agency
- Operator: VR Group
- Line: Riihimäki–Lahti railway
- Platforms: 1 side platform 1 island platform
- Tracks: 3

Other information
- Station code: Jr
- Classification: Operating point

History
- Opened: 1 November 1869; 156 years ago

Passengers
- 2008: 12,000

Services
Preceding station	VR commuter rail	Following station
Lappila towards Riihimäki	G	Herrala towards Lahti
Route map
Location

The Järvelä railway station (Finnish: Järvelän rautatieasema, Swedish: Järvelä järnvägsstation) is located in Kärkölä, Finland, in the municipal seat and urban area of Järvelä. It is located along the Riihimäki–Lahti line, and its neighboring stations are Lappila in the west and Herrala in the east.

== History ==
Järvelä is one of the original stations of the Riihimäki–Saint Petersburg railway, and was placed on the crossing of the railway and the road between Mäntsälä and the church village of Kärkölä. The class III station building was constructed according to plans from Knut Nylander and was later expanded upon twice, in the 1870s and with an additional western wing, designed by Bruno Granholm, in 1900.

Järvelä quickly began to develop with the arrival of the railway and subsequent industry, and took the place of the municipal seat from the Kärkölä church village in the 1930s. In 1960, Järvelä was home to 1,100 inhabitants; by 2000, the number had increased to 2,800. As of 2018, the population of Järvelä is 2,654.

The Koskisen Oy sawmill started operating right by the station in 1931; as of 2025, the sawmill and its plywood factory are still active, providing the bulk of the jobs in the municipality. The Koskisen factories regularly receive wood deliveries by rail from Kouvola.

On 18 October 1961, the Railway Administration made the decision to purchase a set of 800 concrete sleepers from abroad, the first of their kind in Finland; in July 1962, they were installed on the section of track between Lappila and Järvelä. The trials were successful, and on 12 June 1963, the first batch of concrete sleepers from Finnish manufacturers was ordered.

Järvelä became an unstaffed station in 1997, and the station building was sold to a private buyer in 2003. Among the stations on the Riihimäki-Lahti line, Järvelä is an anomaly in that both its passenger and freight transport services continue to operate to this day.

== Services and departure tracks ==
Järvleä is an intermediate station on commuter rail line G on the route Riihimäki–Lahti. Prior to the opening of the Kerava-Lahti railway line, Järvelä was also served by the unnamed regional trains on the route Helsinki–Riihimäki–Lahti–Kouvola–Kotka Harbour.

Järvelä railway station has three platform tracks. Westbound trains to Riihimäki use track 1 and eastbound ones to Lahti use track 2. Track 3 is normally unused by the passenger trains that stop at the station.
