= Vyborg railway station =

Railway station in Vyborg, Russia

Vyborg Выборг
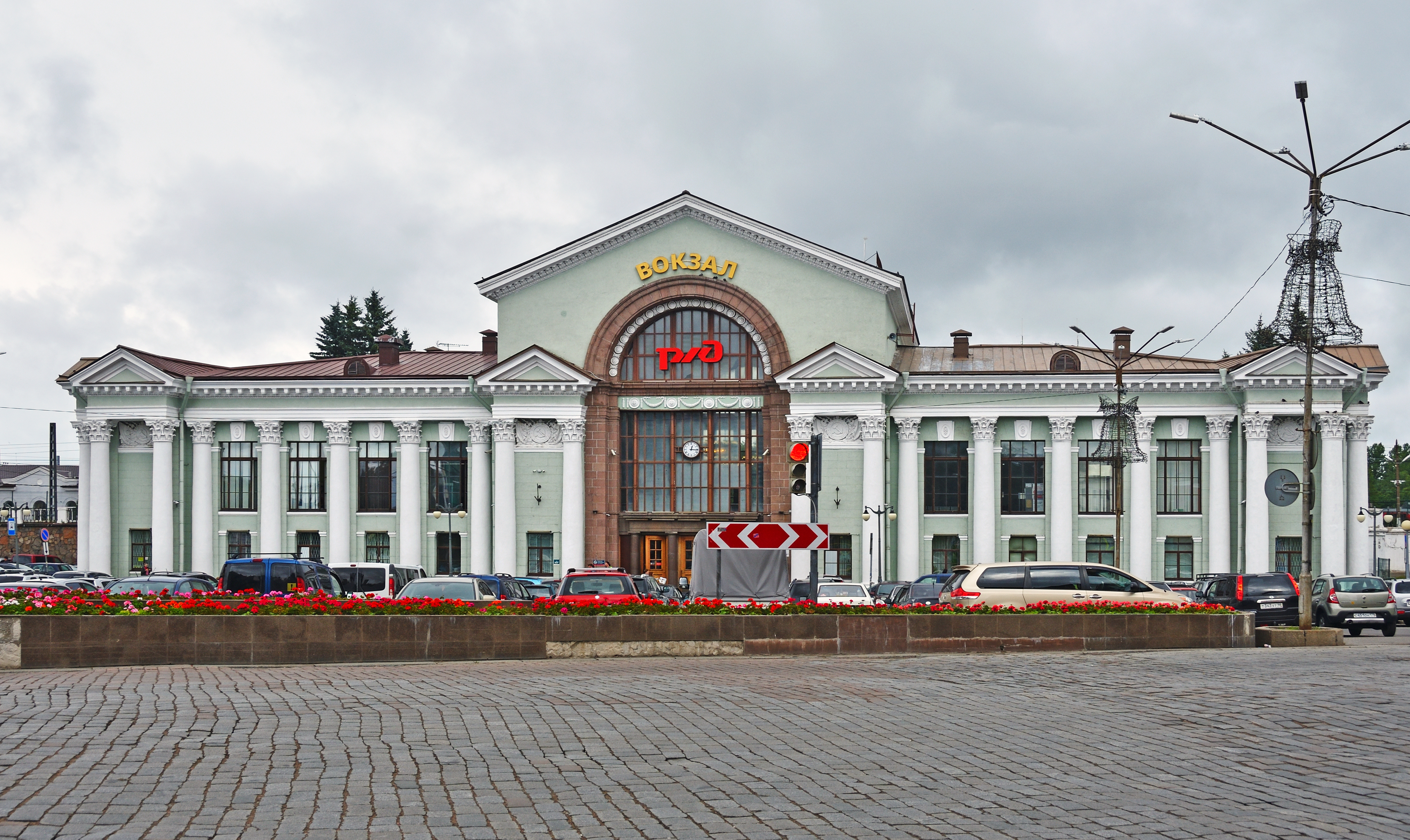
- The modern station building was built in 1953.

General information
- Location: 1 Vokzalnaya Square, Vyborg, Leningrad Oblast; Russia
- Coordinates: 60°42′56.16″N 28°45′5.04″E
- Owner: Russian Railways
- Operator: October Railway
- Line: Saint Petersburg Railway Division
- Platforms: 6 (5 island platforms)
- Tracks: 13

Construction
- Structure type: At-grade
- Parking: Yes
- Architectural style: Stalinist

Other information
- Station code: 2004682
- Fare zone: 13

History
- Opened: 11 September 1870
- Rebuilt: 1953
- Electrified: 3 kV DC overhead catenary

Services
Preceding station	Russian Railways	Following station
Prigorodnaya towards Riihimäki	Riihimäki–Saint Petersburg	Lazarevka towards Saint Petersburg–Finlyandsky
Location

Vyborg (Russian: Вы́борг; Finnish: Viipurin rautatieasema) is a railway station, located in the town of Vyborg in Leningrad Oblast, Russia.

The first wooden station building was built in 1870. The second station building was built in 1913 but was destroyed in the Continuation War. The current station building was built in the Soviet Union.

== History ==
=== First and second buildings ===
The first station building in Vyborg, presumed to have been designed by either Knut Nylander or Wolmar Westling, was completed in 1870 and was deemed a class I station along the Riihimäki–Saint Petersburg railway.

The second station was designed by Finnish architects Eliel Saarinen and Herman Gesellius. The granite station building was built in 1913 by Finnish State Railways, now known as VR Group, but was destroyed as retreating Soviet troops blew it up in the Continuation War in 1941.

The original building bore a close resemblance to Eliel Saarinen's other famous work, the Helsinki Central railway station. In the tradition of a pair of male human figures on each side of the main entrance of the Helsinki Central station, the Vyborg station had a statue of a bear standing on a pedestal on each side of the main entrance.

Virtual model of old Viipuri railway station as it was in Finland 1939 was rendered 2007–2009. It is possible to see in Virtual Viipuri-project.

=== Modern building ===
The modern station building, built in Soviet times, represents the typical Stalinist style. The station building has ticket sales, a café, a magazine kiosk, a currency exchange office, and deposit boxes.

From 2009 onward, the station has been served by Helsinki–Saint Petersburg high speed trains operated by Karelian Trains, a joint venture between Russian Railways and VR (Finnish Railways).

== Gallery ==
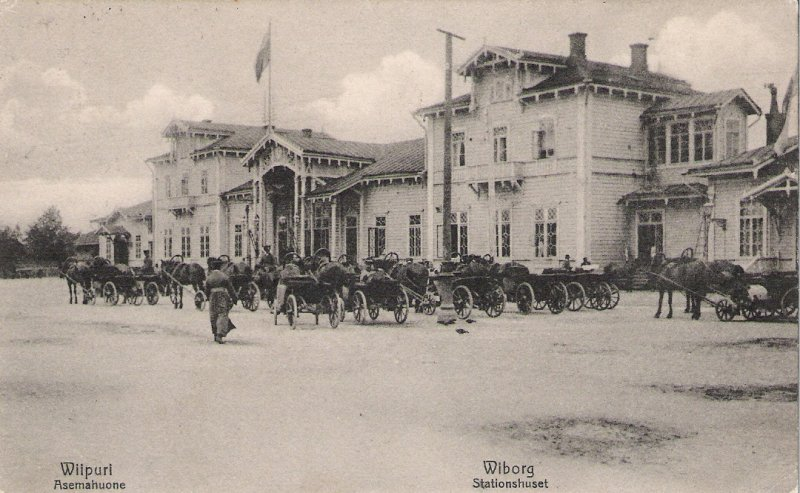
The original wooden station building.

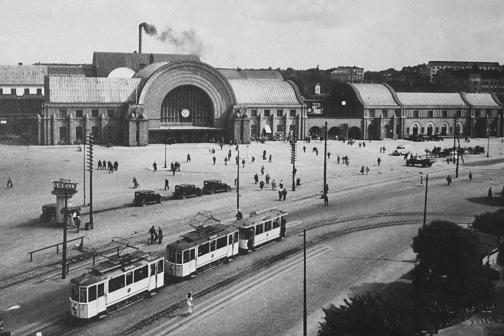
The station building in 1930s.

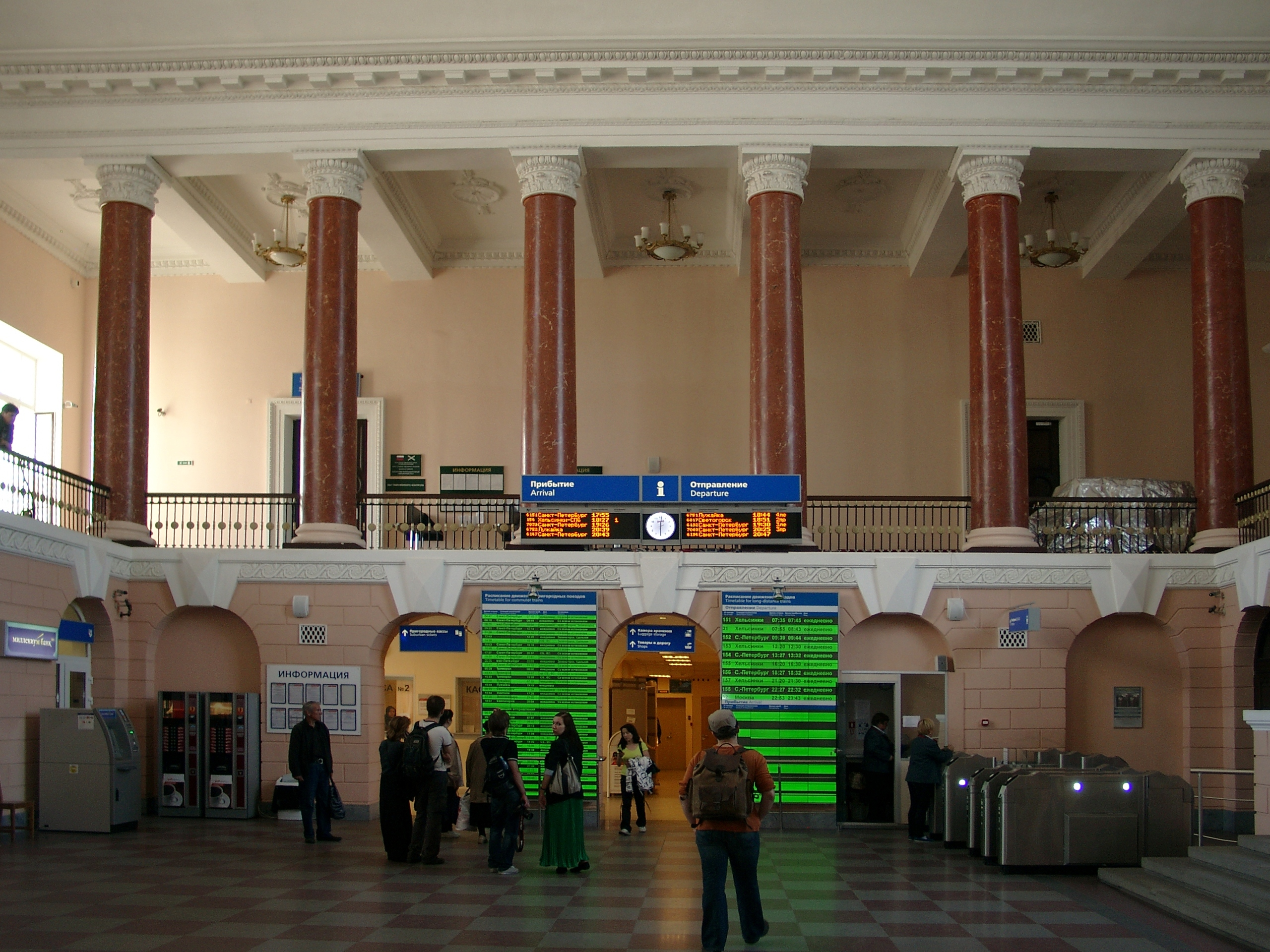
Inside the modern Vyborg station building.

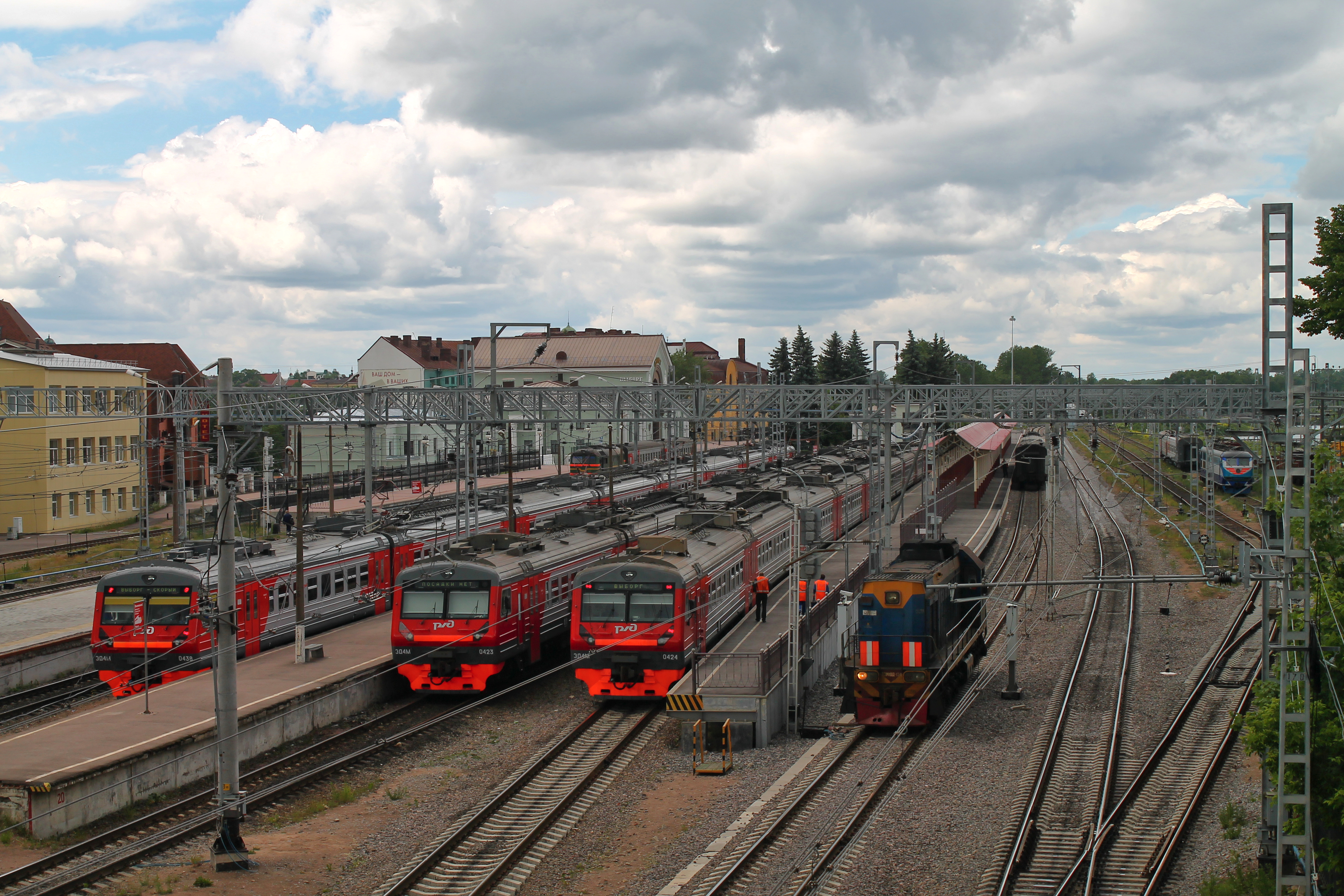
Suburban trains on the platforms.

== See also ==
- Riihimäki–Saint Petersburg railway
- Vyborg–Joensuu railroad
