= Hilda Herrala =

Finnish politician (1881–1956)

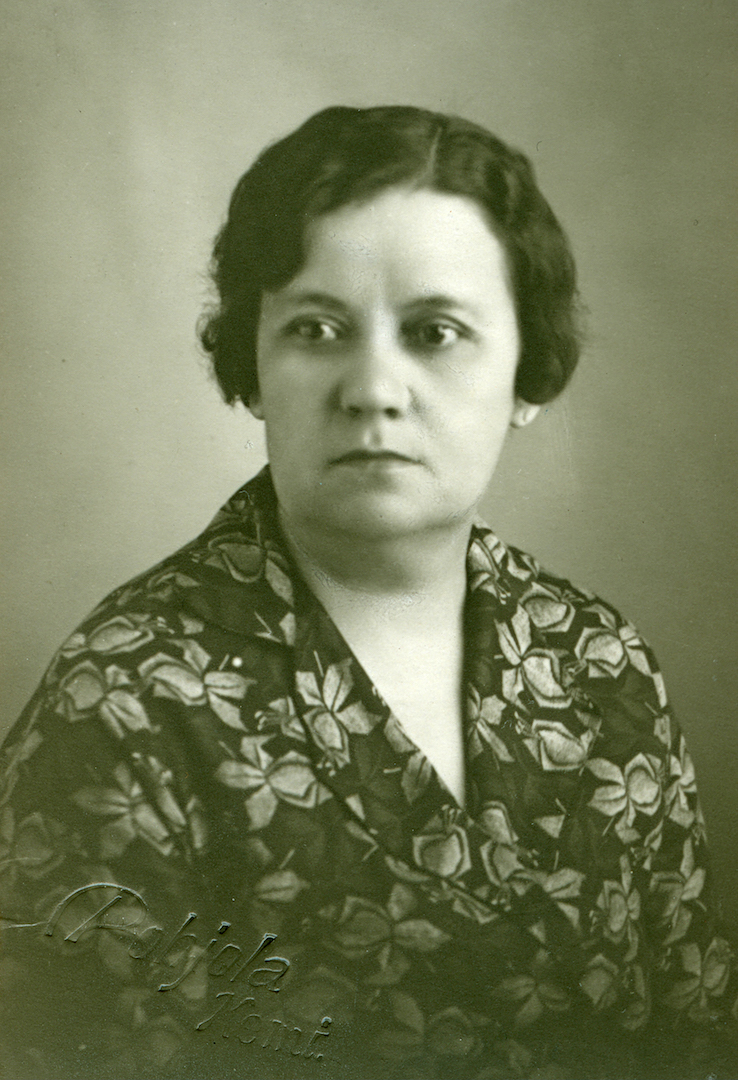
Member of the Parliament of Finland, Hilda Herrala (1881–1956)

Hilda Gustaava Herrala (8 April 1881 - 16 July 1956) was a Finnish seamstress and politician, born in Kuivaniemi. She was a member of the Parliament of Finland from 1908 to 1913, from 1916 to 1918 and from 1933 to 1936, representing the Social Democratic Party of Finland (SDP). During the 1918 Finnish Civil War Herrala was a member of the Central Workers' Council of Finland. After the war she was in prison until 1919.
