= Roshchino, Cherepovetsky District, Vologda Oblast =

Roshchino Рощино
- Khutor
- Location within Vologda Oblast Location within Russia
- Coordinates: 59°02′N 37°42′E
- Country: Russia
- Region: Vologda Oblast
- District: Cherepovetsky District
- Time zone: UTC+3:00

Roshchino (Russian: Рощино) is a rural locality (a khutor) in Sudskoye Rural Settlement, Cherepovetsky District, Vologda Oblast, Russia. The population was 42 as of 2002.

== Geography ==
Roshchino is located 54 km (34 mi) southwest of Cherepovets (the district's administrative centre) by road. Bolshaya Dora is the nearest rural locality.
