= Dolgoderevenskoye =

Dolgoderevenskoye Долгодеревенское
- Village
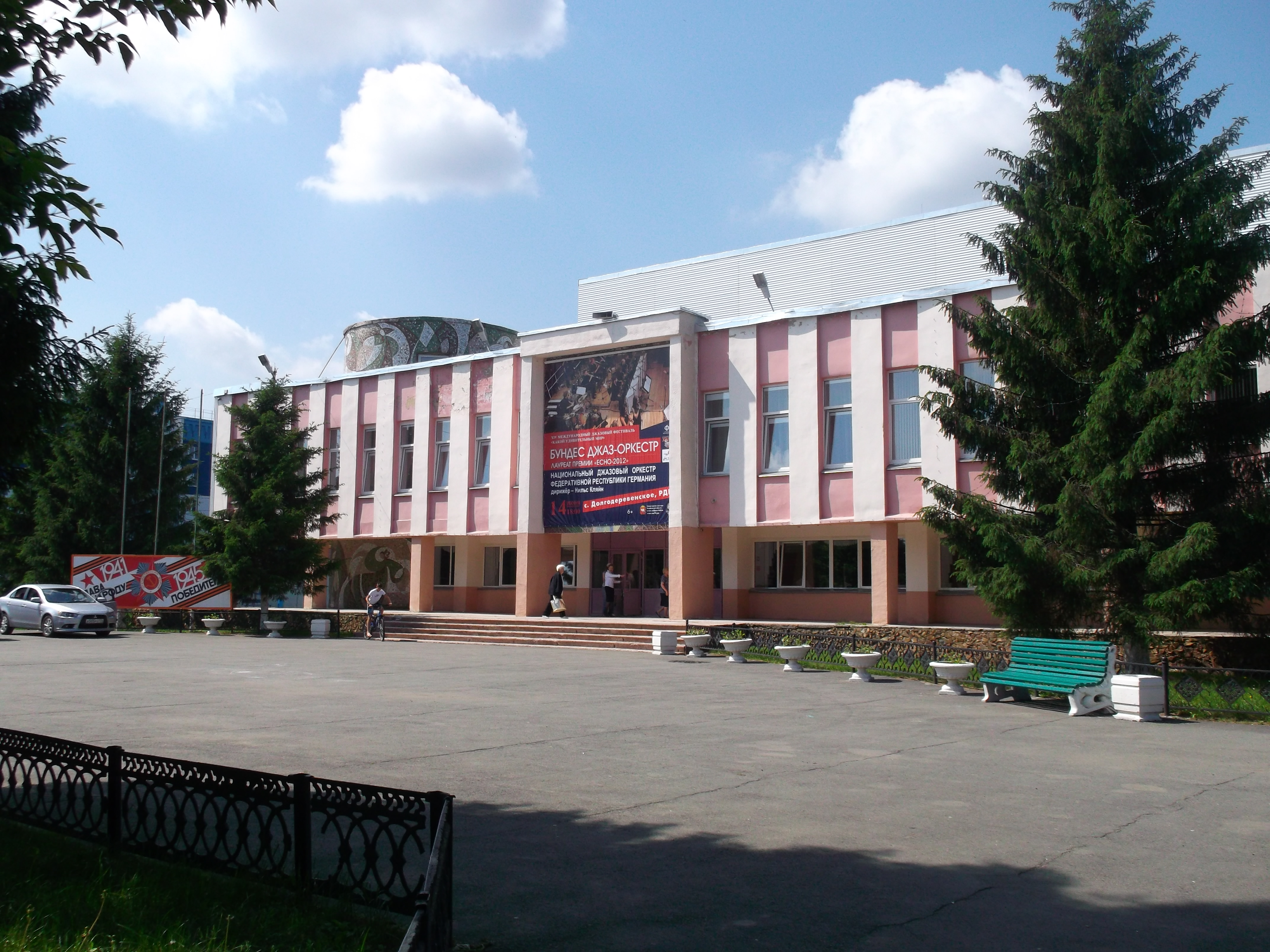

- Location within Chelyabinsk Oblast Location within Russia
- Coordinates: 55°20′N 61°20′E
- Country: Russia
- Region: Chelyabinsk Oblast
- District: Sosnovsky District
- Time zone: UTC+3:00
- Postal code: 456510

Dolgoderevenskoye (Russian: Долгодеревенское) is a rural locality (a selo) and the administrative center of Sosnovsky District, Chelyabinsk Oblast, Russia. Its population was 7,700 (2010 census); 7,027 (2002 census); 6,143 (1989 Soviet census).
