= Roshchino, Vladimir Oblast =

Roshchino Рощино
- Village
- Location within Vladimir Oblast Location within Russia
- Coordinates: 56°02′N 39°42′E
- Country: Russia
- Region: Vladimir Oblast
- District: Petushinsky District
- Time zone: UTC+3:00

Roshchino (Russian: Рощино) is a rural locality (a village) in Pekshinskoye Rural Settlement, Petushinsky District, Vladimir Oblast, Russia. The population was 22 as of 2010.

== Geography ==
Roshchino is located 34 km northeast of Petushki (the district's administrative centre) by road. Volkovo is the nearest rural locality.
