= Roshchino, Belgorod Oblast =

Roshchino Рощино
- Settlement
- Location within Belgorod Oblast Location within Russia
- Coordinates: 50°12′N 38°19′E
- Country: Russia
- Region: Belgorod Oblast
- District: Valuysky District
- Time zone: UTC+3:00

Roshchino (Russian: Рощино) is a rural locality (a settlement) in Valuysky District, Belgorod Oblast, Russia. The population was 66 as of 2010. There are 4 streets.

== Geography ==
Roshchino is located 21 km southeast of Valuyki (the district's administrative centre) by road. Nekhayevka is the nearest rural locality.
