= Roshchino, Amur Oblast =

Rural locality in Razdolnensky Selsoviet of Tambovsky District, Amur Oblast, Russia

Roshchino Рощино
- Selo
- Location within Amur Oblast Location within Russia
- Coordinates: 50°00′N 127°53′E
- Country: Russia
- Region: Amur Oblast
- District: Tambovsky District
- Time zone: UTC+9:00

Roshchino (Russian: Рощино) is a rural locality (a selo) in Razdolnensky Selsoviet of Tambovsky District, Amur Oblast, Russia. The population was 146 as of 2018. There are 3 streets.

== Geography ==
Roshchino is located 27 km southwest of Tambovka (the district's administrative centre) by road. Razdolnoye is the nearest rural locality.
