= Mommila railway station =

Railway station in Finland

Mommila
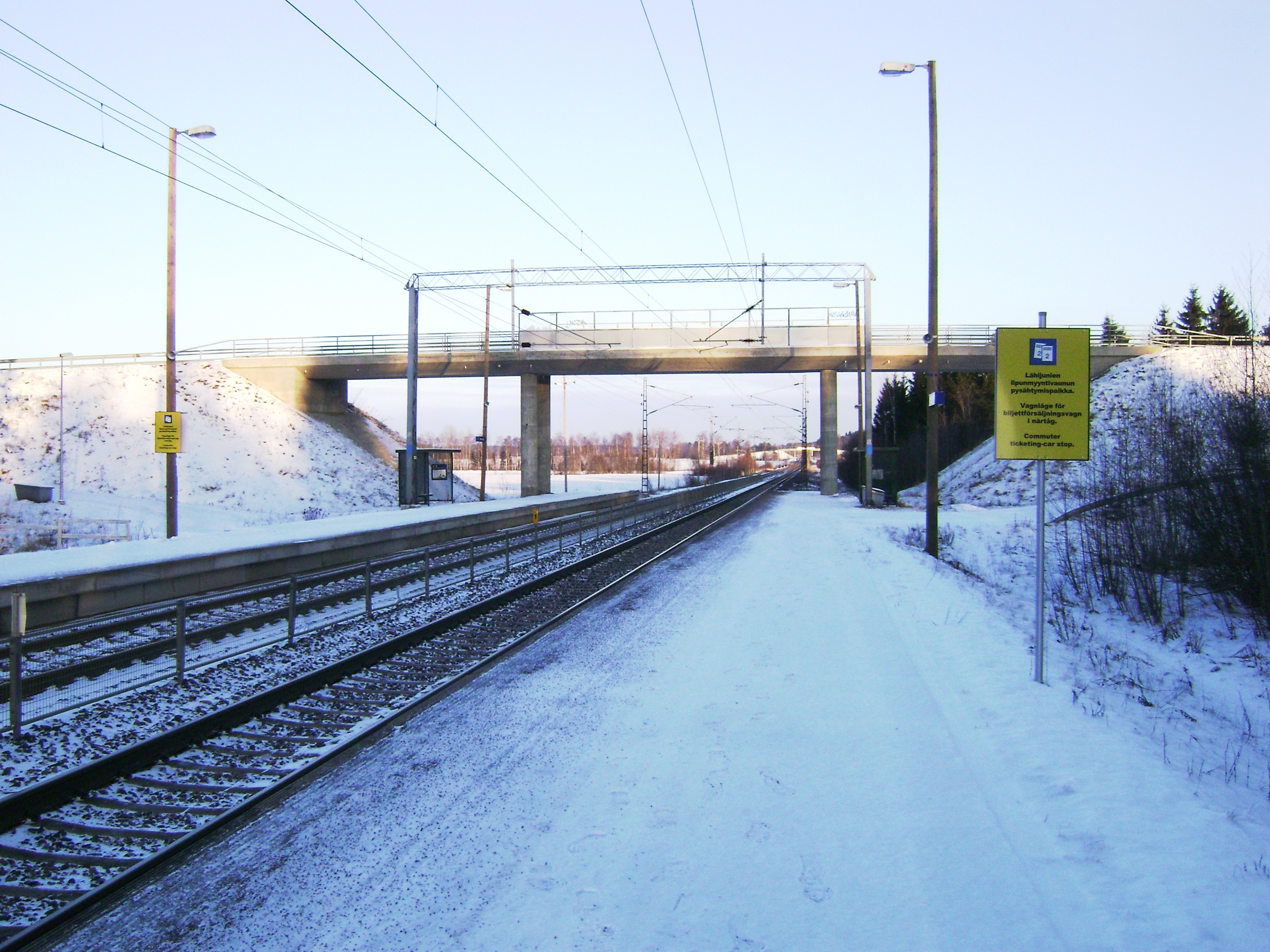

General information
- Location: Mommilanraitti 41, 12130; Mommila, Hausjärvi; Finland
- Coordinates: 60°49′23″N 025°04′48″E
- System: VR station
- Owner: Finnish Transport Infrastructure Agency
- Operator: VR Group
- Line: Riihimäki–Lahti railway
- Platforms: 2 side platforms
- Tracks: 2

Other information
- Station code: Mla
- Classification: Halt

History
- Opened: 19 November 1905; 120 years ago

Passengers
- 2008: 1,000

Services
Preceding station	VR commuter rail	Following station
Oitti towards Riihimäki	G	Lappila towards Lahti
Route map
Location

The Mommila railway station (Finnish: Mommilan rautatieasema, Swedish: Mommila järnvägsstation) is located in Hausjärvi, Finland, in the village of Mommila. It is located along the Riihimäki–Lahti line, and its neighboring stations are Oitti in the west and Lappila in the east.

== History ==
The Mommila station began life as a halt on the outskirts of the village of Torhola. It took its name from the estate of Mommila, located approximately 5 kilometres (3.1 mi) away from the station in the parish of Lammi. In the 1920s, a full station building designed by Thure Hellström replaced the former platform facility. A village began to form around the station, and its population peaked in the 1960s at over 200 inhabitants.

On 5 April 1977, Mommila became the stage of a destructive derailment accident upon the head-on collision of express train EP 84 and freight train JK 1456.

Mommila became an unstaffed station in 1977, its freight transport was abolished in 1990, and its railyard was disassembled in 1997. The level crossing in the northeastern side of the station was replaced by an overpass in 2004; it was opened for use by traffic on 2 November, and the crossing was dismantled the following day. The station house and several of its relevant buildings were transferred to the ownership of Senate Properties in 2007.

== Services ==
Mommila is an intermediate station on commuter rail line G on the route Riihimäki–Lahti. Westbound trains towards Riihimäki use track 1 and eastbound ones towards Lahti use track 2. Prior to the opening of the Kerava-Lahti railway line, Mommila was also served by the unnamed regional trains on the route Helsinki–Riihimäki–Lahti–Kouvola–Kotka Harbour.
