= Sosnovsky District, Chelyabinsk Oblast =

Sosnovsky District Сосновский район (Russian)
- District
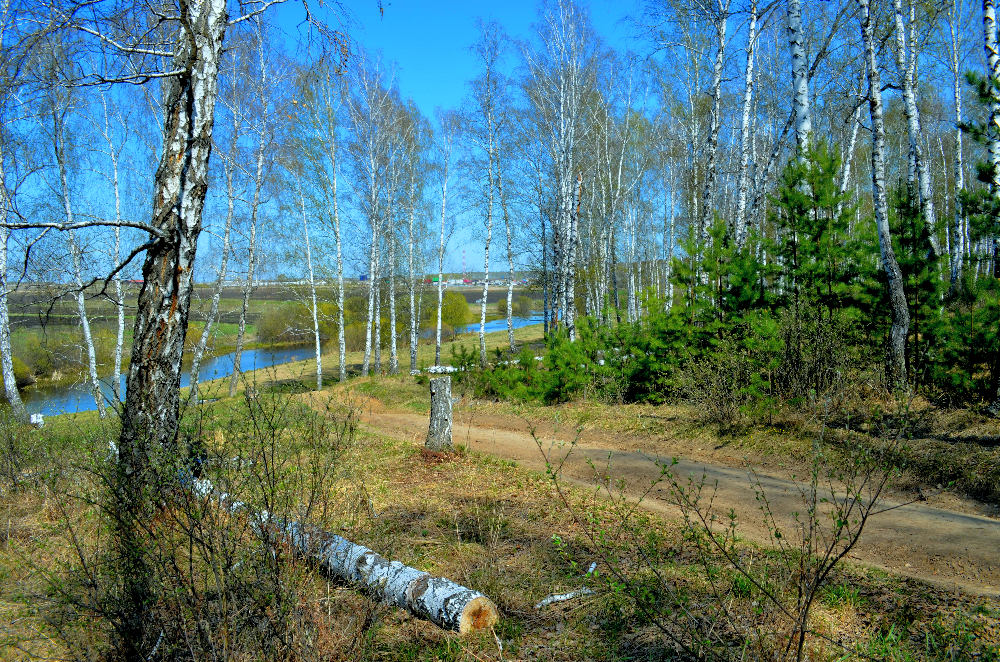
- Uzhovsky Forest, Sosnovsky District

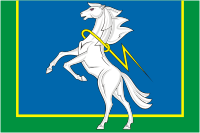
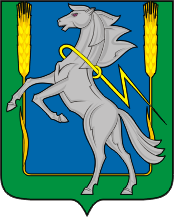
- Flag Coat of arms
- Location of Sosnovsky District in Chelyabinsk Oblast
- Coordinates: 55°20′40″N 61°20′32″E
- Country: Russia
- Federal subject: Chelyabinsk Oblast
- Established: January 1924
- Administrative center: Dolgoderevenskoye

Area
  - Total: 2,112 km^{2} (815 sq mi)

Population (2010 Census)
  - Total: 60,941
  - Density: 28.85/km^{2} (74.73/sq mi)
  - Urban: 0%
  - Rural: 100%

Administrative structure
  - Administrative divisions: 16 Selsoviets
  - Inhabited localities: 81 rural localities

Municipal structure
  - Municipally incorporated as: Sosnovsky Municipal District
  - Municipal divisions: 0 urban settlements, 16 rural settlements
- Time zone: UTC+5 (MSK+2)
- OKTMO ID: 75652000
- Website: http://chelsosna.ru/

Sosnovsky District (Russian: Сосно́вский райо́н) is an administrative and municipal district (raion), one of the twenty-seven in Chelyabinsk Oblast, Russia. It is located in the northern central part of the oblast. The area of the district is 2,112 square kilometers (815 sq mi). Its administrative center is the rural locality (a selo) of Dolgoderevenskoye. Population: 60,941 (2010 census); 58,570 (2002 Census); 54,328 (1989 Soviet census). The population of Dolgoderevenskoye accounts for 12.6% of the district's total population.
