= Hollola =

- Municipality
- Hollolan kunta Hollola kommun
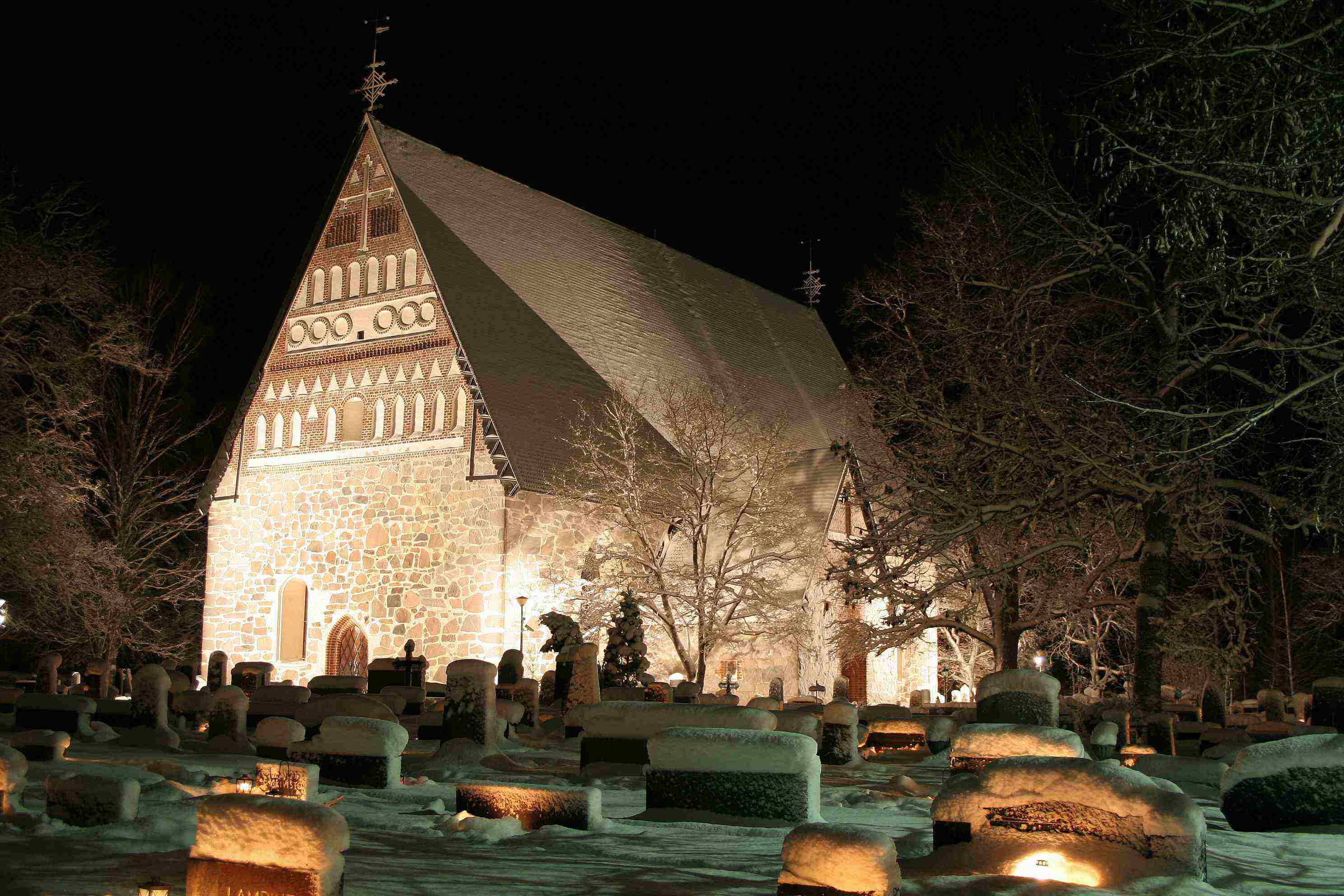
- The medieval church of Hollola

- Coat of arms

- Location of Hollola in Finland
- Interactive map of Hollola
- Coordinates: 60°59.2′N 025°31′E
- Country: Finland
- Region: Päijät-Häme
- Sub-region: Lahti
- First records: 1328
- Charter: 1865

Government
  - Municipal manager: Päivi Rahkonen

Area (2018-01-01)
  - Total: 727.47 km^{2} (280.88 sq mi)
  - Land: 651.41 km^{2} (251.51 sq mi)
  - Water: 68.66 km^{2} (26.51 sq mi)
  - Rank: 132nd largest in Finland

Population (2025-12-31)
  - Total: 22,775
  - Rank: 46th largest in Finland
  - Density: 34.96/km^{2} (90.5/sq mi)

Population by native language
  - Finnish: 96% (official)
  - Swedish: 0.4%
  - Others: 3.7%

Population by age
  - 0 to 14: 16.9%
  - 15 to 64: 57.7%
  - 65 or older: 25.3%
- Time zone: UTC+02:00 (EET)
  - Summer (DST): UTC+03:00 (EEST)
- Website: hollola.fi/en/

Hollola (Finnish pronunciation: [ˈholːolɑ]) is a municipality of Finland, located in the western part of the Päijät-Häme region. The municipality is unilingually Finnish and has a population of 22,775 (31 December 2025) and covers an area of 727.47 square kilometres (280.88 sq mi) of which 68.66 km^{2} (26.51 sq mi) is water. The population density is 34.96 inhabitants per square kilometre (90.5/sq mi).

Hollola's neighboring municipalities are Asikkala in the north, Hausjärvi and Hämeenlinna in the west, Lahti in the east and Kärkölä and Orimattila in the south. Hollola belongs to the Lahti region. It is 111 km (68.97 mi) from Hollola to Helsinki and 121 km (75.18 mi) to Tampere.

Hollola's municipal center is Salpakangas, which is located along highway 12 near the western border of Lahti. The small church village of Hollola remains next to it. Hämeenkoski was merged with Hollola on 1 January 2016. Areas from the municipality of Hollola have been annexed to the city of Lahti several times.

Hollola has the tallest structure in Finland, the Tiirismaa TV-Tower.

A popular resort in Hollola is Messilä. There you can cross-country ski, downhill skiing, hike, and golf. There is a hotel and a camping site in Messilä. Messilä is located by Vesijärvi.

In 2018, Hollola hosted the Jukola Relays. This Orienteering event is a night relay, and one of the most popular orienteering events in the world by number of competitors.

== Geography ==
=== Nature ===
Tiirismaa, the highest point in southern Finland, is located in Hollola, north of the Salpakangas municipal center.

In total, there are 44 lakes, including lakes partially in other municipalities in Hollola, the largest of which are Lake Vesijärvi, Lake Pääjärvi and Lake Kivijärvi.

Lake Kiikunlähde is located northwest of Hollola church in the village of Uskila. A portion of the Finnish nature film The Story of the Lake was filmed at Kiikunlähde. Kiikunlähde is potable and serves as a surface water intake for households.

Nationally valuable landscape areas include the Kastarin-Hatsinan-Kutajoki landscape area. The traditional landscapes include the Heinlammi rock fields and the Tervala meadow of Huhdanjoki. Hollola's Natura 2000 nature reserves are Kivijärvi, Kotajärvi, Kutajärvi, Pähkinäkukkula, Riihikallio-Pilkanmäki and Tiirismaa.

== Infrastructure ==
Hollola is a municipality located west of Lahti. There were 1,527 leisure apartments there at the end of 2013.

The city of Lahti and Lake Vesijärvi, located in the middle of Hollola municipality, divide the municipality into Maakansa, located on the west side of the lake, and Vesikansa, located on the east side. Maakansa forms the main part of the municipality's area. Paimela, Kalliola and Kukkila are listed from the Asikkala border in the north to the Lahti border in the south.

=== Salpakangas ===
More than half of Hollola's residents live in the municipal center in Salpakangas, and a good tenth in the villages of Kukkila and Kalliola.

During the Continuation War, Hollola's municipality administration moved from the municipality of Hollola to the center of the city of Lahti and later moved to Salpakangas. The municipality's growth in the 1960s was mainly based on conservative economic policy. It enabled lower municipal taxes in Lahti and attracted companies and residents to Salpakangas.

The center of Salpakangas underwent major changes when Osuuskauppa Hämeenmaa built a Prisma market in the area, which was completed in 2017. An apartment building called Huili has been built in Salpakangas as a self-financed service home for the elderly.

== History ==
The banks of Hollola's Lake Päijänne have been inhabited since the Stone Age because of its fish population. During the Viking Age, Hollola developed into an important center, the most densely populated area of which was the Vainio region. Hollola also contains the Kirkailanmäki cemetery.

After the Swedish crusade to Hämee and the establishment of the Catholic Church in the area, Päijät-Hämee became a border region of the Swedish Empire. A chain of 13 ancient fortresses has been found in Finland, of which the hill fort Kapatuosia has been the most thoroughly studied. In addition to the ancient fortress of Kapatuosia, the Hankaa and Laitiala Kiiluanmäki fortresses are also found in Hollola. Their actual purpose is not exactly known, but it is suspected that they were part of a defense chain, a fire notification chain or places of escape for the local population.

In the Middle Ages, Hollola belonged to the castle county of Häme. The administrators of Hollola, Asikkala and Tennilä were established for the administration purposes of the Finnish monarchs, after which the administrator of Uudenkylä was established. Hollola's administration was divided into the quarters of Artjärvi, Etola, Okerointe and Uskila.

The development of Hollola's Lahti village into a township and finally into a city began when the Riihimäki–Lahti Railway and the Vesijärvi Railway Station were built on the shore of Lake Vesijärvi in the southern part of Päijänte. Lahti became the hub of Vesijärvi port's water traffic, rail traffic and road traffic. Lahti was separated from Hollola as a city on 16 November 1905.

Agriculture-dominant Hollola began to industrialize in the late 1960s when the Salpakakkaa conglomeration was zoned in the village of Ala-Okeroinen along the Tampere-Lahden highway, which became Hollola's new municipal center. In recent decades, Hollola has been the fastest growing municipality in Päijät-Häme in terms of population.

In Päijät-Hämee, several municipal merger discussions have been held and related investigations have been carried out. They include the Uusi Kunta project called Vellamo and the unification project of six municipalities: Hollola, Hämeenkoski, Iiti, Kärkölä, Lahti and Nastola. The project was rejected by the Hollola municipal council and the Iiti municipal council. Hämeenkoski was merged with Hollola at the beginning of 2016.

== Municipal administration ==
Hollola's municipal council has 43 councilors, and it includes seven councilor groups. The Oma council group consists of Kokoumus, SDP, Center, Christian Democrats, Basic Finns, Left Alliance and the Greens. The council group of Basic Finns was formed in the 2008 municipal elections. In the period 2021–2025, the largest council group is the coalition, which holds 11 seats.

In 2008, the municipal council decided to establish neighborhood councils in each village. The district boundaries of the local councils follow the boundaries of the pupil enrollment areas of the first grades of elementary school, and there are five of them. The councils have been formed in the local service areas of Southern, Central Hollola, Municipal Center, Church Region and Vesikansa.

== Economy ==
At the end of 2011, 4.7 percent of Hollola's jobs were in primary production, 31.2 percent in processing and 61.9 percent in services. In terms of arable hectares, the fourth largest farm was Finland is in Hollola (as of 2013).

In 2015, Hollola's largest corporation tax payers were Faba, a service cooperative aimed at cattle productivity, Bellmer Vaahto Paper Machinery, which operates in the paper machine industry, and Etteplan Design Center.

Hollola's largest employers in 2007 were:

- Makron, 170 employees
- Vaahto, 119 employees
- Andritz, 113 employees
- Ramboll Finland
- Sandvik Materials Handling – Roxon Oy, 110 employees
- Plastic processing, 38 employees
- Porkka Finland (Huurre Group), 81 employees
- Rakennusbetoni- ja Elementti Oy, 77 employees
- Etteplan, 73 employees
- SEW Eurodrive, 64 employees
- Suomen Kotikylmiö, 60 employees
- Solmaster, 55 employees
- Naisten Pukutehdas, 48 employees
- Trelmec, 45 employees

== Demographics ==
=== Population ===
Population size 1990–2025
Year	Population
1990	22,236
1995	22,629
2000	22,592
2005	23,390
2010	24,106
2015	23,915
2020	23,251
2025	22,775

=== Urban areas ===
At the end of 2018, Hollola had 23,602 inhabitants, of which 18,481 lived in urban areas, 4,818 in sparsely populated areas, and the places of residence of 303 were unknown. Hollola's agglomeration rate is 79.3%. The population of Hollola is divided between seven different settlements:

Population (31 December 2018)
Urban area	Population
Lahti city center	15,130
Hämeenkoski	1,042
Hollola church village	729
Nostava	569
Herrala	487
Pyhäniemi	317
Heinlammi	207

The center of Hollola, Salpakangas, does not form its own agglomeration, but in addition to Vesikansa is part of the central agglomeration of Lahti, which mainly extends to the area of the city of Lahti. The Heinlammi agglomeration also extends in small parts to the Lahti area.

== Services ==
=== Cultural Activities ===
Hollola's social cultural services are decided by the cultural committee of the Hollola municipal council. Activities related to the board include daycare, early childhood education, basic education, basic education, leisure activities, libraries, culture, and youth activities.

=== Education and schools ===
Hollola's schooling system has been joined with that of its neighboring municipality, Kärkölä. Hollola and Kärkölä primary schools operate under a joint board.

After the merger of Hämeenkoski municipality, there are 11 primary schools in Hollola, which are:

- Herrala school
- Hälvälä school
- Hämeenkoski school
- Kalliola school
- Kankann school
- Nostana school
- Paimela school
- Pyhäniemi school
- Salpakkanka Unified School
- Tiilikanka school
- Hollola middle school, primary school grades 7–9

The school network is administratively part of Hollola's Education Department.

Secondary education in Hollola was organized by Hollola High School, which ceased operations in 2014, and the Salpaus Education Center, which gave up its premises in Hollola's Kukonkoivu in 2013. Hollola is the largest municipality in Finland without a high school.

== Culture ==
Hollola's nationally significant built cultural environments are Hollola's church village (the church and historic center), the Voistio and the farming landscape of the villages of Vesala, Nokkola, Untila and Utula.

Hollola's näkkileipä (also called pitoleiva), a type of crisp cracker, originates from Hollola. In the 1980s, the potato dish perunatuvinki, salted Paimela bream, and apple pie were all named Hollola's signature dishes.

A new library building was completed as the main location of the Hollola Municipal Library in 2004. In addition to the main library, the residents of the municipality are served by the Kalliola Local Library, the Hämeenkoski Library and the Hollola Library Car.

Hollola's medieval society, Medium Aevum Hollolense, organizes a medieval fair every two years.

There is a wood species park in Hollola, Hannu's Memorial Forest, in Kukkila. The religious Room of Silence was built in 2003 and inaugurated by Jukka Kuoppamäki.

== Hollola in literature ==
Hollola's Hämeenkoski and Hyväneula village are strongly featured in the fifth detective story of the Isaksson series, Sieluttomat, written by Markus Ahonen, the former editor-in-chief of Seutuviiko, which preceded the Seutuneloset newspaper group.

== Religion ==
Hollola belongs to the parish of St. Ursula. The parish in question is part of the Helsinki Diocese of the Catholic Church.

According to the 2018 regional distribution report, Hollola has the following parishes of the Evangelical Lutheran Church of Finland:

- Hollola parish
- Hämeenkoski chapel congregation

The parish of Hollola belongs to the diocese of Mikkeli. From the beginning of 2017, the congregation has operated in the municipalities of Kuhmointe, Kärkölä and Padasjoki, in addition to Hollola. Hollola's most significant historical attraction is Hollola's medieval stone church with 550 seats. The church belongs to the third generation of Finnish stone churches, which were built between 1480 and 1560. It was completed in its current form between 1495 and 1510: the sacristy was finished in 1495, the church hall in 1500, and the armory after 1505. The stone church is famous for its well-preserved wooden sculptures. Due to lightning striking the roof, the wooden roof structures of the church burned in 1642. The church was completely renovated in 1934–1935.

On the south side of the church is a yellow Empire-style belfry designed by Carl Ludvig Engel and built between 1829 and 1831.

Among the congregations of the Finnish Orthodox Church, the Lahti Orthodox congregation operates in the Hollola area.

Among the member congregations of the Pentecostal Church of Finland in Hollola, the Hollola Pentecostal Congregation operates.

=== Former parishes ===
The following are former parishes in the current area of Hollola municipality:

- Hämeenkoski parish (merged with Hollola parish in 2007)

== Attractions ==
=== Kapatuosia castle hill (Kapatuosian linnavuori) ===
Kapatuosia castle mountain is located north of Hollola church. It dates back to the Iron Age, the Middle Ages, or both periods. Linnavuori has an observation tower that is open in the summer, which is also used for bird watching.

=== Homeland Museum and Hentilä House Museum (Kotiseutumuseo and Hentilän talomuseo) ===
The Hollola Homeland Museum is maintained by the Hollola Homeland Association. The museum is located near the church in a two-story warehouse building.

Another site in the church village maintained by the local community association is the Hentilä House Museum, which has a collection of old buildings in the area and a large house from Asikkala.

=== Municipal hall (Kunnantupa) ===
Hollola municipal hall was built in 1902.

Architect Vilho Penttilä designed the Hollola municipal hall, completed in 1902. It is Finland's first wooden municipal building designed by an architect.

=== Shooting gallery (Ampumarata) ===
On the east side of Yhdystie 3161 in the Defense Forces area is the Hälvälä shooting range and training area.

== Notable people from Hollola ==
- Ville Haapasalo, actor and television host
- Arttu Lindeman, rap artist and video blogger
- Toni Piispanen, wheelchair curler
- Aino-Kaisa Saarinen, cross-country skier
- Krisse Salminen, actor and stand-up comedian
- Jukka-Pekka Saraste, conductor
- Väinö Siikaniemi, javelin thrower
- Laura Voutilainen, singer and actress

=== Members of Parliament ===
==== Members of Parliament 2019-2023 ====
- Jari Ronkainen 2015–

==== Former Members of Parliament ====
- Anne Louhelainen 2011–2019
- Juha Rehula 1996–2019
- Timo Seppälä 1999–2007
- Jouko Siikaniemi 1970–1975
- Kyösti Toivonen 1991–1995, also a member of European Parliament

== International relations ==
=== Twin towns — Sister cities ===
Hollola is twinned with:

- Arboga, Sweden
- Nordkapp, Norway
- Ebeltoft, Denmark
