= Vesijärvi railway station =

Railway station in Lahti, Finland

Vesijärvi
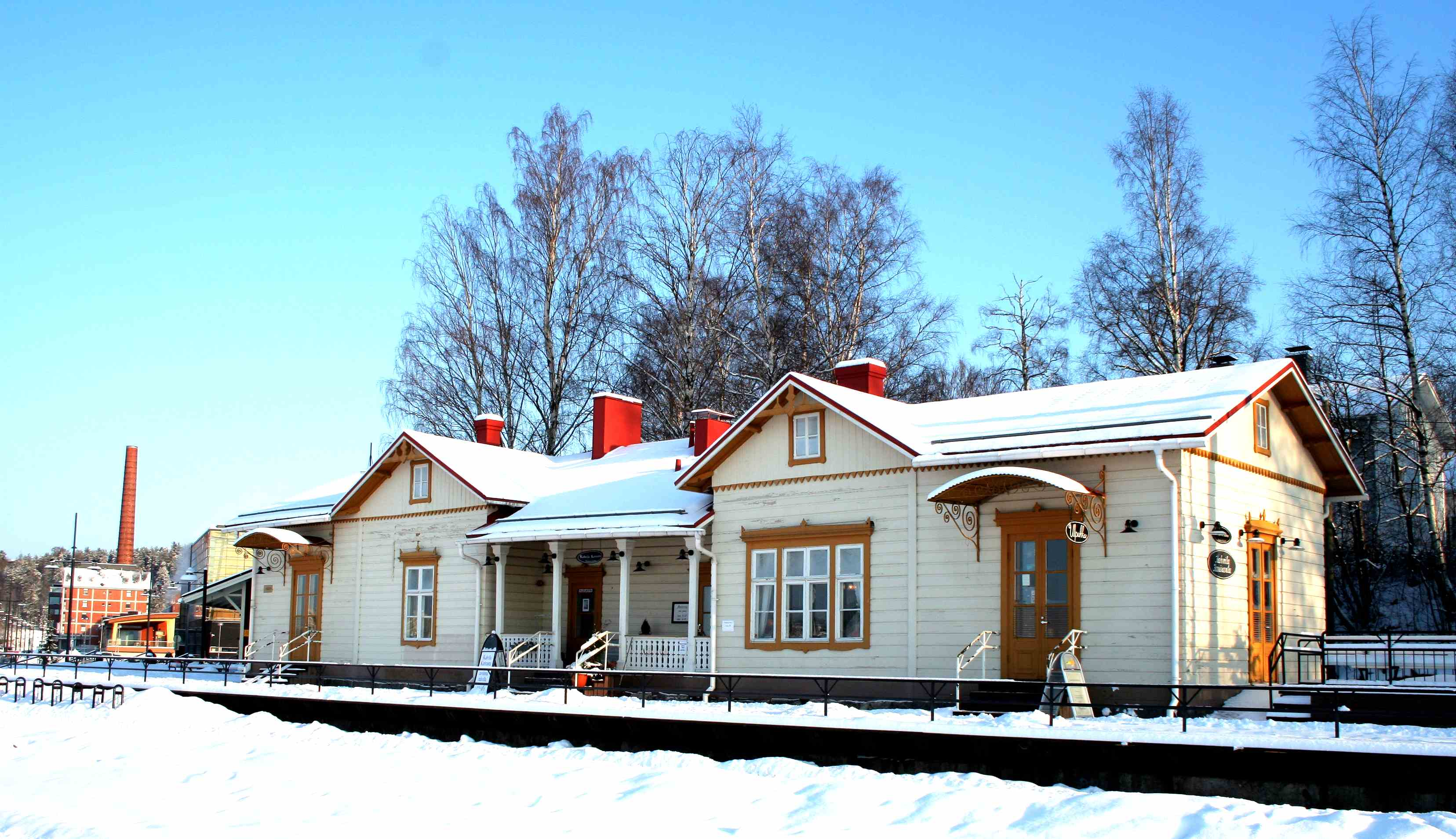

General information
- Location: Satamakatu 9, 15140; Kartano, Lahti; Finland
- Coordinates: 60°59′37″N 025°38′50″E
- System: Closed VR station
- Owner: Finnish Transport Infrastructure Agency
- Operator: VR Group

Construction
- Architect: Knut Nylander

Other information
- Station code: Vj

History
- Opened: 1 November 1869
- Closed: 1 March 1988
Location

The Vesijärvi railway station (Finnish: Vesijärven rautatieasema, Swedish: Vesijärvi järnvägsstation) is located in the city of Lahti, Finland, in the district of Kartano. It was one end of the port and industrial siding that branched off of the Riihimäki–Saint Petersburg railway, on the west side of the Lahti railway station.

== History ==
As the Riihimäki–Saint Petersburg railway reached Lahti in August 1869, a siding was built to connect the main railway to the shore of lake Vesijärvi, intertwining the railway and the waterborne traffic on the Päijänne. This was made possible not only by the siding, but also by the Vääksy canal being built in 1868-1871, which linked the two waterways together. As with the rest of the Riihimäki–Lahti section of the railway, transport on the Vesijärvi siding was initiated on 1 November 1869. Passenger transit was handled by local trains that passengers would exchange onto at Lahti, after which they could continue their journey toward Heinola or Jyväskylä by ship on the Päijänne.

The significance of freight transport on the siding grew quickly; in 1885, Vesijärvi was one of the busiest stations on the entire Riihimäki–St. Petersburg line in terms of cargo volume, being only second to the eastern terminus of the line, the Finland Station in Saint Petersburg. Industry in Lahti began to concentrate on the north side of the station; for example, the Lahden Höyrysaha sawmill was founded in 1870.

The decline of the line started in the post-war period. Passenger services were ceased in 1965, and freight services were entirely ceased in 1990, which prompted the disassembly of the line in 1994.

== Station building ==
The Vesijärvi station building, constructed according to stock plans from Knut Nylander for class IV stations, was completed by 1870. It was asymmetric in design and had a large open porch. It was expanded for the first time in 1895, making the design symmetric, and then again in 1917 by extending both of the building's outer ends. In 1998, the station was thoroughly renovated, and some older aspects of its design were restored.
