= Villähde railway station =

Railway station in Nastola, Finland

Villähde
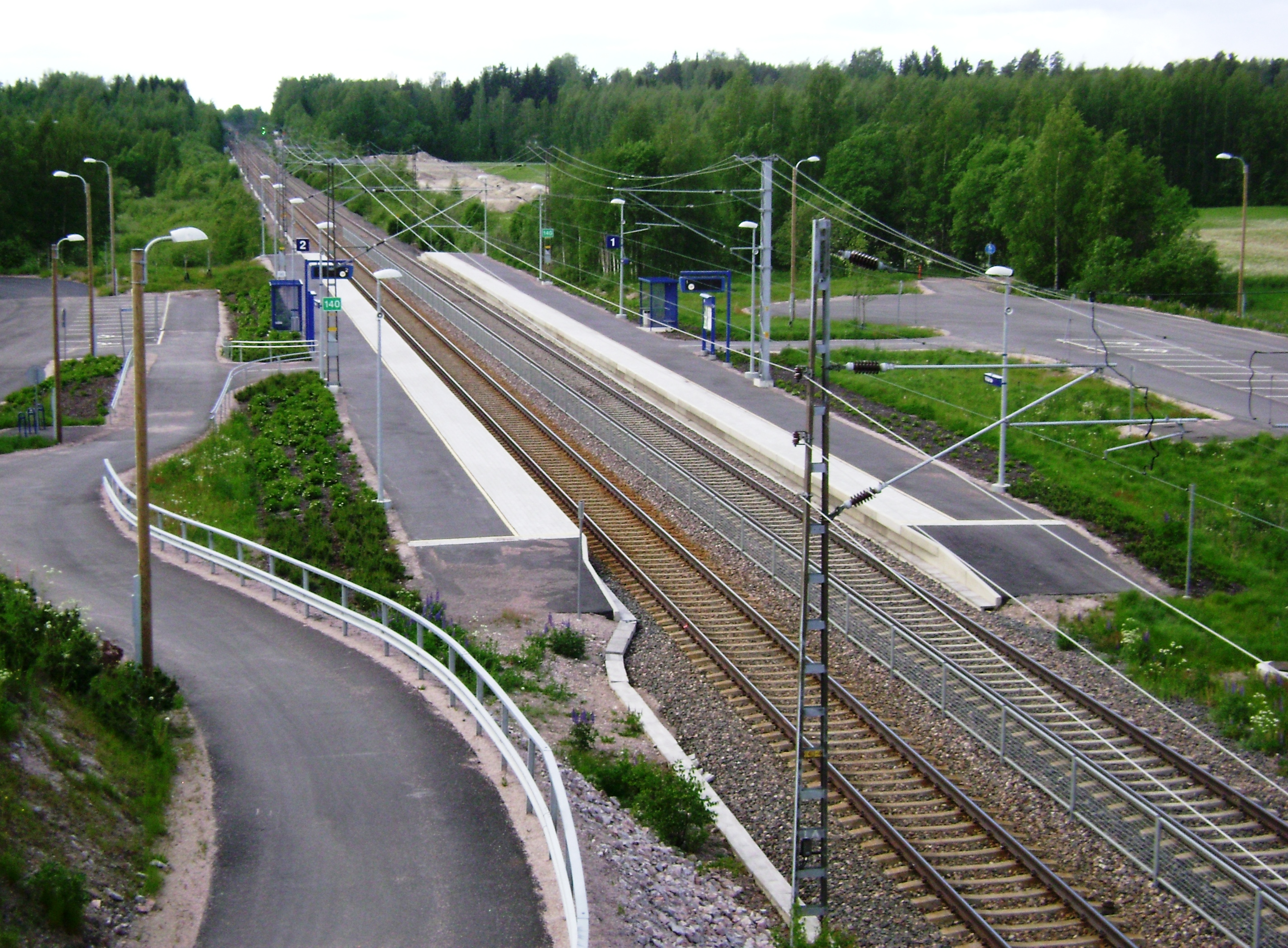

General information
- Location: Lastaustie 7, 15540; Villähde, Nastola; Finland
- Coordinates: 60°56.796′N 025°49.489′E
- System: VR station
- Owner: Finnish Transport Infrastructure Agency
- Operator: VR Group
- Line: Lahti–Kouvola
- Platforms: 2 side platforms
- Tracks: 2

Construction
- Parking: Yes
- Cycle facilities: Yes

Other information
- Station code: Vlh
- Classification: Operating point

Key dates
- 1888: Opened
- 1970: Closed to passenger traffic
- 17 September 2009: Re-opened

Passengers
- 2016: 5,000

Services
Preceding station	VR Group	Following station
Lahti Terminus	Lahti–Kouvola	Nastola towards Kouvola
Preceding station	VR commuter rail	Following station
Lahti towards Helsinki	Z	Nastola towards Kouvola
Lahti Terminus	O	Nastola towards Kotkan satama
Location

The Villähde railway station (Finnish: Villähteen rautatieasema, Swedish: Villähde järnvägsstation) is located in the city of Lahti (formerly the municipality of Nastola), Finland, in the district of Villähde. It is located along the Lahti–Kouvola line, and its neighboring stations are Lahti in the west and Nastola in the east.

== History ==
=== 1st station ===
In 1870, the owner of the Ersta Manor, Werner Wessner, expressed his interest in founding a station in Villähde to assist the nearby large estates in getting their goods on the market. The proposal was not accepted at this time; the matter was brought back up by Wessner as well as the locals of the western parts of the parish of Nastola, this time meeting success. The site of the station was not seen as optimal to serve the Ersta Manor, but it was also located in a convenient location at a crossing between the local roads to Heinola and Orimattila. Wessner donated the lands surrounding the future station to the state, and the station of Villähde was opened in the year 1888. The Class V station building was completed in the same year, and it was accompanied by a warehouse and two residential buildings. The station was originally founded under the name Villähti; the name was changed to Villähde in 1938.

After the second World War, a car chassis factory as well as a furniture workshop were founded in Villähde. However, upon the foundation of the Lankila and Haravakylä halts (in 1940 and 1945, respectively), the number of passengers at Villähde began to dwindle due to the locations of the halts better serving the population centers in the region. Despite the urban area of Villähde reaching a total population of 1,300 residents by 1970, the station was closed from passengers in the same year and was made unstaffed in 1971. Its railyard was disassembled in 1995, and therefore the first operating point of Villähde was closed.

=== 2nd station ===
Villähde was reopened in 2009 as a crossover point. After the passenger services of the Nastola area were transferred from Uusikylä to the new Nastola halt in the centre of the municipality in 2005, the municipal council and its residents started once again an initiative to build a station in Villähde. Both stations were subsequently rebuilt and reopened in 2010, which made Nastola home to a total of three active railway stations.

== Services ==
Villähde is served by all O trains on the route Lahti–Kouvola–Kotka Port.

The intermediate stations between Lahti and Kouvola are also served by all but one Z rush hour service on the route Helsinki–Lahti–Kouvola.

== Departure tracks ==
Villähde has two platform tracks.

- Track 1 is used by Z trains to Helsinki and O trains to Lahti.
- Track 2 is used by Z trains to Kouvola and O trains to Kouvola/Kotka Port.
