= Nastola railway station =

Railway station in Lahti, Finland

Nastola
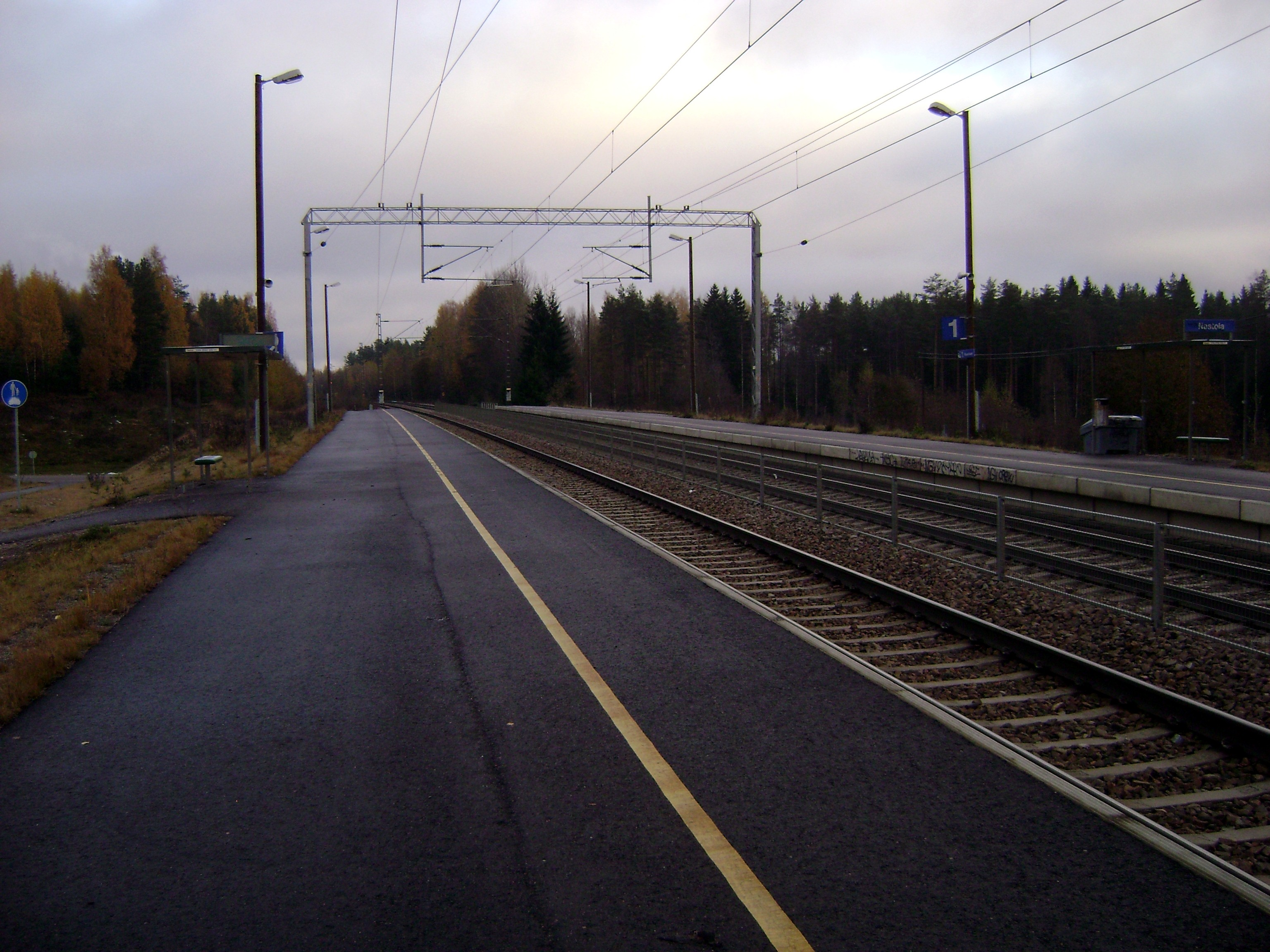

General information
- Location: Pysäkinkuja 10, 15560; Nastola, Lahti; Finland
- Coordinates: 60°56′09″N 025°56′06″E
- System: VR station
- Owner: Finnish Transport Infrastructure Agency
- Line: Lahti–Kouvola railway
- Platforms: 2 side platforms
- Tracks: 2

Construction
- Structure type: Ground station
- Parking: Yes
- Cycle facilities: Yes

Other information
- Station code: Nsl

History
- Opened: 2005

Passengers
- 2016: 8,000

Services
Preceding station	VR Group	Following station
Villähde towards Lahti	Lahti–Kouvola	Uusikylä towards Kouvola
Preceding station	VR commuter rail	Following station
Villähde towards Helsinki	Z	Uusikylä towards Kouvola
Villähde towards Lahti	O	Uusikylä towards Kotkan satama
Location

The Nastola railway station (Finnish: Nastolan rautatieasema, Swedish language: Nastola järnvägsstation) is located in the city of Lahti (formerly the municipality of Nastola) in the Päijät-Häme region, in Finland. The station is located in the centre of the urban area of Nastola, and the distance from the Lahti railway station is 15.7 kilometres and that from the Kausala railway station is 23.6 kilometres.

== History ==
=== As a halt (1904–1905) ===
After the opening of the Villähde in 1888, the area of the municipality of Nastola had two stations on the Riihimäki–Saint Petersburg railway, with Uusikylä being one of the original ones of the line. In 1904, representatives from the municipality made an appeal to the Railway Administration concerning the possibility of founding a halt in the parish village. As the municipality did not necessarily see the new halt as economically justified for the State Railways, it pledged to back private parties in constructing and maintaining the halt, should the municipality be given permission to do so. The Nastola halt was opened in 1905, approximately 1.5 kilometres (0.93 mi) away from the Nastola church.

=== Increasing services (1906–1950) ===
In December 1906, the municipality made another appeal to the Railway Administration, this time concerning the promotion of the halt to a pysäkki. Local salesman K. Kilpeläinen was chosen to push the cause, providing several reasons for the need to promote the halt:

- The municipality already had possession of land around the halt, thus circumventing an expensive and long land acquisition process.
- The passenger numbers at the halt were considerable in spite of only two trains stopping there on request daily; it was believed that they could increase further given proper services and accommodation for passengers.
- A yarn factory was being built in the parish village at the time, providing a potential customer for cargo services at the pysäkki.
- The station could have served the residents of Heinola as well, as the road between Ruuhijärvi and Vierumäki had recently been rebuilt.

In spite of these reasons, the appeal was not accepted by the Railway Administration at the time, which cited a low amount of potential traffic as a reason. However, as ticket sales services were initiated in Nastola in 1926, the overall amount of trips made from the area of the municipality increased. This was in spite of the halt only selling class II and III tickets to Lahti and Kouvola, as well as Helsinki. In the interwar period, freight services were initiated in Nastola, as the halt was promoted to the status of a laiturivaihde – a halt with a rail yard containing at least one switch.

=== Decline and reopening (1950–) ===
The industrial area in Nastola was built in the post-war period, and numerous larger companies began relocating there in the 1960s. The industrial zone was served by a siding stretching from the laiturivaihde in Nastola to the Uusikylä station. Passenger services in Nastola ceased in 1970, and it was made an unstaffed operating point in the following year.

The Nastola stop was rebuilt in 2005 in an effort to move the passenger traffic role of the Uusikylä station to a location that would better serve the majority of the population of the municipality. As of 2010, with the reopenings of Uusikylä and Villähde, the Nastola area is home to three active railway stations.

== Services ==
Nastola is served by all O trains on the route Lahti–Kouvola–Kotka Port.

The intermediate stations between Lahti and Kouvola are also served by all but one Z rush hour service on the route Helsinki–Lahti–Kouvola. The station does not have ticket sale services nor a VR ticket vending machine, though it does have 55 centimetres (22 in) high platforms, allowing accessible entry to low-floor trains.

== Departure tracks ==
Nastola has two platform tracks.

- Track 1 is used by Z trains to Helsinki and O trains to Lahti.
- Track 2 is used by Z trains to Kouvola and O trains to Kouvola/Kotka Port.
