= Uusikylä railway station =

Railway station in Lahti, Finland

Uusikylä
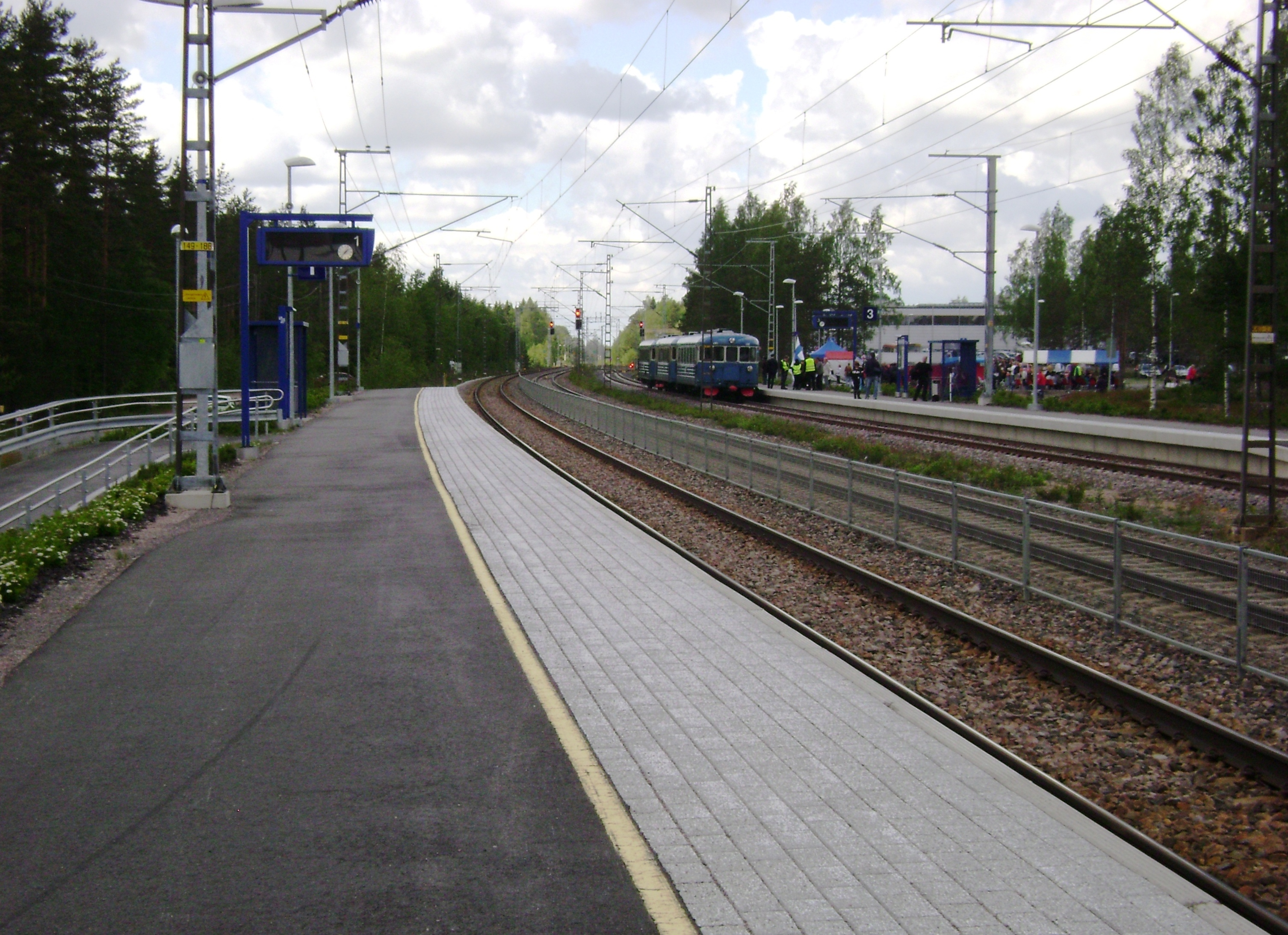

General information
- Location: Kouvolantie 519, 15550; Uusikylä, Lahti; Finland
- Coordinates: 60°55′40″N 026°00′56″E
- System: VR station
- Owner: Finnish Transport Infrastructure Agency
- Operator: VR Group
- Line: Lahti–Kouvola railway
- Platforms: 2 side platforms
- Tracks: 3

Other information
- Station code: Ukä
- Classification: Operating point

History
- Opened: 11 September 1870

Passengers
- 2016: 10,000

Services
| Preceding station | VR Group | Following station |
|---|---|---|
| Nastola towards Lahti | Lahti–Kouvola | Kausala towards Kouvola |
| Preceding station | VR commuter rail | Following station |
| Nastola towards Helsinki | Z | Kausala towards Kouvola |
| Nastola towards Lahti | O | Kausala towards Kotkan satama |
Location

The Uusikylä railway station (Finnish: Uudenkylän rautatieasema, Swedish: Uusikylä järnvägsstation; formerly Nyby) is located in the city of Lahti (formerly the municipality of Nastola), Finland, in the district of Uusikylä. It is located along the Lahti–Kouvola line, and its neighboring stations are Nastola in the west and Kausala in the east.

== History ==
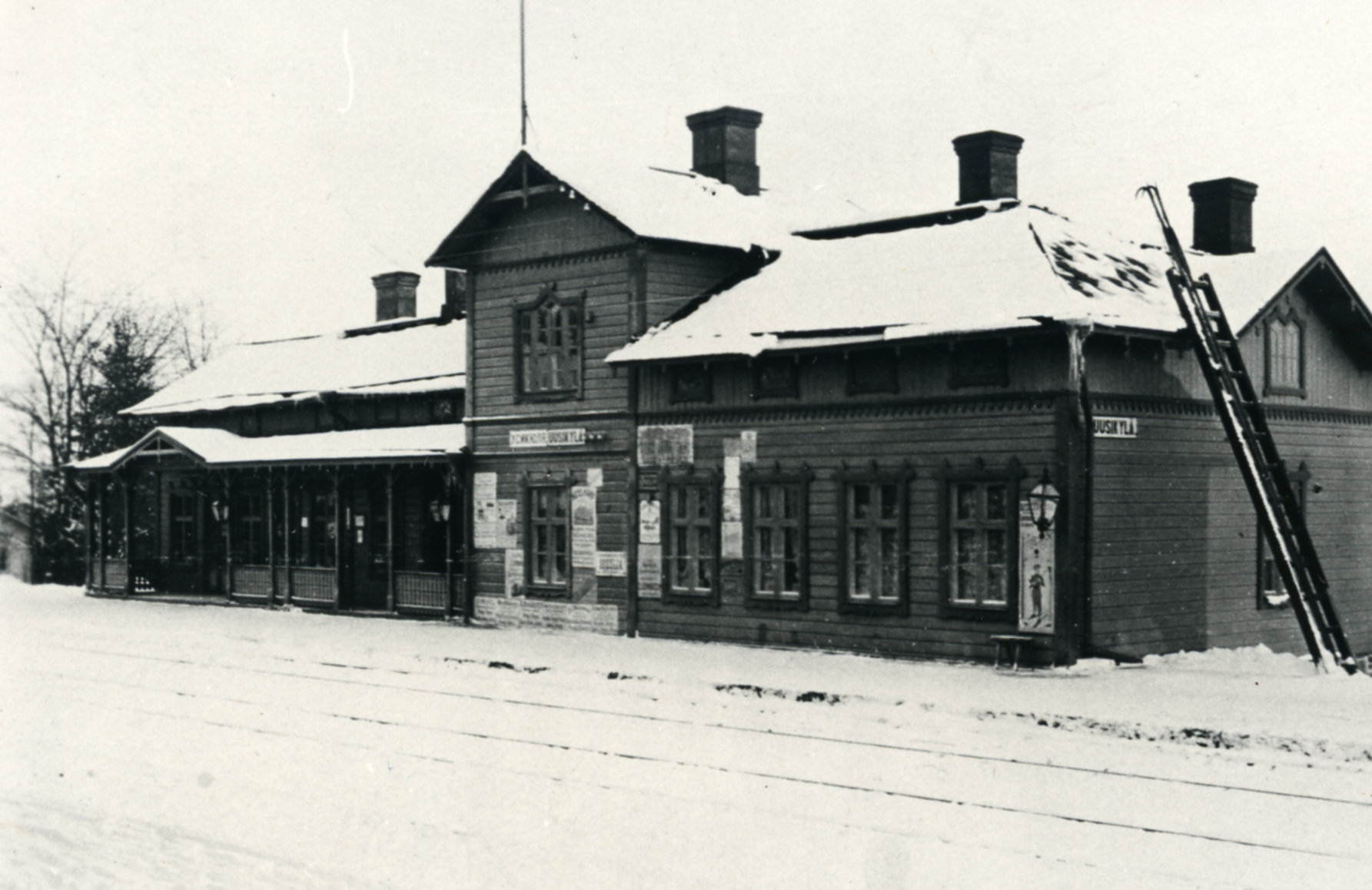
Uusikylä in 1910

Uusikylä is one of the original stations of the intermediate stations of the Lahti–Kouvola section of the Riihimäki–Saint Petersburg railway. At the time of the railway's opening, Uusikylä became the only station situated in the parish of Nastola; the location was chosen for the village's important location in a crossroads between Lahti, Heinola, Anjala and Artjärvi. It became an important freight station on the line; one of the notable types of cargo transported included milk that was bound for Saint Petersburg.

During the Finnish Civil War, upon the landing of Detachment Brandenstein in Loviisa, it proceeded towards Uusikylä and took control of the station, destroying a section of the railway in the process and thus cutting off the Reds' connection to St. Petersburg. The lives of the Germans who fell during these battles are honored by a memorial at the station. Uusikylä became the target of Soviet artillery just three days before the end of the Winter War, on 10 March 1940. There were no deaths, in spite of the idle trains that were then present at the station holding approximately 1,000 people at the time. The station management office as well as that of the post service were then temporarily transferred into a nearby bakery until the completion of the new station building in the same year.

Over the period of heavy industrialization in Nastola, the Uusikylä station was expanded to accommodate the increased demand for freight transport by local companies. Additional warehouses were built starting from the late 1970s, and sidings were built, some of which are still in use and were subject to renovation in 2020, with old wooden sleepers being removed in favour of concrete ones. Passenger services at Uusikylä were ceased in 1971; however, they were restarted upon the electrification of the Lahti–Kouvola section in 1979. In an effort to move the passenger traffic role of the Uusikylä station to a location that would better serve the majority of the population of the municipality of Nastola, it was again closed on 9 January 2005 with the opening of the Nastola halt. The station's platforms were then dismantled on 10-11 May.

Uusikylä, along with Villähde, were subsequently rebuilt and reopened on 12 December 2010, which made Nastola home to a total of three active railway stations. The platforms of the new station were placed approximately 1.2 kilometres (0.75 mi) further west compared to the old ones, in the approximate location of the Kanerva halt that was in use in 1954-1969.

== Station building and premises ==
Its original Class III station building was built according to plans from Knut Nylander, and was completed in 1869. The premises of the station also included a freight warehouse, outhouse, guard's cabin as well as a water tower for maintenance of steam locomotives. The station building was completely destroyed by the fire bombings in March 1940, and was replaced by a new one later in the same year. It is representative of the simple architectural principles of stations from the wartime era with its rectangular shape. A small warehouse is directly connected to the main station building via one of its walls. Save for this warehouse, the building originally had a light plasterwork on its outer surface, but it was later entirely covered with painted wooden boards.

== Services ==
Uusikylä is served by all O trains on the route Lahti–Kouvola–Kotka Port.

The intermediate stations between Lahti and Kouvola are also served by all but one Z rush hour service on the route Helsinki–Lahti–Kouvola.

== Departure tracks ==
Uusikylä has three tracks, of which two (1, 3) have platforms for passenger trains. Track 2 is used by long-distance trains that skip the station.

- Track 1 is used by Z trains to Kouvola and O trains to Kouvola/Kotka Port.
- Track 3 is used by Z trains to Helsinki and O trains to Lahti.

== Gallery ==
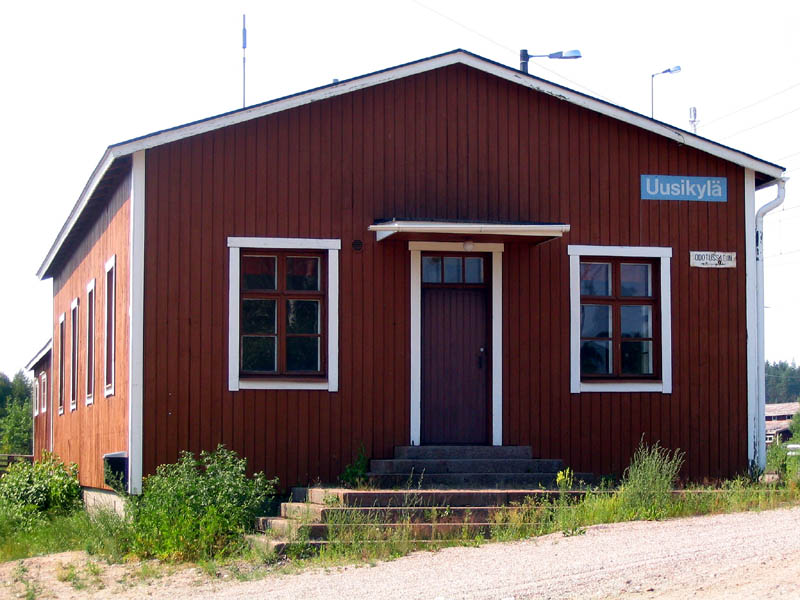
The second station building, constructed in 1940

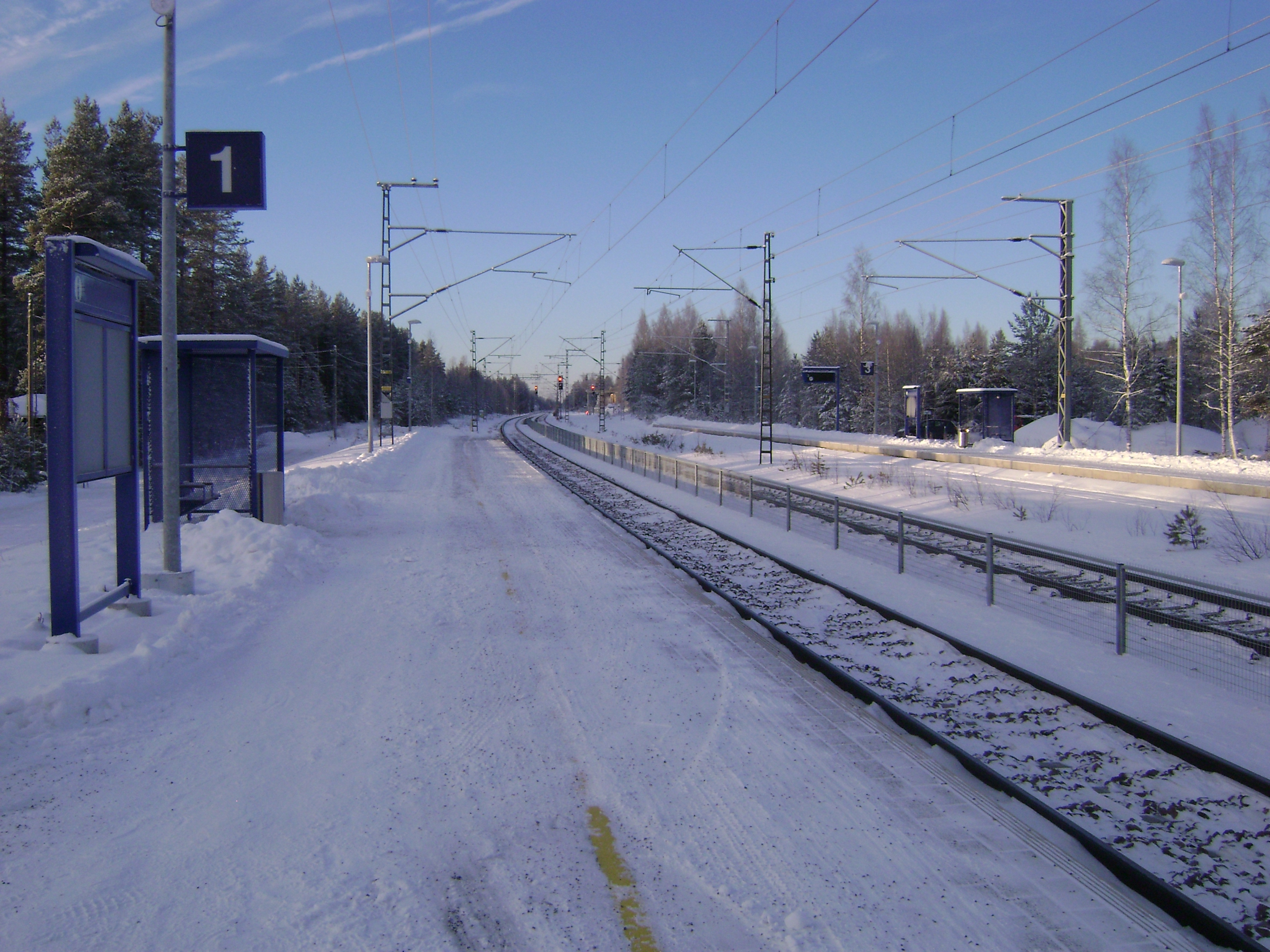
A snowy Uusikylä in December 2010
