= Inkeroinen railway station =

Railway station in Kouvola, Finland

Inkeroinen
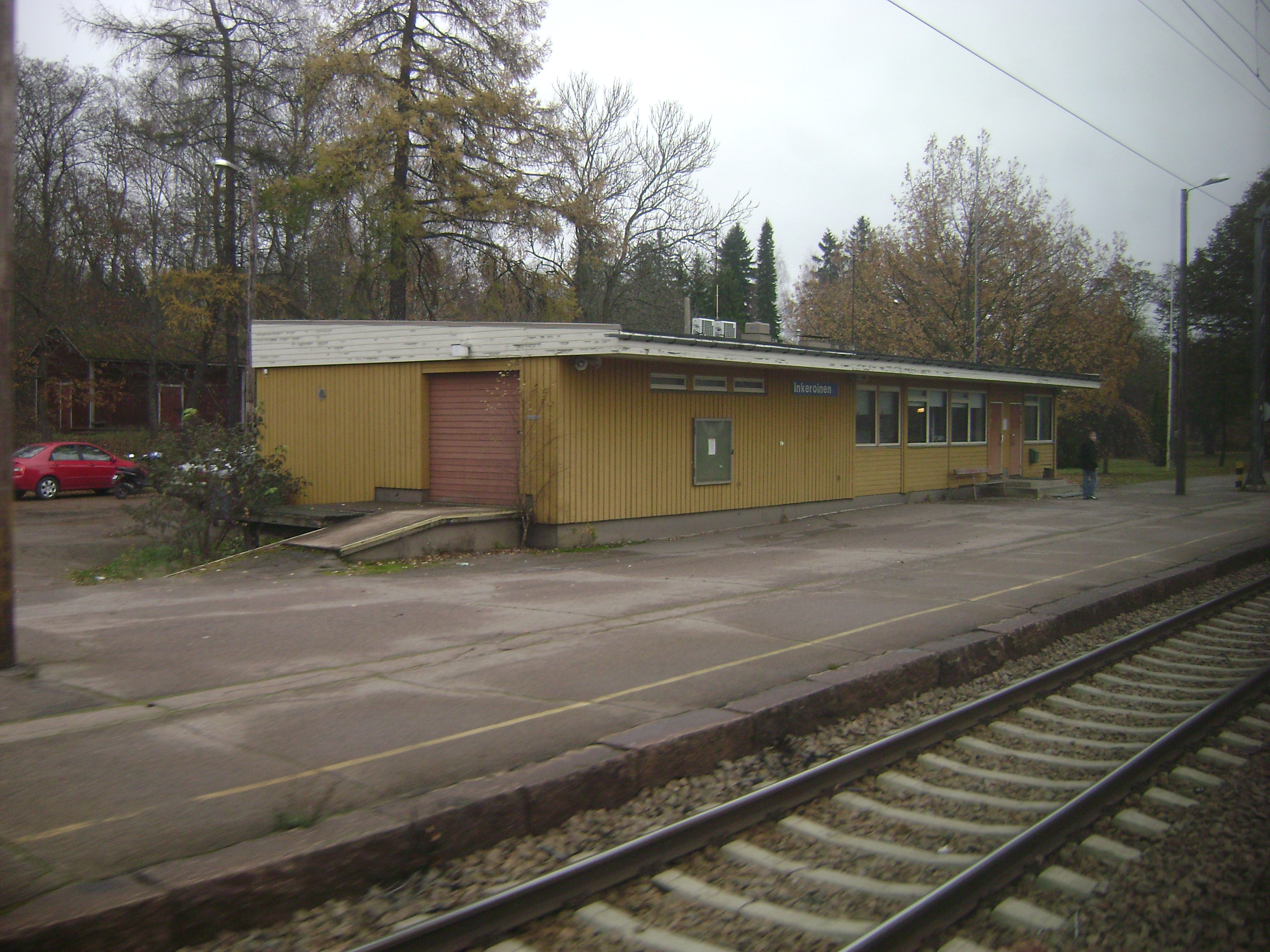

General information
- Location: Asematie 8, 46900; Inkeroinen, Kouvola; Finland
- Coordinates: 60°41.81′N 026°50.37′E
- System: VR station
- Owner: Finnish Transport Infrastructure Agency
- Operator: VR Group
- Platforms: 1 side platform 1 island platform
- Tracks: 3 (with platforms); Several private sidings

Other information
- Station code: Ikr
- Classification: Operating point

History
- Opened: 1 October 1890
- Former names: Inkeroinen/Inkerois (until May 1897)

Passengers
- 2008: 16,000

Services
Preceding station	VR commuter rail	Following station
Myllykoski towards Lahti or Kouvola	O	Tavastila towards Kotkan satama
Location
- Location within Kymenlaakso Location within Finland

The Inkeroinen railway station (Finnish: Inkeroisten rautatieasema, Swedish: Inkeroinen järnvägsstation, formerly Inkerois) is located in the town of Kouvola (formerly the town of Anjalankoski), Finland, in the urban area of Inkeroinen. It is located along the Kouvola–Kotka railway, and its neighboring stations are Myllykoski in the north and Tavastila in the south.

== Services ==
Inkeroinen is served by VR commuter rail O on the route Kouvola–Kotka Port; some of these services are operated from or continue towards Lahti as well.

== Departure tracks ==
Inkeroinen railway station has three platform tracks. Track 3 is normally unused by passenger trains that stop at the station.

- Track 1 is used by O trains to Kouvola/Lahti.
- Track 2 is used by O trains to Kotka Port.
