= Kausala railway station =

Railway station in Iitti, Finland

Kausala
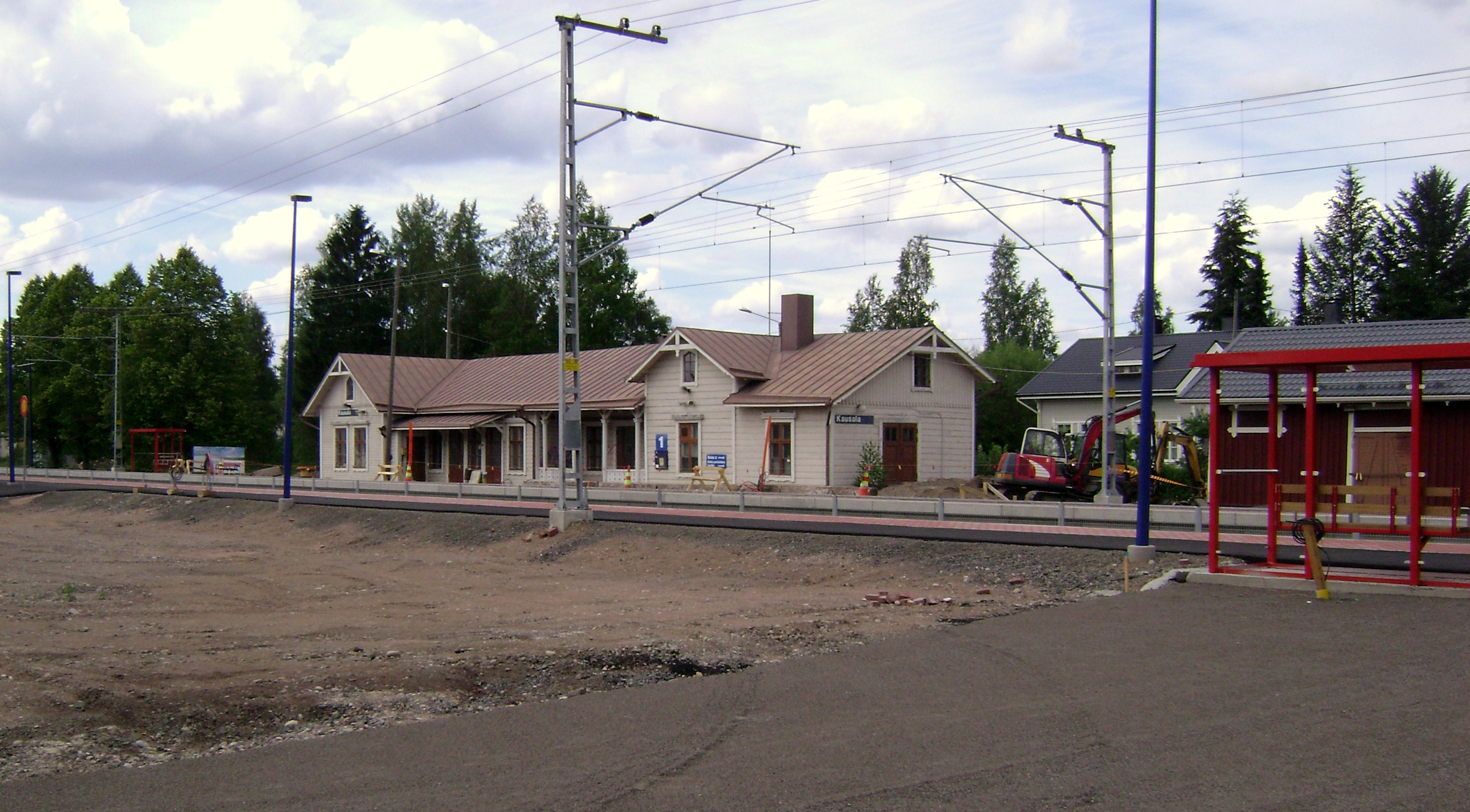

General information
- Location: Asemantie 12, 47400; Kausala, Iitti; Finland
- Coordinates: 60°53′07″N 026°19′49″E
- System: VR station
- Owner: Finnish Transport Infrastructure Agency
- Operator: VR Group
- Line: Lahti–Kouvola railway
- Platforms: 2 side platforms
- Tracks: 2

Construction
- Architect: Knut Nylander

Other information
- Station code: Ka
- Classification: Halt

History
- Opened: 11 September 1870

Passengers
- 2008: 31,000

Services
Preceding station	VR Group	Following station
Uusikylä towards Lahti	Lahti–Kouvola	Koria towards Kouvola
Preceding station	VR commuter rail	Following station
Uusikylä towards Helsinki	Z	Koria towards Kouvola
Uusikylä towards Lahti	O	Koria towards Kotkan satama
Location

The Kausala railway station (Finnish: Kausalan rautatieasema, Swedish: Kausala järnvägsstation) is located in the municipality of Iitti, Finland, in the urban area and municipal seat of Kausala. It is located along the Lahti–Kouvola railway, and its neighboring stations are Uusikylä in the west and Koria in the east.

== Services ==
Kausala is served by all O trains on the route Lahti–Kouvola–Kotka Port.

The intermediate stations between Lahti and Kouvola are also served by all but one Z rush hour service on the route Helsinki–Lahti–Kouvola.

== Departure tracks ==
Kausala has two platform tracks.

- Track 1 is used by Z trains to Helsinki and O trains to Lahti.
- Track 2 is used by Z trains to Kouvola and O trains to Kouvola/Kotka Port.
