= Myllykoski railway station =

Railway station in Kouvola, Finland

Myllykoski
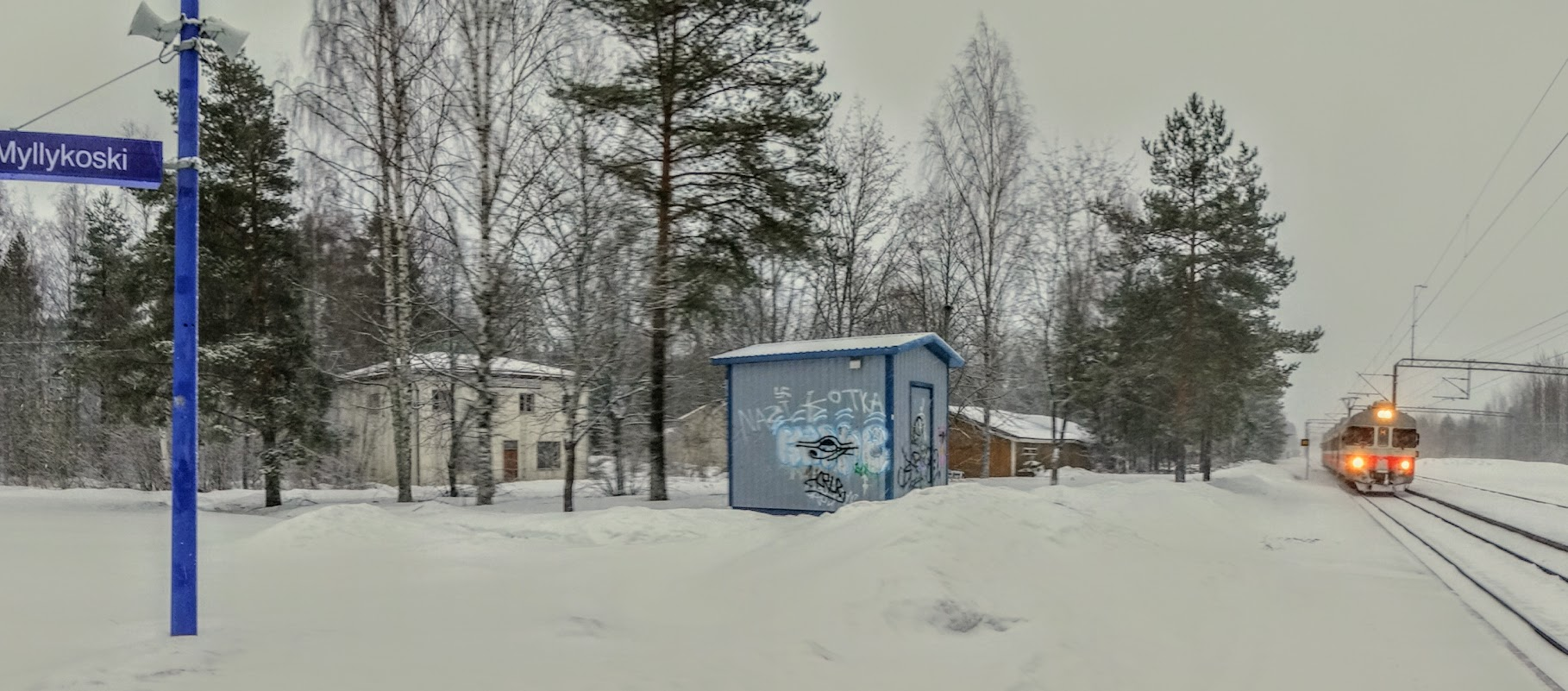

General information
- Location: Itäasemantie 15, 46800; Myllykoski, Kouvola; Finland
- Coordinates: 60°46′12″N 026°47′18″E
- System: VR station
- Owner: Finnish Transport Infrastructure Agency
- Operator: VR Group
- Line: Kouvola–Kotka
- Platforms: 2 side platforms
- Tracks: 2

Other information
- Station code: Mki
- Classification: Halt

History
- Opened: 1 October 1890

Passengers
- 2008: 20,000

Services
Preceding station	VR commuter rail	Following station
Kouvola towards Lahti or Kouvola	O	Inkeroinen towards Kotkan satama
Location
- Location within Kymenlaakso Location within Finland

The Myllykoski railway station (Finnish: Myllykosken rautatieasema, Swedish: Myllykoski järnvägsstation) is located in the town of Kouvola (formerly the municipality of Anjalankoski), Finland, in the urban area of Myllykoski. It is located along the Kouvola–Kotka railway, and its neighboring stations are Kouvola in the north and Inkeroinen in the south.

== Services ==
Myllykoski is served by VR commuter rail O trains on the route Kouvola–Kotka Port; some of these services are operated from or continue towards Lahti as well.

== Departure tracks ==
Myllykoski railway station has two tracks with a platform.

- Track 1 is used by O trains to Kouvola/Lahti.
- Track 2 is used by O trains to Kotka Port.
