= Koria railway station =

Railway station in Kouvola, Finland

Koria
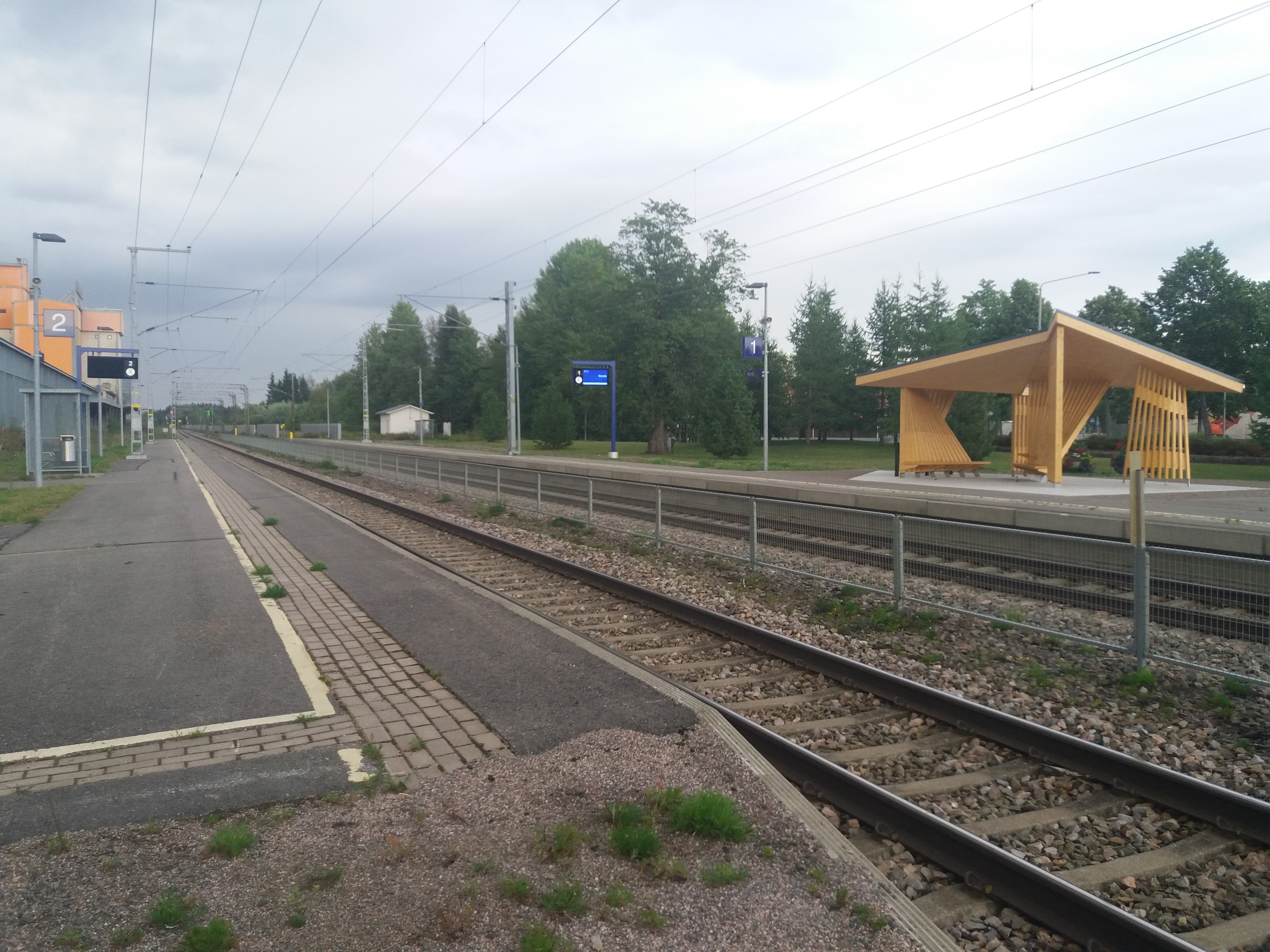

General information
- Location: Elimäentie 2, 45610; Koria, Kouvola; Finland
- Coordinates: 60.84724°N 026.6019°E
- System: VR station
- Owner: Finnish Transport Infrastructure Agency
- Operator: VR Group
- Line: Lahti–Kouvola
- Platforms: 2 side platforms
- Tracks: 2

Other information
- Station code: Kra
- Classification: Halt

History
- Opened: 9 November 1870
- Former names: Kymi/Kymmene (until May 1897)

Passengers
- 2008: 7,000

Services
Preceding station	VR Group	Following station
Kausala towards Lahti	Lahti–Kouvola	Kouvola Terminus
Preceding station	VR commuter rail	Following station
Kausala towards Helsinki	Z	Kouvola Terminus
Kausala towards Lahti	O	Kouvola towards Kotkan satama
Location
- Location within Kymenlaakso Location within Finland

The Koria railway station (Finnish: Korian rautatieasema, Swedish: Koria järnvägsstation) is located in the town of Kouvola, Finland, in the urban area and district of Koria. It is located along the Lahti–Kouvola railway, and its neighboring stations are Kausala in the west and Kouvola in the east.

== Services ==
Koria is served by all and O trains on the route Lahti–Kouvola–Kotka Port.

The intermediate stations between Lahti and Kouvola are also served by all but one Z rush hour service on the route Helsinki–Lahti–Kouvola. Eastbound trains towards Kouvola and Kotka use track 1 and westbound trains towards Lahti and Helsinki stop at track 2.

== Departure tracks ==
Koria has two platform tracks.

- Track 1 is used by Z trains to Kouvola and O trains to Kouvola/Kotka Port.
- Track 2 is used by Z trains to Helsinki and O trains to Lahti.
