= Uusikylä =

Uusikylä may refer to:

- Uusikylä, Lahti, Finland
- Uusikylä, Tampere, Finland
