= Kouvola–Kotka railway =

Railway line in Finland

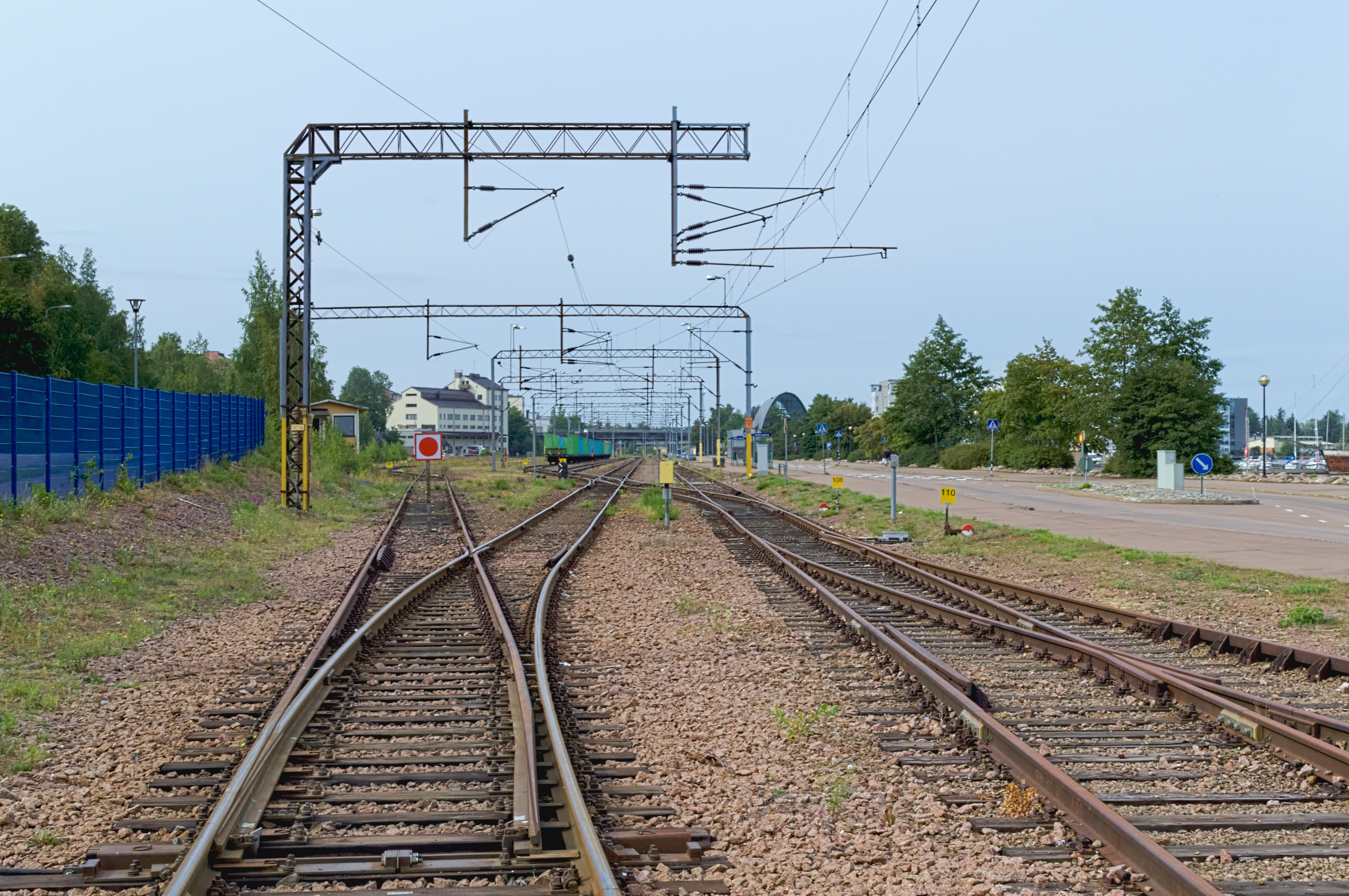

Overview
- Status: Open
- Owner: Finnish government
- Locale: Kymenlaakso
- Termini: Kouvola; Kotka Harbour

Service
- Operator(s): VR Group

History
- Opened: 1 October 1890

Technical
- Line length: 52 km (32 mi)
- Number of tracks: 2 (Kouvola-Juurikorpi); 1 (Juurikorpi-Kotka)
- Track gauge: 1,524 mm (5 ft)
- Loading gauge: 1,524 mm
- Electrification: 25 kV / 50 Hz
- Operating speed: 120 km/h (75 mph)

The Kouvola–Kotka railway (Finnish: Kouvola–Kotka-rata, Swedish: Kouvola–Kotka-banan), also called the Kotka railway (Finnish: Kotkan rata, Swedish: Kotkabanan) is a 1,524 mm (5 ft) railway in Finland, connecting the towns of Kouvola and Kotka in the region of Kymenlaakso.

== History ==
Kotka had begun growing into an industrial community from the 1850s. As the Kotka fortresses had been destroyed during the Crimean War and the islands of Kotkansaari and Hovinsaari fell out of military use, the Finnish state offered to lease out plots on the former for industrial use in 1868. The first industrial plot was awarded to Carl Henrik Ahlquist of Hamina, and the sawmill he constructed in collaboration with Hackman & Co started operations in 1871, marking the beginning of industrialization in Kotka.

Talks regarding the construction of a branch of the Riihimäki–Saint Petersburg railway to southern Kymenlaakso sprung up soon after the former's inauguration in September 1870. The first mayor of the town of Kotka, Oskar Backmann, proposed in 1880 the building of a railway to Kotka to ease the logistical issues between the town's harbour and inland Finland, while the Diet of Finland debated the construction of a railway to Hillo or Nuottaniemi in Hamina. While the two port towns and their railway plans competed against each other, the consensus initially was that the branch was to begin from Kaipiainen in Valkeala, as it was also planned to be the starting point of the Savonia railway to Kuopio. Later on, however, Taavetti and Kouvola also became candidates for the southern terminus, and during its session in March 1887, the Diet made the decision to build the railway from Kouvola to Kuopio.

Kotka started to overtake Hamina as the residential and economic center of southern Kymenlaakso starting from the 1870s. By 1882, the Kotka option had gained the backing of the Railway Committees of both the Diet and Senate of Finland, and during the 1888 session of the Diet, the decision to build the Kouvola–Kotka railway was made; it was opened for provisional traffic with celebrations in the summer of 1890, and was officially inaugurated in the fall.

The double track section from Inkeroinen to Juurikorpi was opened for traffic on 29 October 1996. The project also included the replacement of the two last remaining level crossings on the section of track with overpasses.

== Overview ==
The Kouvola–Kotka railway stretches approximately 52 kilometres (32 mi) long; it is fully electrified, and consists of two tracks on the 36 kilometres (22 mi) section from Kouvola to Juurikorpi and one track for 16 kilometres (9.9 mi) from Juurikorpi to the Kotka harbour.

Two freight-only lines branch off from the Kotka line: the Hamina railway splits off in Juurikorpi, while the private Karhula–Sunila siding begins in Kymi.

== Services ==
VR Group operates the O commuter rail service on the route Kouvola–Kotka Harbour; several of these services are operated from or proceed towards Lahti as well. On the Kouvola–Kotka line, these services call in Myllykoski, Inkeroinen, Tavastila, Kymi, Kyminlinna, Paimenportti and Kotka.
