= Ville Väinölä =

Finnish ice hockey player (born 1996)

- Born: 9 January 1996 (age 29); Nastola, Finland
- Height: 6 ft 2 in (188 cm)
- Weight: 187 lb (85 kg; 13 st 5 lb)
- Position: Defence
- Shoots: Left
- Mestis team Former teams: RoKi; Pelicans
- NHL draft: Undrafted
- Playing career: 2014–present

Ville Väinölä (born 9 January 1996) is a Finnish ice hockey defenceman. He is currently playing with RoKi in the Finnish Mestis.

Väinölä played seven games in the Liiga with Pelicans during the 2014–15 Liiga season.
