= Eduard Polón =

Finnish entrepreneur and founder of Nokia

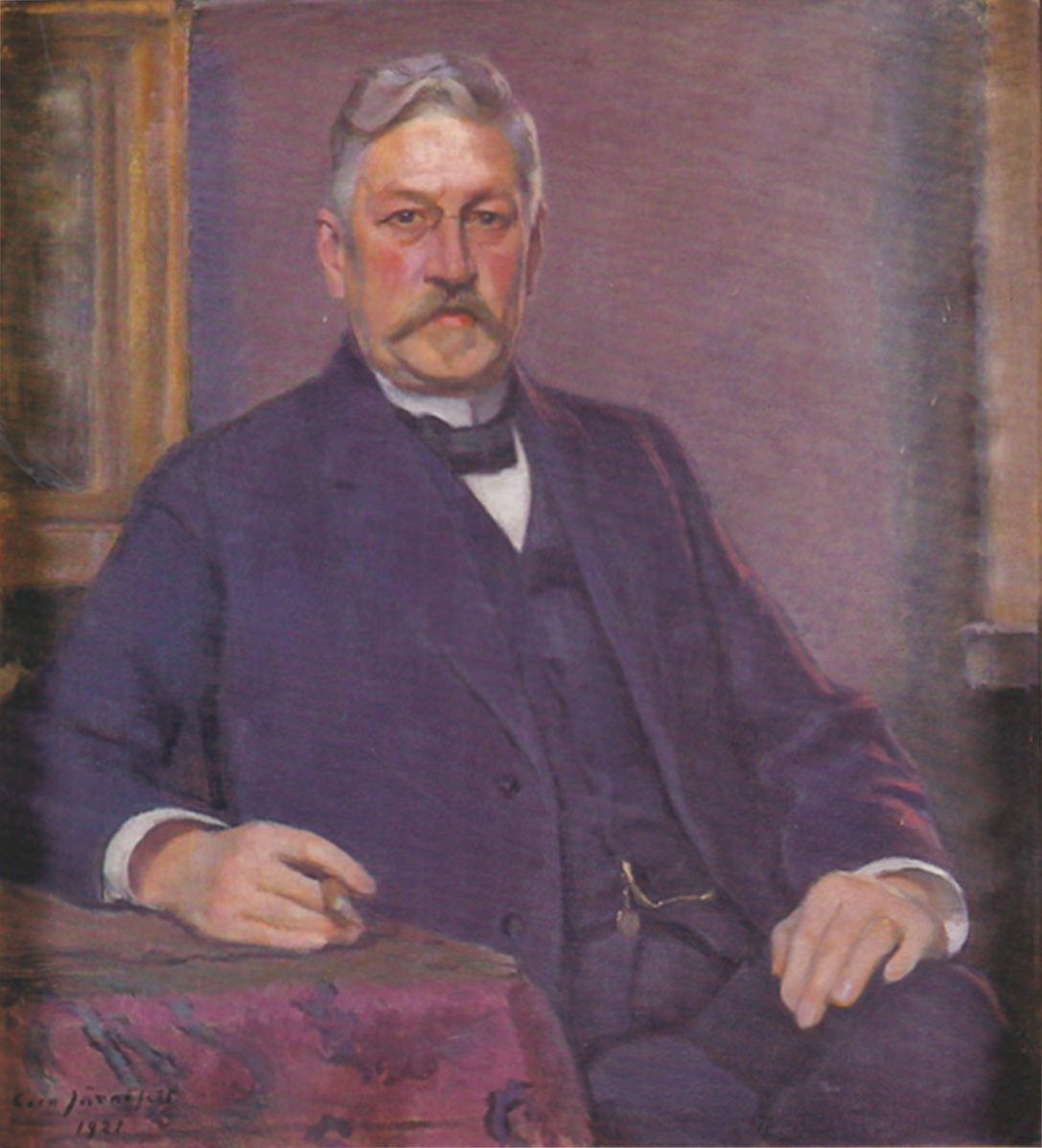
- A portrait of Eduard Polón painted by artist Eero Järnefelt
- Born: Ulrik Wilhelm Eduard Polón; 16 June 1861; Nastola
- Died: 30 September 1930 (aged 69); Helsinki
- Organization: Kagal
- Known for: Founder of Nokia
- Title: Founder and CEO of Nokia
- Movement: Resistance against Russification of Finland
- Spouse: Edith Polón
- Parents: Ulrik Polón (father); Thérèse Strömm (mother)

Ulrik Wilhelm Eduard Polón (16 June 1861 – 30 September 1930) was a Finnish business leader and a political patriot during the country's years of oppression. Under his leadership, a rubber industry was launched in the country. He was the founder, CEO, chairman of the board and majority shareholder of Suomen Kumitehdas Oy or the Finnish Rubber Company. His group also designed and introduced a modern timber and cable market in Finland. His interests were eventually known as the Nokia group.

Polón opposed the Russification of Finland during the periods of oppression and was active in leading the resistance organization Kagal. He was a representative of the bourgeois estate in the parliament from 1905 to 1906. His involvement in the resistance caused him to be deported to Russia in 1916–1917.

== Youth ==
Polón was born in Nastola in 1861 to Ulrik Polón and Thérèse Strömm. He was of Polish descent. He studied at a Swedish lyceum in Porvoo, becoming friends with his classmate, Werner Söderström, a bookseller who introduced him to a model of a money-making business when he established a publishing house. Polón helped him create a network of agents.

== Entrepreneurship ==
In 1898, Polón participated in the founding of the rubber company Suomen Kumitehdas and became the company's deputy manager the following year. He served as CEO from 1900 to 1929 and from 1921 he was chairman of the board. It was decided to transfer the plant to the city of Nokia in 1904. Initially, the company faced major financial difficulties. As a result, a number of board members, led by Karl Alfred Paloheimo, wanted to oust Polón as CEO. Polón settled the dispute by buying the shares of Paloheimo and his other opponents and in 1915 became the company's majority shareholder.

Thanks to the assets he acquired during the First World War, Polón created a group around Suomen Kumitehdas, which is now called Nokia Corporation. In 1918, Polón first acquired Nokia Ab, a wood processing and power generation company founded by Fredrik Idestam in the 1860s. In 1922, Suomen Kumitehdas, the rubber company, bought Suomen Kaapelitehdas, the Finnish Cable Works, founded by Arvid Wikström in 1912. The 1920s turned out to be a fruitful period of economic success for the Polón Group. Polón increased his prestige by making various donations for the benefit of the workers. This, however, did not prevent the company from drifting into serious labor difficulties in the late 1920s.

Polón decided to name the company Nokia, the name of the town where the factories were based, in order to differentiate their products from Russian competitors.

Although the three companies mentioned were not formally merged owing to legal difficulties, the commercial success of Polón's investments created a "de facto group" or a cluster of three large companies in the early 1920s. The 'holding company' was operated by the board of directors of the Rubber Factory and by its CEO, owner and chairman of the board, Polón. Polón had to resign as CEO of the Suomen Kumitehdas in November 1929 after suffering from increasing symptoms of paralysis. His successor Torsten Westerlund had long opposed the merging of the companies because he feared that the leftist forces in Finland would insist on nationalization as the group had already become too large. The companies were officially merged with Nokia Ab in 1967.

== Political resistance and expulsion ==
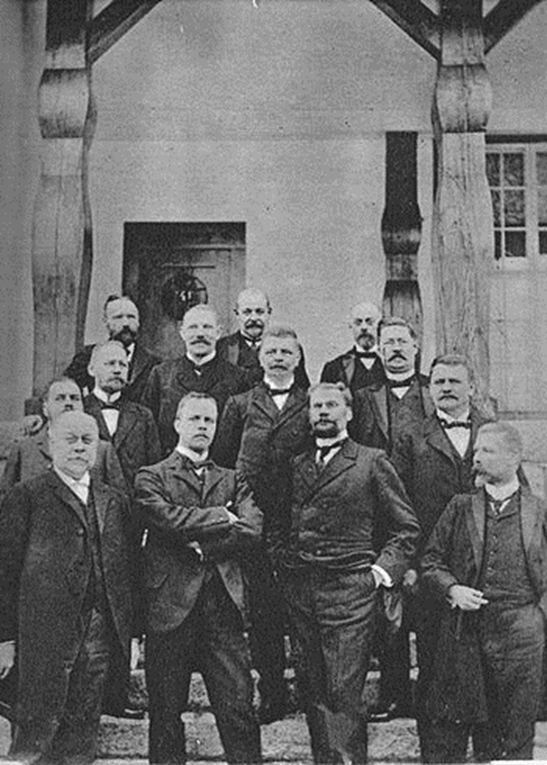
Members of Kagaal in Träskända Manor in Espoo on 10 April 1903. Eero Erkko second from the right, PE Svinhufvud behind the door and Eduard Polón second from the top.

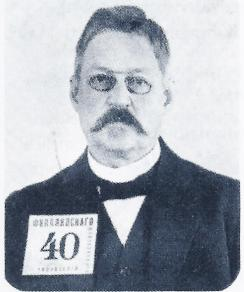
Eduard Polón photographed for the Siberian deportation passport in 1916.

During the first period of oppression, Polón participated in the resistance, becoming the leader of Kagal. He was therefore forced to resign as Chancellor of the Prison Administration in 1903. Between the periods of oppression, Polón represented the city of Helsinki in the bourgeois estate in the last days of the 1904–1905 and 1905–1906 estates. He was also a member of the Helsinki City Council from 1906 to 1911.

During the second oppression, Polón was expelled to Russia's governorate of Kostroma in 1916. He was able to return to Finland the following year.

Deportation did not discourage Polón, as he kept track of domestic affairs through correspondences and magazines that were filtered through the war censorship. He managed the Finnish Rubber Factory in Siberia and traded shares on the Helsinki Stock Exchange which led to significant gains during his exile. Finland's best-known banker at the time was Polón's friend, Wilhelm Bensow, who twice traveled to Siberia to meet his customer.

== Other activities ==
Polón accumulated substantial wealth through successful stock investments and was a major shareholder in many companies. He performed charitable work, donating to Marttaliitto, among others. He also was Marttaliitto's anchor investor.

Former president Pehr Evind Svinhufvud wanted to award Polón the title of Finland's first mountain councilor, but Polón refused.

== Family ==
Polón's was married to the writer Edith Polón. They had six children, one of whom died young. His wife predeceased him in 1915.

Polón's eldest son, Eino Polón, went to Germany in January 1916 as a member of the Jäger movement. It was one of the reasons for his father's expulsion. The younger son, Tauno, was expelled together with Eduard Polón.

== Death ==
Polón died in Helsinki's Kaivopuisto on 30 September 1930.
