= Koria =

- Village
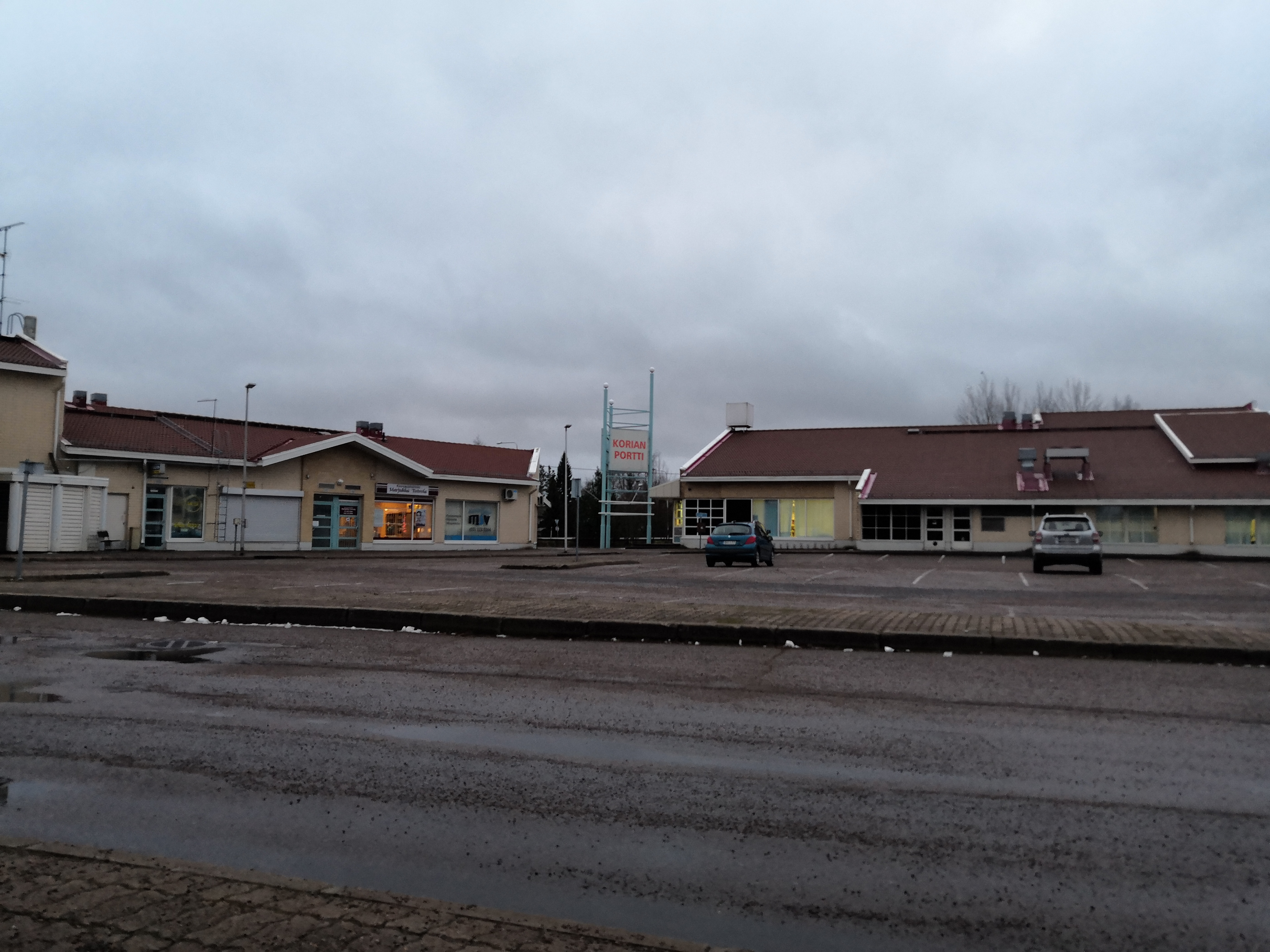
- The center of Koria

- Location within Finland Location within Kymenlaakso
- Coordinates: 60°50′N 26°36′E
- Country: Finland
- Region: Kymenlaakso
- Sub-region: Kouvola sub-region
- Town: Kouvola

Area
  - Total: 7.91 km^{2} (3.05 sq mi)

Population (2021)
  - Total: 3,848
  - Density: 486/km^{2} (1,260/sq mi)
- Time zone: UTC+2 (EET)
  - Summer (DST): UTC+3 (EEST)
- Postal code: 45610

Koria is an urban area (taajama) in the region of Kymenlaakso, Finland. It is under the administration of the town of Kouvola. It is located on Finnish national road 6 6.7 kilometres (4.2 mi) west of the Kouvola centre and 129 kilometres (80 mi) from Helsinki.

Prior to 2009, Koria was part of the town of Elimäki's administrative area, and possessed a population of 5,100 inhabitants. After 2009, Elimäki was consolidated along with 5 other municipalities to form the Town of Kouvola. It is neighbored by the districts of Kankaro, Ruotsula, Keltti, Muhniemi and Myllykoski. The garrison of pioneer troops operated from 1945 to 1994 in Koria.

A data center of TikTok is planned in Koria.

== Gallery ==
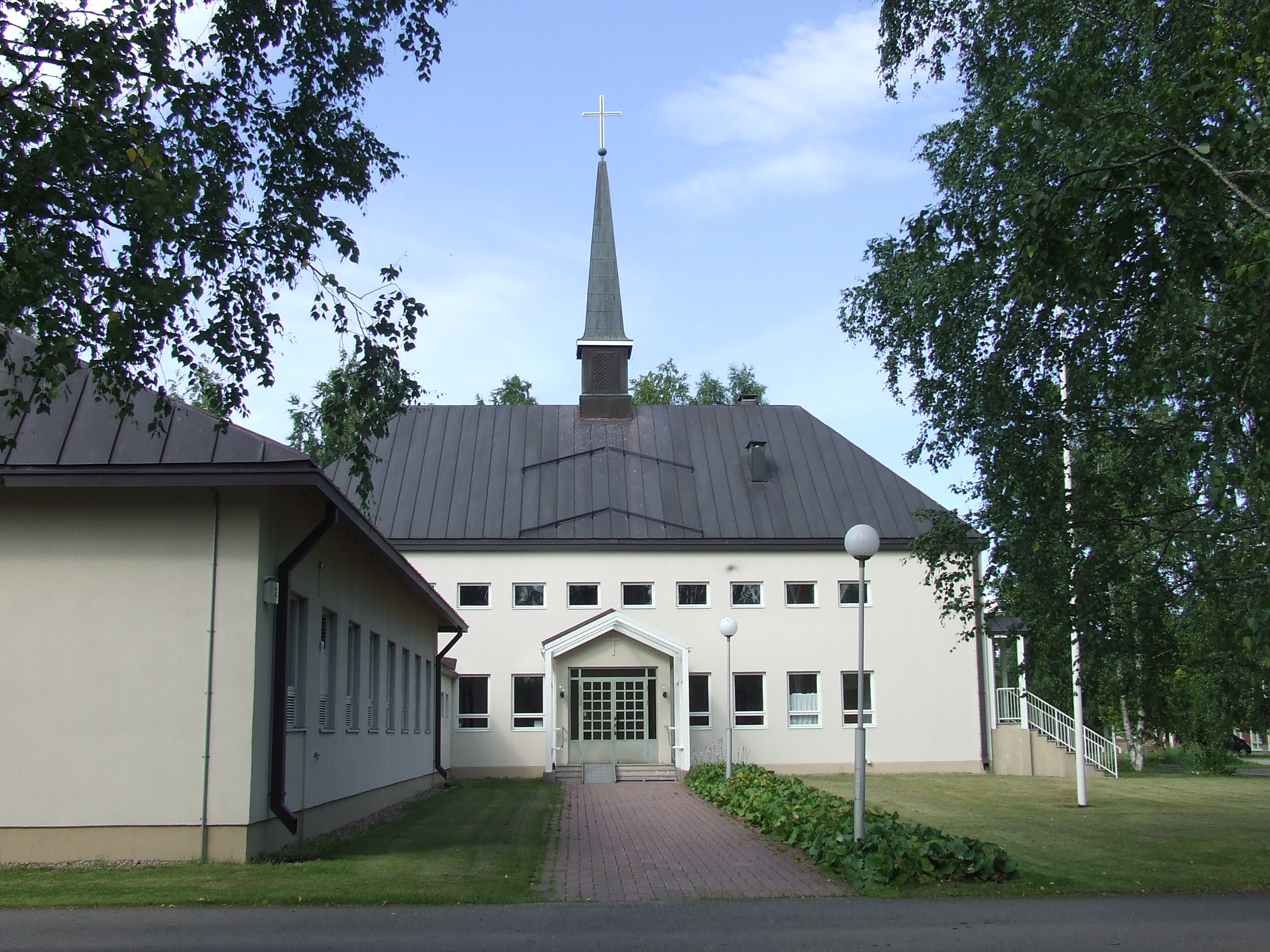
Koria Church

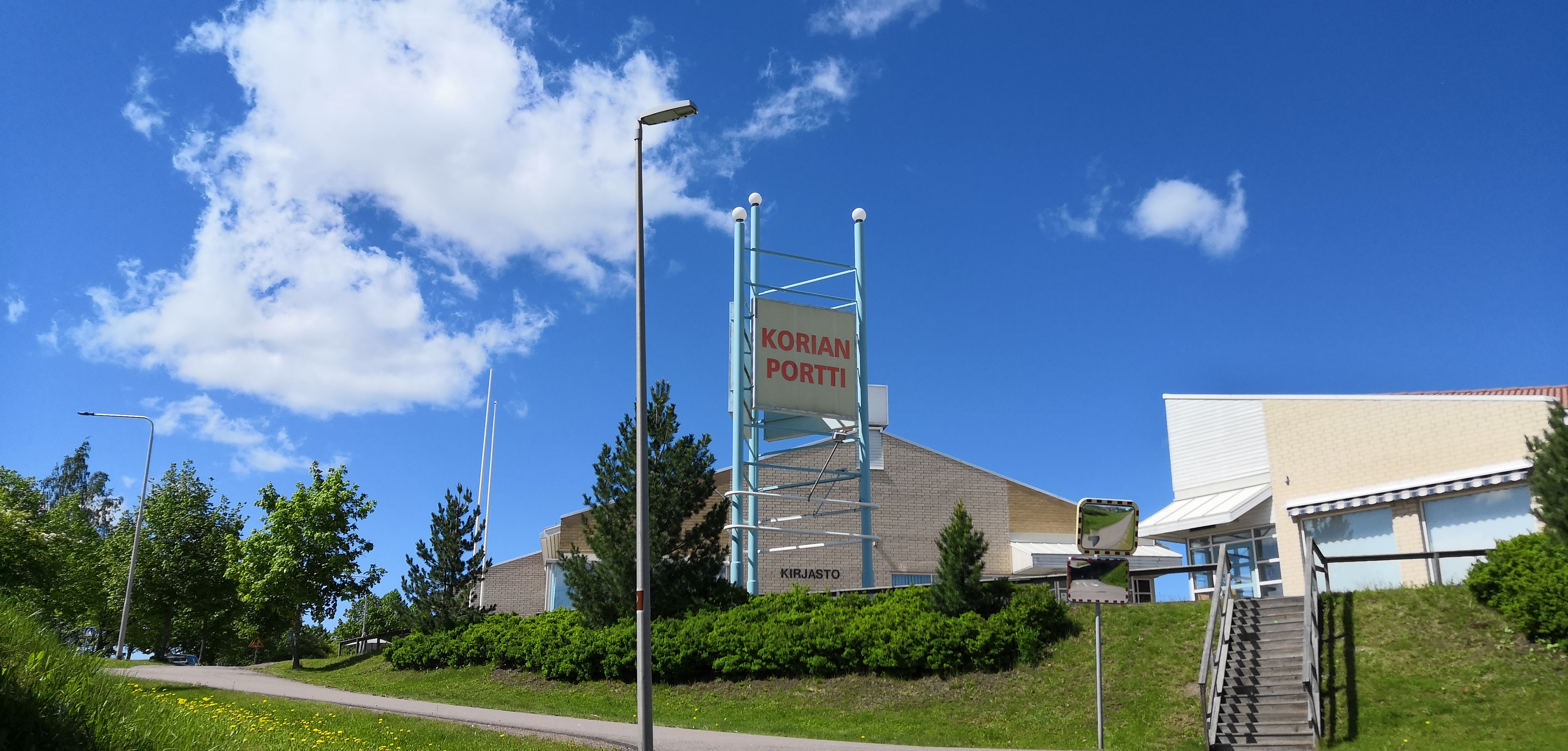
Korian Portti shopping center

== See also ==
- Koria railway station
