= Taarasti Art Center =

- Taidekeskus Taarasti
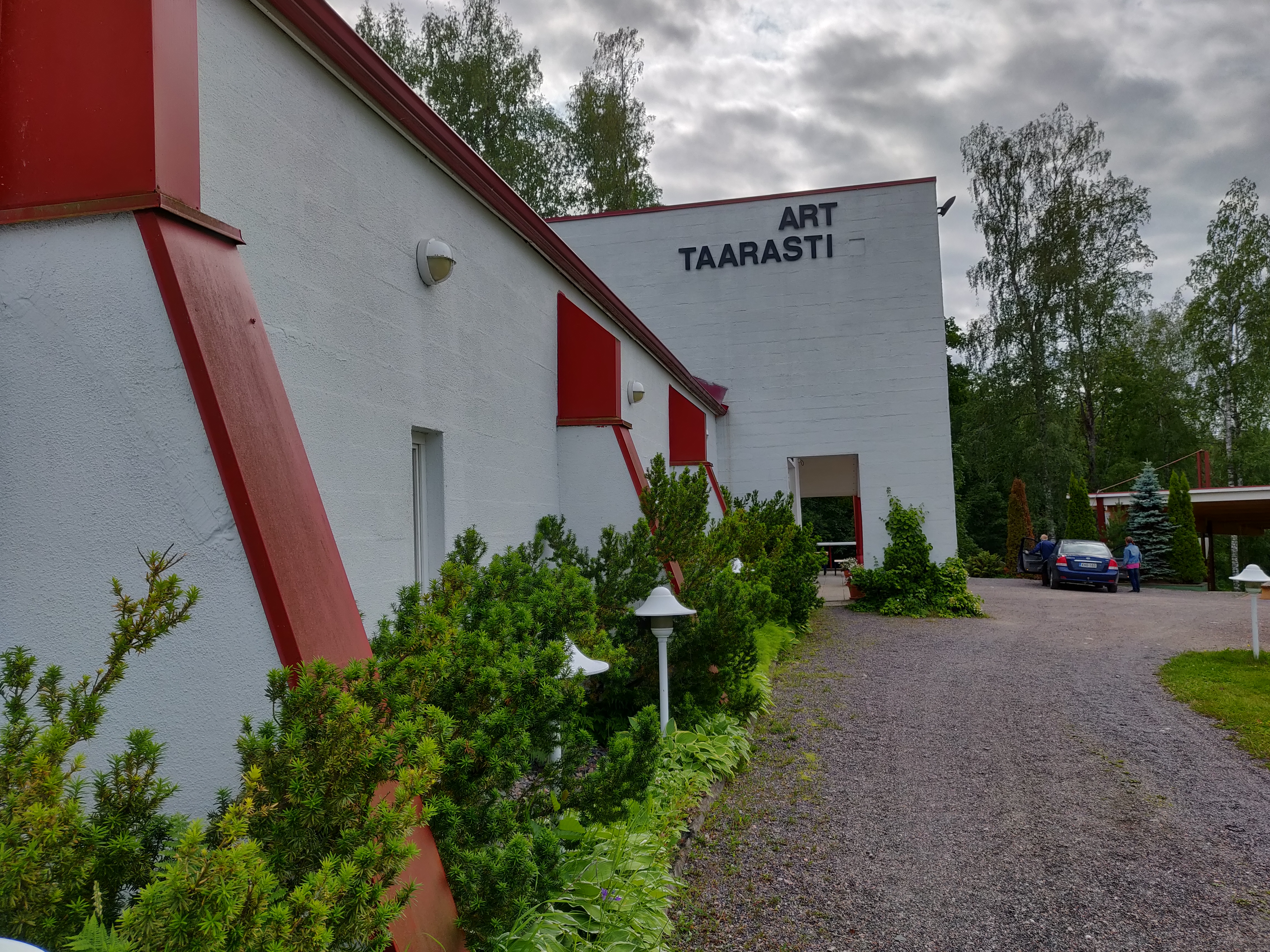
- Established: 1981, art hall in 1990
- Location: Taarastintie 6, Nastola, Lahti, Finland
- Coordinates: 60.950277°N 25.929290°E
- Type: Arts centre
- Architect: Erkki Aarti
- Website: Taidekeskus Taarasti

Taarasti Art Center or Taidekeskus Taarasti is an art center located in Nastola, Lahti, Finland. The center is located by the lake Pikku-Kukkanen and near the Pajulahti Sports Institute.

Taarasti hosts changing art exhibitions but also concerts and summer theater plays. The premises are also rented and used for private events.

The art hall building in Taarasti was completed in 1990. It was designed by architect Erkki Aarti. Taarasti is owned and operated by the local art association called Nastolan Taideyhdistys ry. The association started its operations on the plot already in 1981 when the plot was originally rented by the association. The father of the art hall project in the 80's was Esko Koskinen, a local entrepreneur.

Taarasti Art Center was the recipient of Aukusti Award for the year 2017. It was awarded by a local newspaper called Etelä-Suomen Sanomat for the important cultural work done in Taarasti previous year in organizing art exhibitions.
