= Uusikylä, Lahti =

Uusikylä
- District of Lahti
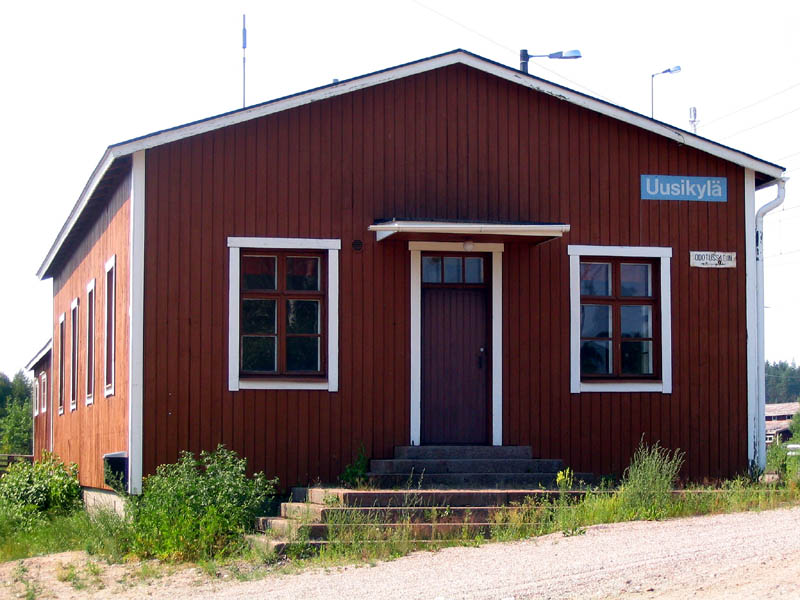
- Uusikylä railway station
- Interactive map of Uusikylä
- Coordinates: 60°55′40″N 26°1′25″E
- Country: Finland
- Region: Päijät-Häme
- Municipality: Lahti

Population (2020)
  - Total: 1,728
- (approximate)
- Postal codes: 16100
- District number: 36

Uusikylä is the 36th district of the city of Lahti and village of the former Nastola municipality, in the region of Päijät-Häme, Finland. It borders the districts of Immilä in the north, Villähde in the west and Nastola in the northwest, as well as the municipalities of Iitti in the east and Orimattila in the south.

The population of the statistical district of Uusikylä was 1,728 in 2019.

== History ==
The documented history of Uusikylä reaches back to the Middle Ages; its first mention in writing dates back to a document from 1422, concerning a court meeting in the village. During this era, the village was situated in a central location along a road connecting the branches of the Ylinen Viipurintie, the trade road stretching from Tavastia to Vyborg. Pönnölänmäki is among the first places populated in Uusikylä: its first estates moved there in the 1600s, and its population increased over the 1800s.

The Riihimäki–Saint Petersburg railway, with its only original station in the territory of Nastola being placed in Uusikylä, marked a notable shift in the village's development, as its center began to gravitate further south towards the station. The residential area of Kanerva, directly north and northwest from the station, developed in the post-war era.
