= Nastola =

- Former municipality
- Nastolan kunta Nastola kommun
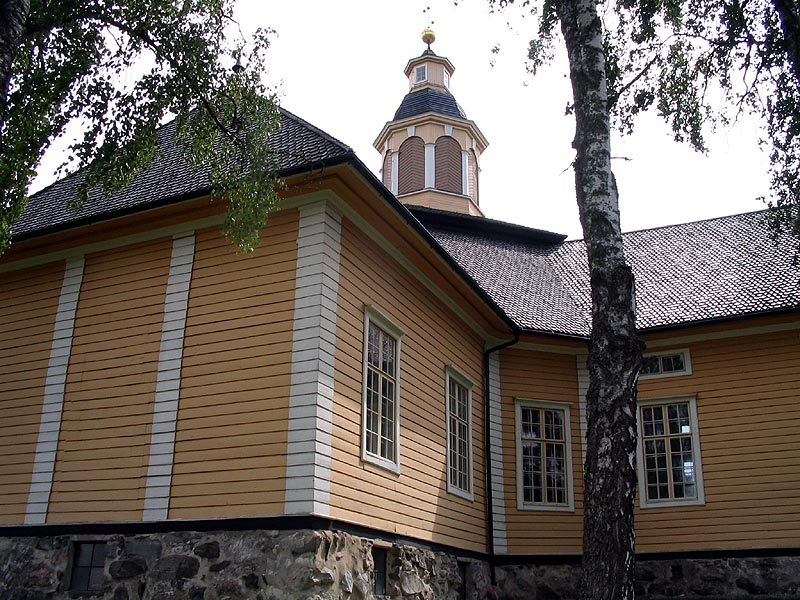
- Nastola Church

- Coat of arms

- Location of Nastola in Finland
- Coordinates: 60°57′N 025°56′E
- Country: Finland
- Region: Päijät-Häme
- Sub-region: Lahti sub-region
- Charter: 1869
- Consolidated: 2016

Government
  - Municipality manager: Pauli Syyrakki

Area
  - Total: 382.86 km^{2} (147.82 sq mi)
  - Land: 324.19 km^{2} (125.17 sq mi)
  - Water: 38.67 km^{2} (14.93 sq mi)

Population (2015-06-30)
  - Total: 14,905
  - Density: 45.976/km^{2} (119.08/sq mi)
- Time zone: UTC+2 (EET)
  - Summer (DST): UTC+3 (EEST)
- Website: www.nastola.fi

Nastola is a former municipality of Finland. It was merged with the city of Lahti on 1 January 2016.

In the province of Southern Finland, Nastola is part of the Päijät-Häme region. The municipality had a population of 14,905 (30 June 2015) and covered an area of 382.86 km^{2} (147.82 sq mi) of which 38.67 km^{2} (14.93 sq mi) was water. The population density was 45.9761/km^{2} (119.078/sq mi). Nastola is located between two major cities: Lahti and Kouvola. Kausala, the administrative center of Iitti, is 26 kilometres (16 mi) away from Nastola in the direction of Kouvola.

The municipality was unilingually Finnish.

== History ==
Ornamental items, presumed to date back to the 1200s, have been found in the village of Ruuhijärvi. Although the items are of Karelian design, scholars agree that they are not necessarily indicative of Karelian settlement in Nastola. Additionally, English, German and Scandinavian coins have been found in Immilä. Etymologic research indicates that the earliest settlers in Nastola originated from contemporary Asikkala and Hollola, in addition to the surroundings of lake Vanajavesi; indeed, Ruuhijärvi, then covering most of what is now known as Nastola, became one of the quarters of the administrative parish of Asikkala in the 1500s.

The name of Nastola may be of Karelian origin, referring to a Karelian male name Nasto (folk form of Anastasios). The first administrative center over the area was Uusikylä (Swedish: Nyby), which was also the name of an administrative unit within the Hollola and later the Asikkala parish in the 15th century. The first church in the area was built in the village of Nastola (first mentioned in 1478), which gave its name to the chapel community and the later parish. Nastola became an independent parish in 1860.

Nastola was consolidated with Lahti in 2016.

== Geography ==
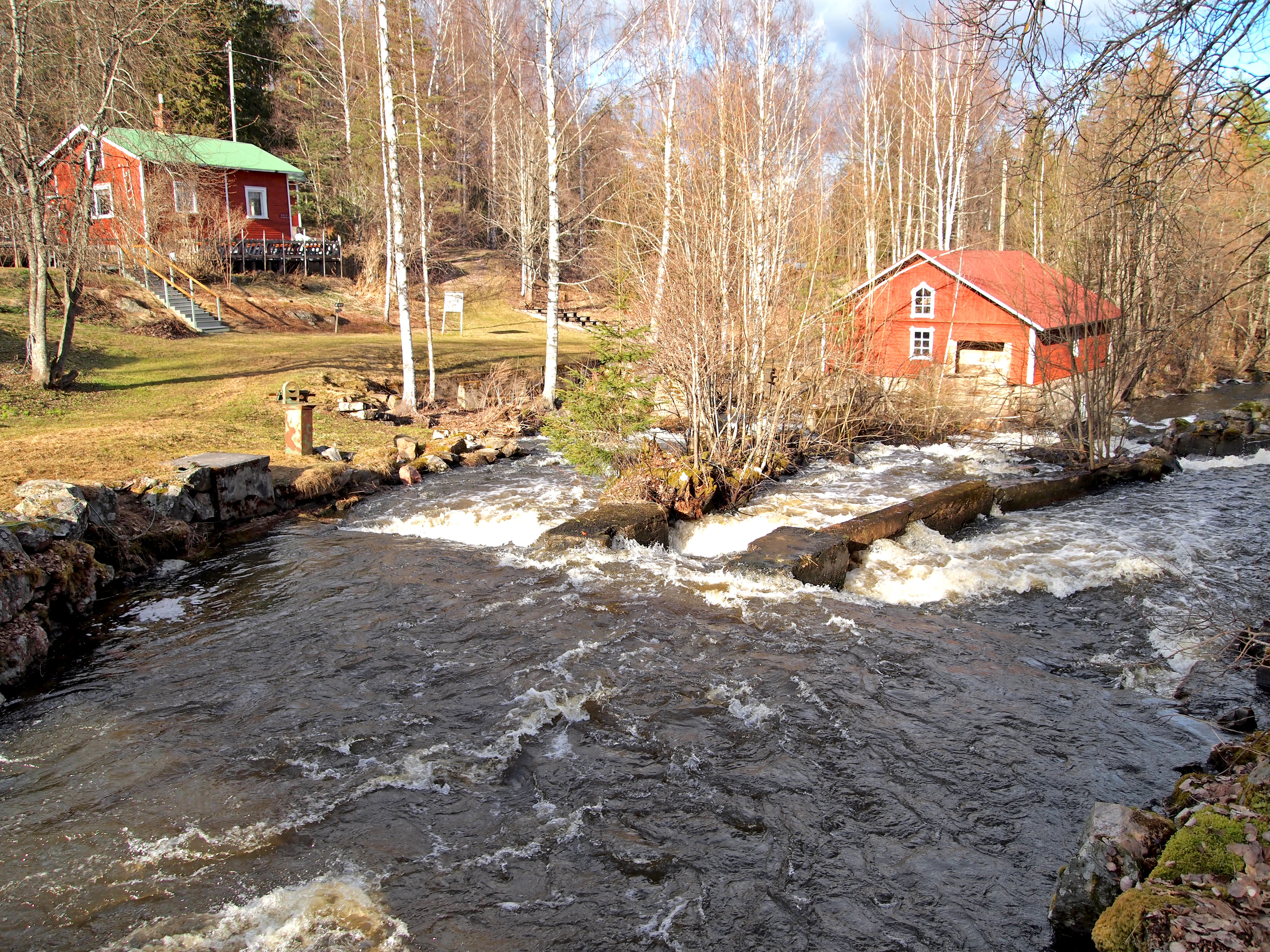
Immilä mill

Nastola is wedged between the first and second Salpausselkäs, the former being a prominent feature in the terrain and landscape of the southern part of the municipality. In the west, it splits in two distinct ridges around the village of Villähde, and reaches it highest point in the parish village at 145 metres (476 ft) above sea level. Moving further east towards Iitti, the ridge becomes narrower and its ridgelines steepen in the surroundings of Uusikylä. The area between the Salpausselkäs is characterized by its eskers and valleys. The esker of Vahteristonmäki, reaching past lake Kymijärvi further north into Heinola, peaks at 177 metres (581 ft) above sea level in Nastola.

Till is the dominant type of soil in central and northern Nastola, with clay deposits mostly being concentrated to the south of the first Salpausselkä, as well as around the lakes of Ruuhijärvi, Sylvöjärvi and Oksjärvi. The till areas are dotted with bedrock protrusions, such as the 150 metres (490 ft) high Ukonvuori hill in the east. The rocks on the south side of the Salpausselkäs tend to be lower and more rounded, and the majority of the bedrock consists of granite. All of the lakes of Nastola, which are also all part of the Kymijärvi drainage basin, are situated to the north of the first Salpausselkä; to its south are several smaller streams of water.

== List of villages ==
Arrajoki, Immilä, Koiskala, Lankila, Pyhäntaka, Ruuhijärvi, Uusikylä, Vanaja, Villähde, Kirkonkylä, Rakokivi, Seesta- Luhtaanmaa, Järvinen, Tapiola.

== Attractions ==
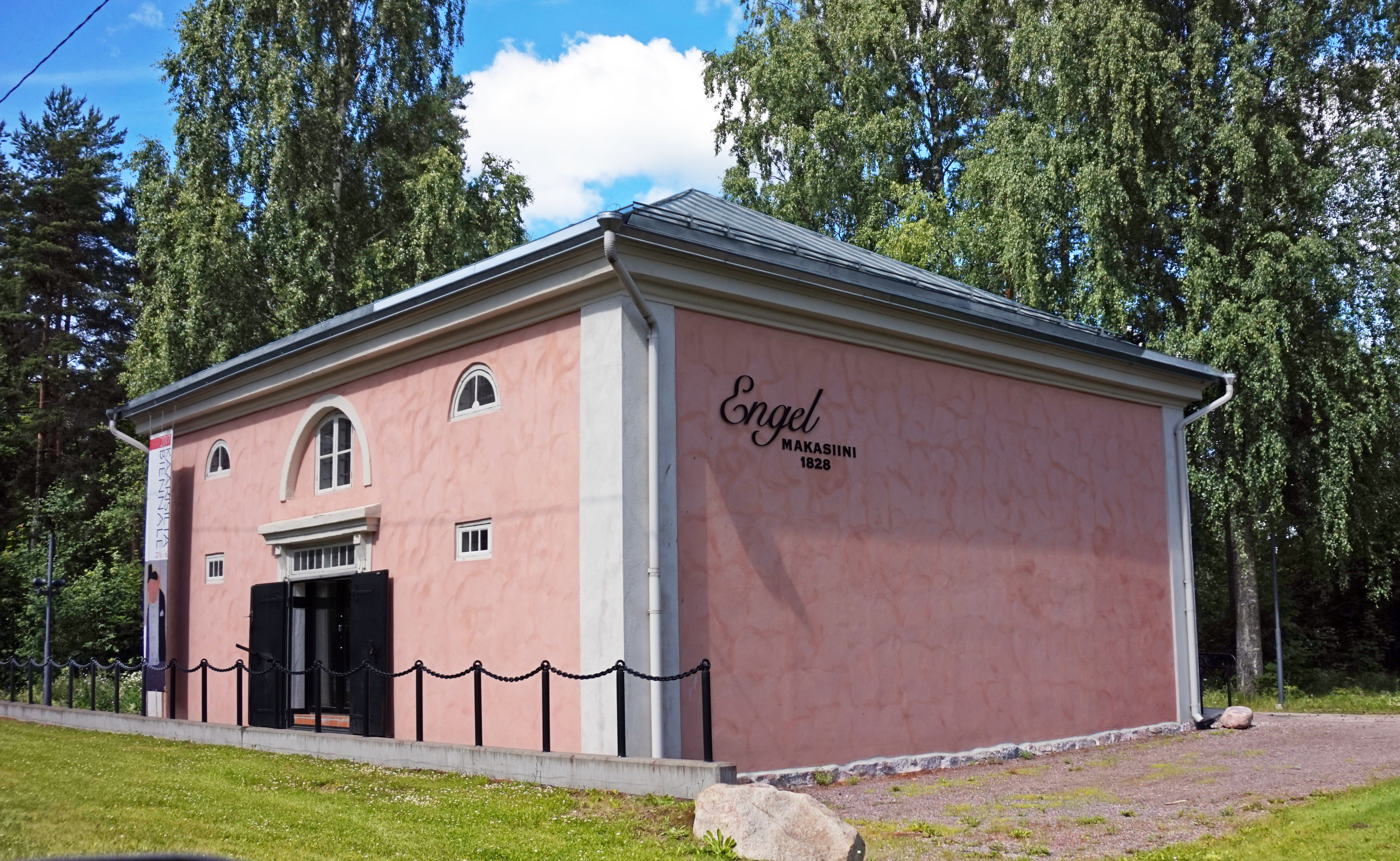
Engel Makasiini storehouse

- Pajulahti Sports Institute
- Anni Kaste Memorial stone
- Defenders of the home country memorial stone
- Nastola cemetery
- German memorial
- King's Ridge observation tower
- King's fountain
- Ruuhijärvi cultural landscape
- Mountain Troll's observation tower
- Engel's storehouse
- Immilä mill
- Kumia mill
- Nastola church
- Nastola history museum
- Taarasti Art Center

== Notable people from Nastola ==
- Adelaïde Ehrnrooth, feminist author
- Elsi Borg, architect
- Eduard Polón, founder of Nokia
- Valtteri Bottas, Formula 1 driver
- Veli-Matti Lindström, ski jumper
- Ville Väinölä, ice-hockey player
