= Kouvola railway station =

Railway station in Kouvola, Finland

Kouvola
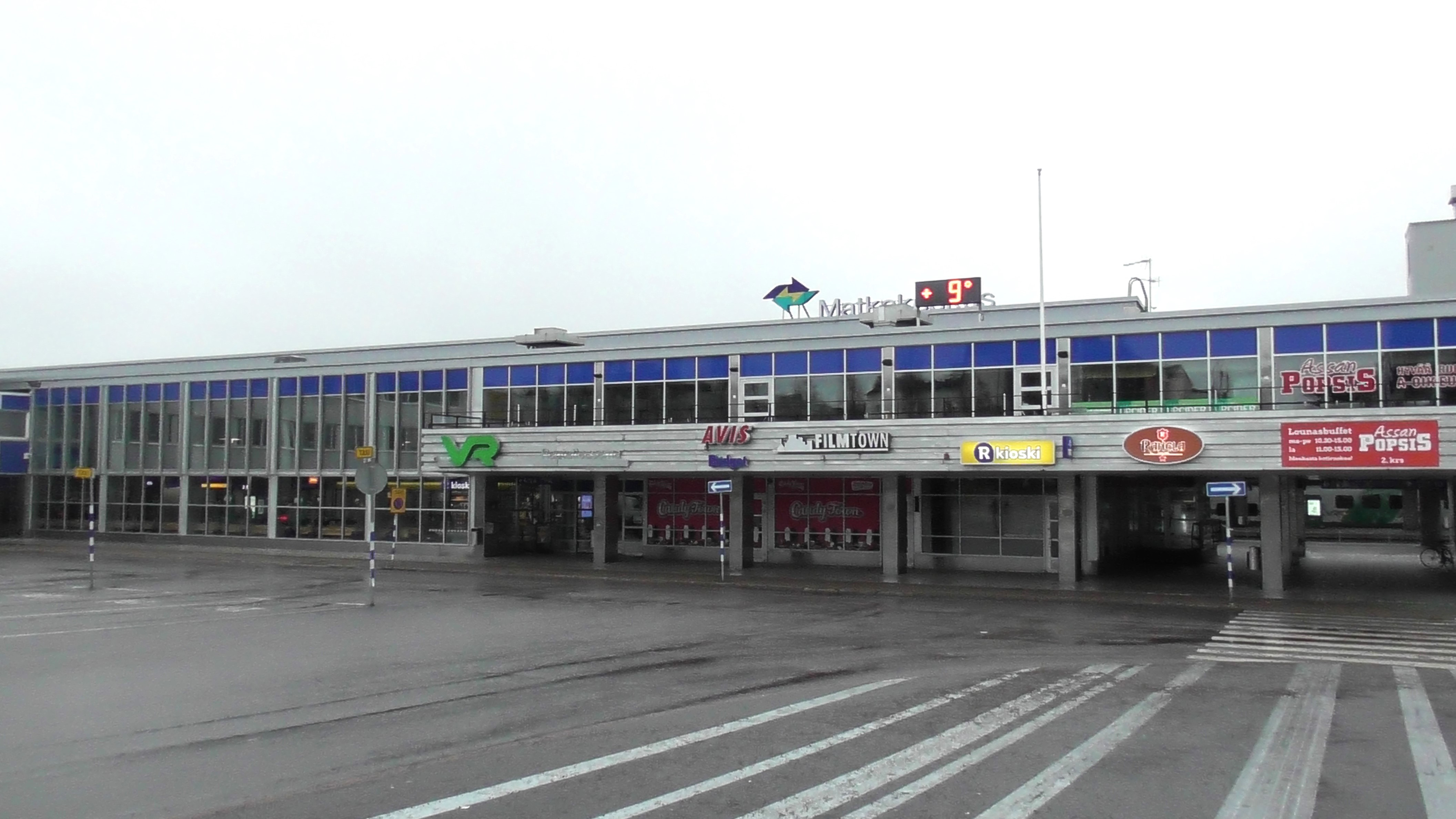

General information
- Location: Hallituskatu 345100; Kouvola; Finland
- Coordinates: 60°51′58″N 26°42′18″E
- System: VR station
- Owner: Finnish Transport Agency
- Operator: VR Group
- Line: Riihimäki–Saint Petersburg railway
- Platforms: 4
- Tracks: 7

Construction
- Structure type: Ground station
- Parking: Yes
- Cycle facilities: Yes (at biking share station)

History
- Opened: 1875

Passengers
- 2008: 634,000
Services
Preceding station	VR Group	Following station
Koria towards Lahti	Lahti–Kouvola	Terminus
Terminus	Kouvola–Iisalmi	Mäntyharju towards Iisalmi
Terminus	Kouvola–Joensuu	Lappeenranta towards Joensuu
Preceding station	VR commuter rail	Following station
Koria towards Helsinki	Z	Terminus
Koria towards Lahti	O	Myllykoski towards Kotkan satama
Location
- Location within Kymenlaakso

The Kouvola railway station (Finnish: Kouvolan rautatieasema, Swedish: Kouvola järnvägsstation) is located in the city of Kouvola in Finland.

The Kouvola railway station is an important crossing point station. It is located about 130 kilometres (80 mi) from the Helsinki Central railway station. There is also a bus terminal by the station and together they form a travel centre.

Kouvola is one of the busiest crossing points in Finnish railways. There is traffic to four directions: to Helsinki via Lahti, to Kotka, to Pieksämäki and Kuopio via Mikkeli, and to Luumäki, after which the track forks to two directions: to Joensuu via Lappeenranta, or to Russia via the Vainikkala border control station. The Kouvola railway station serves local trains, express trains, InterCity trains, and Pendolino trains.

The service to Vyborg and St. Petersburg was accelerated in 2010, with new Allegro trains operated by Karelian Trains. The travel time on high speed train between Kouvola and St. Petersburg is approximately 2 hours 15 minutes. The service was completely suspended in 2022 due to Russian invasion of Ukraine.

Proposals exist to connect Kouvola to Helsinki via a new 106 km line, Itärata, through Porvoo and Helsinki Airport.

== Departure tracks ==
Out of the tracks at Kouvola railway station, tracks 1, 3, 4, 6, 7, 9 and 10 have a platform for passenger trains. Tracks 2, 5 and 8 are used by trains (e. g. freight trains) that do not stop at the station.

- Track 1 is used by the majority of the Helsinki–Kuopio–Oulu long-distance trains, both towards Helsinki and Kuopio. The track is also used by one Z train service to Helsinki.
- Track 3 is used by O trains to Lahti and some to Kotka Port.
- Track 4 is used by some of the O to Kotka Port as well as by one long-distance train service to Joensuu and one to Kajaani.
- Track 6 is used by long-distance trains from Imatra/Joensuu to Helsinki.
- Track 7 is used by long-distance trains to Imatra/Joensuu.
- Track 9 is used by one Z train service to Helsinki.
- Track 10 is used by some of the O to Kotka Port as well as one Z train service to Helsinki.

== Gallery ==
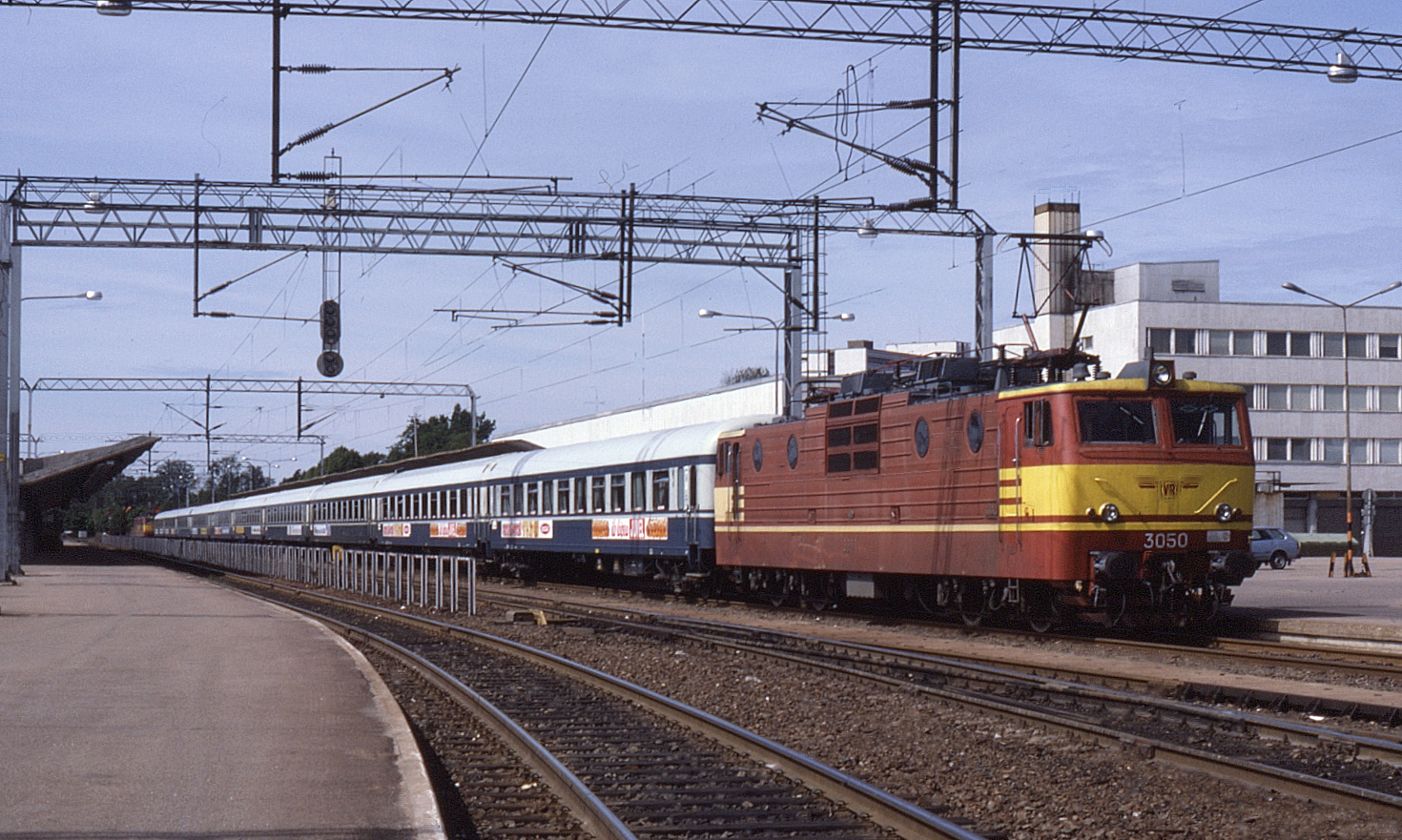
Sr1 at Kouvola railway station in 1986

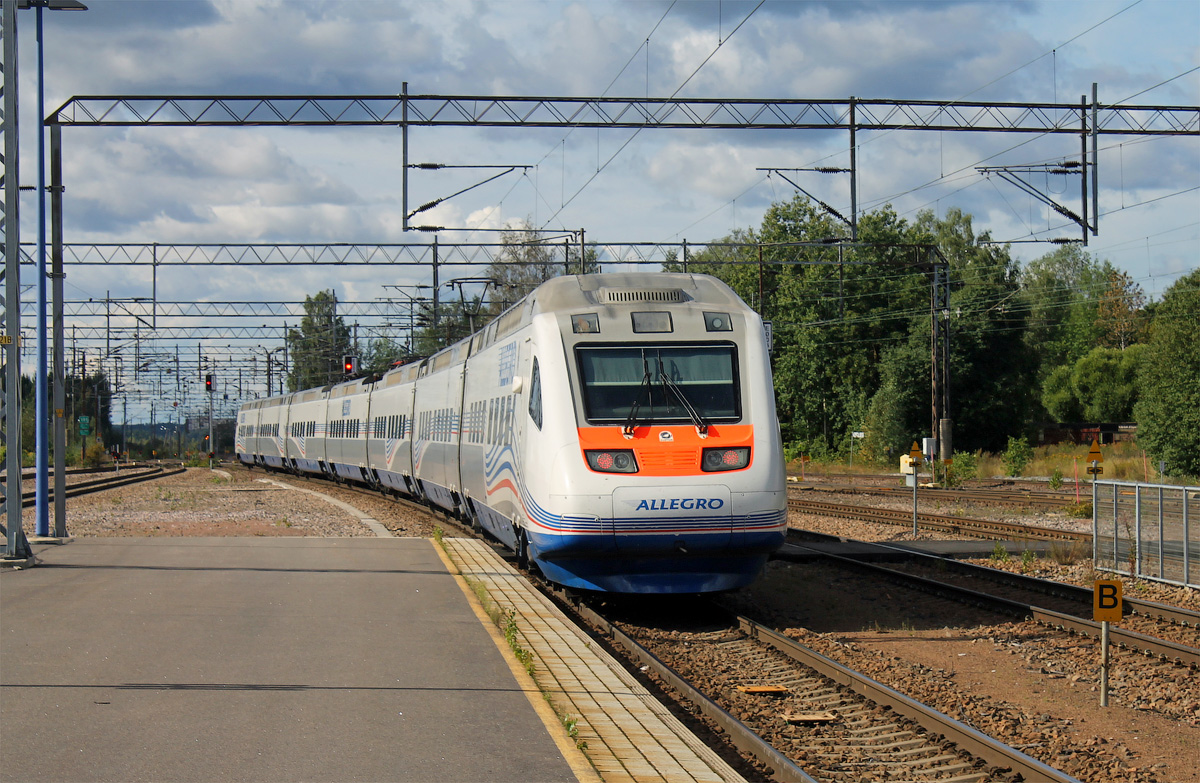
Allegro arriving at Kouvola railway station

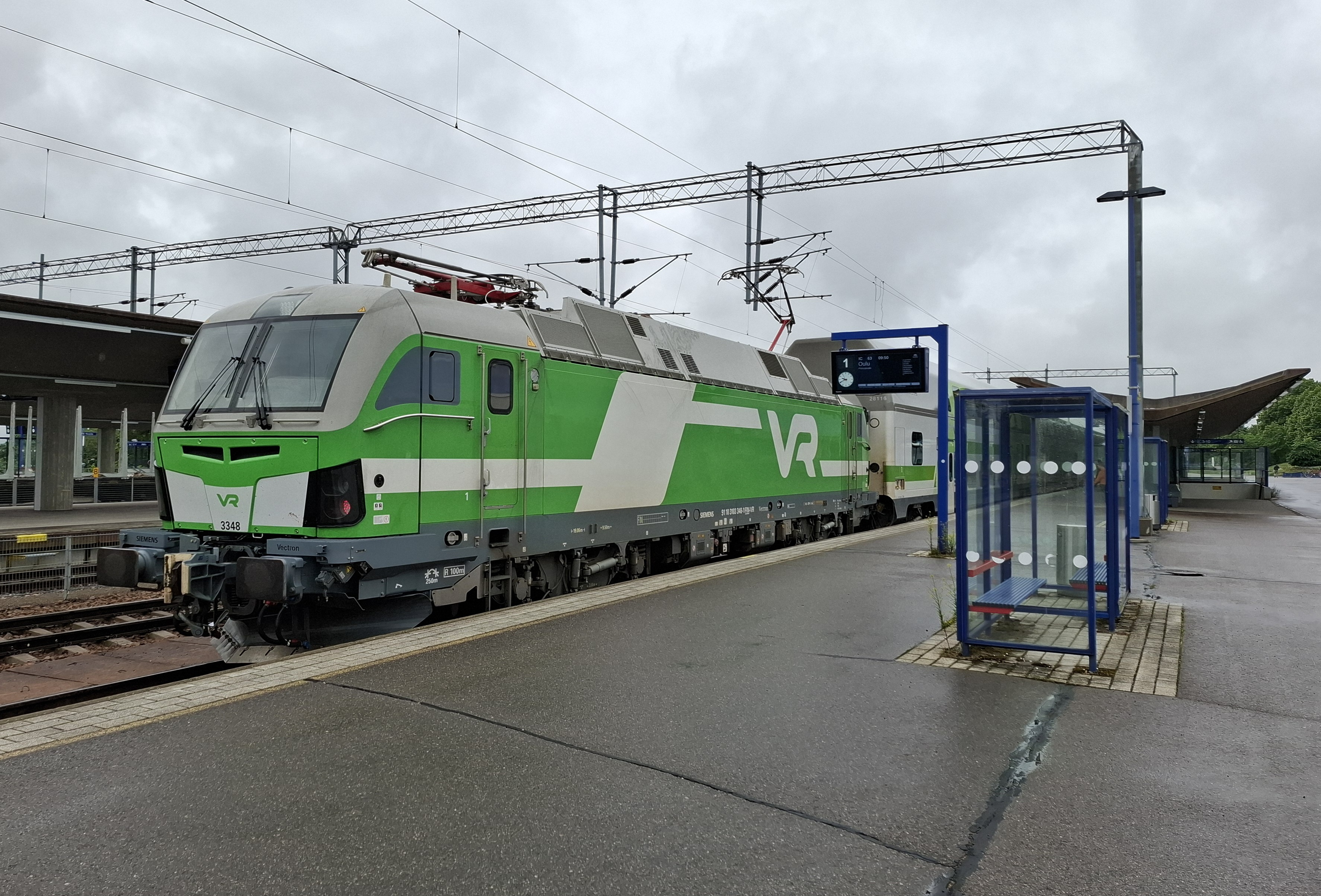
Sr3 at Kouvola railway station in 2024

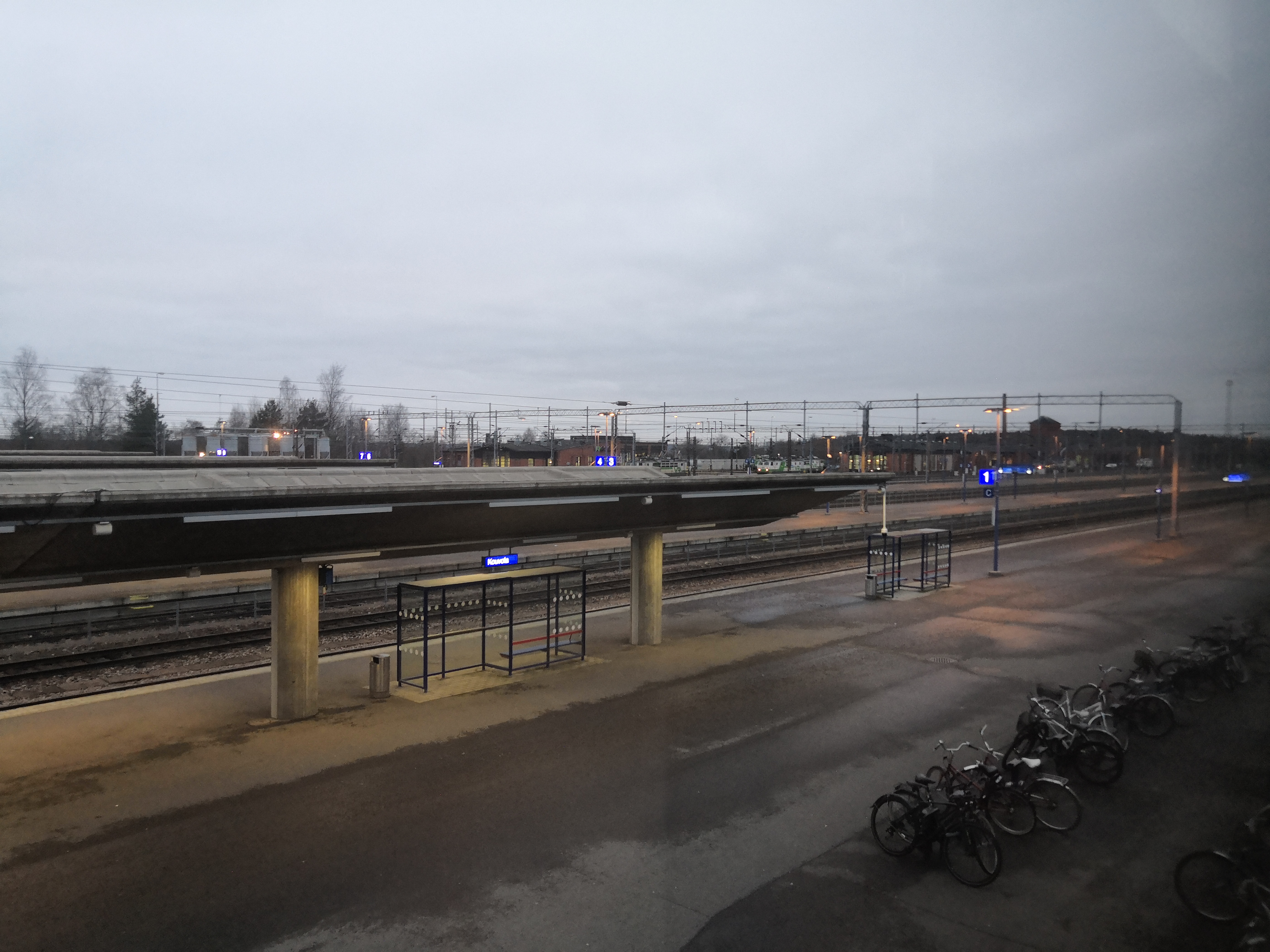
Kouvola railway station in 2019

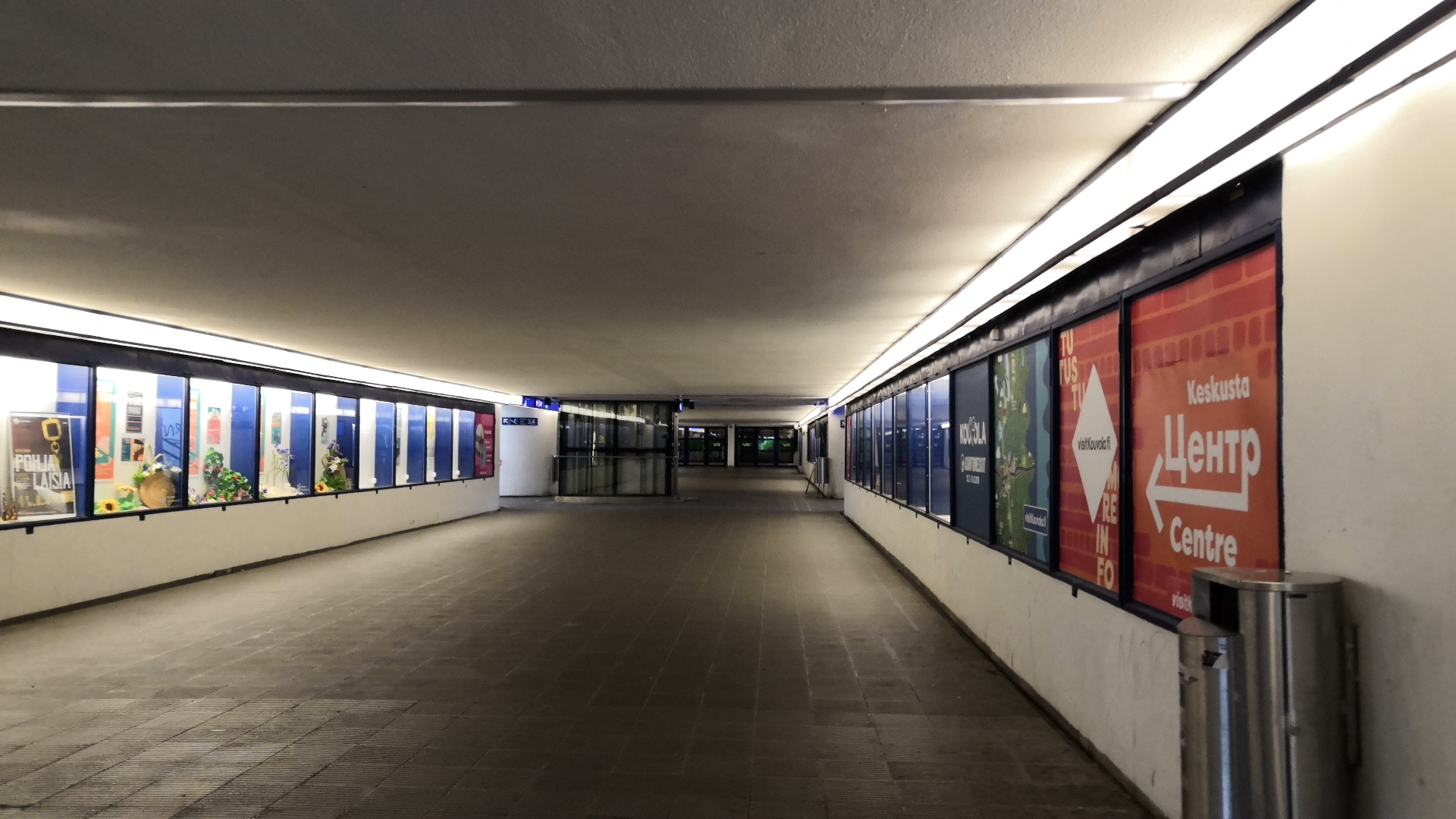
Tunnel under the station's tracks in 2019

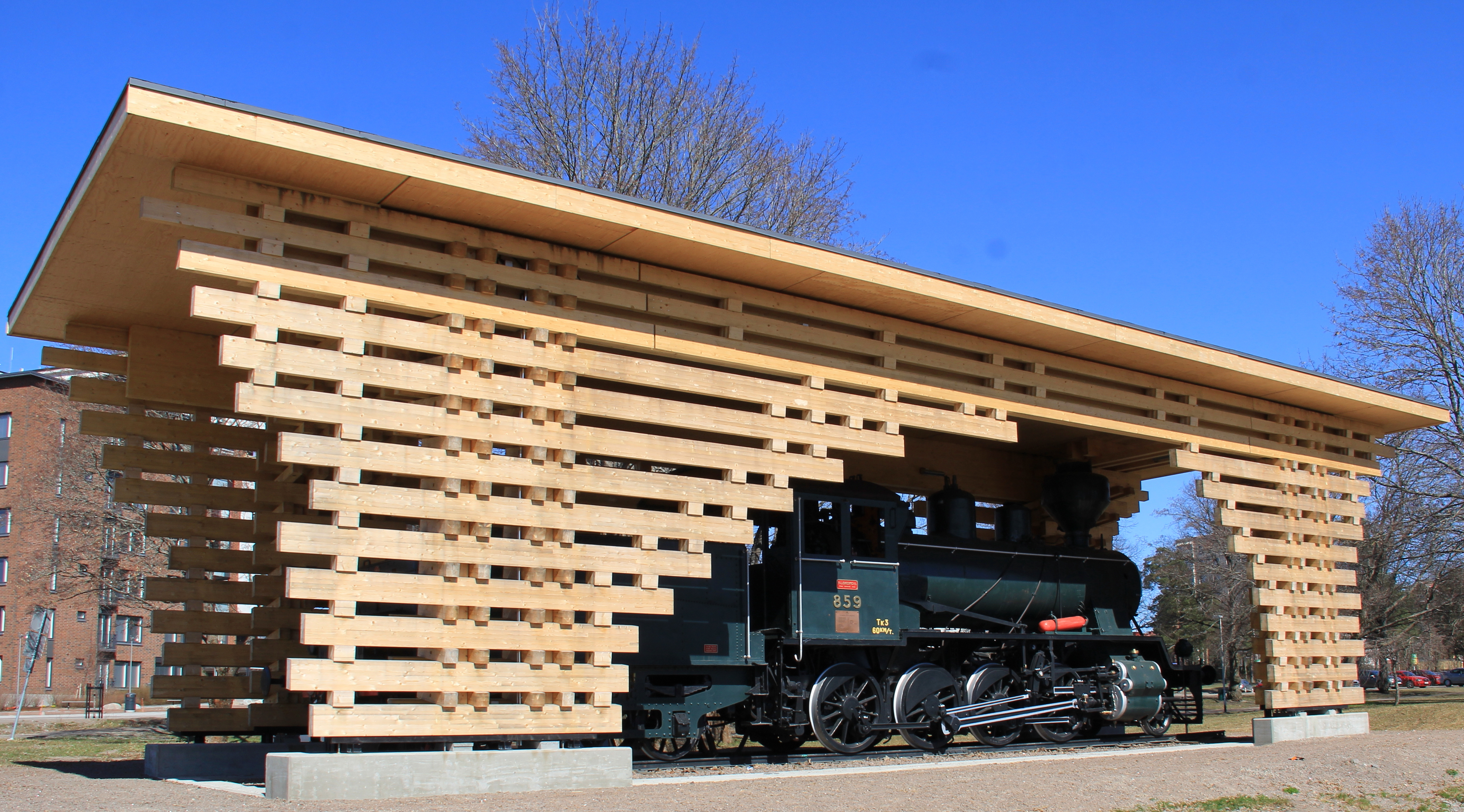
Wooden canopy for VR Class Tk3 "Ruuhveltti", Canopy was unveiled in October 2022. It was designed by students of Aalto University in Espoo.
