= VR commuter rail =

Commuter rail system in Finland

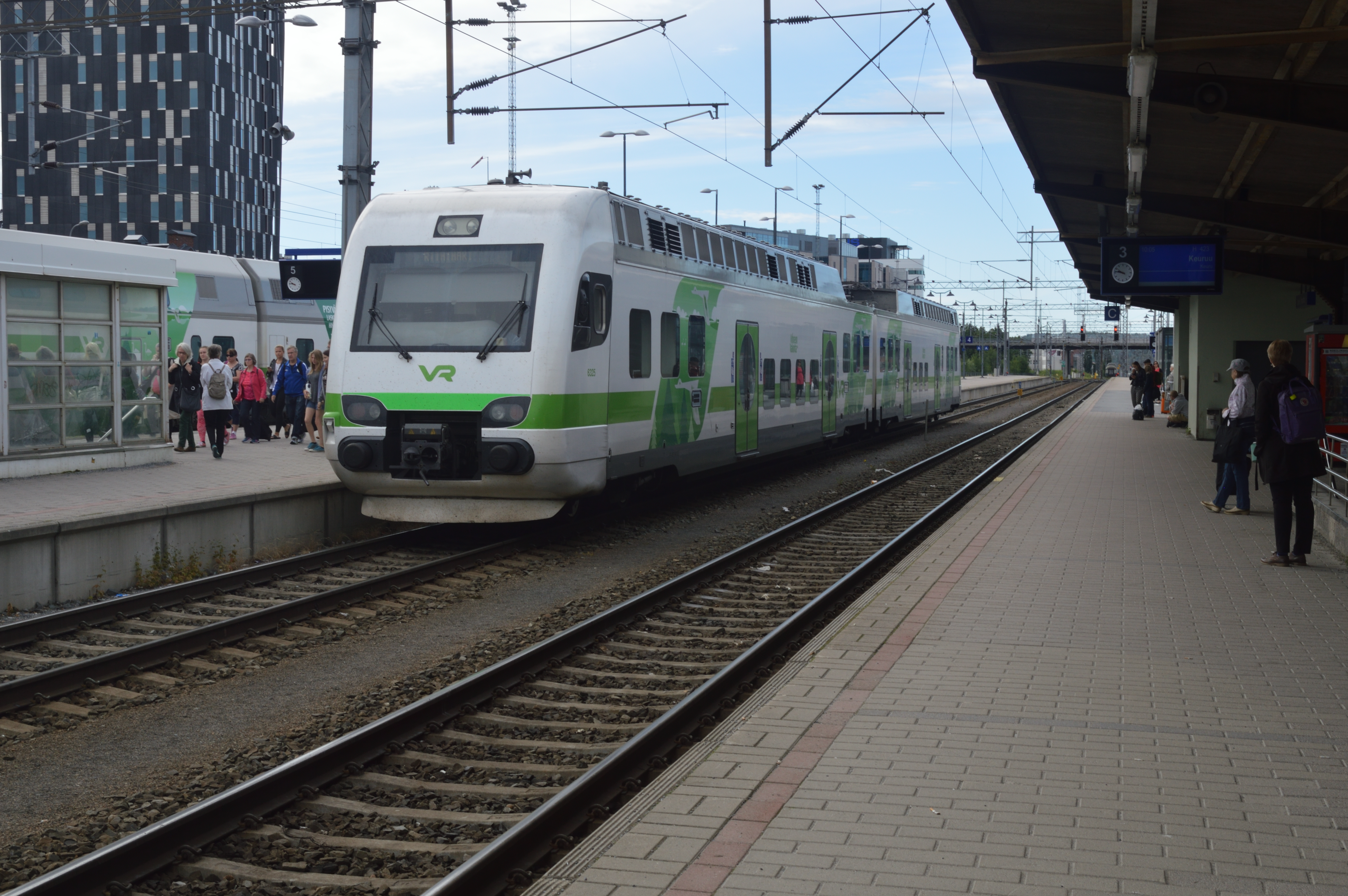
- A Class Sm4 unit at Tampere station in July 2016 after working a Main Line regional service.

Overview
- Native name: Finnish: VR:n lähiliikenne Swedish: VR:s närtrafik
- Area served: Regions of Uusimaa; Kanta-Häme; Kymenlaakso; Pirkanmaa; Päijät-Häme; Finland
- Transit type: Commuter rail
- Number of lines: 8
- Number of stations: 36
- Website: https://www.vr.fi/en/railway-stations-and-routes/commuter-traffic

Operation
- Began operation: 28 May 1972
- Operator: VR
- Character: Above ground
- Number of vehicles: 36 Sm2 + 30 Sm4
- Train length: 2-8 cars

Technical
- System length: 112 km (70 mi)
- Track gauge: 1,524 mm (5 ft) (Russian gauge)
- Electrification: 25 kV / 50 Hz
- Top speed: 160 km/h

VR commuter rail (Finnish: VR:n lähiliikenne, Swedish: VR:s närtrafik) is a Finnish commuter rail system operated by VR – the national railway operator of Finland – under a public service obligation agreement with the Ministry of Transport and Communications of Finland. The operations are planned in trilateral co-operation between the ministry, the operator and various regional transport authorities.

VR commuter rail consists of eight alphabetically identified services on six different railway lines. Five of these services terminate at Helsinki where the system is integrated with the Helsinki commuter rail system managed by the Helsinki Regional Transport Authority, whose the operations are currently also contracted out to VR. The system serves five regions of southern Finland which in total account for approximately half of the entire population of the country. Major cities and towns served include Tampere, Hämeenlinna, Lahti, Kouvola and Kotka.

== Services ==
D Limited-stop train from Helsinki to Hämeenlinna

A single return service operated on weekdays only, established in 2016. The D train departs from Hämeenlinna each weekday morning and returns from Helsinki in the afternoon. At a total travel time of 1 hour and 15 minutes, it is the Main Line's fastest commuter service, calling only at eight stations.

G Stopping train from Riihimäki to Lahti

An hourly service operated daily between the Main Line and the Lahti Line, the G train came into existence in 2017, replacing a two-hourly regional connection along the same route. This service connects remote villages and towns to their respective regional centres, whilst also serving as a connection between the main rail interchanges of Riihimäki and Lahti.

H Stopping train from Hanko to Karis, on certain departures an express train from Karis to Helsinki

A daily service stopping at all stations between Hanko and Karis with seven return services on weekdays and six on weekends. On Wednesday, Friday and Sunday, one service is operated from Hanko to Helsinki and vice versa, stopping only at six stations between Karis and Helsinki.

M Stopping train from Nokia to Tampere, on certain departures to Toijala

A weekday service in Greater Tampere and the surrounding region of Pirkanmaa, calling at all stations. Since its inception in 2019, the M train has consisted of two legs which meet each other at Tampere Central. As of 2022, the western leg towards Nokia has had hourly service, with every other departure continuing to the southern leg towards Toijala. In the southern direction, the M train is essentially a supplementary service to the two-hourly R train with identical stops, integrated timetables and shared rolling stock.

O Stopping train from Kotka Port to Kouvola and from Kouvola to Lahti

A daily service calling at all stations, the O train is a key connection between major cities and towns in the region of Kymenlaakso. It was instated in 2022 by merging VR's remaining regional services on the Saint Petersburg Line and the Kotka Line into a joint commuter service. Although the two legs share a common letter designation, the timetables remained nonsymmetrical and only three weekday departures run directly through the entire route, with services otherwise terminating at Kouvola.

R Limited-stop train from Helsinki to Riihimäki, on certain departures to Tampere or Nokia

The main commuter service of the Main Line with a half-hourly headway throughout the week. The R train only calls only at two major interchanges before Kerava, but at every station thereafter. The service has three different termini in the north; most trains terminate at Riihimäki but, departures extend to Tampere Central every two hours. There are also supplemental service between Riihimäki and Tampere, of which all but one extend to Nokia. The Helsinki-Tampere service is the longest on the entire VR commuter rail network, spanning 206 km and taking 2 hours and 15 minutes to complete.

T Stopping train from Helsinki to Riihimäki

A night service calling at all stations. As of 2022, the T train has three late-hour departures on weekdays and runs hourly through the night on weekends. Outside of the Helsinki commuter rail operating region, it is the only regular night time commuter rail service in Finland.

Z Limited-stop train from Helsinki to Lahti, on certain departures to Kouvola

An hourly service between Helsinki and Lahti, the Z train was launched in 2006 as the Lahti Line opened. Like the R train, it only calls at two major interchanges before Kerava, after which the two lines separate from each other. Certain peak and fringe hours departures continue up to Kouvola, mostly on weekdays, supplementing the O train on the Lahti-Kouvola section of the Saint Petersburg Line.

== Tickets ==
Unlike the dynamic ticket pricing on VR's long-distance trains, commuter rail tickets have set prices. The prices are determined separately for each combination of stations – alphabetical zones have been discontinued on VR commuter rail as the network has grown massively over the years. Certain discounts are available for military conscripts, alternative servants, children, pensioners and students.

All tickets for any Finnish passenger trains must be purchased in advance, with the exception of the Tampere region where platform validators are used. Rail transport in Finland works on a proof-of-payment system. Failing to present a valid ticket (or proof of one's right to a discount when applicable) is considered fare evasion; getting caught doing it results in a penalty fare of 80 euros across the system, including in the HSL and Nysse regions.

=== Within Greater Helsinki ===
HSL, the Helsinki regional transport authority, holds authority over issuing and inspecting tickets on all commuter trains passing through its operating region. VR tickets are necessary for journeys to and from the HSL region, whereas only HSL tickets are sold for journeys within it. Unlike in Greater Tampere, HSL tickets are not valid on long-distance trains within the HSL region.

=== Within Greater Tampere ===
Nysse, the Tampere regional transport authority, does not hold a similar position of authority akin to the HSL. Despite that, tickets issued by Nysse are valid on all commuter and long-distance services between Nokia and Lempäälä, as well as on regional trains up until the town of Orivesi. Alongside VR conductors, ticket inspectors employed by the city of Tampere have the right to inspect tickets on and off commuter trains, as Nysse tickets have to be pre-validated on station platforms. VR and Nysse also collaborate in regard to the scheduling of each other's services.

=== In other regions ===
In Kymenlaakso, VR co-operates with the cities of Kouvola and Kotka by offering a mobile ticket which is valid both on local buses and on commuter trains between Koria and Kotka Port. Regular bus tickets or passes issued in said cities are not valid on VR commuter rail, though.

As of 2022, VR does not co-operate or collaborate with the regional transport authorities of Kanta-Häme or Päijät-Häme.

== See also ==
- Helsinki commuter rail
