= Kotka Port railway station =

Railway station in Kotka, Finland

Kotka Port Kotkan satama Kotka hamn
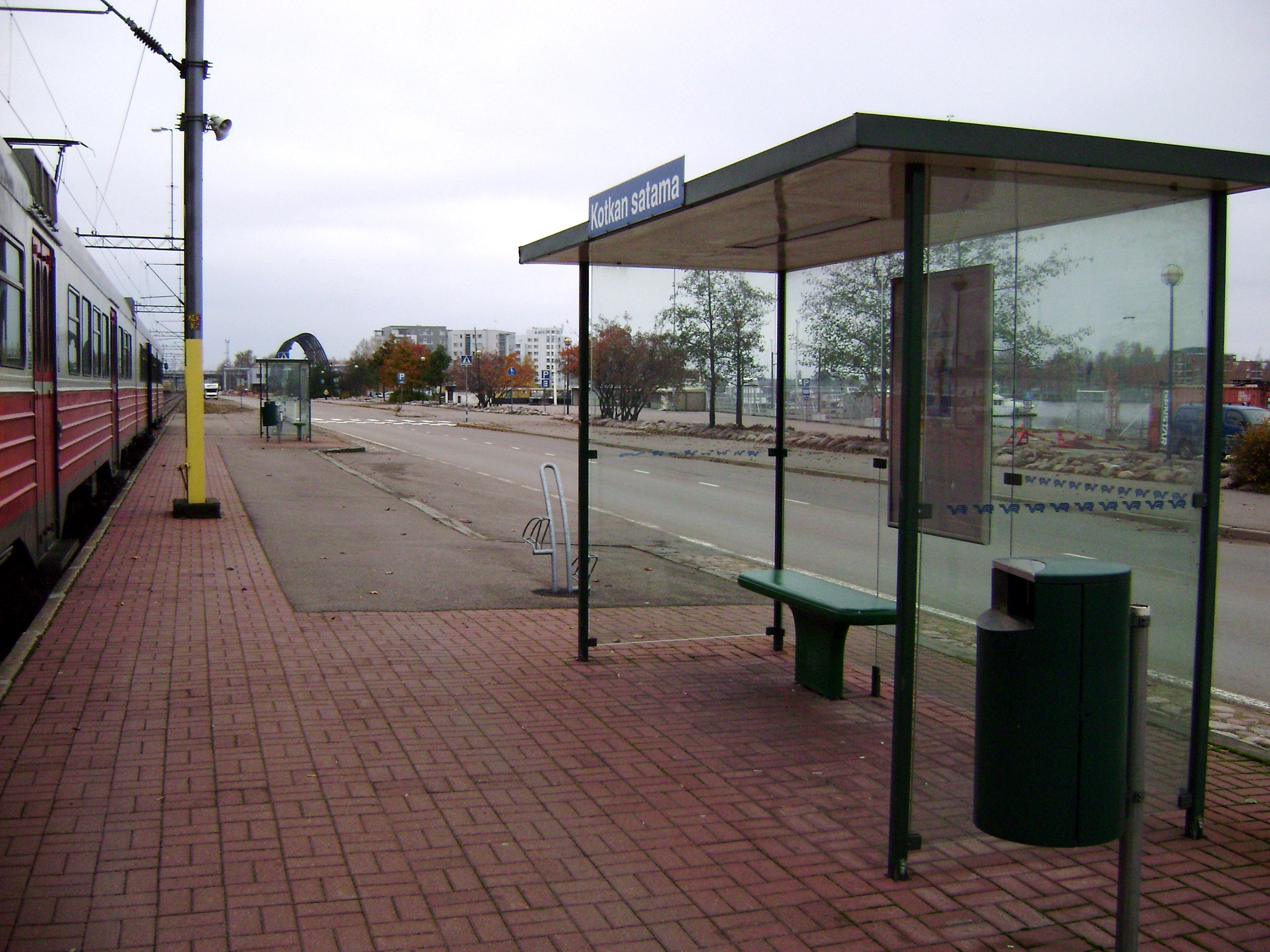

General information
- Location: Satamakatu 9; 48100 Kotka; Finland
- Coordinates: 60°28′05″N 026°56′22″E
- System: VR station
- Owner: Finnish Transport Infrastructure Agency
- Operator: VR Group
- Line: Kouvola–Kotka
- Platforms: 1 side platform

Other information
- Station code: Kts
- Classification: Part of split operating point (Kotka)

History
- Opened: 31 May 1998

Passengers
- 2008: 16,000

Services
| Preceding station | VR commuter rail | Following station |
|---|---|---|
| Kotka towards Lahti or Kouvola | O | Terminus |
Location

The Kotka Port railway station (Finnish: Kotkan sataman rautatieasema, Swedish: Kotka hamns järnvägsstation) is located in the town of Kotka, Finland, right by its namesake, the Kotka ferry terminal.

Kotka Port is followed by Kotka station, located around 800 metres (0.50 mi) to the west. Despite such naming, Kotka Port is somewhat nearer to the actual center of Kotka, also being the initial reason for the station's inception. Furthermore, its location makes it possible for passengers to transfer to and from Baltic Sea ferries.

Kotka Port is the origin of VR commuter rail line O and the southern terminus of the Kotka Line from Kouvola.

== History ==
A railway stop called Satamakatu – in use from 1932 to 1938 and situated about 200 metres (660 ft) further east – can be considered an early predecessor of the modern Kotka Port station. A footpath leading across the tracks is the only remaining feature of the former halt.

The current station originated as an summertime experiment in the early 1990s to take passengers closer to the centre of events during the annual Kotka Maritime Festival. It became a permanent full-time station in 1998 and has since functioned as the southern terminus of regional trains to and from Kouvola and Lahti. In 2022, regional trains serving the Kotka Line were integrated into VR commuter rail, receiving the line designation O.

The official English name of the station used to be Kotka Harbour.

=== Future plans ===
There are plans for multiple major public investment projects in and around the Port of Kotka – for example, a new campus by Xamk, the Southeastern Finland University of Applied Sciences, will be completed in 2024, less than 500 metres (550 yd) away from the station.

In a 2020 study by the Finnish Transport Infrastructure Agency regarding the future of the Kotka Line and the Hamina Line, it was stated that the possibility of service increases might justify the addition of another platform track at the station.

== Services ==
O Stopping train to Kouvola / on certain departures to Lahti
