= SM6 =

SM6, Sm6, sM6 or sm6 stands for:

- VR Class Sm6, a type of train formerly used on the Allegro service between Helsinki and Saint Petersburg
- RIM-174 Standard ERAM, a surface-to-air naval missile
- SM6 postcode area, the Sutton postcode area covering Wallington, Beddington, Hackbridge, Roundshaw and South Beddington
- Renault Talisman`s Korean name
- Titleist Golf club.
