= Sibelius (disambiguation) =

Sibelius may refer to:

- Jean Sibelius (1865–1957), Finnish composer of classical music, or his namesakes:
  - Sibelius Academy, a music university in Finland
  - Sibelius (film), a 2003 film about the composer
  - Sibelius Hall, a concert hall
  - Sibelius (scorewriter), a scorewriter program developed by Sibelius Software Limited, now part of Avid
  - Sibelius monument, a monument to the composer
  - Sibelius (train), a train that operated between Helsinki and St. Petersburg on the Riihimäki–Saint Petersburg Railway
  - 1405 Sibelius, an asteroid
- Christian Sibelius (1869–1922), Finnish physician and professor, younger brother of Jean Sibelius

== See also ==
- Sebelius, a list of people with the surname
- Sabellius, third-century theologian
- National Federation of Independent Business v. Sebelius, a landmark United States Supreme Court decision over Healthcare
