= Sibelius (train) =

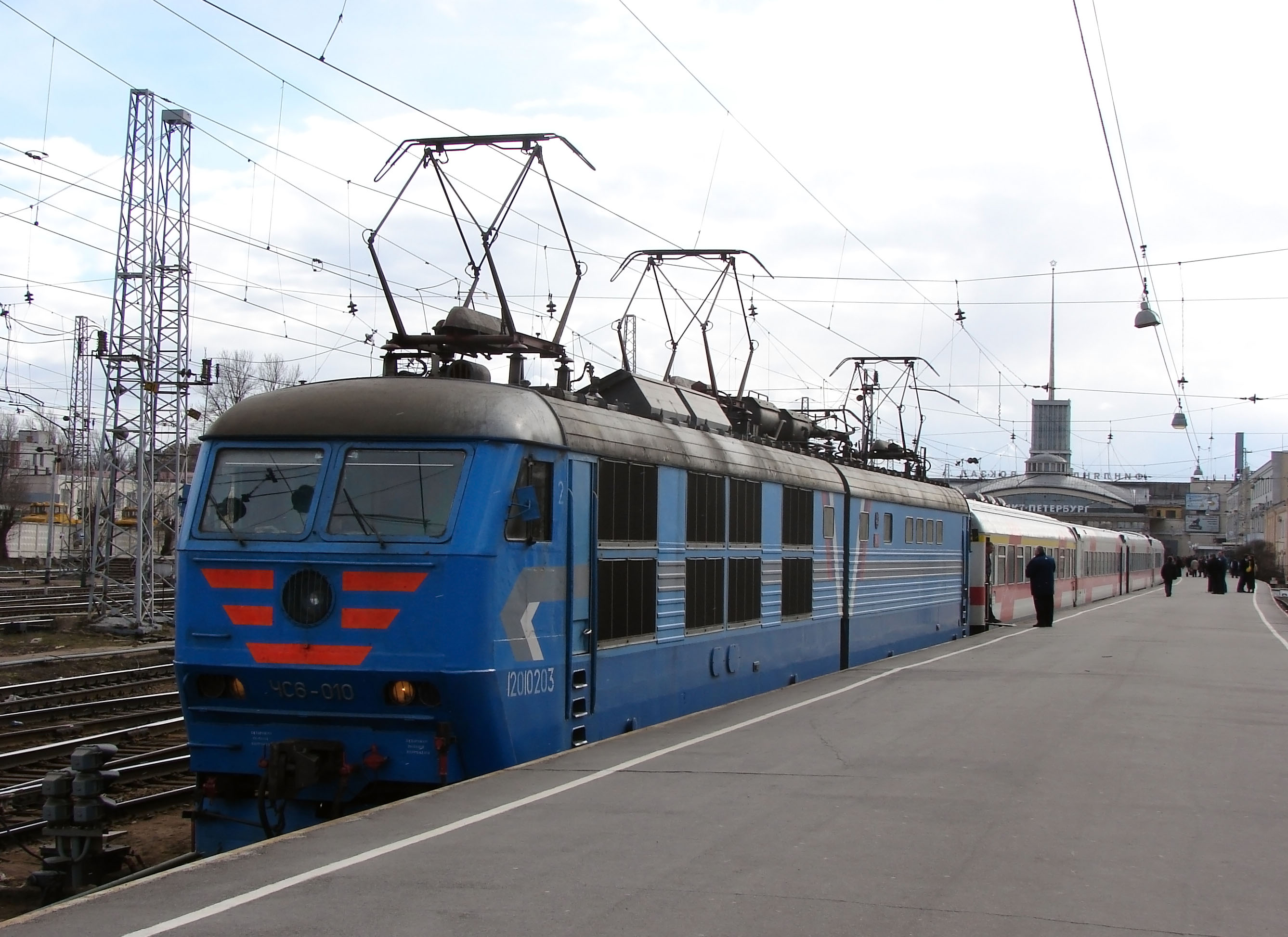
- The Sibelius at Saint Petersburg.

Overview
- Service type: Inter-city rail
- Status: Discontinued
- Locale: Russia – Finland
- First service: May 31, 1992
- Last service: December 13, 2010
- Successor: Allegro
- Former operator: VR Group

Route
- Termini: Helsinki; Saint Petersburg
- Stops: 8
- Train number: 035/036
- Line used: Riihimäki–Saint Petersburg railway

Technical
- Track gauge: In Russia: 1,520 mm (4 ft 11 27/32 in) Russian gauge In Finland: 1,524 mm (5 ft)
- Electrification: 25 kV 50 Hz AC (Finland); 3 kV DC (Russia)
- Track owners: VR Group; Russian Railways

The Sibelius was a train run daily by VR between Helsinki, Finland, and St. Petersburg, Russia. The service began on 31 May 1992 in order to ease congestion on the night service train Repin and due to the fall of the Soviet Union, where traffic was increased on the border.

The maximum speed of the train was originally 140 km/h (87 mph), and it was later raised to 160 km/h (99 mph). Travel times between the two cities were originally over 6 hours, but were dropped to 5 hours and 12 minutes in 2002 and further to 5 hours and 6 minutes in 2006.

This rail service, along with Repin, was discontinued on 12 December 2010 when it was replaced by the new high speed service Allegro. Some of the carriages of the train were supposed to be used on regular traffic between Helsinki and Joensuu on IC 5/12 starting on 31 October 2011, but their introduction was delayed until 10 January 2012 due to pending homologation from the Finnish Transport Safety Agency (TraFi). For instance, the bogies of the carriages had to be changed.

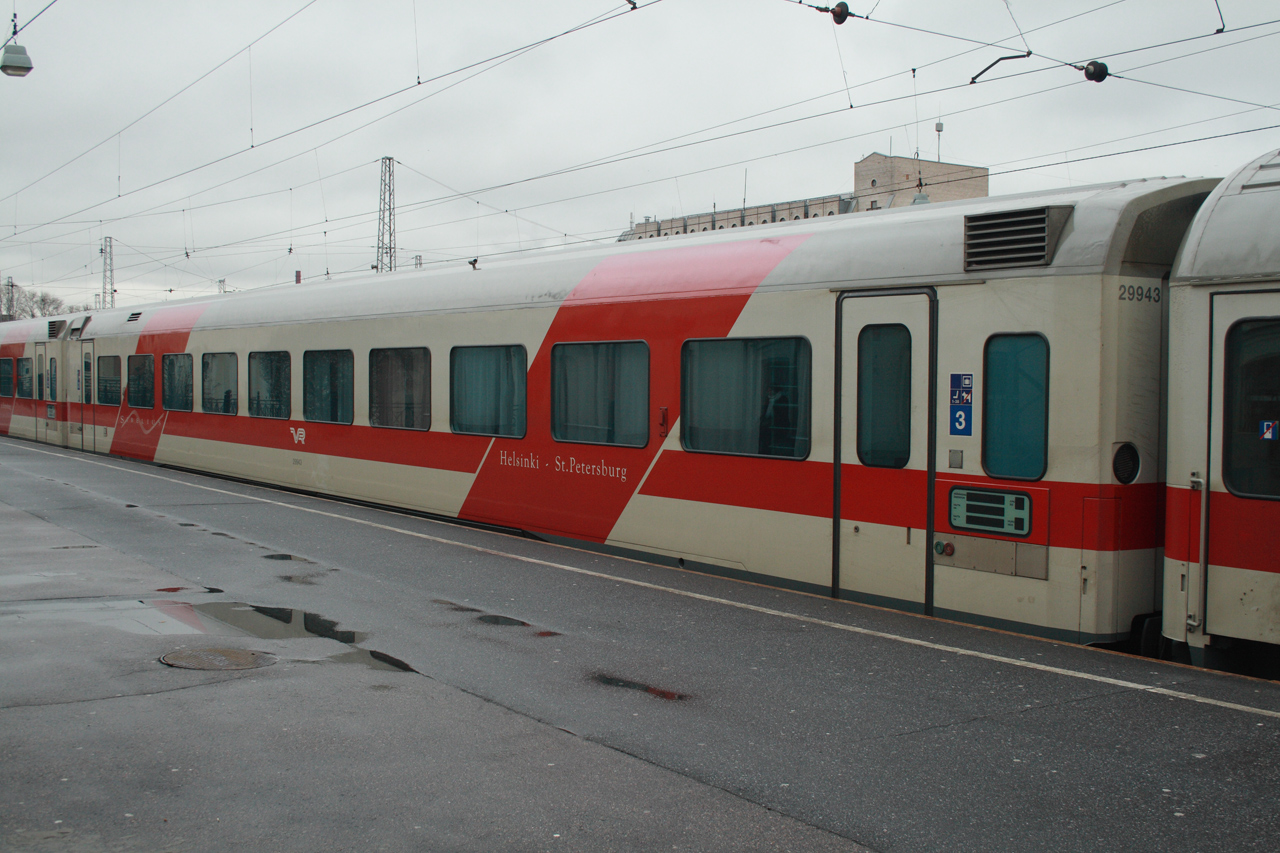
Sibelius train carriages

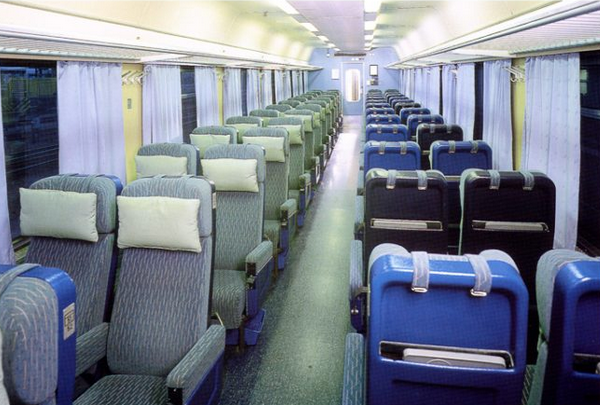
Inside the train

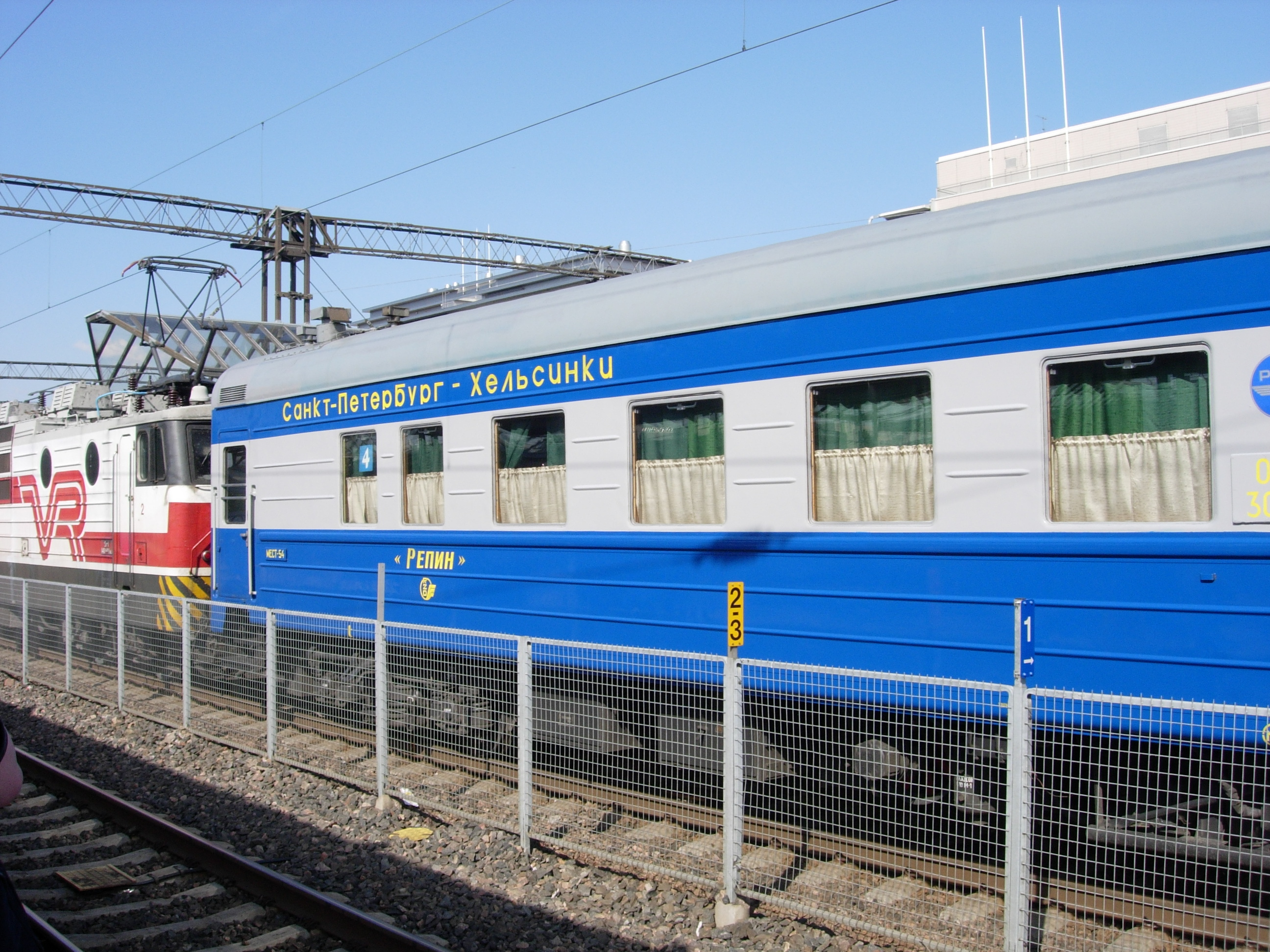
Russian Repin train carriages

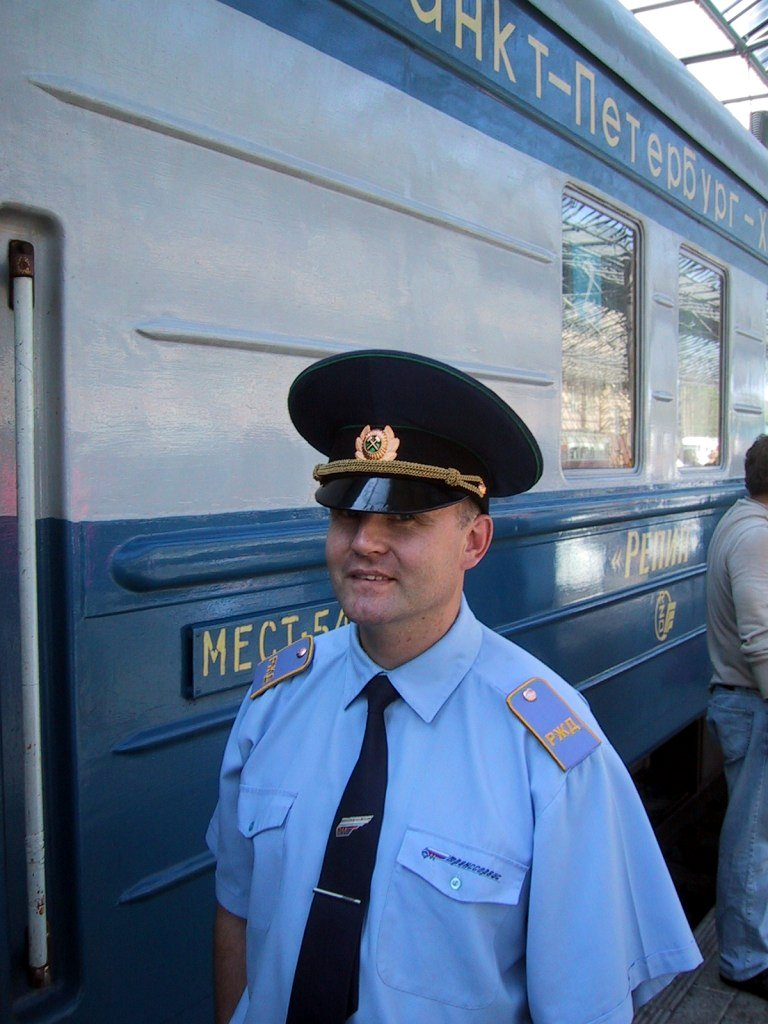
Russian conductor of the "Repin" train. From Helsinki railway station in 2002

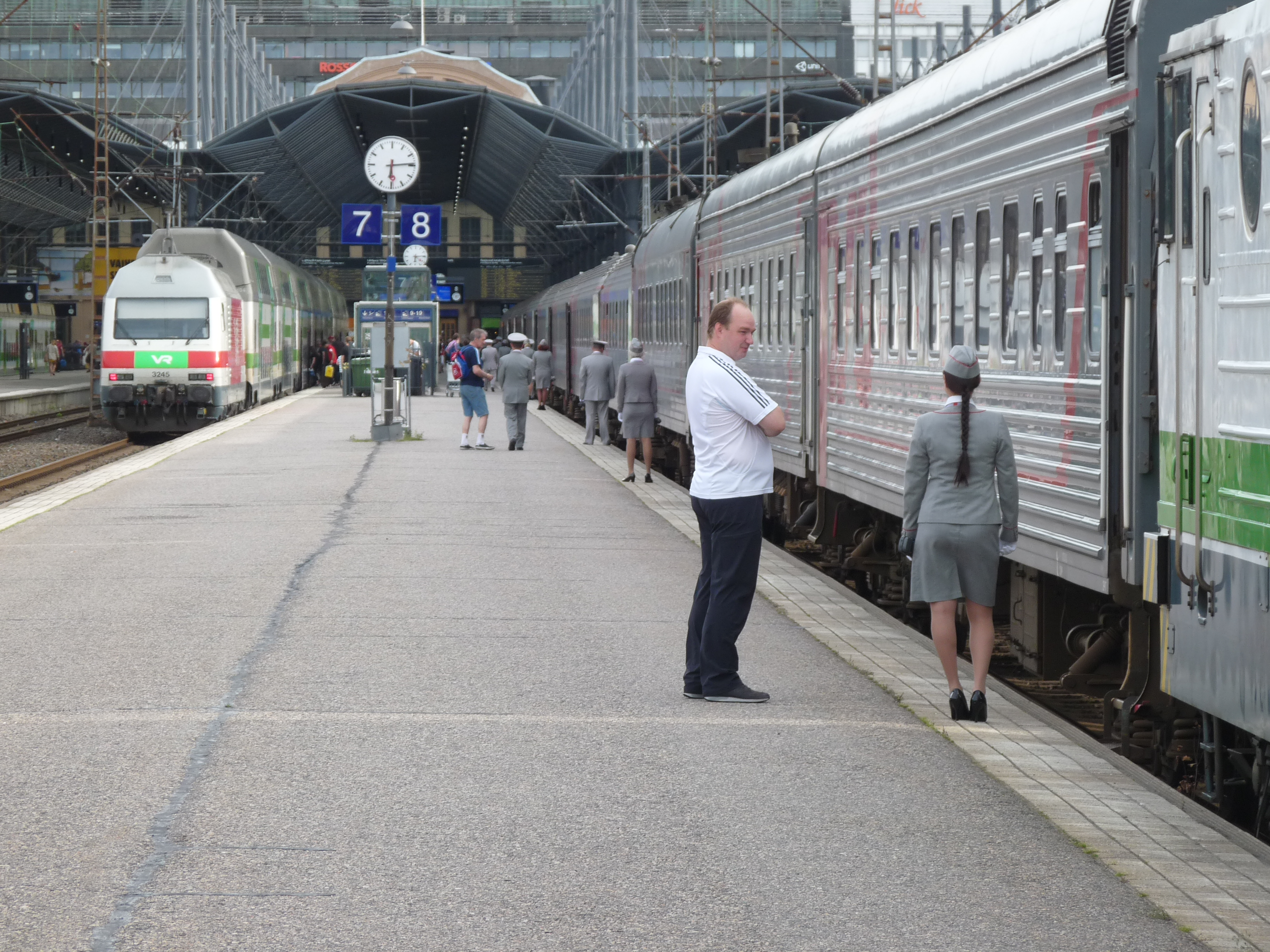
Tolstoi train which operates between Helsinki and Moscow

== See also ==
- Sm6 Allegro
