= Sebelius =

- Pronunciation: /sɪˈbiːliəs/

Origin
- Region of origin: United States

Sebelius is a surname. Notable people with the surname include:

- Kathleen Sebelius (born 1948), American politician
- Keith Sebelius (1916–1982), American politician
- K. Gary Sebelius (born 1949), United States magistrate judge

== See also ==
- Sibelius (disambiguation)
