= Vainikkala =

Village of Lappeenranta, Finland

Coordinates: 60°51′58″N 28°17′59″E

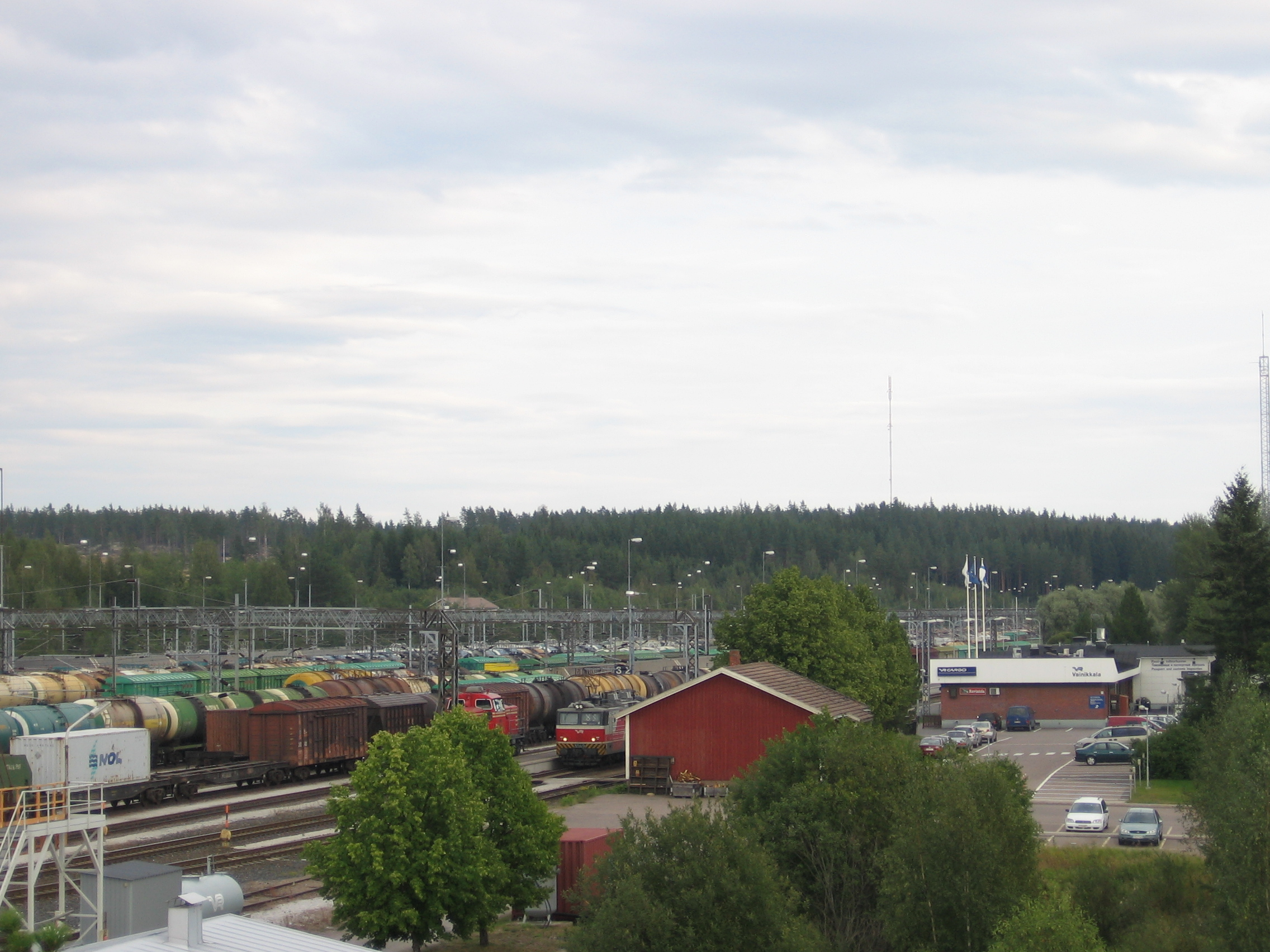
Vainikkala railway station (2007)

Vainikkala is a small village of approximately 400 inhabitants in South Karelia, Eastern Finland. It is part of the Lappeenranta municipality and is located about 29 kilometres (18 mi) south of the city centre.

Vainikkala is right on the Finnish border with Russia and the village's train station serves as an important checkpoint for Finnish border controls and customs. The train station is the junction for all passenger trains between Finland and Russia, though there are no ticket sales done in Vainikkala; the nearest ticket office is in Lappeenranta and the nearest ticket office for passage to or from Russia is in Lahti. The Allegro high-speed train service between Helsinki and Saint Petersburg stopped in Vainikkala several times per day until its discontinuation in 2022. In 2019, more than 656,000 people crossed the border at Vainikkala. The freight terminal makes Vainikkala an important node in trade between the EU and Russia.

The largest employers in Vainikkala are VR, the Finnish state passenger railway company, and Finnish Customs.

Lee Harvey Oswald entered the USSR through Vainikkala and his passport displays a stamp of the village's name.
