= Allegro (train) =

High-speed rail service in Finland and Russia

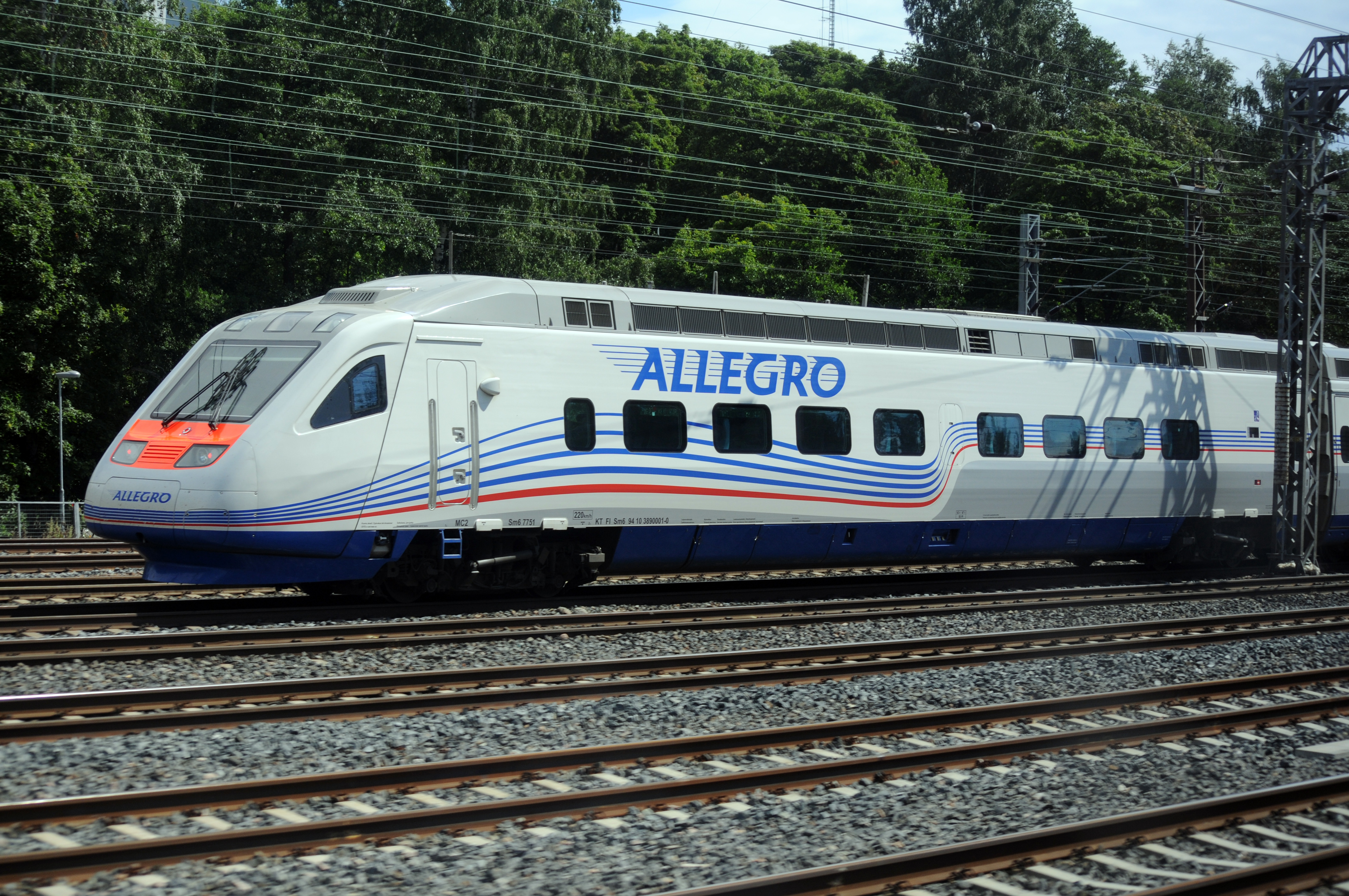
- The train at Helsinki Central Station

Overview
- Service type: High-speed rail
- Status: Ceased operation
- Locale: Russia–Finland
- Predecessor: Sibelius and Repin
- First service: December 12, 2010
- Last service: March 27, 2022
- Current operators: Karelian Trains (joint venture between VR and RZD)

Route
- Termini: Helsinki Central Station, Helsinki, Finland; Finland Station, Saint Petersburg, Russia
- Stops: 8
- Distance travelled: 407 km (253 mi)
- Average journey time: 3 h 27 min
- Service frequency: 4 rounds daily (from May 29, 2011)
- Lines used: Riihimäki–Saint Petersburg; Kerava–Lahti; Helsinki–Riihimäki

On-board services
- Classes: Business and Economy
- Seating arrangements: 341 seats

Technical
- Rolling stock: Karelian Trains Class Sm6
- Track gauge: Russian track: 1,520 mm (4 ft 11 27/32 in) Russian gauge Finnish track: 1,524 mm (5 ft)
- Operating speed: 220 km/h (140 mph)
- Track owners: Russian Railways; VR Group

Allegro was the brand name of a now defunct high-speed train service, owned by Karelian Trains as a joint venture between the Finnish VR Group and the Russian railway company Russian Railways and operated by Class Sm6 trains, between Helsinki, Finland, and St. Petersburg, Russia from 2010 to 2022.

The train stopped at eight stations, of which six were in Finland and two in Russia. The trip from Helsinki to St. Petersburg took three and a half hours and the maximum speed of the train was 220 kilometres per hour. Because of the sanctions against Russia, the train services were stopped, until the VR Group announced on December 14, 2023, that it would acquire the entire rolling stock of Allegro to itself from Russian Railways after Russian Railways had neglected its duty towards Karelian Trains. The rolling stock of Allegro has been taken into use in domestic long-distance rail traffic in Finland during 2025, under the name Pendolino Plus.

During its normal service, Allegro was used for about half a million rail journeys per year. The rolling stock consists of four units of seven carriages each, which were manufactured by Alstom in Italy.

== Traffic ==
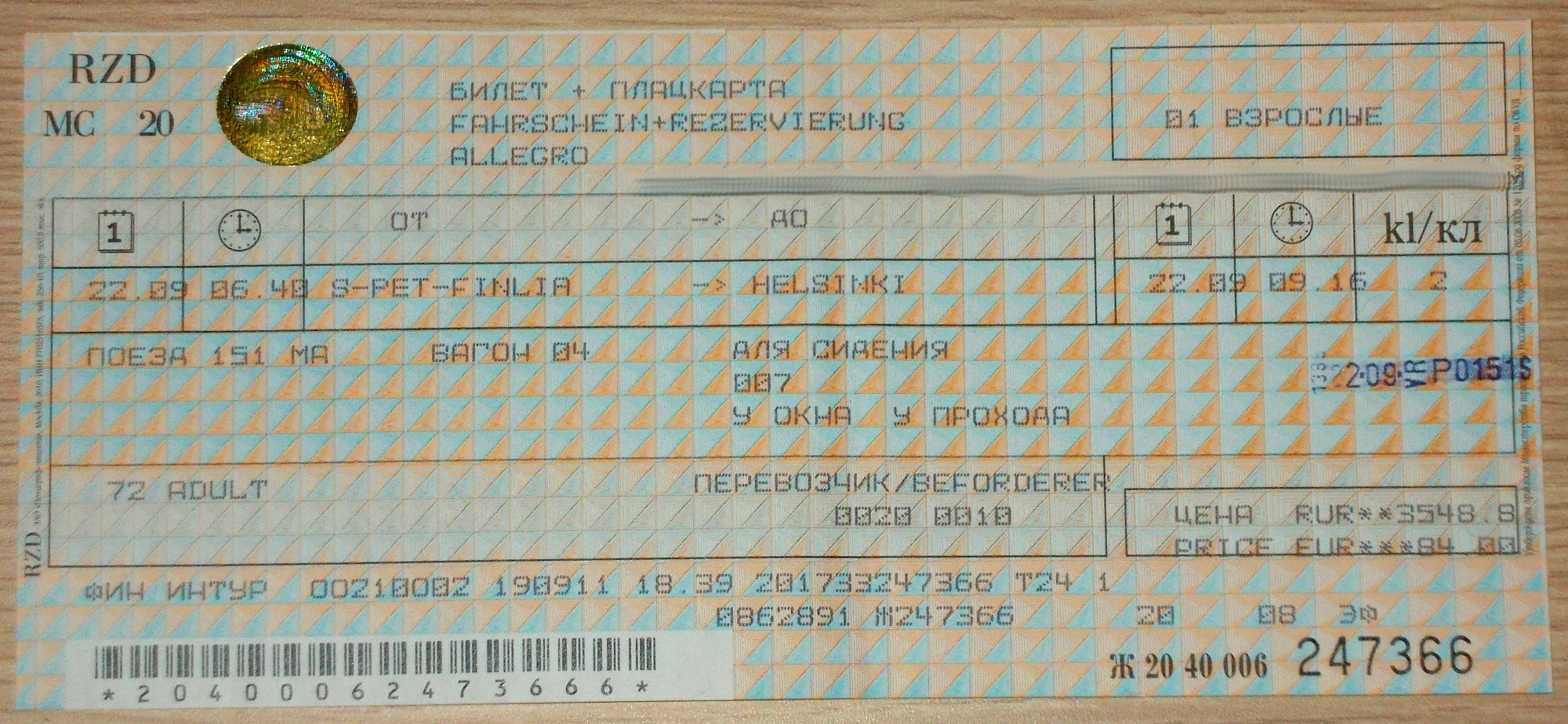
A Russian ticket for the Allegro train from Saint Petersburg to Helsinki.

After the Russian invasion of Ukraine in February 2022 and the subsequent international sanctions against Russia, services on the Allegro trains were stopped for the time being. The last services so far were on March 27, 2022. According to the state of Finland, traffic on the Allegro trains no longer served a purpose. Allegro was the last direct rail connection between Russia and the European Union.

The Allegro service operated between the Helsinki Central railway station in Finland and the Finland Station in St. Petersburg in Russia. The trains stopped at Pasila, Tikkurila, Lahti, Kouvola, Vainikkala and Vyborg. The trains skipped Pasila railway station from 2016 to 2020, shortening the travel time by 9 minutes. In 2018 the travel time was 3 hours and 27 minutes. The final intent was to cut the travel time down to three hours. Border inspections on the Allegro were performed while the train was on the move, as its passengers remained seated. Passengers also had the possibility for currency exchange on board the train. The Allegro had 342 seats and two seats for disabled people.

== History ==
The service started on December 12, 2010. The aim was to reduce travel time between Helsinki and Saint Petersburg: before Allegro, the journey time was 5½ hours; it became 3 hours and 27 minutes over a journey of 220 km (140 mi) and there were plans to bring it down to 3 hours. The name Allegro is a musical term for a quick tempo, thereby suggesting "high speed". On board the inaugural service were Finnish president Tarja Halonen and Russian prime minister Vladimir Putin.

The service was suspended between March 18, 2020, and December 11, 2021, due to the COVID-19 pandemic. Service resumed with restrictions on December 12, 2021.

During the 2022 Russian financial crisis, in the aftermath of international sanctions placed on Russian companies following the 2022 Russian invasion of Ukraine, the Allegro train became a primary means for people to leave Russia. As European airspace had been closed to Russian planes, and Russian airspace was closed to European planes, the train was the only passenger connection between Russia and the European Union. EU authorities asked VR to keep this train running so that those wishing to leave Russia could do so (though as part of COVID-19 restrictions, only Finnish and Russian citizens were allowed to use the train, and it ran only twice a day at half-capacity, of 327 passengers; but operators worked to lift those restrictions in order to allow the evacuation of other nationals). The service was suspended on March 27, 2022, due to the aforementioned sanctions.

In December 2023, it was announced that VR Group had assumed the financial obligations of the joint stock company that used to run Allegro since it could no longer meet them itself. VR Group plans to reuse the rolling stock in domestic operations.

== Route ==
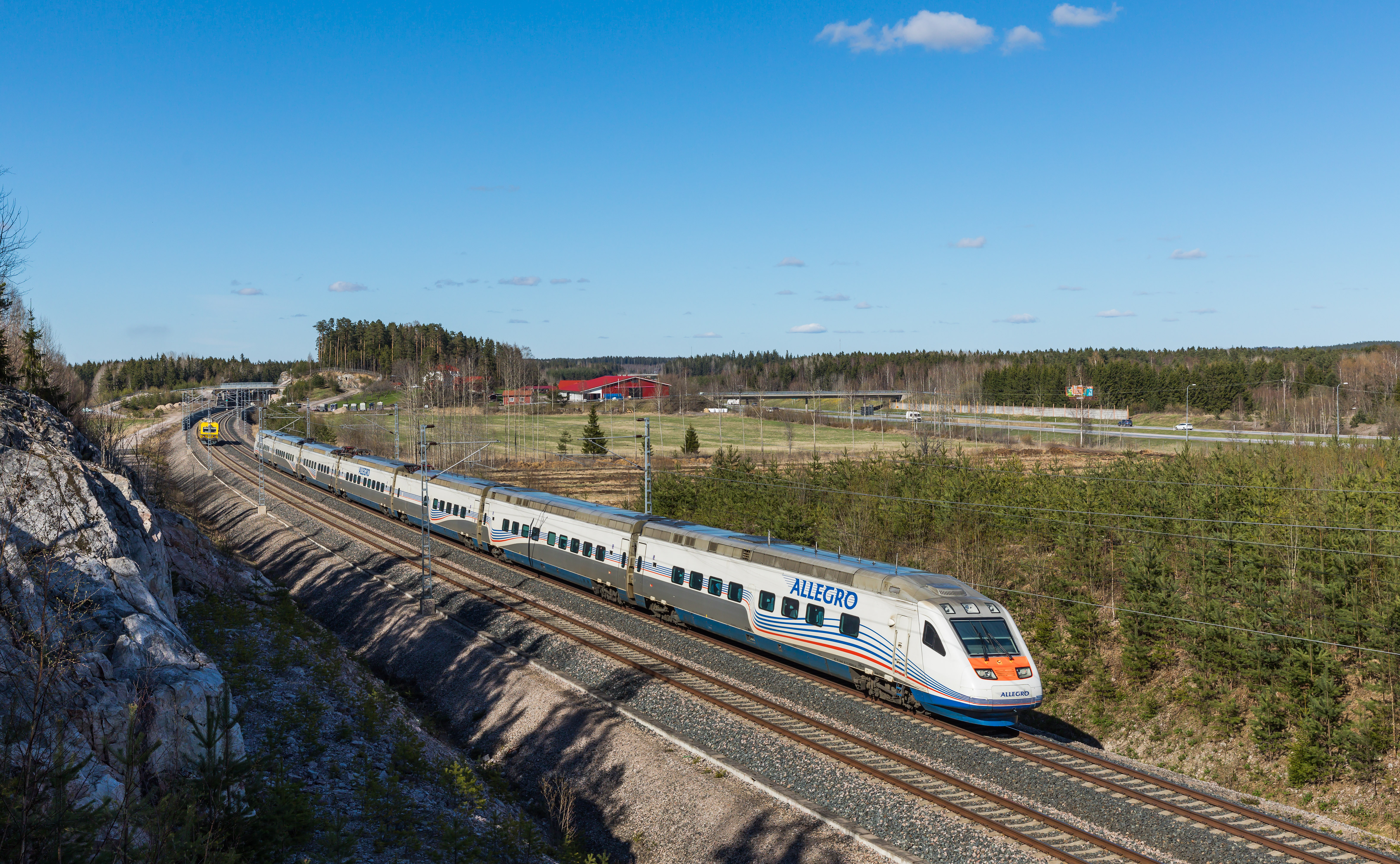
Helsinki - Saint Petersburg service

Allegro connected the following stations:

- St. Petersburg (Finlyandsky station)
- Vyborg (Vyborg railway station)
- Vainikkala
- Kouvola (Kouvola railway station)
- Lahti (Lahti railway station)
- Tikkurila
- Helsinki (Central Station)

The trains also stopped previously in Pasila like every other passenger train from and to Helsinki, but this stop was discontinued between March 27, 2016, and December 11, 2021, when the stop in Pasila was revived.

Vainikkala (on the Finnish side of the border) and Vyborg are special stations: on trains bound for Finland, passengers are not allowed to leave the train at Vyborg, as the train only stops to pick up passengers; and on trains bound for Russia, passengers are not allowed to leave the train at Vainikkala, for the same reason.

=== Border controls ===
On board the train, each passenger was visited by Finnish Border Guard and customs officers, as well as their Russian counterparts. Finnish border control took place while the train was travelling between Kouvola and Vainikkala, while Russian border control took place while the train was travelling between Vyborg and St Petersburg. If boarding/exiting at Vainikkala or Vyborg, the checks took place inside these stations.

== Vehicles ==
The Allegro service was operated using Class Sm6 electric multiple unit trainsets built by Alstom, with a top speed of 220 km/h (140 mph). VR has announced that they have seized full control of the trains and would begin using them on domestic services in 2025.

The Sm6 appeared externally similar to VR's earlier Sm3 Pendolino series, but was based on the fourth generation 'Pendolino Nuovo' or 'New Pendolino' designs and its construction differed from the Sm3 in many ways.

== On board services ==
- Food: there is a restaurant coach, which serves food during the whole journey, except during customs inspection.
- Currency exchange: there is an agent walking constantly back and forth on the train offering currency exchange services.
- Children's area: there is an area where small children can play.
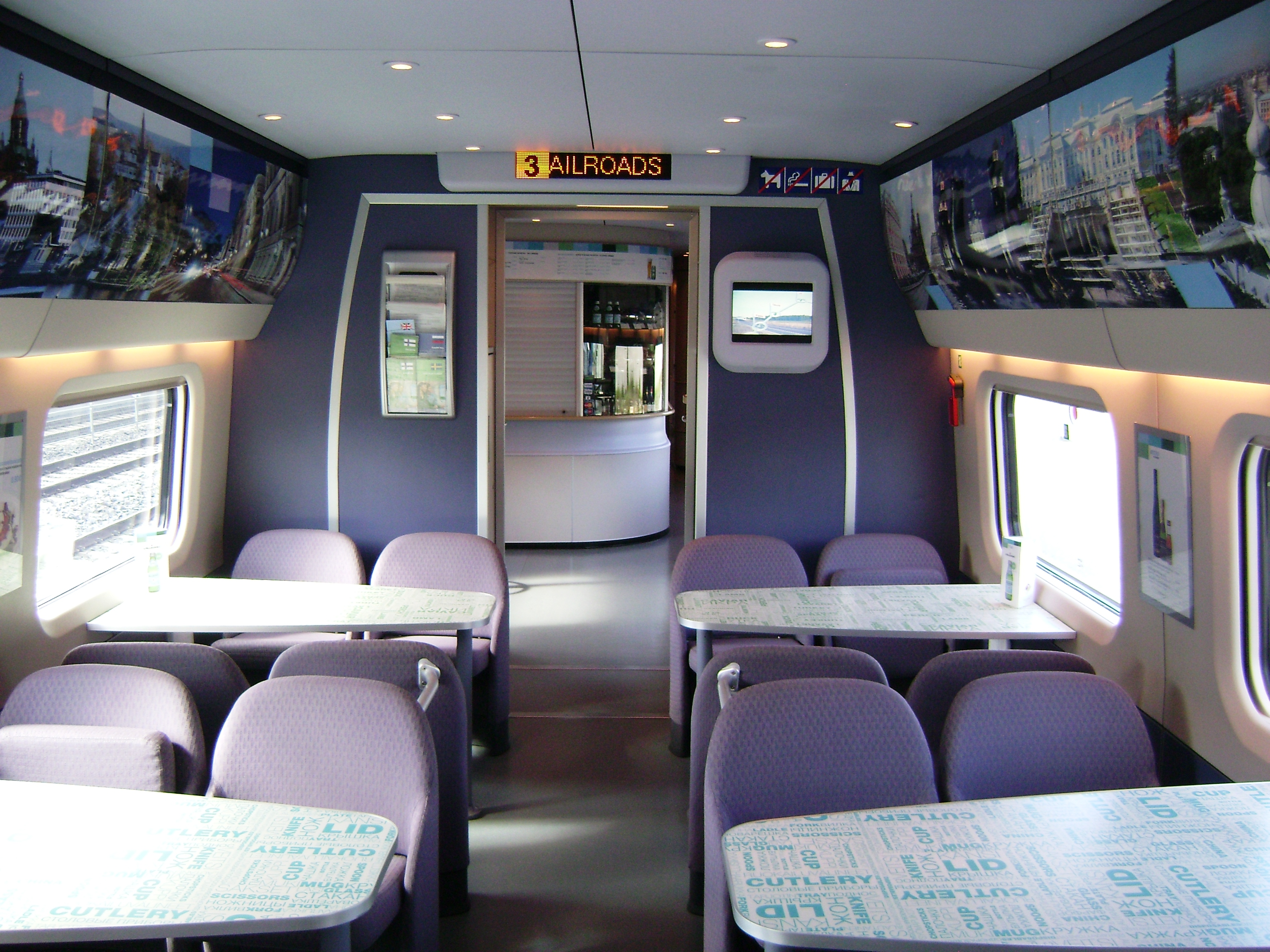
Restaurant coach (before refurbishment)

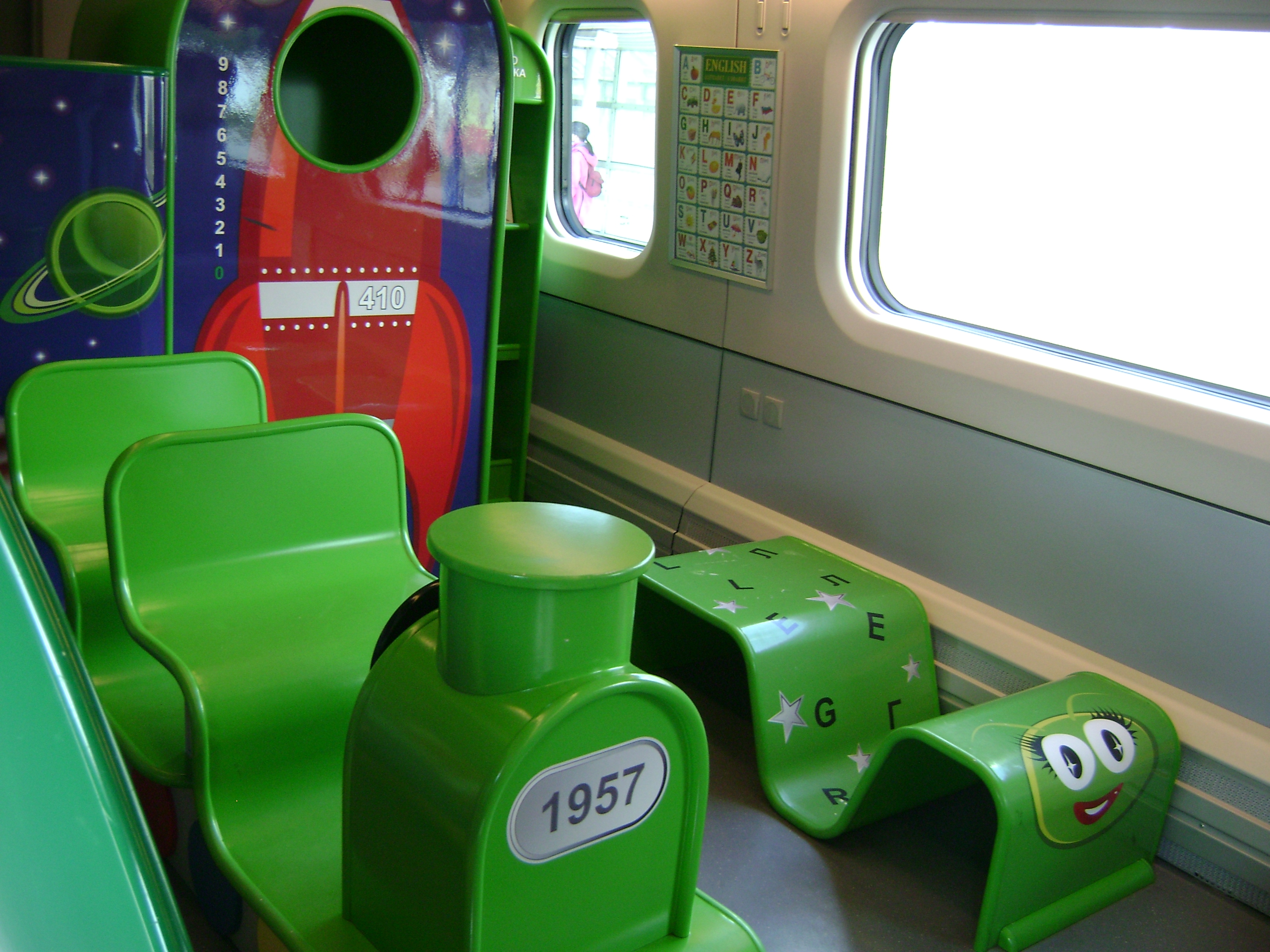
Children's area (before refurbishment)

== See also ==
- List of high speed trains
