= VR Class Sm3 =

Finnish high-speed Pendolino train

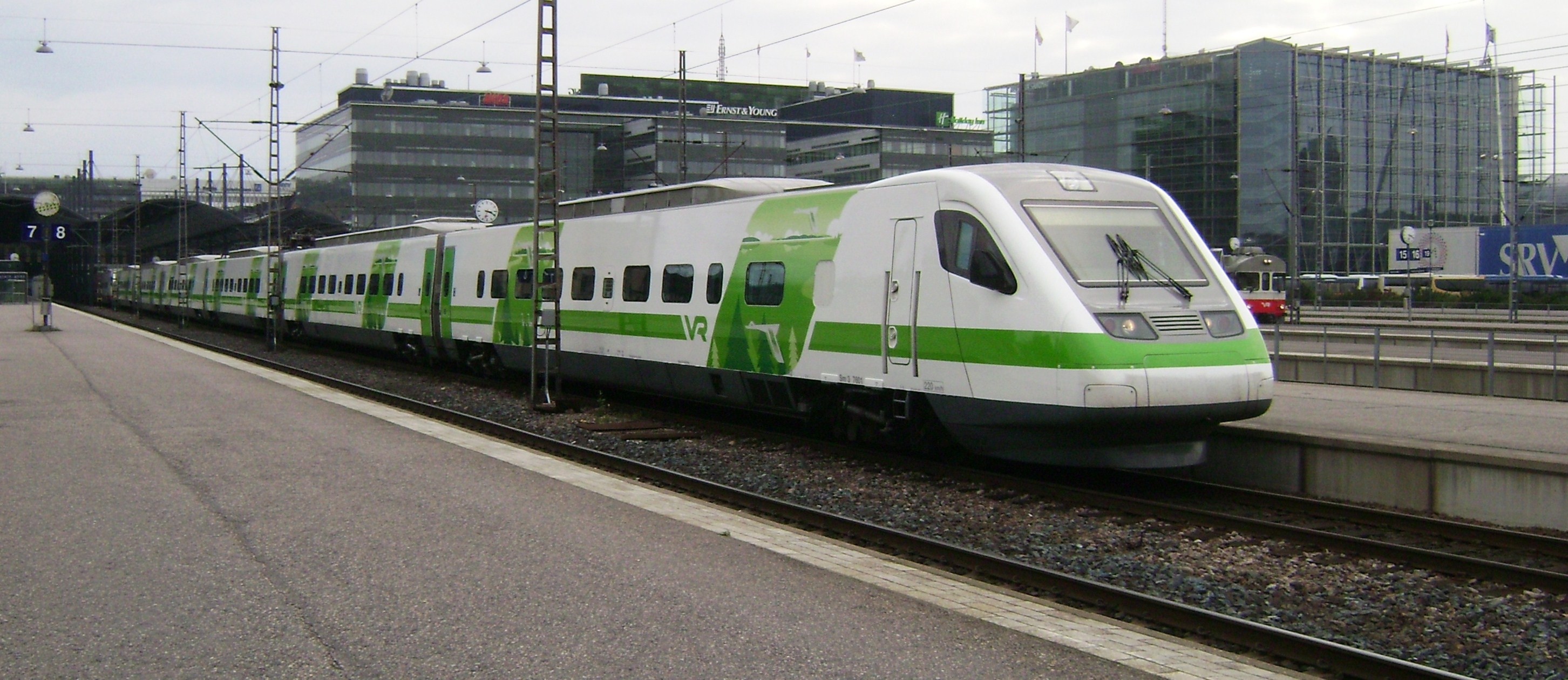
- An Sm3 at Helsinki Central railway station in VR's new green/white livery.

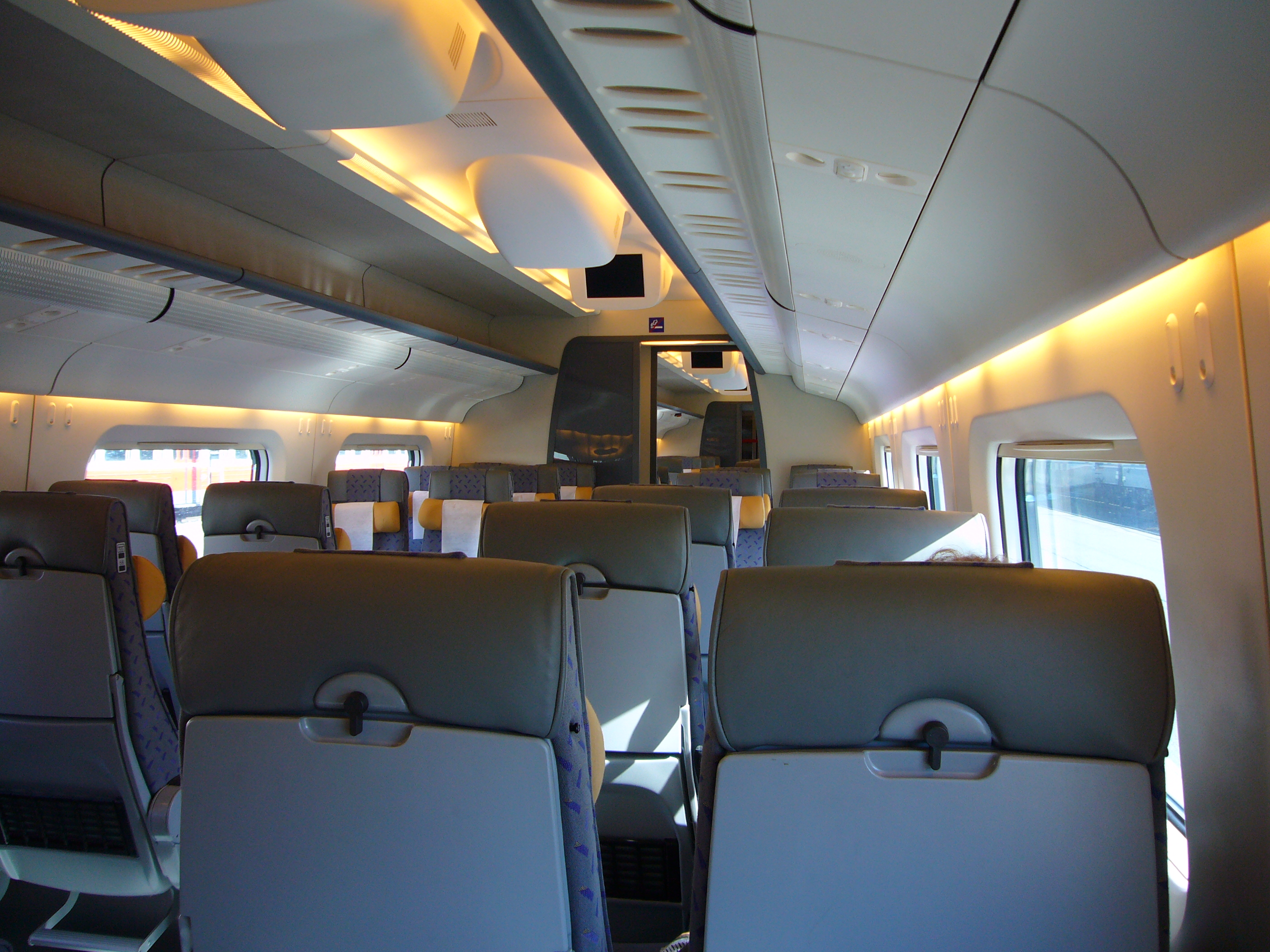
- The interior of a CM class carriage.
- Manufacturers: Fiat Ferroviaria, Rautaruukki-Transtech
- Family name: Pendolino
- Constructed: 7x01–7x02: 1992–1994; 7x03–7x10: 1997–2002; 7x11–7x18: 2002–2006
- Entered service: 7x01–7x02: 1995; 7x03–7x10: 2000–2002; 7x11–7x18: 2004–2006
- Number built: 18 six-carriage units
- Number in service: 14 units
- Fleet numbers: 7x03-7x12, 7x14-7x15, 7x17-7x18 (Note: The trains do not have a train-specific fleet number; instead, each carriage has its own number, 1 being the first car and 6 the last. Unit "7x01" then consists of cars number 7101, 7201, 7301, 7401, 7501 and 7601.)
- Capacity: 309 seats
- Operator: VR Group

Specifications
- Train length: 158.90 m (521 ft 4 in)
- Width: 3.2 m (10 ft 6 in)
- Height: 3.73 m (12 ft 3 in)
- Floor height: 1,270 mm (50.0 in)
- Platform height: 550 mm (21.7 in) (platform)
- Maximum speed: 220 km/h (140 mph)
- Weight: 328 t (323 long tons; 362 short tons)
- Axle load: 14.3 t (14.1 long tons; 15.8 short tons)
- Traction motors: 8 × 500 kW (670 hp)
- Power output: 4,000 kW (5,400 hp)
- Acceleration: 0–100 km/h (0–62 mph): 57 s: (0.5 m/s^{2} or 1.6 ft/s^{2}); 0–200 km/h (0–124 mph): 193 s (0.37 m/s^{2} or 1.2 ft/s^{2})
- Deceleration: 140–0 km/h (87–0 mph): 39 s (−1.01 m/s^{2} or −3.3 ft/s^{2}); 200–0 km/h (124–0 mph): 59 s (−0.94 m/s^{2} or −3.1 ft/s^{2})
- Electric system: 25 kV 50 Hz AC
- Current collection: Pantograph
- UIC classification: (1A)(A1)+(1A)(A1)+2′2′+2′2′+(1A)(A1)+(1A)(A1)
- Safety system: ATP-VR/RHK
- Track gauge: 1,524 mm (5 ft)

The Sm3 Pendolino (originally branded as Pendolino S220, and usually referred to simply as the Pendolino) is a class of high-speed body-tilting trains operated by VR Group. It is a member of the Pendolino train family; its design is based on the ETR 460. The first two trainsets were assembled in Finland by Rautaruukki-Transtech in the mid-1990s. The rest of the series of eighteen EMUs were built by Fiat Ferroviaria (later Alstom) between 2000 and 2006. The trains serve most of Finland's major cities such as Helsinki, Turku, Oulu and Joensuu with a maximum speed of 220 km/h (140 mph), although this speed is only attained between Kerava and Lahti. The train has a power output of 4,000 kW (5,400 hp) and weighs 328 tonnes (323 long tons; 362 short tons).

The Sm3 had a long prototype phase before the main series was ordered, with reliability issues being brought up by the press from time to time. Negative reporting continues to haunt the series' reputation. Reliability problems cannot be proven, as no statistics of specific train types are available. The train has not managed to cope with harsh Finnish weather conditions, and the time benefit of the tilting mechanism has not been taken into account since the timetables of winter 2011–2012. Nevertheless, the Sm3 has also received positive feedback from passengers and has led to increased operating speeds on the Finnish rail network.

== History ==
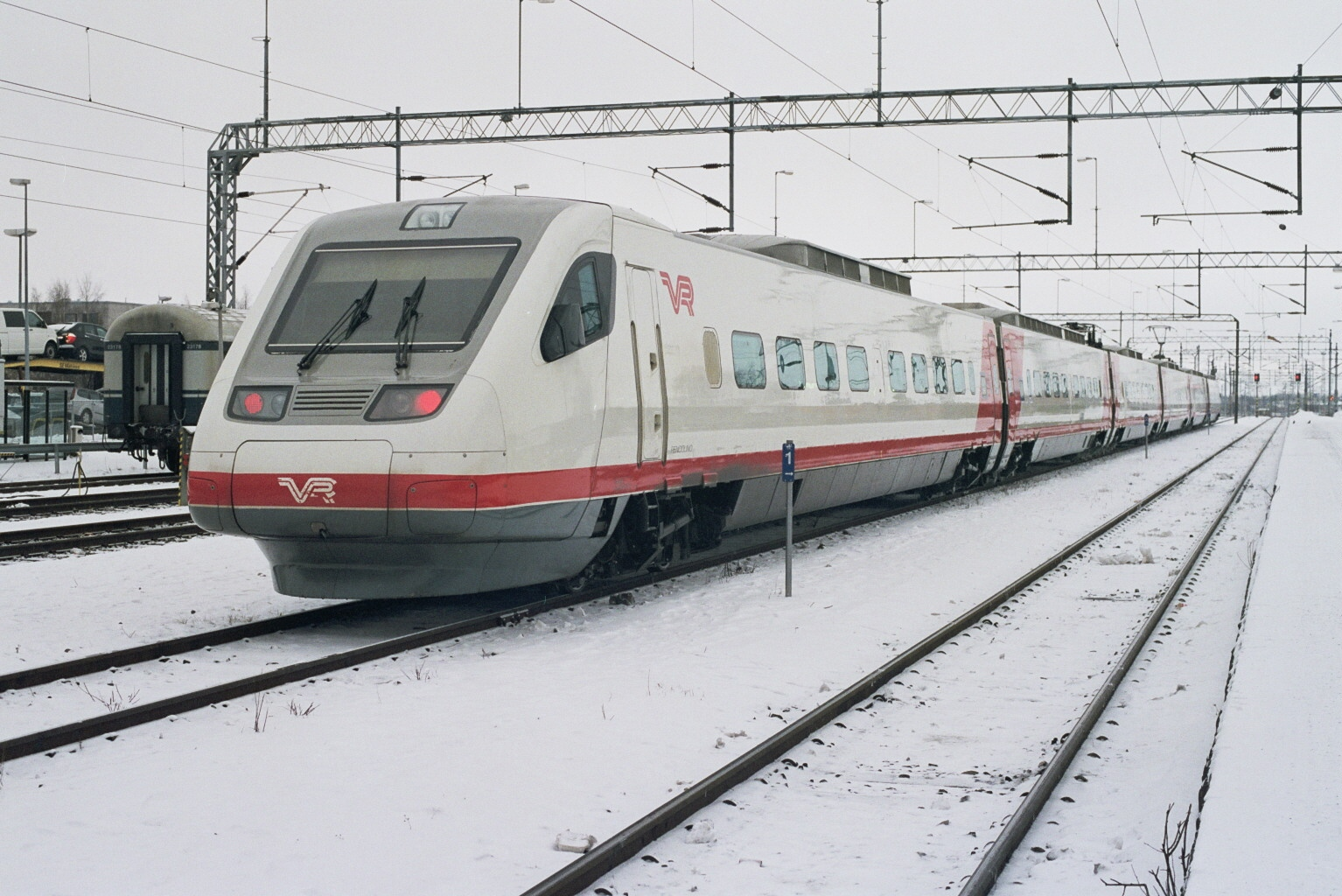
An Sm3 unit at Oulu in the series' original red/white livery.

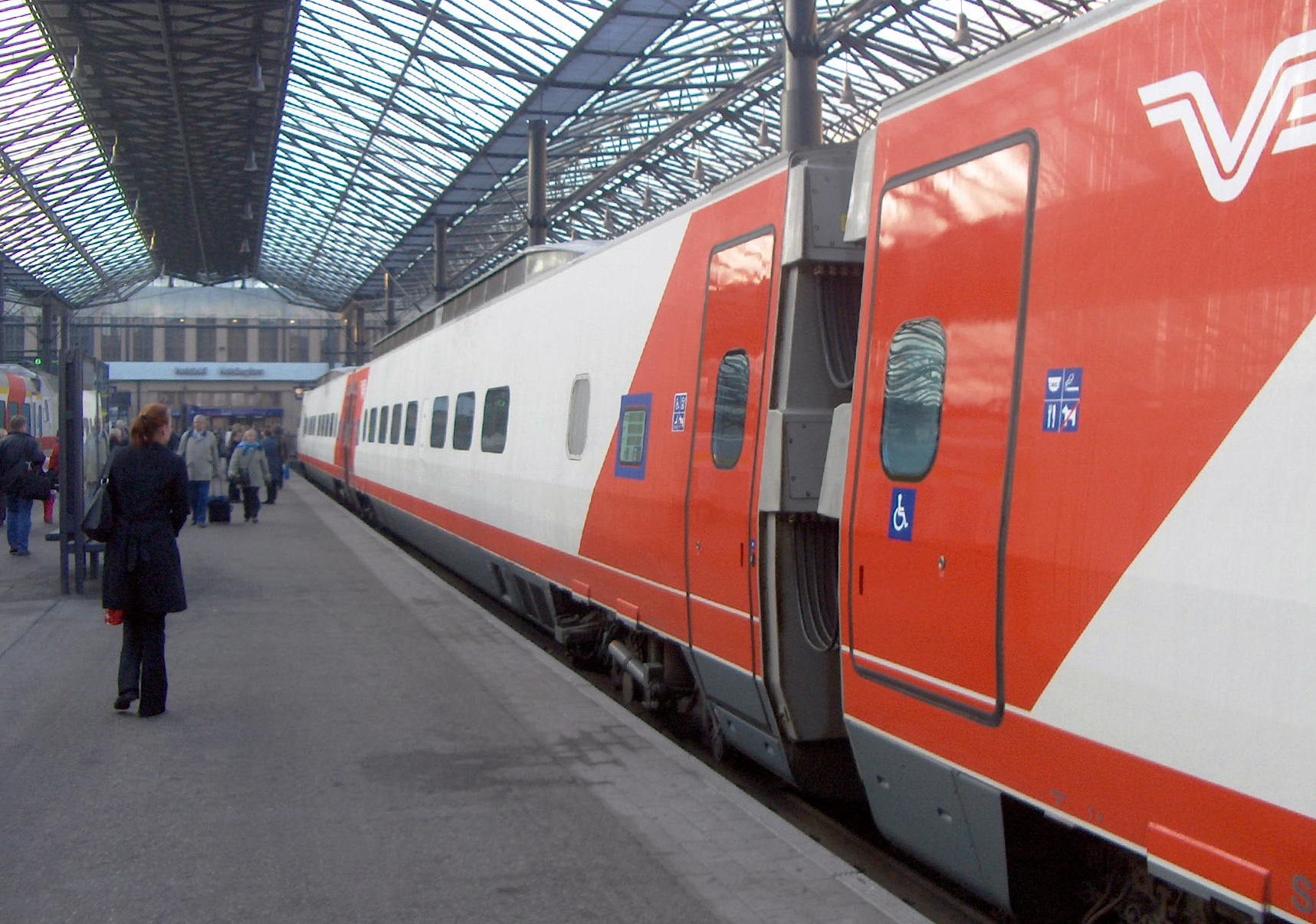
A Pendolino at Helsinki Central railway station.

=== 1992: Ordering ===
VR announced its 2 billion Finnish Mark Pendolino order on 7 February 1992, consisting of two firm orders and twenty-three options. ABB's X 2000 and the Talgo Pendular were considered in addition to the Italian train; the latter was chosen due to its lower price (70 million FIM per unit) and because it was already running. Only these two tilting trains were considered due to the twisting nature of Finland's railway network. Thanks to its tilting mechanism, the Pendolino – unlike such other European high-speed trains like the TGV, Thalys, and AVE – does not need to run on specialised high-speed lines, which was important to VR; instead, it runs on existing lines, and was expected to surpass the speed attained by traditional trains by 35%. This has both beneficial and negative consequences. The trains cannot run at as high a speed as, for example, the TGV, due to the lines. However, the Pendolino can also run alongside normal non-tilting trains, allowing for greater use of the railway. Building trains that could ensure passenger comfort at high speed on these routes by tilting through the curves was seen as a much cheaper solution than reconstructing the railway network itself due to Finland's low population and long distances. The train was originally called the Sm200, but in May 1995 it was officially named Sm3 according to VR's nomenclature for multiple units.

It was expected that the train would, as in Italy, run at a maximum speed of 250 km/h (160 mph) and significantly shorten the travel times between major cities. As an example, the 2-hour and 7-minute travel time between Helsinki and Turku was expected to drop to 1:28 by 2010; however, the top speed of the train was limited to 220 km/h (140 mph) and the advertised times were never achieved. As of July 2011, 1:44 is the fastest train link between the two cities (on the S126).

=== 1993–1997: Testing the prototypes ===
A test carriage from an ETR 460 arrived by boat into Finland from Italy in March 1993. It was used to test how the Pendolino would cope with Finland's winter and rail network by running it in Northern Karelia between Nurmes and Vieki. The carriage had to be fitted with new bogies over night at Hanko as it was designed for standard gauge instead of the broader Finnish 1,524 mm (5 ft) gauge. Another carriage was built by Transtech according to the specifications of the new train (nomenclature KOEV from koevaunu, test carriage). It was later included in the first completed unit as the fourth car, TT 7401. Before a full trainset was finished, some test runs were made with only the first three carriages of the train in late 1994.

The first finished train was unveiled to the press on 14 October 1994, and the first two trainsets started their regular test traffic on 27 November 1995 between Helsinki and Turku on the coastal track. Test traffic was stopped only after three months, at the end of February 1996, due to technical difficulties with the trains. Testing later resumed, and VR announced in 1997 that it would start normal operations with the Pendolino despite electrical problems. The ability of the train to cope with the Finnish winter was put into question, but VR denied that coldness had been a factor in the electrical failures.

=== 1997–2006: The main series ===
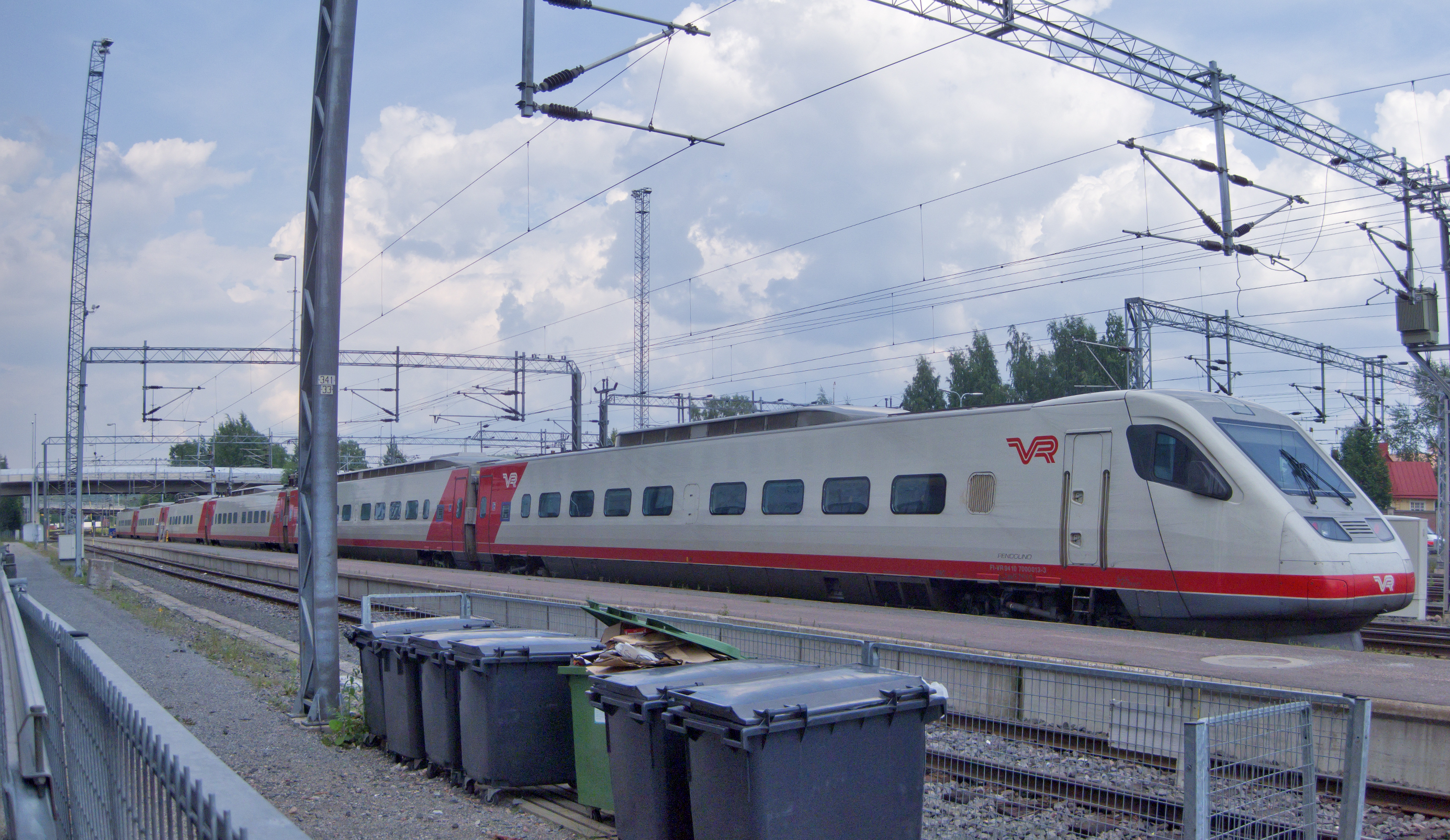
Unit 7x13, one of the final Sm3 series trains, at a service platform at Jyväskylä.

Testing ended in August 1997, after the two trainsets had covered a total of 815,000 kilometres (506,000 mi) during 3,870 trips between Helsinki and Turku. Only six of three thousand journeys were terminated due to technical issues. VR's CEO Henri Kuitunen was positive about the new train in 1998, stating that passengers feel it has been a good purchase. Passenger numbers rose by 17% between Helsinki and Turku in 1997.

Eight additional Pendolinos were ordered at the end 1997 at the price of FIM 77 million per train (€13 million). They were delivered between 2000 and 2002. The main series trains differed in various ways from the prototypes. The new trains allowed Pendolino traffic to extend: they started running between Helsinki and Jyväskylä on 22 October 2001. In June 2002, the network was expanded further, and routes were continued from Tampere onwards to Oulu and from Jyväskylä to Kuopio. One of the main series trains (number 7x08) was damaged during maritime transport in October 2001. The badly secured train had come loose during a storm on the Atlantic, almost causing the loss of M/S Traden, the ship carrying it. Thanks to good actions of the ship's crew, it was able to reach Le Havre and the train was sent back to Italy to be repaired.

Not all passengers were happy with the new train. In 2005, a delegation of commuters between Helsinki and Tampere collected criticism from fellow passengers on the Internet and delivered it to VR's head of passenger transport Antti Jaatinen. The delegation's leader, Kaj-Erik Fohlin, had made 30 trips between the two cities in January 2005 using the Pendolino, 12 of which had been on schedule.

The last eight trains were ordered in 2002 and delivered in 2004–2006, finalising the fleet of 18 trains. At that point it had become clear that the speed limits on the rail network were mostly too low for the trains to run at their maximum operating speed, even though they were chosen specifically to prevent the costly work of straightening existing lines. Work on lines has continued, and, on modernised lines, the speed difference between the Pendolino and non-tilting trains has become minimal. The Sm3 was able to attain its maximum operating speed in regular traffic only in 2006, when a new rail line was opened between Kerava and Lahti and the full Pendolino fleet was available.

=== 2006 onwards: The New Train Era ===
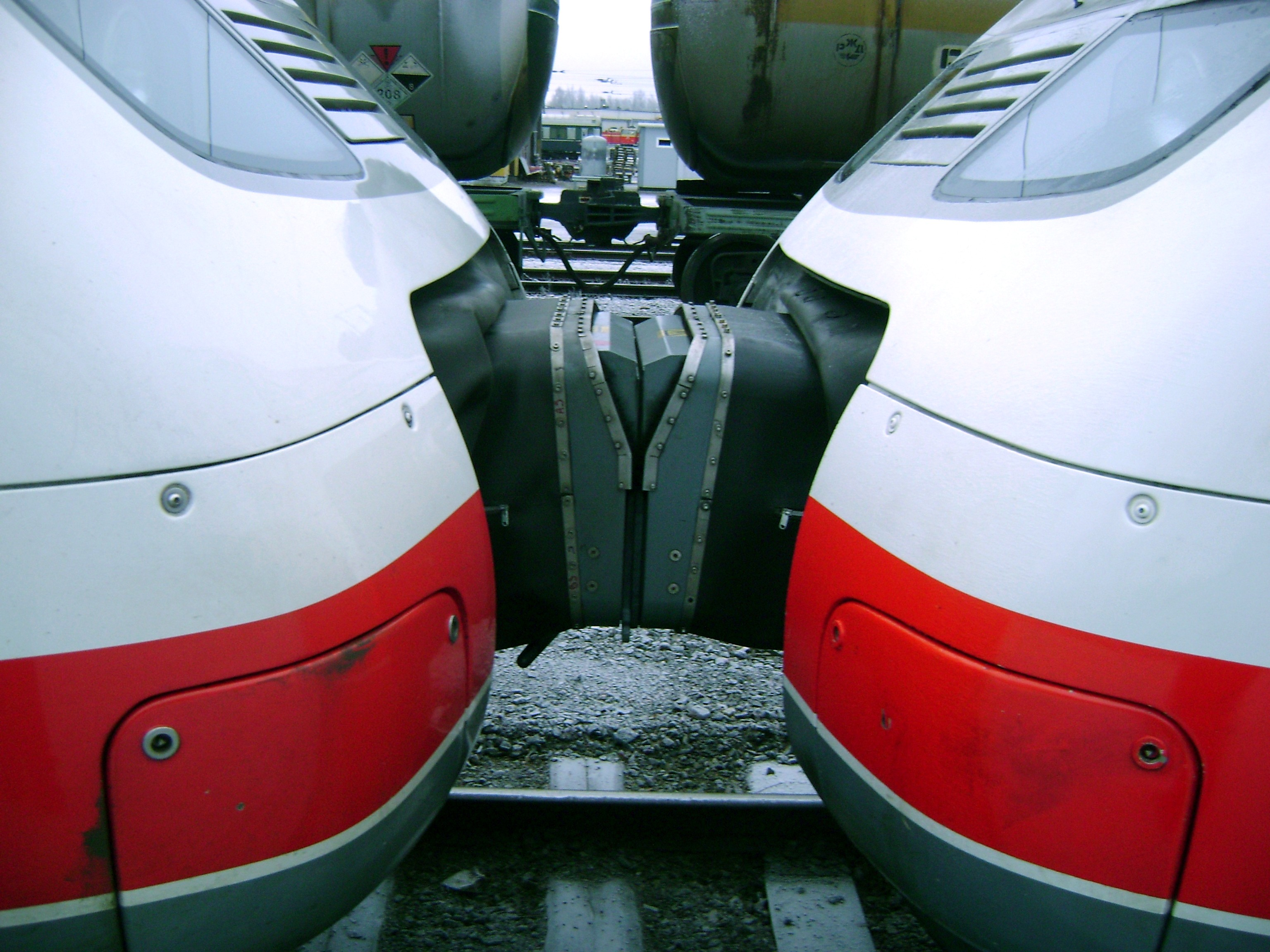
Two Pendolino trains coupled.

VR advertised the arrival of the full Pendolino fleet with the slogan "New Train Era" (Finnish: Uusi juna-aika). It started on 3 September 2006, when the line between Kerava and Lahti was officially opened and timetables changed to take the full potential of the Sm3 into account. Travel times between Helsinki and eastern Finland were cut by up to an hour.

The Pendolino has received bad publicity since the first units were taken in service for its serious reliability issues, mostly caused by technical problems with the tilting system and the couplers. The coupling problems grew particularly important with the expansion of the Pendolino network in 2006, requiring rapid on-the-fly coupling of two trains at intersection stations. Because the units often could not be coupled the train units had to be run as two separate trains running one after another. This consumed one extra train slot on the heavily used rail sections causing cascading timetable delays. Sometimes two trains would not separate after coupling them, caused by moisture in the couplers. Due to the problems VR ended the practice of coupling Pendolino trains on-the-fly at the two intersection stations; in Tampere in late 2007 and in Kouvola during autumn 2008.

VR has given mixed statements about the fault-sensitivity of the train. Pentti Kuokkanen, project coordinator of VR Engineering downplayed the problems when questioned about the reliability of another Fiat Ferroviaria multiple unit, the Sm4, in 1999. According to him, the Pendolino had been VR's most reliable passenger train during winter 1998–1999. In 2006, VR's CEO Henri Kuitunen affirmed that the Pendolino was causing serious image problems to VR Group. In 2010, the company's head of traffic control Mauno Haapala stated that the Sm3 was not more fault-sensitive than their other trains. However during winter 2011, VR Group's head of service and production department Pertti Saarela gave a totally different answer, saying that Pendolinos are more prone to failures especially during winter. It is impossible to know if the train has more problems than VR's other rolling stock, as the company does not give out punctuality statistics for specific train types.

In the 2010s, the novelty of the Pendolino has worn off and VR has even used the train in regional traffic between Oulu and Rovaniemi due to rail works in summer 2011. The problematic tilting mechanism was not used during winter 2010–2011 and the time benefit of the tilting was not taken into account in timetables of winter 2011–2012.

On 19 August 2011, VR announced it would start a refurbishment of all its Sm3 units to improve the operating conditions during winter. The work will be done between 2012 and 2014 and will cost 10 million Euros. Alstom will cover half of the expenses. The problematic couplers will be changed to allow trains to be coupled on-the-fly again at intermediate stations. Heaters will be installed in the trains' undercarriages to prevent the formation of ice during the winter. In addition to these modifications, the tilt angle of the bogies will be lowered from the current eight degrees. The operating speed of the train will remain the same. As of January 2013, new couplers have been installed in at least Sm3 units 7x12 and 7x18.

VR has been experiencing high maintenance costs and a low availability of the tilting system in its daily operations with the original Italian-designed tilting hydraulics. The original solution is based on analog hydraulics with many servo valves, which the extreme temperature differences and contamination of hydraulic oil have made very failure-prone. VR contracted Finnish scientists of Tampere University of Technology to demonstrate the feasibility of a conversion of the tilting technology using digital hydraulic technology developed at the university. Digital hydraulics replace conventional continuously adjustable servo valves with a number of smaller intelligently controlled on/off valves. The result of the study was a retrofit kit for the conversion of all Pendolinos with a plug-and-play solution that fits seamlessly into the mechanical, hydraulic and electrical interfaces of present VR Pendolinos. The kit is provided by Rexroth. Two carriages were fitted with the new system in 2012. During two years of tests in Pendolino trains in normal use there was no single failure of the system. VR has decided to retrofit the entire Pendolino fleet with digital hydraulics.

Pendolino traffic on the coastal line ended in December 2012. The two remaining services were replaced with InterCity trains, which run at similar speeds.

== Technical information ==
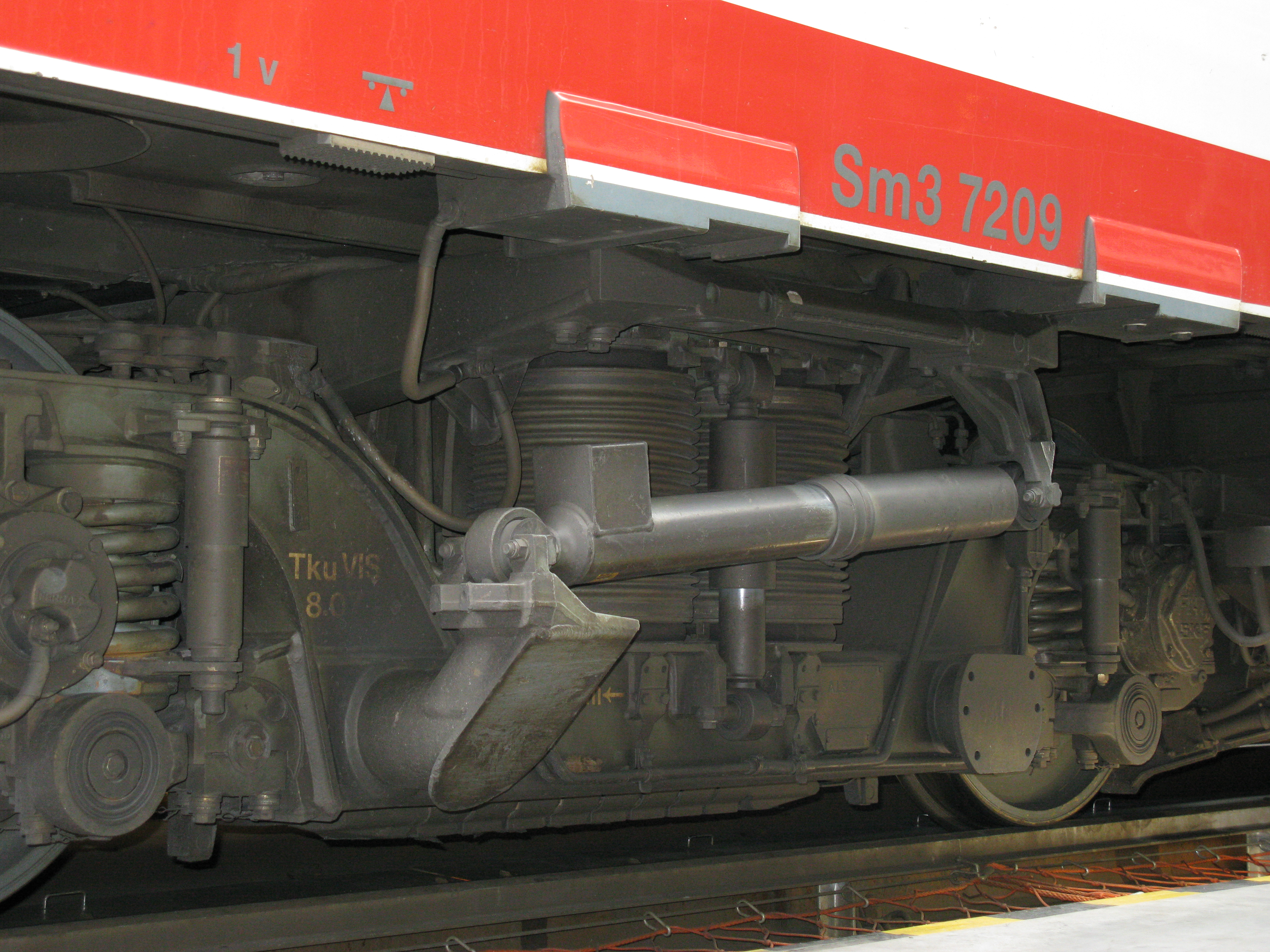
A bogie and tilting mechanism of the Sm3.

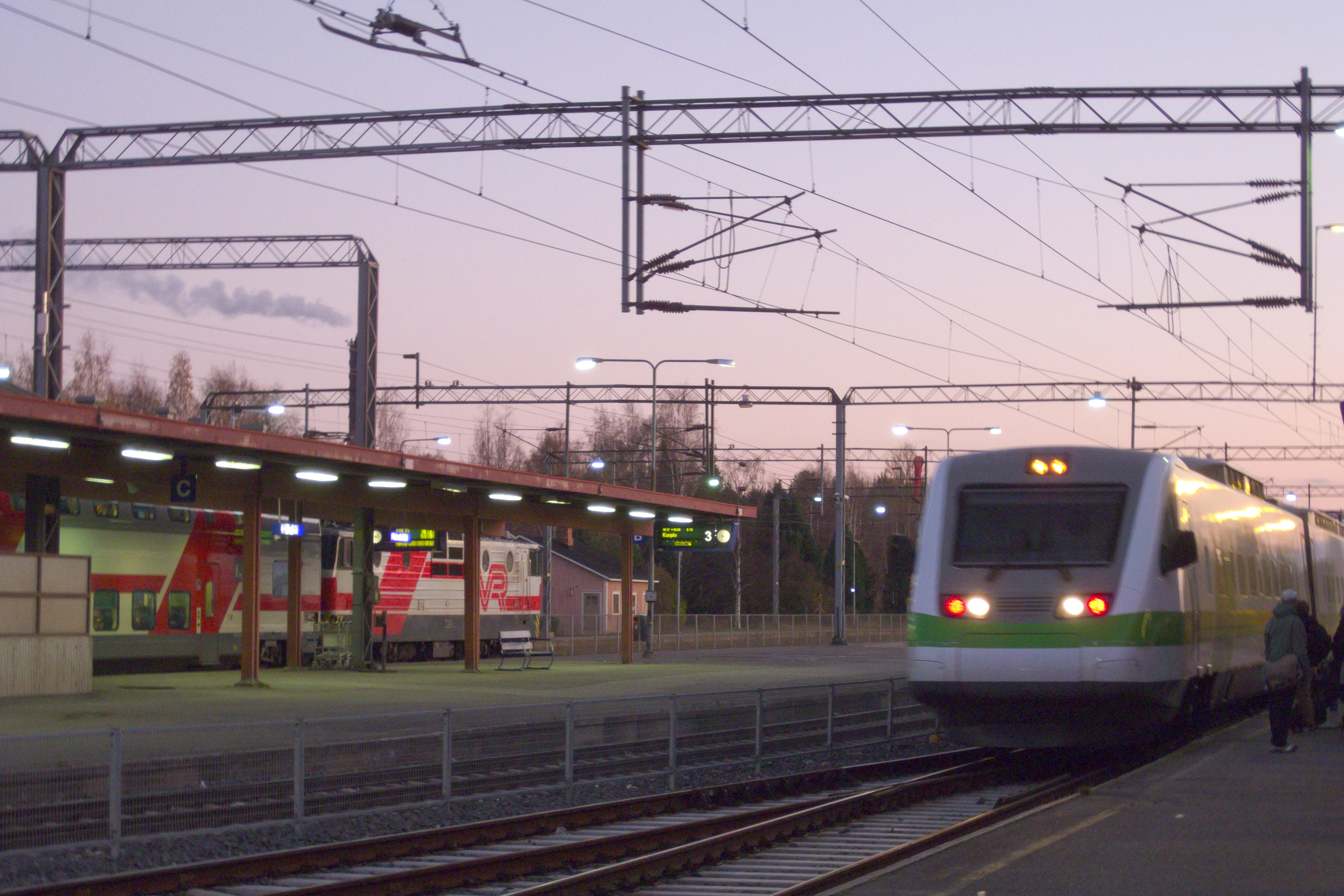
Sm3 7x02 arrives at Pieksämäki with both front and tail lights on. This happens from time to time on the prototype trains due to differences with the lighting system.

With its eight asynchronous three-phase AC motors delivering 4,000 kW (5,400 hp) to move its weight of 328 tonnes (323 long tons; 362 short tons), the Sm3 does not accelerate particularly fast, reaching 200 km/h (120 mph) from a standstill only after 3 minutes and 13 seconds and a distance of 6.8 km (4.2 mi). The tilting mechanism lets the body tilt up to 8° at speeds of over 70 km/h (43 mph), which helps to lessen the G-forces in the corners and allows the train to achieve its maximum speed of 220 kilometres per hour (140 mph). According to VR, the tilting system enables a 30 to 40% higher speed compared to traditional trains. The highest speed ever reached by the class has been 242 km/h (150 mph) during testing.

Each train consists of six cars, from front to back: IM, CM, TTC, TT, CM and IM. The IM class carriages at each end of the train are powered and fitted with a driver's compartment. The CM class is a powered passenger car. Class TTC is unpowered, it is equipped with a pantograph and a restaurant. The TT class is an unpowered passenger car which has also a pantograph on its roof. Each of the powered carriages is fitted with one motor on each of the two bogies. If needed, two trains can be coupled together.

The prototype and series trains have various differences. The number of seats was increased from 264 to 309 by changing the seat configuration in second class from 2+1 to 2+2. The information screens on the outside of the carriages were moved from the center of the carriages to next to the doors. There are also differences with the light switch logic, which often leads to the trains running with both front and tail lights on at the same end. The prototypes differed also originally by their restaurant car and Extra class features. They were modified in the mid-2000s to be similar to the series trains.

The doors of the two prototype trains were changed in 1999 as they were not working properly.

VR does the maintenance work of the trains itself, getting expert advice from Alstom as needed. The work is done in Helsinki and Turku.

== Services ==
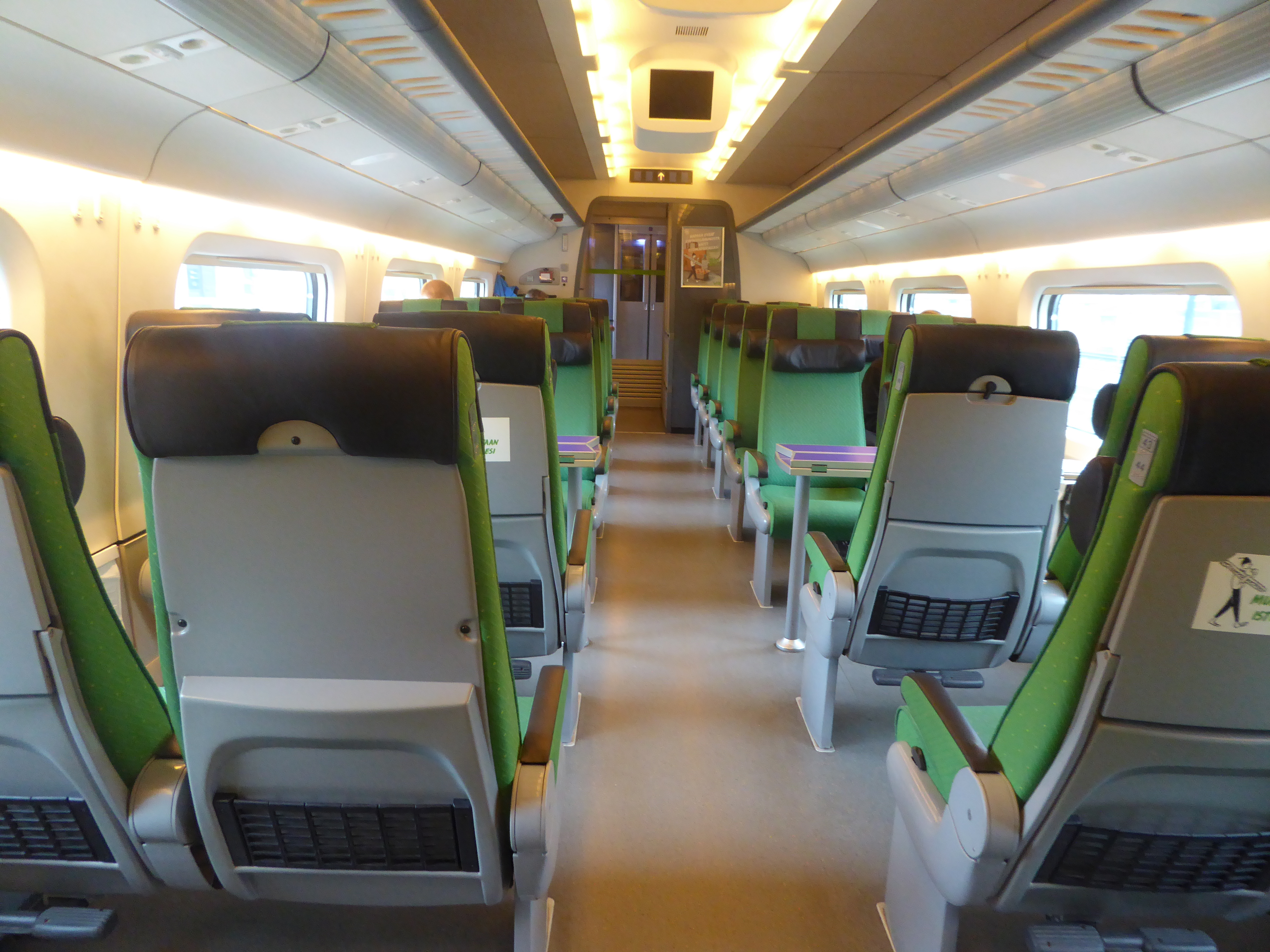
Interior of a VR pendolino in 2019

The Pendolino is designed as a premium facility train. The seats are fitted with audio sockets for radio and music channels; however the radio service was dropped in 2010 due to low usage. All seats have electricity sockets for laptops and mobile phones. All Sm3 trains offer a free onboard Wi-Fi Internet access since 2010. The passenger information monitors over the aisle in the carriages show a clock and the train's current speed in addition to VR's marketing material and station information. They are also used to convey passenger information for the deaf. The train is accessible for wheelchairs, contains pet spaces and seats for allergic passengers.

The train has an onboard bistro, named RavintoLAvaunu. It has a Nordic theme and serves traditional Finnish foods and snacks. First class passengers have access to a self-service counter with coffee, tea and the day's newspapers. Each train has also a closed-off conference compartment for business groups.

== Routes ==
The Finnish rail network, with Pendolino routes marked in green (showing also the Helsinki–Saint Petersburg route that was used by the Allegro).

The trains are distinguished in Finnish railway timetables by the letter S. The Pendolino network radiates out from the capital Helsinki. Five main routes serve most of Finland's big cities:

Regular service

- Helsinki–Rovaniemi
- Helsinki–Vaasa
- Helsinki–Jyväskylä–Pieksämäki
- Helsinki–Kouvola–Kuopio–Kajaani–Oulu
- Helsinki–Joensuu
- Helsinki–Turku

The newest service between Helsinki and Vaasa started on 12 December 2011, with the completion of the electrification work on the Seinäjoki–Vaasa line.

The trains can run at speeds up to 200 km/h (120 mph) on routes between Helsinki and Seinäjoki, Helsinki and Turku and Lahti and Luumäki as lines are being upgraded. Only the line between Kerava and Lahti permits operation at the maximum speed of 220 kilometres per hour (140 mph).

== Livery ==
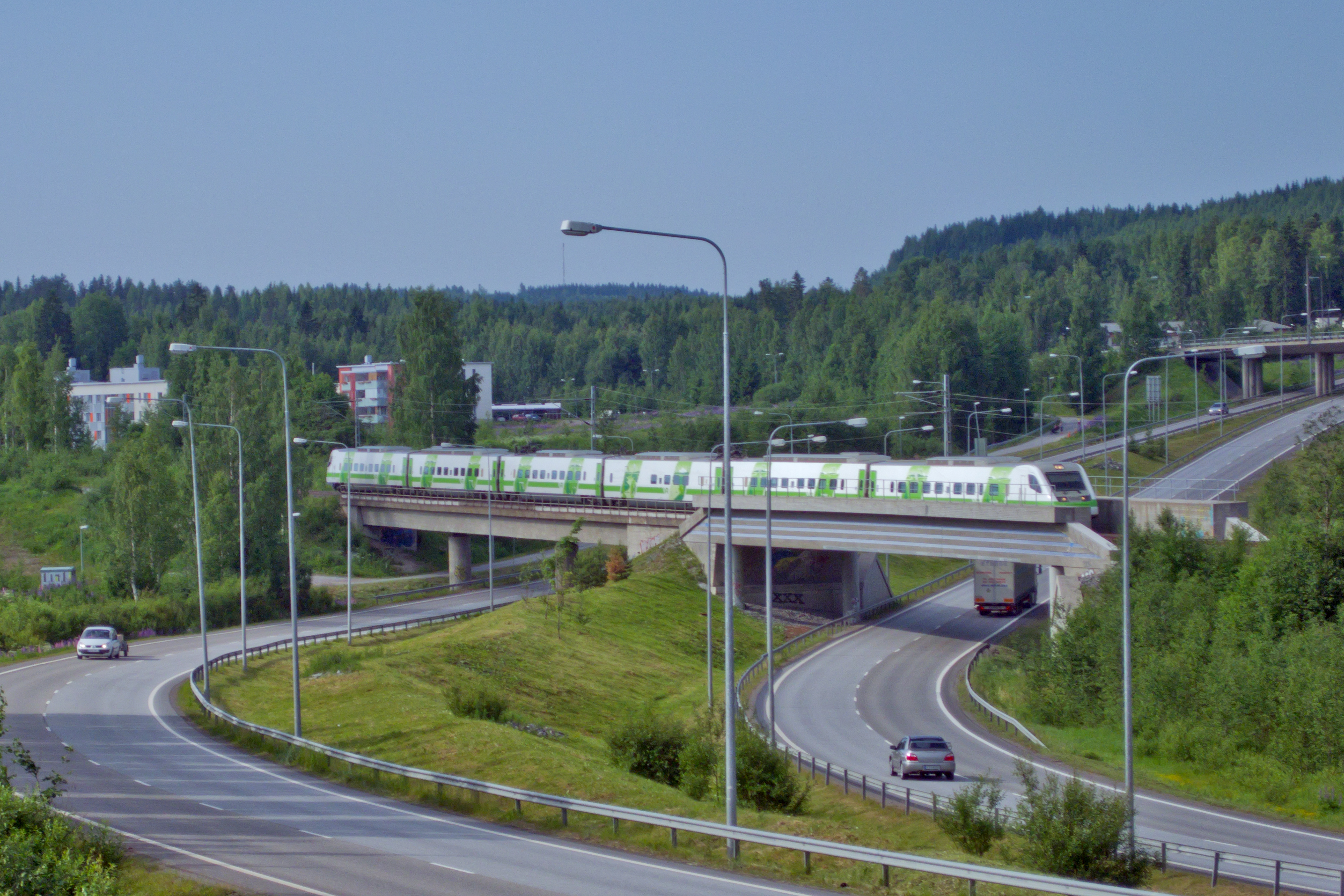
The oldest Finnish Pendolino (unit 7x01) at Jyväskylä in its green livery in 2011.

At least two livery variants were tested on scale models, which were later exposed at VR's conference centre at Helsinki central railway station: one has a red strip for the whole length of the train, with the window backgrounds painted grey. The other is more similar to the final result, but the front of the train includes more red and no grey paint at all. VR finally settled to a combination of both of them, which bore resemblance to the company's InterCity livery. The bottom of the carriages is dark grey, with a red stripe distinguishing it from the white base colour. The top of the carriages is painted grey. Red colouring at the end of each car forms red parallelograms when the carriages are combined. When asked why the trains were not blue and white, VR's CEO answered that red and white fits the train and its design the best.

The trains were originally marked with only a V instead of the full VR logo to symbolise the company's high speed transport. The same logo was also used on the Sr2 locomotive. The text "Pendolino S220" was written on the units according to the train's original branding. On later units, VR's logo was fully painted (the same happened with the Sr2) and "S220" dropped.

Since 2009, VR has been repainting its fleet in new colours according to its changed visual identity. Green colour has replaced red, and each car now has two green parallelograms instead of one larger figure between carriages. Artwork showcasing Finnish nature decorates them. As of December 2012, Sm3 units 7x01 to 7x04, 7x06 to 7x10 and 7x12 have been repainted in the new livery.

== Incidents and accidents ==
On 9 January 2003 an improperly locked door came loose in a high-speed tunnel at Perniö. No-one was injured in the accident. The settings of all Sm3 doors were checked by the operator in the following days.

A Sm3 derailed near Karjaa on 25 July 2003 due to a defect in a turnout. The train derailed at a low speed after mechanics turned the turnout blades manually into the correct position, but forgot to check the turnout frog, which was set to a diverging track. The first three carriages of the train derailed completely, in addition to the first bogie of the fourth car.

In December 2021 two Sm3 units crashed on low speed near Tampere station. No one was hurt, but both of the trains were severely damaged.

== Sm6 Allegro ==
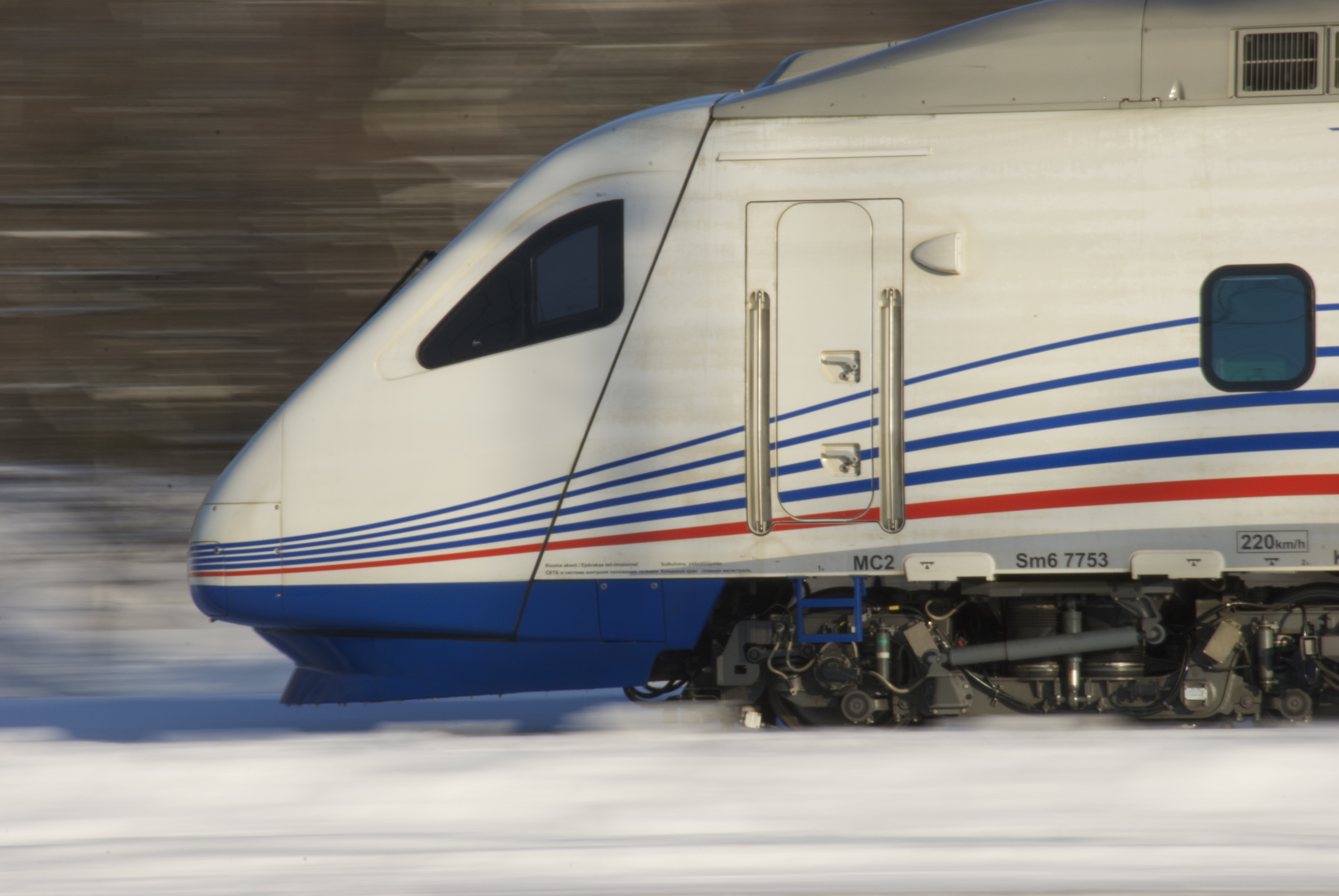
An Allegro train leaves Helsinki.

In December 2010, Karelian Trains, a joint venture by VR and RZhD, started a new service linking Helsinki and St. Petersburg, Russia using a new model of the Pendolino called the Sm6 Allegro. The Sm6 is technically based on the New Pendolino, but its looks are similar to the Sm3. The most significant difference is that an Sm6 unit is composed of seven carriages. The train is capable of dual-voltage running due to differences between the electric systems of the Finnish and Russian rail network and is equipped with four pantographs.

The Sm6 Allegro was reserved for international passengers and therefore couldn't be used for travel inside of Finland. There were four trains per day in each direction.

The service was suspended on 27 March 2022 due to the international sanctions, and in its half-year report, VR Group announced that it wrote off all Allegro rolling stock and spare parts. Later, VR refurbished the trains for domestic traffic as Sm6 Pendolino Plus.

== See also ==
- List of high speed trains
- High-speed rail in Europe
- Sm6 Pendolino Plus
