= Karelian Trains =

Finnish-Russian railway joint venture

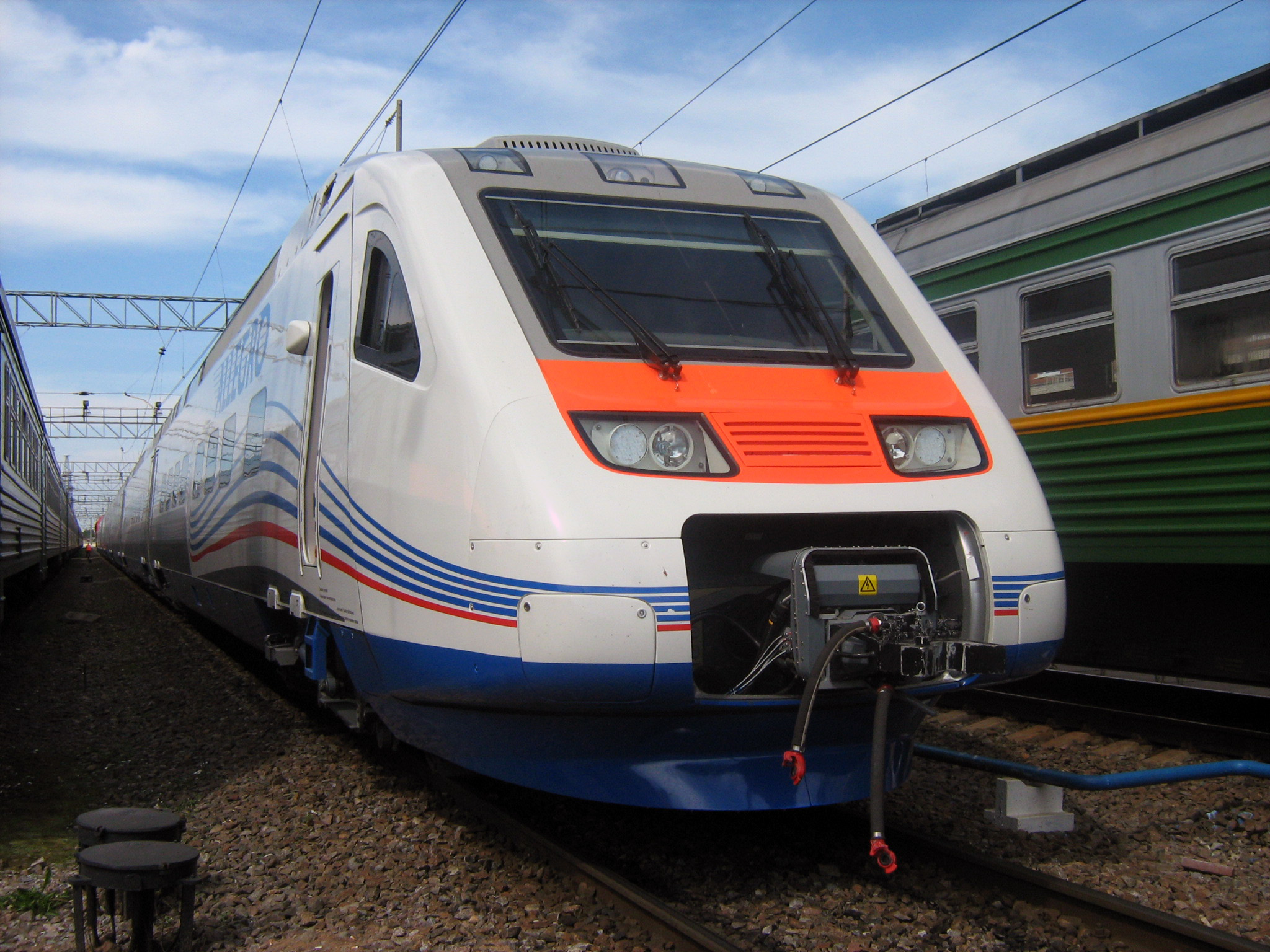
Allegro in Russia

Oy Karelian Trains Ltd was a joint venture agreed on 23 November 2006 between Russian Railways (RZhD) and VR Group (Finnish Railways) to facilitate the operation of international express passenger rail services between Helsinki, Finland, and Saint Petersburg, Russia. Karelian Trains was registered in Helsinki; VR and RZhD both owned 50% of the shares. The services are branded as Allegro.

== Operations ==
Services were launched on 12 December 2010 using Alstom Pendolino trains ordered in September 2007. Investments will also be made in infrastructure to enable higher speeds to be achieved. Together, this has cut journey times between the two cities from the previous 5 1/2 hours to 3 hours and 27 minutes. There are four daily train departures each direction, compared to two for the older service. The daily locomotive-hauled night train Helsinki–Moscow (branded as Tolstoi) will continue as before.

Travel visas are required for many foreign nationals, including Finns, to enter Russia and for Russians to enter Finland. Passport and customs checks are conducted on board the trains. Traditionally, the passport and customs checks have delayed the trains by at least 30 minutes according to the timetable (1 hour for 30 km Vyborg-the border).

During the first year of operation, the service carried 280,000 passengers, far more than expected. The trips made by Finns to Russia were mainly business trips, while Russians came to Finland largely on leisure trips.

All rail connections with Russia ceased in March 2022 following the Russian invasion of Ukraine. The four trains are now redundant and Finland would like to donate them to Ukraine however they are jointly owned with Russian Railways - RZhD.

In December 2023, it was announced that VR Group had assumed the financial obligations of the Karelian Trains company since the latter could no longer meet them itself. VR Group plans to reuse the Sm6 rolling stock in domestic operations.

== Rolling stock ==
The service between Helsinki and St. Petersburg was provided using four Alstom-built Pendolino trains similar in interior fitting and exterior appearance to the VR Class Sm3 Pendolino trains that have been operated by the VR since 1995. The new trains, branded Allegro, are dual voltage, capable of operating on VR's 25 kV AC and RZhD's 3 kV DC electrification systems. The Allegro trains are painted in a new livery inspired by the colours of the flags of Finland and Russia, with blue and red stripes on a white and silver background, and a blue undercarriage. In 2025, VR began using the trains on domestic services within Finland.

== See also ==
- Finland station
- Helsinki Central railway station
