= VR Class Sm6 =

Class of Finnish high-speed electric multiple units

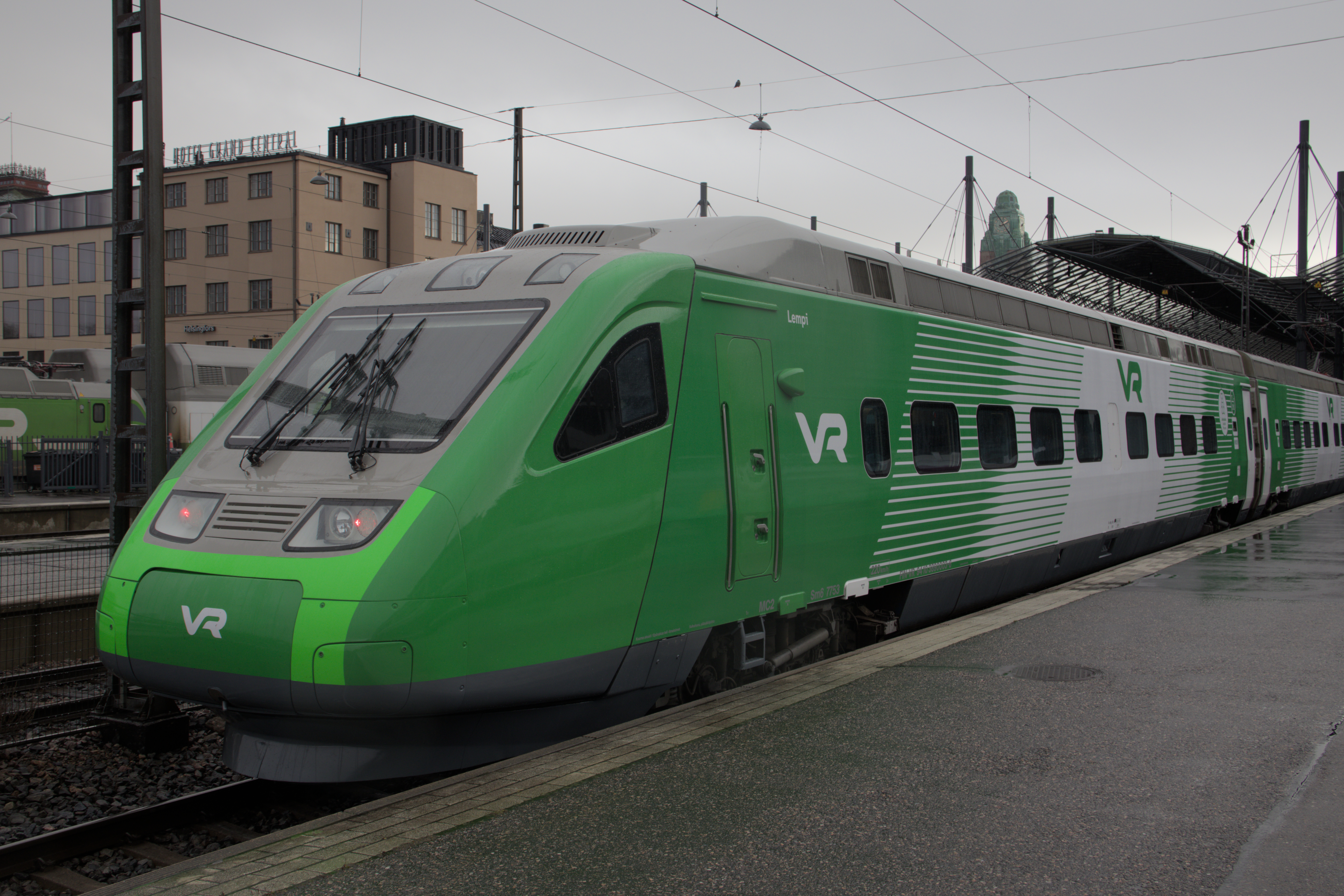
- A Sm6 unit at Helsinki Central before operating the first Pendolino Plus train service

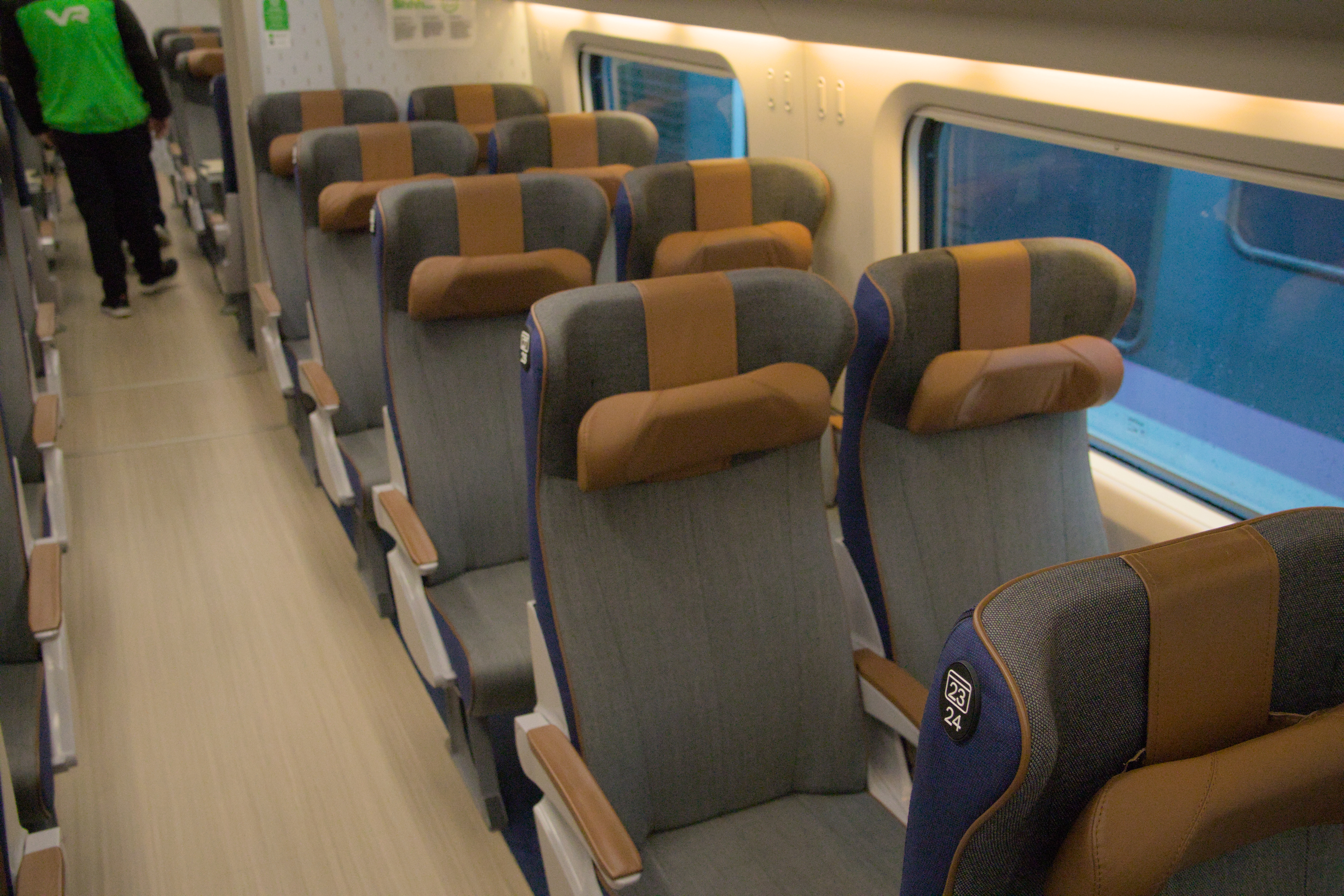
- Second class coach
- Stock type: Electric multiple unit
- In service: 2010–2022; 2025–
- Manufacturer: Alstom
- Built at: Savigliano
- Family name: New Pendolino
- Constructed: 2009–2011
- Entered service: 2010
- Refurbished: 2018–2019, 2025
- Number built: 4
- Formation: 7 cars
- Capacity: 337 + 2 disabled access; + 38 in restaurant
- Operator: VR Group; Russian Railways (former)

Specifications
- Train length: 184.80 m (606 ft 4 in)
- Car length: 25.00 m (82 ft 0 in); 27.20 m (89 ft 3 in)
- Width: 3,200 mm (10 ft 6 in)
- Height: 4,270 mm (14 ft 0 in)
- Floor height: 1,270 mm (4 ft 2 in)
- Platform height: 200 mm (7.9 in) (Russia AC and Northern Finland); 550 mm (21.7 in) (Southern Finland); 1,100 mm (43.3 in) (Russia DC)
- Doors: 12+12
- Maximum speed: 220 km/h (140 mph)
- Power output: 5,500 kW (7,400 hp)
- Electric systems: 25 kV 50 Hz AC; 3 kV DC catenary
- Current collection: Pantograph
- Safety systems: Finland: ATP-VR/RHK; Russia: KLUB-U
- Track gauge: Russian track: 1,520 mm (4 ft 11 27/32 in) Russian gauge Finnish track: 1,524 mm (5 ft); Wheelsets: 1,522 mm (59.92 in)

The Sm6 is a class of high-speed electric multiple unit trainsets built by Alstom. Four sets were originally built for the now-defunct Allegro train service operated by Karelian Trains, a joint venture between RZD (Russian Railways) and VR (Finnish Railways). VR seized the trains from the joint venture in 2023 and began using them in domestic services in November 2025 under the brand name Pendolino Plus.

The Sm6 appears externally similar to VR's earlier Sm3 Pendolino series, but is based on the fourth generation 'Pendolino Nuovo' or 'New Pendolino' designs and its construction differed from the Sm3 in many ways. Each trainset consists of seven carriages. The top speed of the train in passenger traffic is 220 km/h (140 mph). Although the units were built with tilt capability and used it during their service with Karelian Trains, new owners VR have disabled the system to save maintenance costs and to allow their other rolling stock to keep to Sm6 timings in the event of a substitution.

All four Sm6 trains were refurbished by VR FleetCare between 2018 and 2019. The Sm6 fleet is maintained at Ilmala depot in Helsinki, although some maintenance, mainly related to Russian technical systems, was performed in Saint Petersburg. Since their introduction on domestic services, the units also visit Oulu's Nokela depot for stabling and wheel reprofiling.

The Sm6 was equipped to operate on both the Finnish and the Russian railway networks. The units had dual-voltage electrical equipment able to use both the Finnish 25 kV 50 Hz alternating current and the Russian 3 kV direct current electrification systems. The wheelsets were built to run at over 200 km/h (120 mph) speeds on both the Finnish 1,524 mm (5 ft) and the nominally slightly narrower Russian 1,520 mm (4 ft 11 27/32 in) gauges, and the doors were equipped with a retractable step to make boarding from both Finnish 550 mm (21.7 in) high and Russian 1,100 mm (43.3 in) high platforms easy. The units were equipped for both the Finnish and Russian railway technical systems, which differed substantially.

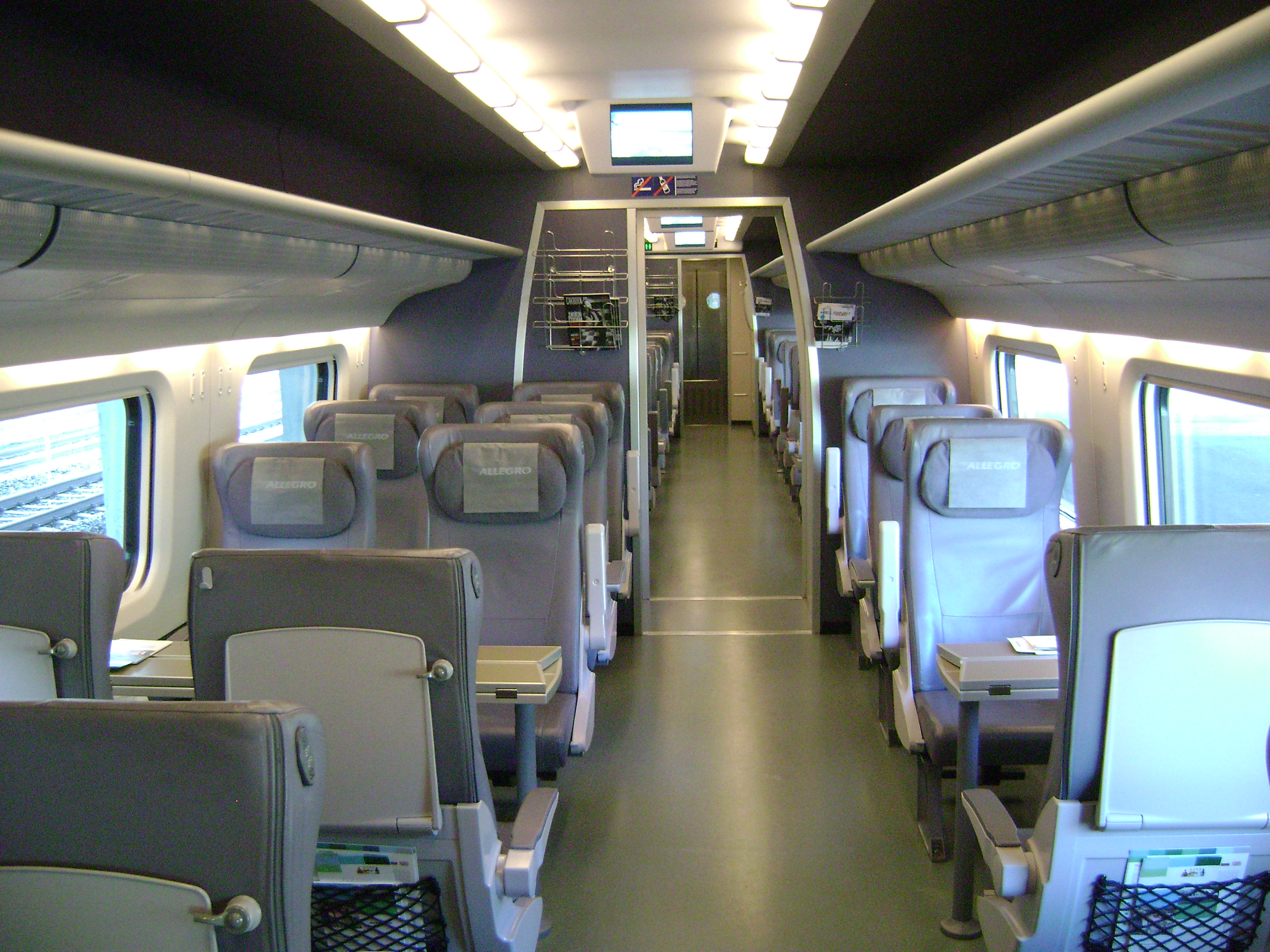
First class coach (before refurbishment)

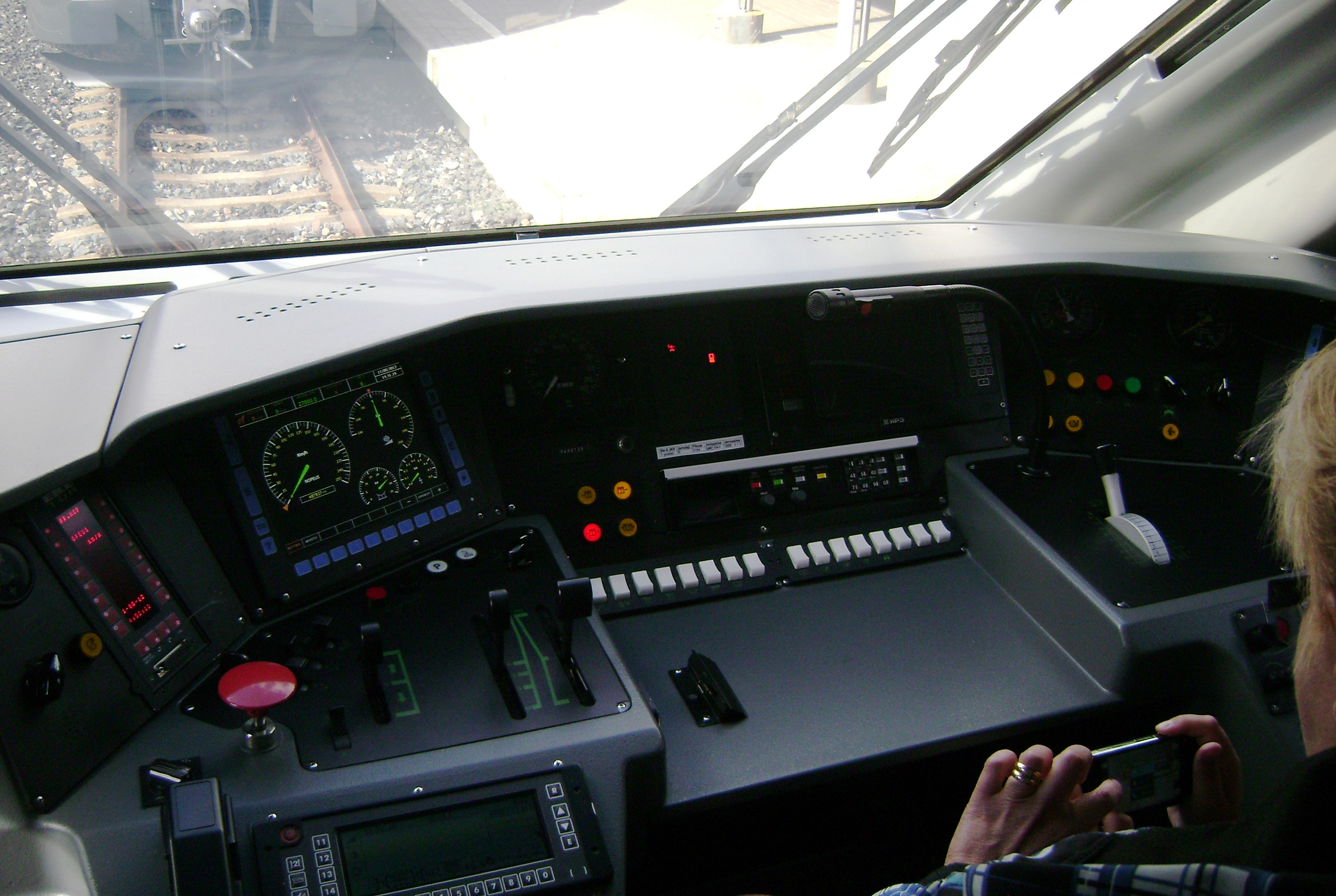
Driver's cabin
