= VR Class Sm7 =

Class of Finnish electric multiple unit trains

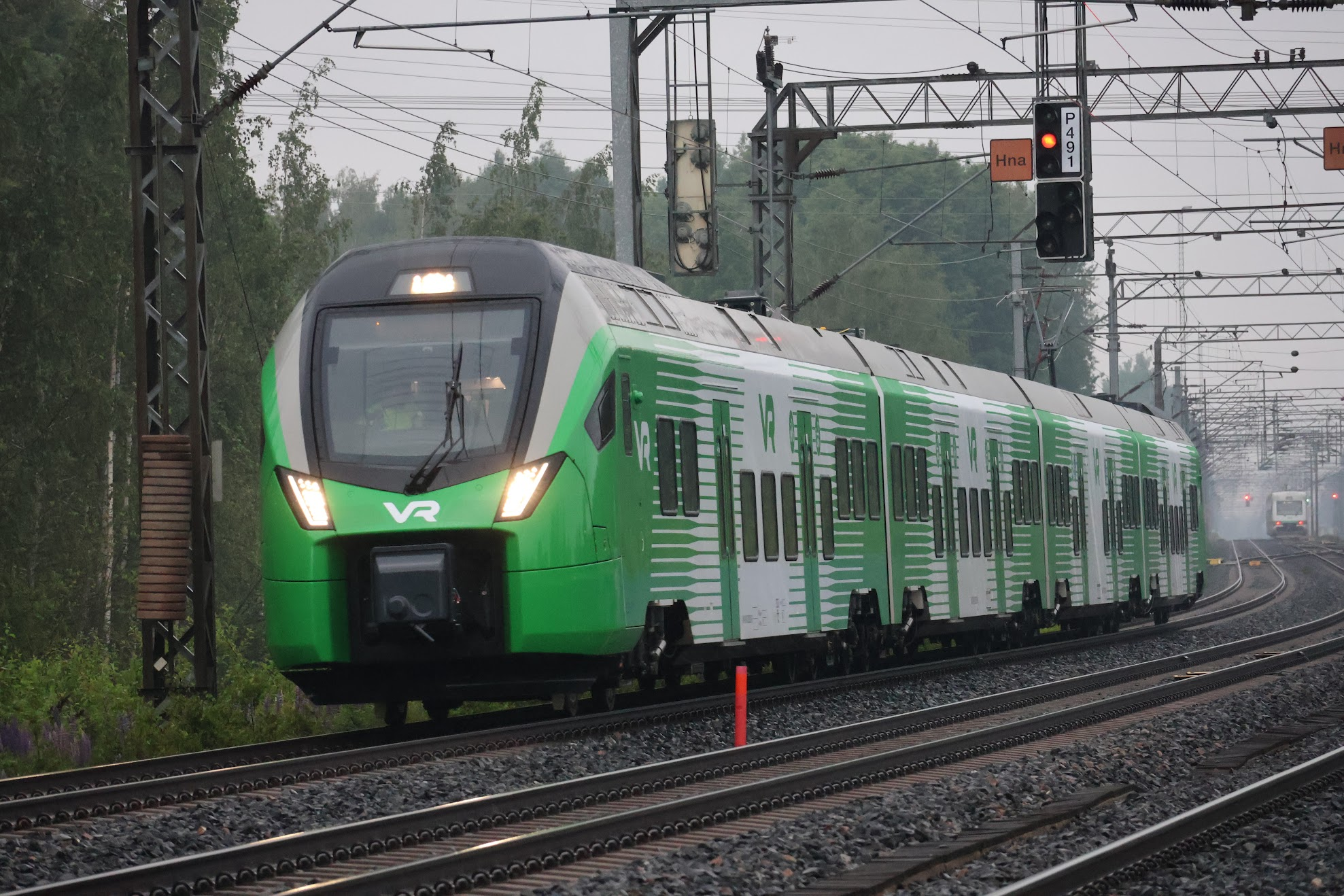
- A Sm7 unit returning to Ilmala yard after a test run on June 17, 2025.

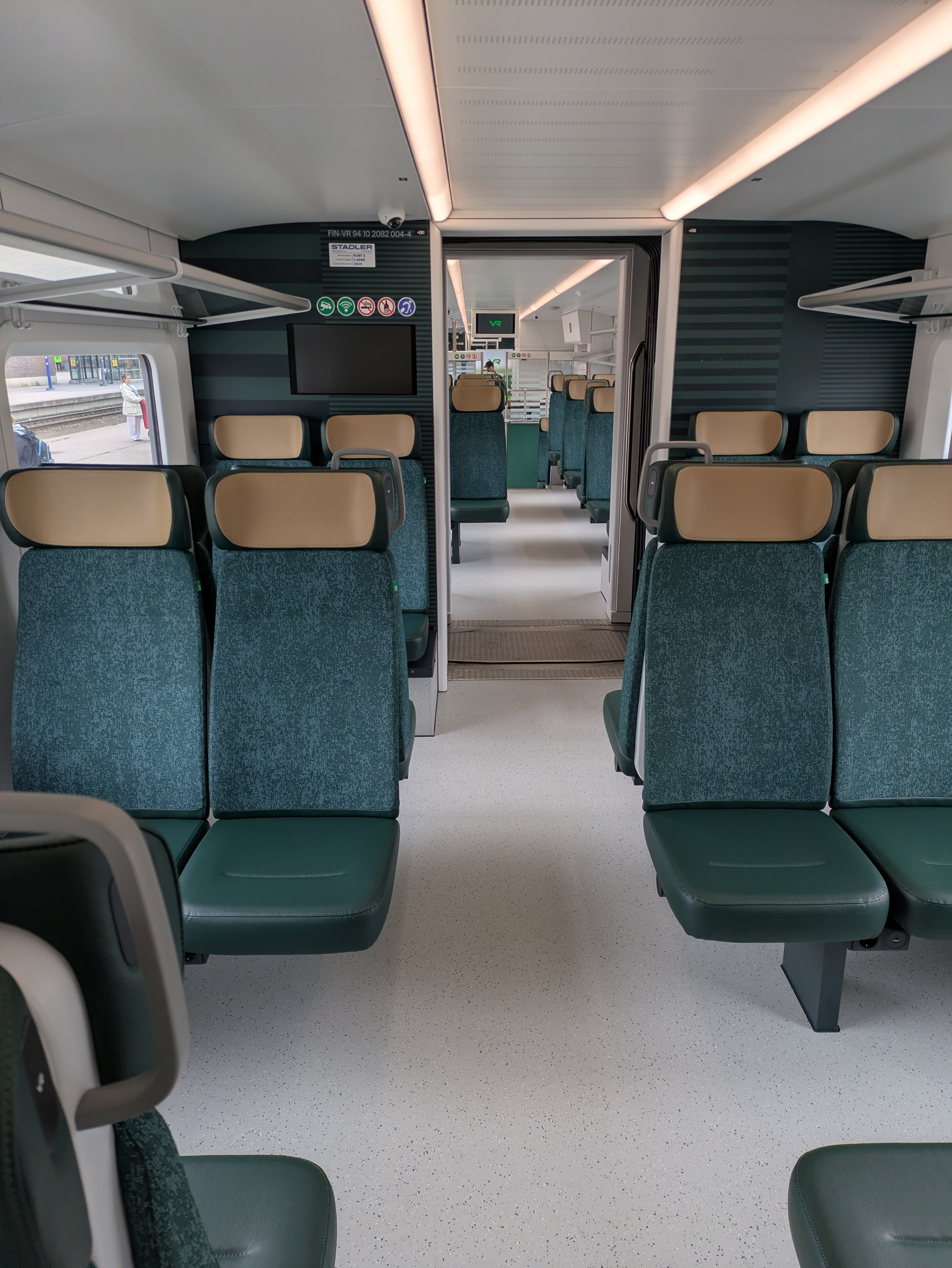
- Interior of Sm7 unit
- Stock type: Electric multiple unit
- In service: 2026– (planned)
- Manufacturer: Stadler
- Built at: Siedlce
- Family name: FLIRT
- Constructed: 2025–
- Number built: 20 ordered (with option for 50 more)
- Predecessor: Sm2; Sm4
- Formation: 4 cars
- Capacity: 796 passengers (356 seats)
- Owner: Railstock Finland
- Operator: VR
- Depot: Ilmala

Specifications
- Doors: 4 per carriage; 16 per trainset
- Maximum speed: 160 km/h (100 mph)
- HVAC: Yes
- Seating: Transverse
- Track gauge: 1,524 mm (5 ft)

The Sm7 is a class of 4-carriage electric multiple unit trains planned to enter service on the VR commuter rail network starting in 2026. The trains are based on the Stadler FLIRT platform (same as the urban Sm5 trains) and are assembled in Poland. They will replace the Sm4 trains on the D, R, T, Z and M routes which will in turn allow the non-accessible Sm2 trains to be retired entirely.

The first Sm7 train was delivered to Port of Hanko, Finland in May 2025. Four additional units were delivered before the units entered in commercial service, and the full initial order is due to be in service in early 2028.

The sets are owned by Railstock Finland, a government-owned rolling stock leasing company, and are leased to VR Group at least until 2030.

Side and end view of the Stadler FLIRT3 trains delivered to VR Group Oyj as Class Sm7 in their delivered livery.

== Interior ==
The Sm7 will have a modifiable interior, where if needed more bicycle spots can be added during summer and the trains have tables with the chairs, so using a computer is easier. The trains also have free Wi-Fi for all passengers and charging sockets for all seats.
