= VR Class Dm12 =

Class of Finnish diesel multiple unit

Dm12
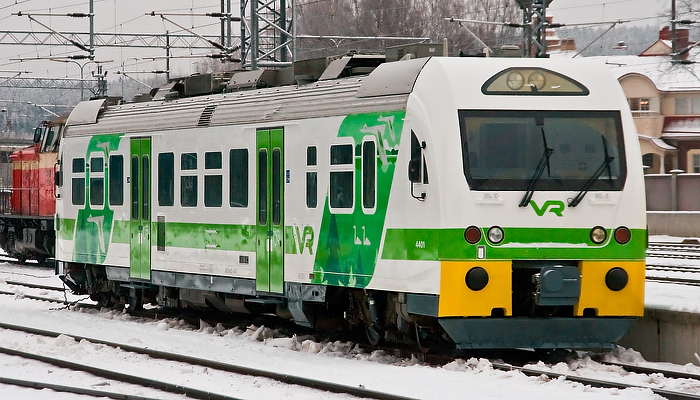
- Dm12 unit 4401 at Jyväskylä railway station

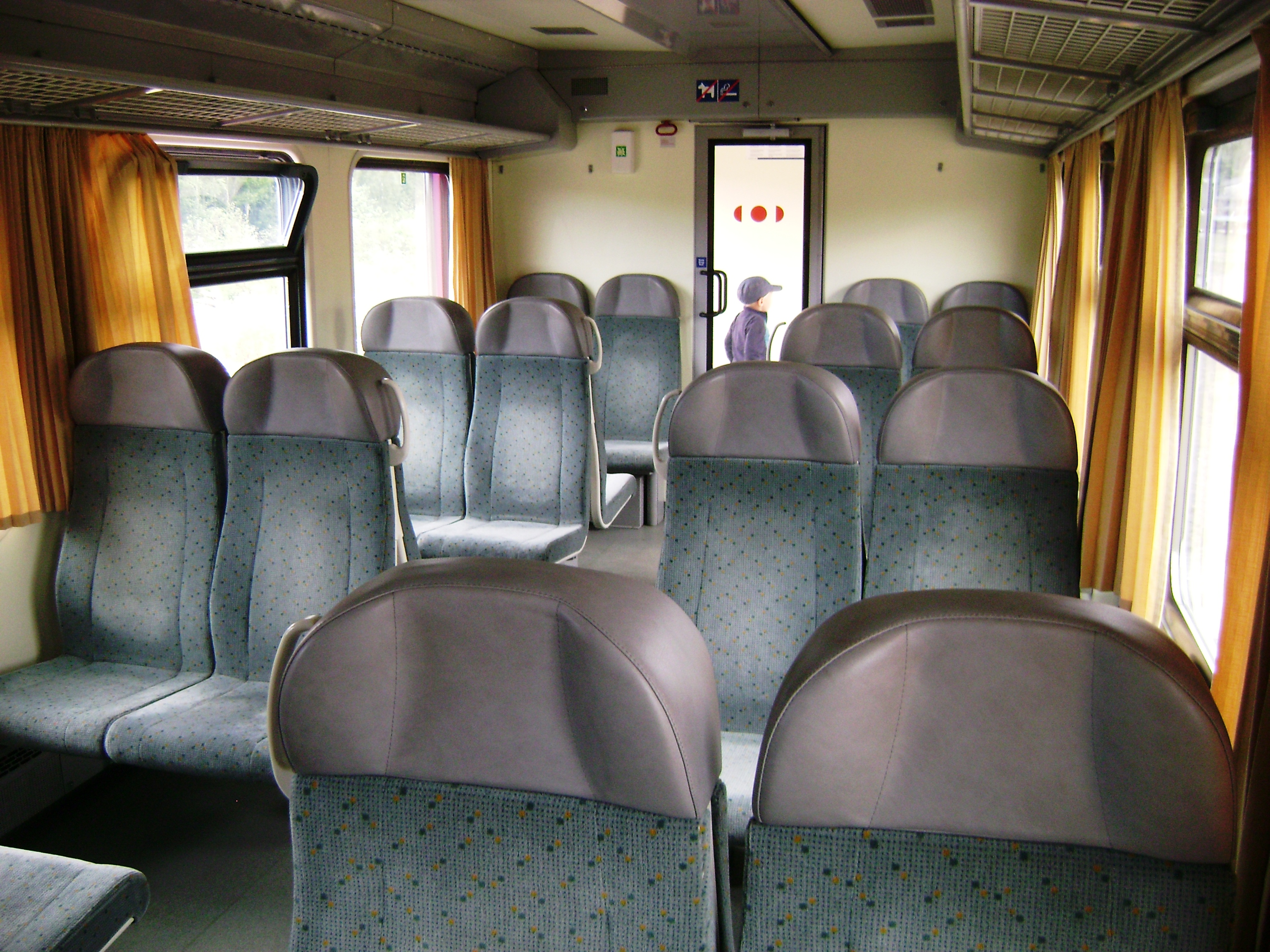
- In service: 2005–
- Manufacturers: ČKD Vagonka (later Škoda Vagonka, a subsidiary of Škoda Transportation)
- Constructed: 2004–2006
- Entered service: 2005
- Number built: 16
- Number in service: 16
- Formation: 1 car
- Fleet numbers: 4401–4416
- Capacity: 63
- Owner: Railstock Finland
- Operator: VR Group
- Lines served: Joensuu–Nurmes; Savonlinna–Parikkala; Tampere–Keuruu–Jyväskylä; Jyväskylä–Seinäjoki

Specifications
- Car length: 25,200 mm (82 ft 8 in)
- Width: 2,850 mm (9 ft 4 in)
- Height: 4,218 mm (13 ft 10.1 in)
- Platform height: 550 mm (21.65 in)
- Doors: 2 + 2
- Maximum speed: 120 km/h (75 mph)
- Weight: 48 t (47 long tons; 53 short tons)
- Prime mover: 2 x MAN D2876 LUE 606
- Engine type: Diesel engine
- Power output: 2 x 301 kW (404 hp)
- Transmission: VOITH
- Track gauge: 1,524 mm (5 ft)

The Dm12 is a diesel railcar operated by VR Group.

== History ==
VR was searching a diesel motor car to be used on low traffic regional services on non-electrified tracks years after the last of the earlier diesel motor car series had been decommissioned by the end of the 1980s, and diesel locomotive pulled passenger trains had been found to be uneconomical for small-demand services. VR had earlier experimented with converting an old unpowered passenger car into a diesel motor car, but the prototype was never put to service and VR ultimately decided to acquire all-new cars. After a failed purchase, 16 Dm12 units with 20 options were finally ordered from the Czech manufacturer ČKD Vagonka, now Škoda Vagonka, in 2001, at a price of 160 million FIM.

The first unit arrived to Finland earlier than expected, on 18 December 2004, after being tested in the Czech republic. VR was able to start traffic using the first unit between Joensuu and Pieksämäki on 20 May 2005. After a month and a half of usage without problems, it was serviced in June 2005, including a change of seats and modifications to the air intake. The second unit was delivered in August 2005 and followed the first between Joensuu and Pieksämäki. More units soon followed, and they were used between Joensuu and Nurmes. At the end of the year, VR had received 11 units, nine of which were serving passengers.

The units were delivered to VR in 2004–2006, entering commercial service in 2005. The units are used in regional and feeder services mostly in Eastern and Central Finland, but also used to be in service on the Karis-Hanko route near the coast of the Gulf of Finland. It was replaced by the electric Sm4 unit after electrification of the Hanko-Karjaa railway. The Dm12 is currently the only diesel motor car in Finland.

All Dm12 units were withdrawn from service on 28 June 2012 after two fires in short succession, in Punkaharju on 21 June 2012, and Keuruu on 27 June 2012. The multiple units were temporarily replaced with trains pulled with diesel locomotives or buses. The fires were a result of a fuel leak, which caused fuel to spill on the hot engine. The units had re-entered service in July 2012 after the faulty fuel lines were replaced.

Ownership of the railcars was transferred to the state-owned rolling stock leasing company Railstock Finland in March 2026.

== Specifications ==
At a maximum, three Dm12 units can be coupled into a train to increase capacity (although this is rarely done). Each car has three passenger compartments, two entrance vestibules and a driver's cabin at each end of the car. The driver cabins have air conditioning. There are two places for wheelchair-using passengers, the unit has lifting platforms for wheelchair access and the toilet is designed to be accessible to the disabled. The heating of the passenger compartments uses waste heat from the diesel engines.

== Livery ==
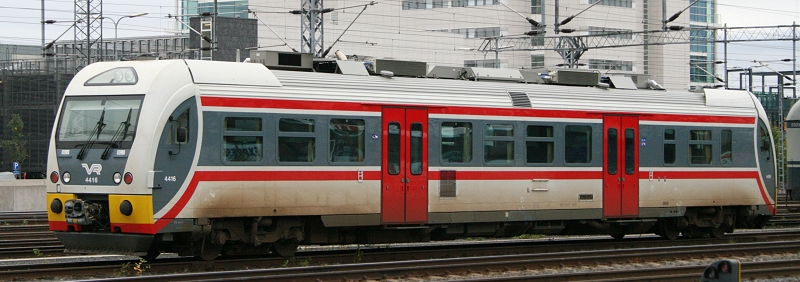
Dm12 number 4416 in the original red-gray livery at Jyväskylä in 2006.

Dm12 units were painted in a distinctive red-gray colouring on a white background. In June 2012, the two oldest units, 4401 and 4402, had been painted according to VR's white-green paint scheme. Nowadays all of them are in the white-green livery.
