= VR Class Sm4 =

Electric multiple unit

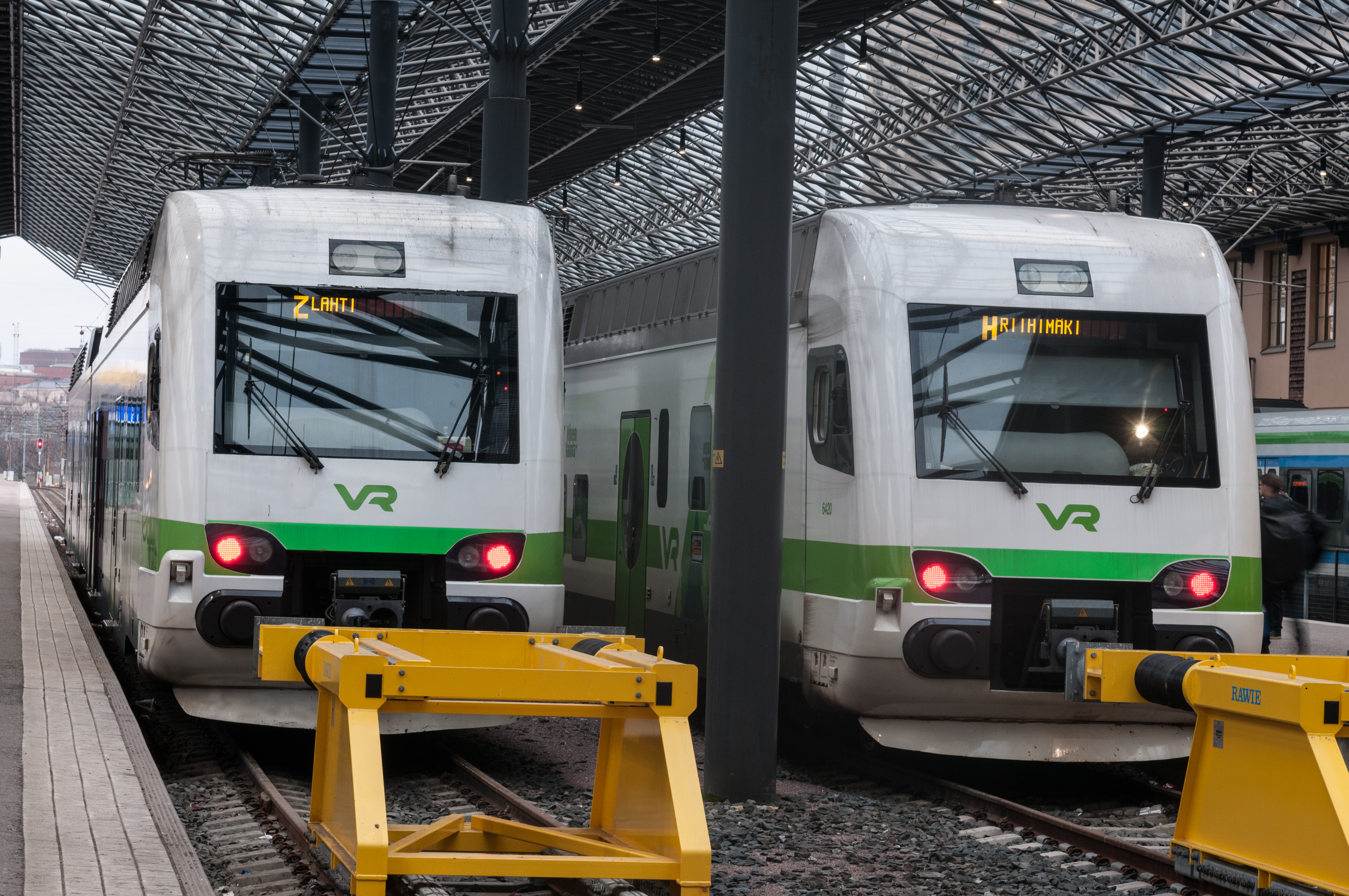
- 2 refurbished Sm4 units side by side at Helsinki Central station.

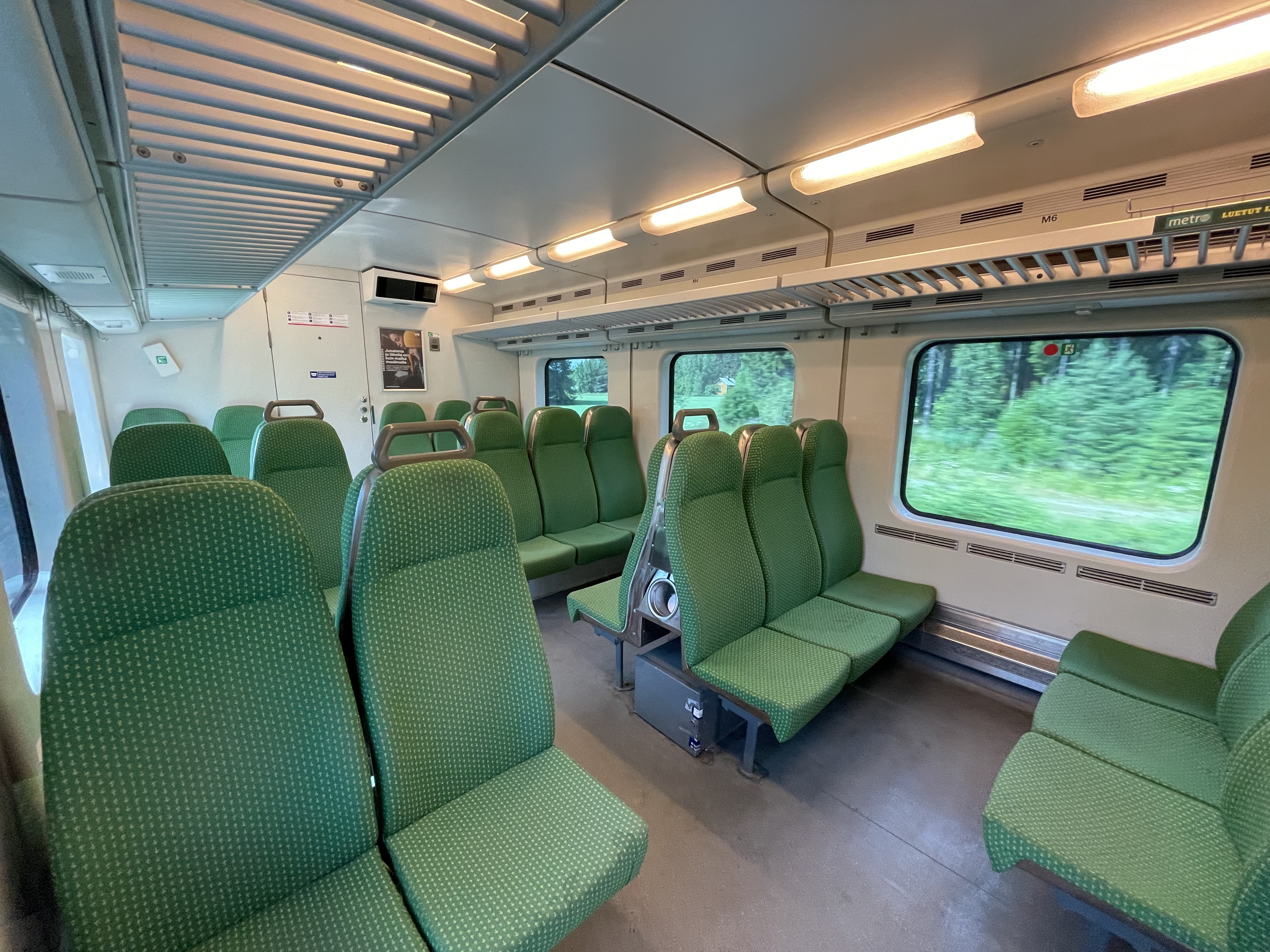
- The interior of a refurbished Sm4 unit
- Stock type: Electric Multiple Unit
- Manufacturers: CAF, Fiat Ferroviaria, Alstom
- Family name: Coradia
- Constructed: 1998–2005
- Entered service: 1999
- Refurbished: VR Hyvinkää workshop (2013–2016)
- Number built: 30
- Formation: 2 cars
- Fleet numbers: 6301+6401 – 6310+6410 (1998-1999), 6311+6411 – 6324+6424 (2004), 6325+6425 – 6330+6430 (2005)
- Capacity: 192(+8) seats + 100 standing places
- Owner: Railstock Finland
- Operator: VR Group

Specifications
- Car length: 26.45 m (86 ft 9 in)
- Width: 3.24 m (10 ft 8 in)
- Height: 4.4 m (14 ft 5 in)
- Floor height: 580 mm (22.8 in)
- Platform height: 550 mm (21.7 in)
- Doors: 4 per side
- Maximum speed: 160 km/h (100 mph)
- Weight: 114 t (112 long tons; 126 short tons)
- Traction motors: 2 × 600 kW (805 hp)
- Power output: 1,200 kW (1,609 hp)
- Electric system: 25 kV 50 Hz AC catenary
- Current collection: Pantograph
- UIC classification: B′2′+2′B′
- Safety system: ATP-VR/RHK
- Track gauge: 1,524 mm (5 ft)

The Sm4 electric multiple unit (EMU) is a low-floor train used by the VR Group for its VR commuter rail services. The initial order was for ten EMUs with the first unit entering service in 1999. Another 20 units were ordered in 2002 and the deliveries were completed in 2005. The Spanish company CAF was contracted to manufacture the units, based on a design by Fiat Ferroviaria (later acquired by Alstom). The train has the nickname of pupu, meaning ‘bunny’.

Ownership of the sets were transferred to the state-owned rolling stock leasing company Railstock Finland in 2026.

== Features ==
The Sm4 EMU consists of two powered cars, each equipped with a pantograph. The unit is capable of regenerative braking and can thereby save up to 30% of the electrical energy that would otherwise be consumed. The maximum speed is 160 km/h (99 mph). The unit offers a good level of passenger comfort with a quiet and smooth ride quality. The Sm4 passenger compartments are fitted with air conditioning, CCTV cameras and display screens that can be used to show e.g. route information. The units have partly low floors with all of the entrances at platform level, and they are equipped with toilets accessible to the disabled. There are racks for bicycles in the entrance vestibules nearest to the driver's cabins. Trains are usually formed of two units, but also only one and up to four in the peak hours, when traffic is too high to increase capacity by higher frequency of trains. This allows for a flexible handling of varying passenger traffic. The maximum number of connected units is five.

== Routes ==
The Sm4 is designed for longer-distance trips than typical metro-like local services. The Sm4 units have largely replaced the older Sm1 and Sm2 units on commuter services from Helsinki to Riihimäki and Lahti. The units are also used in commuter traffic on the Tampere–Riihimäki and Riihimäki–Kouvola routes. The Sm4s were also used for the shorter, frequently-stopping services because of the lack of more suitable low floor trains. The new Sm5 low floor trains that started to enter commercial service in November 2009 have completely replaced the Sm4 units on HSL commuter rail routes.

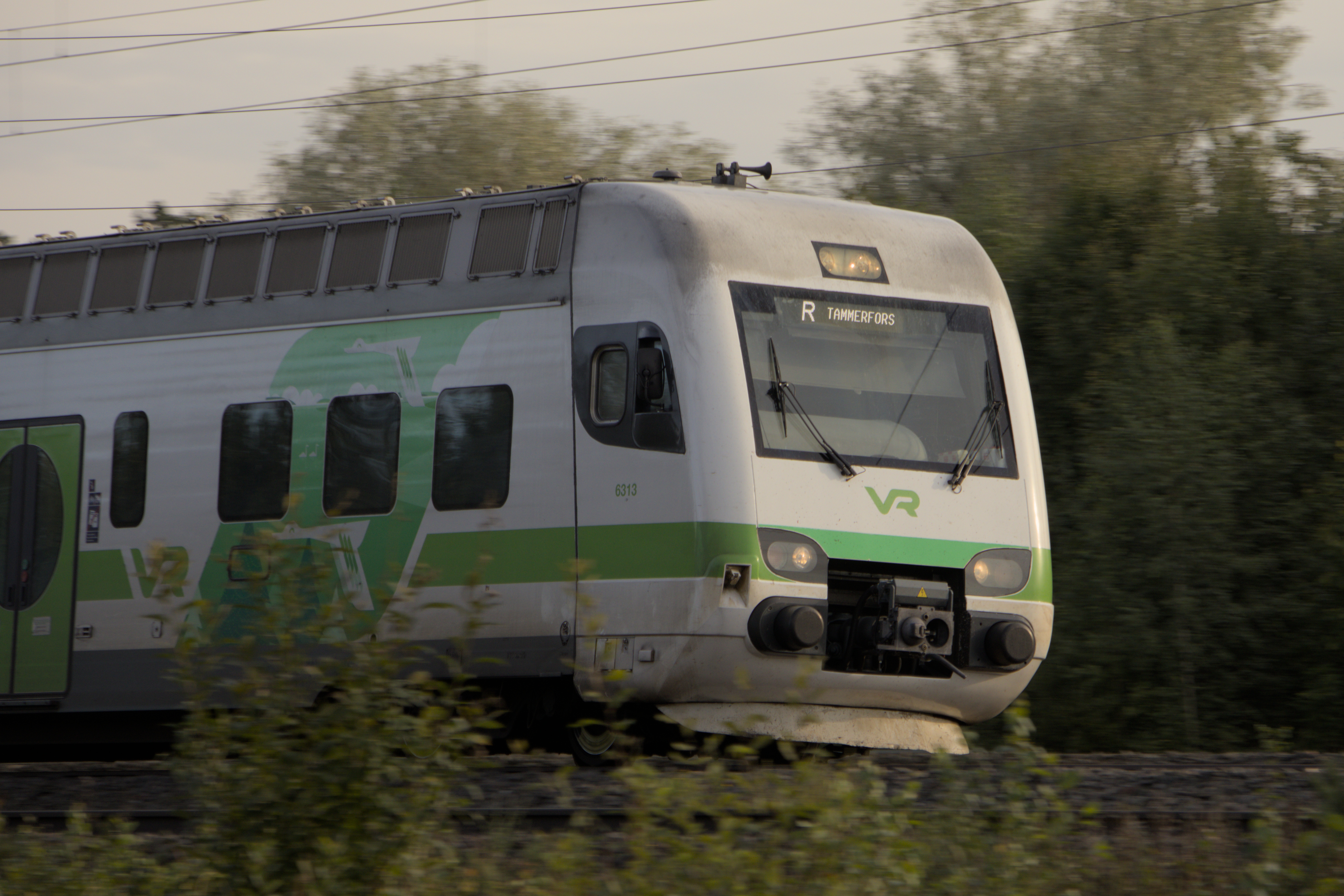
Sm4 train with a refreshed passenger information system on a main line service

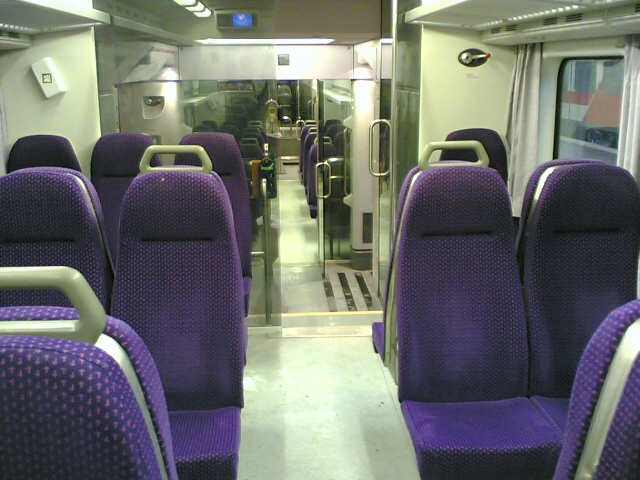
Sm4 old inside design

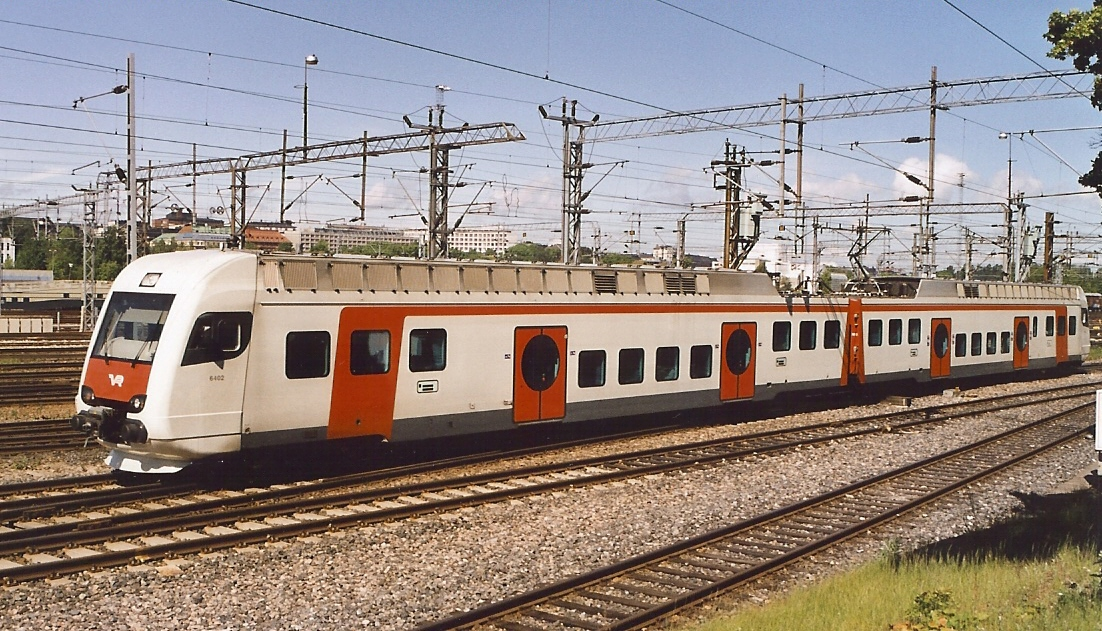
Sm4 train in 2001

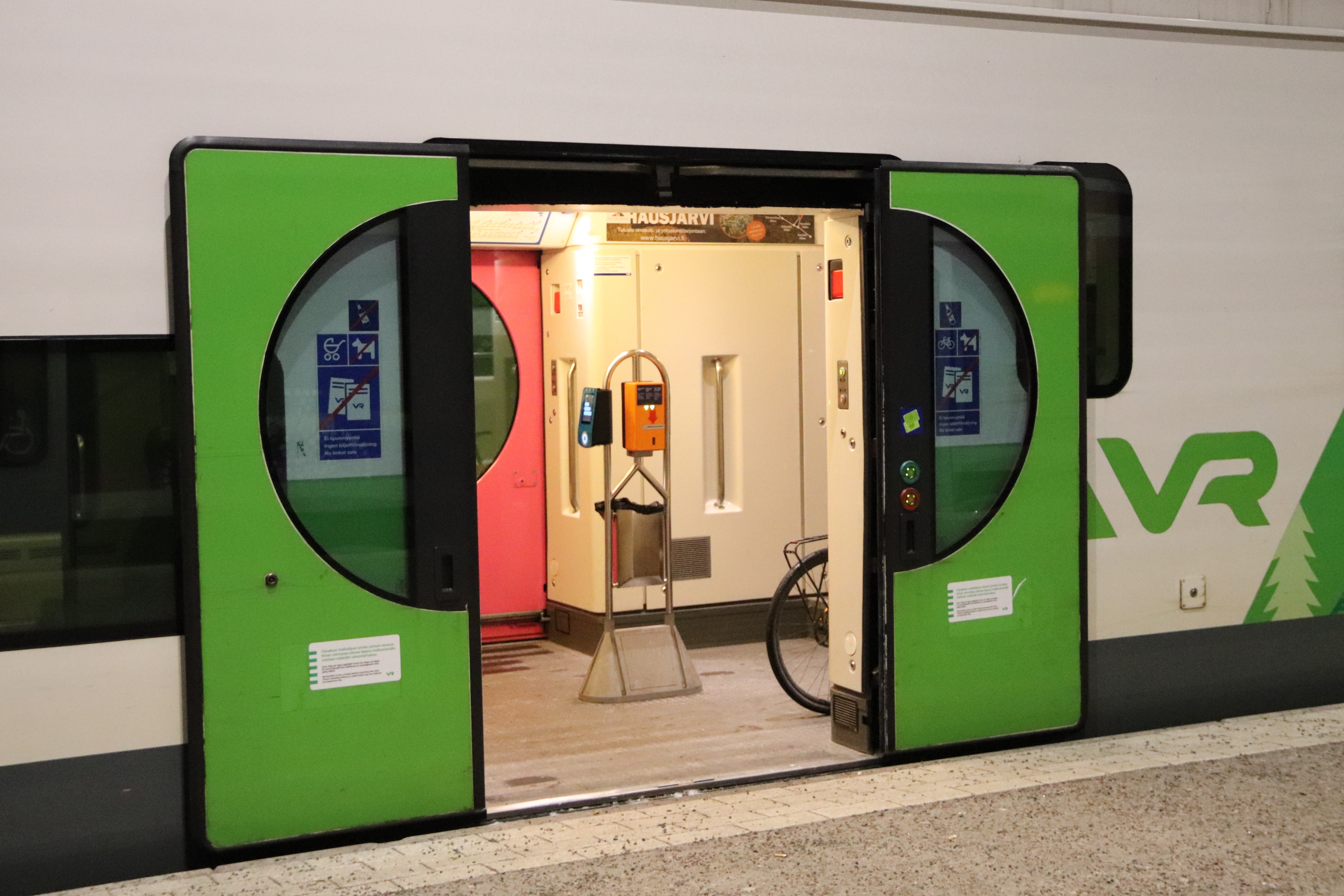
Sm4 entrance
