= SM7 =

SM7 or Sm7 may refer to:

- SM postcode area number 7 in the United Kingdom
- Shure SM7 broadcasting microphone
- VR Class Sm7, a type of train
