= SM5 =

SM5, Sm5, sM5 or sm5 stands for:

- Superman Returns, the fifth Superman film
- JKOY Class Sm5, a type of train operated on the Helsinki commuter rail network
- Renault Samsung SM5, a car produced by Renault Samsung
- SM5 postcode area, the London Borough of Sutton postcode area covering Carshalton, Carshalton Beeches, Carshalton on the Hill, The Wrythe, Carshalton Village, Eastern St. Helier, and Middleton Circle.
- SM-5, one of the computer algorithms used in SuperMemo
- Shure SM5, a precursor to the Shure SM7 microphone
