= Ilmala depot =

Railway depot in Finland

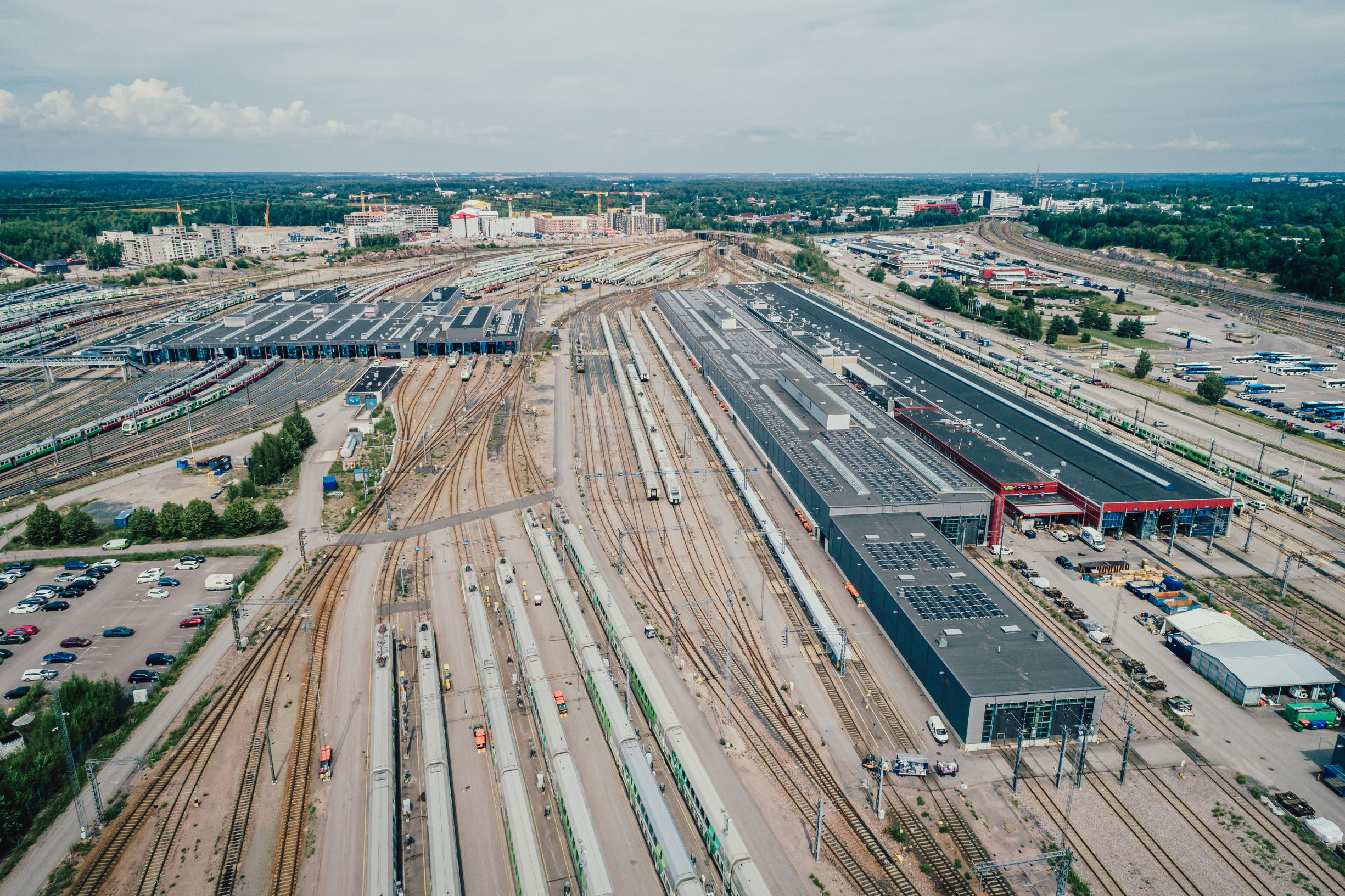
- An aerial view of Ilmala depot and the adjacent bus depot (on the far right).
- Interactive map of Ilmala depot

Location
- Location: Helsinki, Finland
- Coordinates: 60°12′45″N 24°55′33″E

Characteristics
- Owner: VR Group
- Operator: VR Group
- Depot code: ILR
- Type: EMU, locomotive, carriage
- Roads: 202
- Rolling stock: VR Class Sm1, VR Class Sm2, VR Class Sm3, VR Class Sm4, JKOY Class Sm5, VR Class Sm6, VR Class Sr1, VR Class Sr2, VR Class Sr3, InterCity carriages
- Routes served: All VR commuter rail lines and all InterCity and sleeper services.

History
- Opened: June 10, 1980

Ilmala depot (Finnish: Ilmalan varikko) is a railway depot owned and operated by the VR Group in Pohjois-Pasila, Helsinki. It is located to the west of the Posti distribution centre, south of Hakamäentie, east of Veturitie and north of the Postipuisto development area. The entire depot area is roughly 60 hectares (150 acres) in size, and it contains 65 km (40 mi) of rails. Roughly 800 people work in the area. The depot maintains the majority of VR's long-distance rolling stock and all of its commuter rail rolling stock.

== History ==
The depot was built on marshy soil at the turn of the 60s and 70s. The area had previously been used as a shooting range, then as a VR landfill, which later moved to Pasila dumping ground in 1949. During that decade, VR began to draw up plans for a passenger train depot in the area. The landfill was closed in 1963, and work on the depot began in 1967. The first track to be built in the area was the connection to the Helsinki-Turku mainline at Ilmala station.

The year 1970 saw the completion of EMU hall A1. Prior to this, the only EMUs in Finland, the youthful VR Class Sm1 units, were towed by a diesel locomotive to Pasila yard to be serviced. In 1971, EMU hall B1 was completed, in 1975 it was joined by the long-distance train hall, and in 1976 by locomotive hall 1. Maintenance of carriages moved from Helsinki yard to Ilmala when the new carriage halls were finished between 1976 and 1978. DMU hall 1 and diesel locomotive hall 2 were finished in 1979 and 1980, respectively. The depot took 13 years to build, and was finally inaugurated on June 10, 1980.

Since initial completion, the depot has been expanded several times. In 2006 VR and the Finnish Transport Infrastructure Agency started a co-operative project involving the renewal of the interlockings and other safety-critical devices. The depot's tracks, yard lighting and halls were also renovated. In addition, the long-distance train area was expanded, and new service levels were built for both long-distance and commuter trains. The project, which was completed in 2012, cost 185 million euros.

== The depot ==
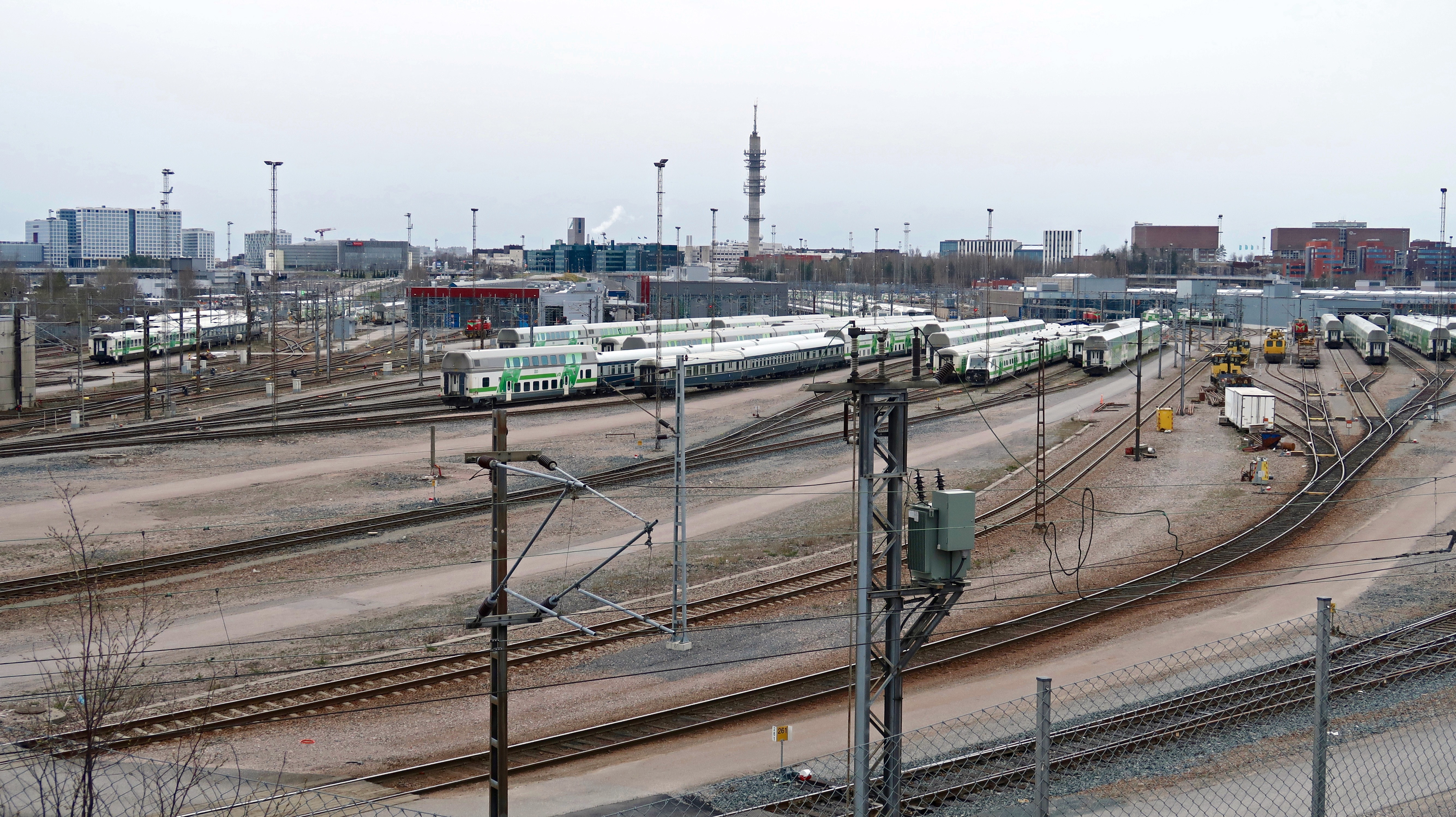
View of the depot taken from the Veturitie bridge, looking south towards Pasila.

The entire depot area is roughly 60 hectares (150 acres) in size, and it contains 65 km (40 mi) of track. The tracks are controlled by an interlocking system, which comprises 210 switches. The depot also contains 5.5 hectares (14 acres)of warm storage halls.

The depot consists of two carriage halls, traction depots, and stabling sidings. The newer hall is designed for the VR Class Sm3 and Sm6 Pendolino units, the latter of which are used solely on the Allegro service to Saint Petersburg. Traction depots are located in the locomotive and commuter train depots. The depot can be accessed from two directions: from the south, via a pair of tracks which diverge from the mainline at Ilmala station; and from the north, via three tracks which diverge at Käpylä station. Below the depot, a service tunnel connects the various halls to a petrol station on Veturitie.

In conjunction with the construction of the Leppävaara city railway, a pair of tracks was built connecting the southern end of the depot to the Helsinki-Turku railway line at Ilmala station. With the help of the Helsinki Kivihaka junction, it is possible to access Ilmala depot from the south from any track at Helsinki station or on the Rantarata mainline.
