= QW Rail Leasing =

QW Rail Leasing is a rolling stock company (ROSCO) formed in 2008 to fund the purchase of rolling stock in the United Kingdom, which would then be leased to train operating companies (TOCs). The company was formed as a joint venture between the National Australia Bank and SMBC Leasing and Finance, with its first major leasing deal coming with Transport for London to fund the £300 million purchase of 57 Class 378 "Capitalstar" electric multiple units for London Overground.

== Trains owned ==
- 57 Class 378 "Capitalstar"
