= VR Class Dm11 =

Class of Cuban diesel multiple unit originally used in Finland

- In service: 1997
- Manufacturer: GEC-Alsthom
- Number built: 6
- Number in service: 0
- Formation: 1 car
- Fleet numbers: 4401–4406
- Capacity: 145 passengers
- Operators: VR Group

Specifications
- Car length: 23,600 mm (77 ft 5 in)
- Width: 3,300 mm (10 ft 10 in)
- Height: 3,900 mm (12 ft 10 in)
- Doors: 3 + 3
- Maximum speed: 120 km/h (75 mph)
- Weight: 46 t (45 long tons; 51 short tons)
- Engine type: Diesel engine
- Power output: 410 kW (550 hp)
- Track gauge: 1,524 mm (5 ft)

The Dm11 was a diesel multiple unit built by GEC-Alsthom in Spain for VR Group. A total of 16 units were ordered in 1995, with an option of 16 more, at a price of 80 million Finnish marks. The first units arrived in Finland in February 1997 and testing started in Central Finland a month later. However, VR cancelled the deal at the end of the same year. By that time, six units had been delivered. The trains left Finland in 1999. One of the units was later seen in Vilnius, Lithuania in 2000 before they were sold to Cuba. The train was unofficially called the Mandolino, which rhymed with the then-new Pendolino.

VR did not accept the Dm11 in regular traffic for multiple reasons. It was claimed to weigh 37.7 tonnes (37.1 long tons; 41.6 short tons) during ordering, but the final units were 9 t (8.9 long tons; 9.9 short tons) overweight. This caused a problem, as the units were expected to run on lower quality tracks. The noise level in the passenger compartments was also measured to be 12 dB louder than expected. Furthermore, the windows of the train froze during winter service. The black ends of the train were seen as a hazard for drivers, and yellow was added to the nose of unit 4401 to increase visibility.

VR started a new tender in December 1997, asking for 12–20 trains and a maximum of 20 options. However, the winner of the bid could not deliver trains that fitted the specifications, which meant that VR had to start from scratch once again at the end of the year 1998. Only three bids were entered, none of which interested the company. It started a new tender at the end of the year 1999 with the same requirements. Finally, CKD Vagonka (later Škoda Vagonka) won the bid in 2001 with a DMU that was to be called the Dm12. The unit numbers of the Dm11 (4401 to 4406) were reused on Dm12 trains.
