= VR Class Sm2 =

Class of Finnish electric multiple unit

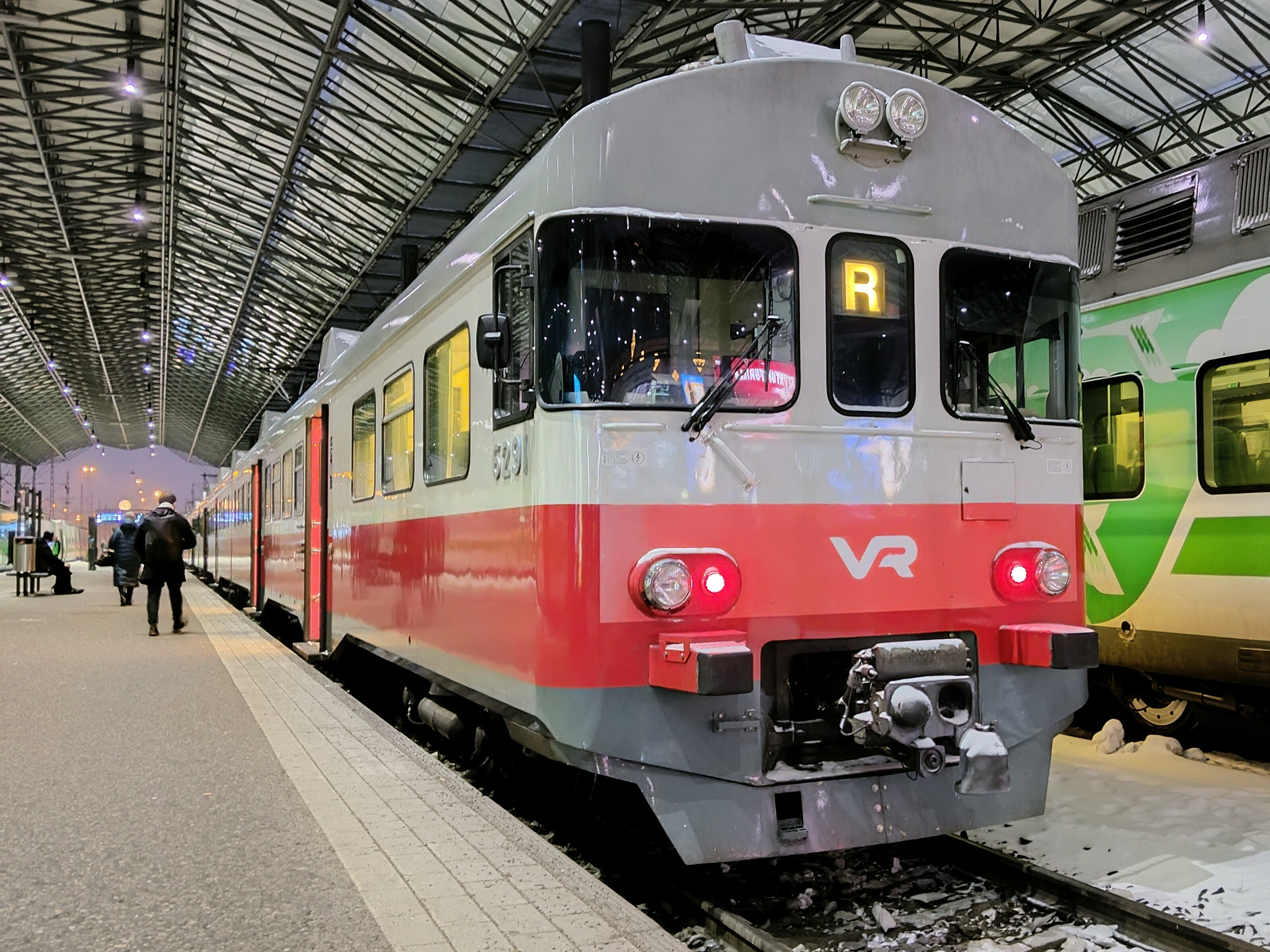
- An Sm2 unit at Helsinki.

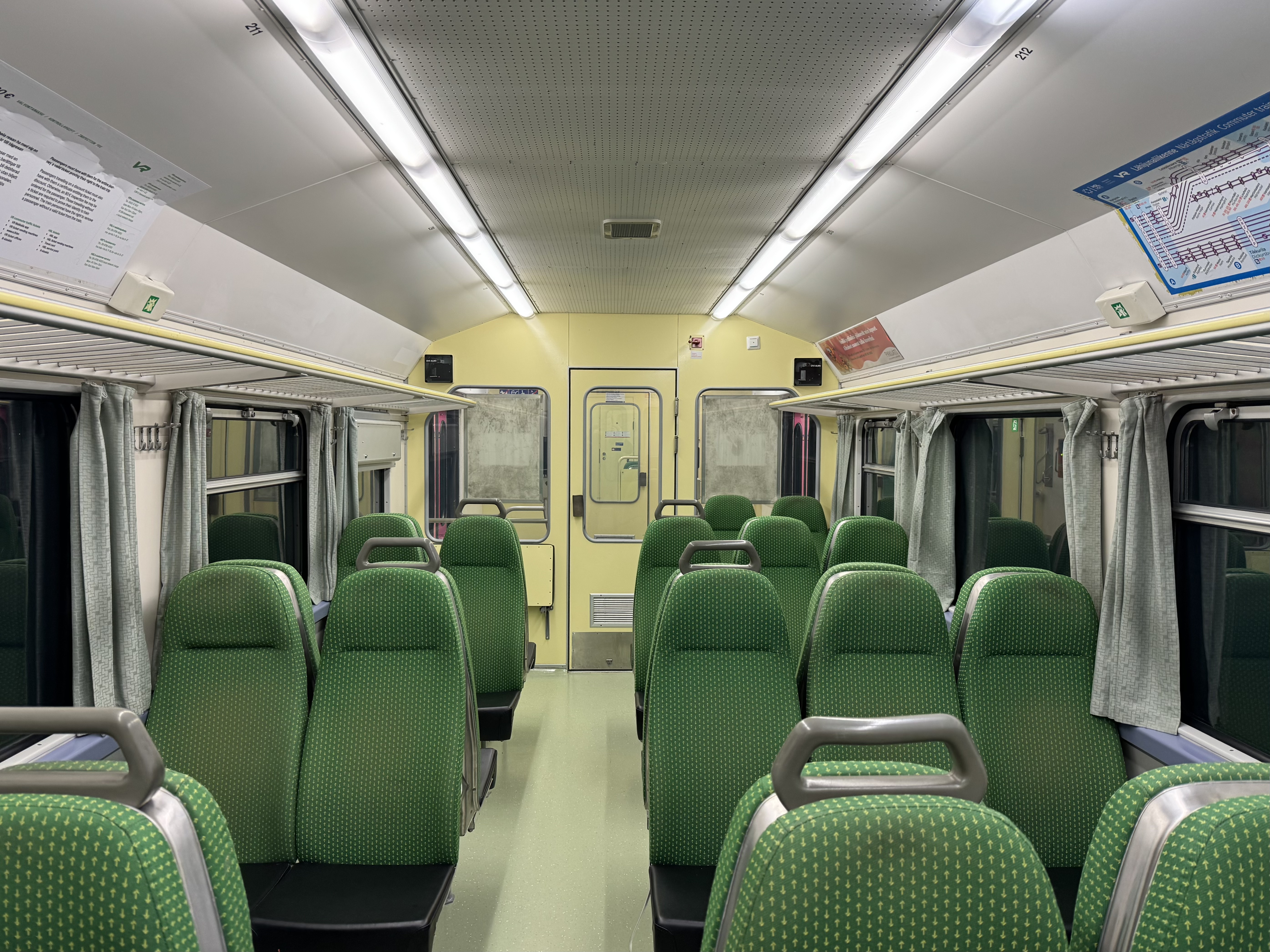
- Refurbished Sm2 interior
- Manufacturers: Valmet, Strömberg
- Built at: Tampere, Finland
- Constructed: 1975–1981
- Entered service: 1975–
- Refurbished: 2002–2011; 2019–2024
- Scrapped: 2025-
- Number built: 50
- Number in service: 34
- Number scrapped: 5
- Fleet numbers: 6051+6251 – 6100+6300
- Capacity: 200 passengers
- Operator: VR Group
- Depot: Ilmala depot
- Lines served: VR commuter rail lines M, G, O, R & Z

Specifications
- Train length: 53,250 mm (174 ft 8 in)
- Car length: 26,625 mm (87 ft 4.2 in)
- Maximum speed: 120 km/h (75 mph)
- Weight: 46.5 t (45.8 long tons; 51.3 short tons) (Sm2); 76.0 t (74.8 long tons; 83.8 short tons) (Sm2+Eioc)
- Axle load: 15.9 t (15.6 long tons; 17.5 short tons)
- Prime mover: Strömberg GHAU H7226
- Power output: 4x155 kW (208 hp)
- Safety system: ATP-VR/RHK
- Multiple working: Sm1
- Track gauge: 1,524 mm (5 ft)

The Sm2 is a class of electric multiple units in use by VR in its commuter rail traffic in southern Finland. Fifty Sm2 units were built between 1975 and 1981 by Valmet in Tampere. Since the withdrawal of the older Sm1 units, the Sm2 units are the oldest multiple units in use in Finland.

All Sm2 units were completely renovated between 2002 and 2011. Only the bodywork and the technics remained mostly untouched. Many of the changes are visible to the passengers, including a different type of seat and modern toilets. Between 2019 and 2024, all remaining operational units were refreshed, with new moquette and a new livery consisting of a white bodyside with a green lower band, except for units 73, 90 and 91, which remains in their vintage red livery.

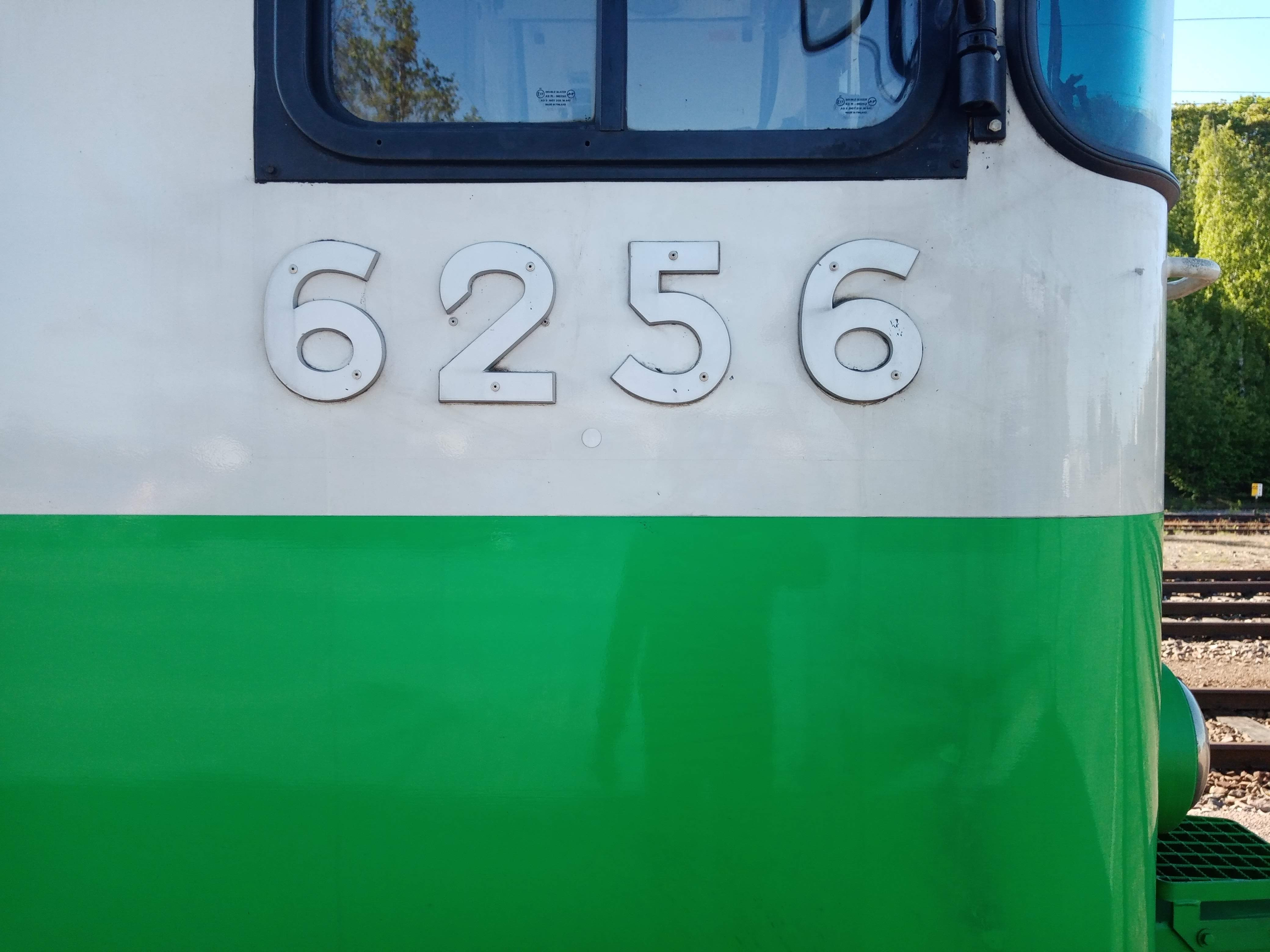
Close-up of the number plate of Eioc trailer No. 6256, seen at Kotka Port in June 2022. This unit, like most nowadays, carries the newer white livery with green lower bodyside band.

== Technical information ==
Like the Sm1, each Sm2 unit consists of two cars: the Sm2 is the motored car of the multiple unit, while the other car, the driving trailer, is a part of the Eioc class.

The units are numbered from 51 to 00. The individual carriages are 6051 to 6100 for the Sm2 motor car and 6251 to 6300 for the Eioc driving trailer.

The train can be driven from both ends, which is a major advantage compared to locomotive-pulled trains in commuter traffic. Sm2s can be coupled together with Sm1s forming trains of at most six units (12 cars), but the length of the commuter train platforms limits the maximum length to five in commercial traffic. The full length trains can be seen in depot traffic in the morning and evening. The units use Scharfenberg couplers.

The Sm2 is technically very similar to the older Sm1 EMU, although there are also some differences, such as the Sm1 having steel spring suspension and strengthening creases on the sides. The bodywork is also made of aluminium, as opposed to steel in the Sm1.

The maximum speed of the unit is 120 km/h (75 mph). The electric systems were developed and built by Strömberg at their plant in Pitäjänmäki, Helsinki.

== Use ==
=== Current ===
Since the arrival of the final batch Sm5 units in 2017, Sm2 units have not been used on HSL commuter rail services. Instead they are used among Sm4 units on VR's commuter rail routes.

As of 2023, the units are used individually on G, M and O trains and in multiple on peak time R and Z trains. Currently, 39 of the original 50 units are still with VR, of which 3 are used as spares donors.

=== Future ===
The Sm2 units are approaching 50 years of age, and despite refurbishments, they are slower than the Sm4 units which displaced them from the busier routes. VR has ordered 20 new 4-car Sm7 units from Stadler. These new units will displace slower Sm4 units onto regional routes, which will in turn replace Sm2 units from VR service. The new sets are due to enter service in 2026.

In September 2022, VR sold 11 units already removed from service to private company Suomen Lähijunat Oy, which plans to overhaul the ageing units and put them back into use on new commuter routes in the Turku region.

In September 2025, Suomen Lähijunat announced that due to vandalism, it will sell the bought Sm2 units from VR for scrap, and will instead order newer used units from Europe. As of September 2025, at least two units have already been scrapped. In February 2026 another two units have been scrapped and one unit have been scrapped in April 2026.
