= JKOY Class Sm5 =

Class of Finnish electric multiple unit

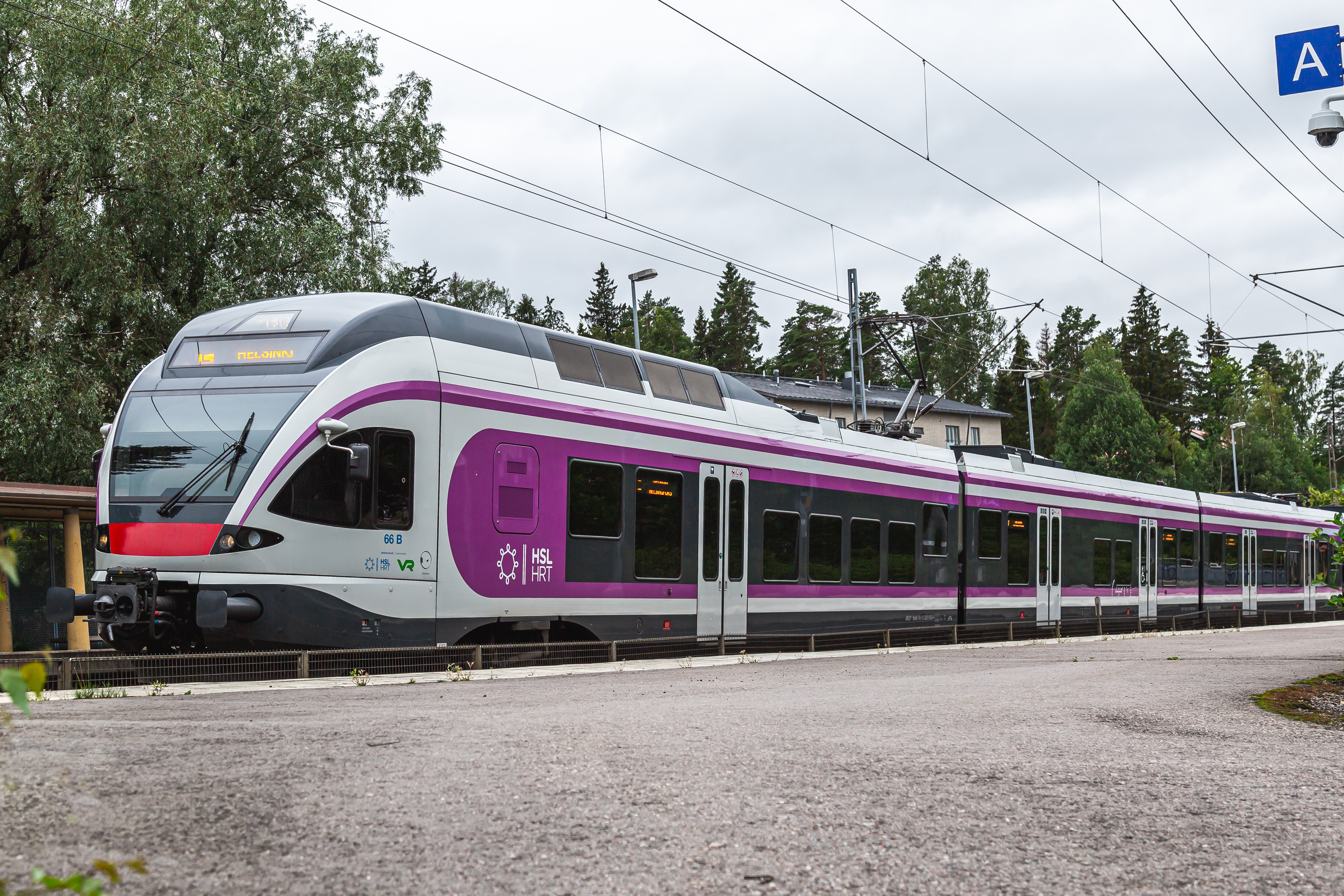
- Sm5 unit at Tuomarila railway station.

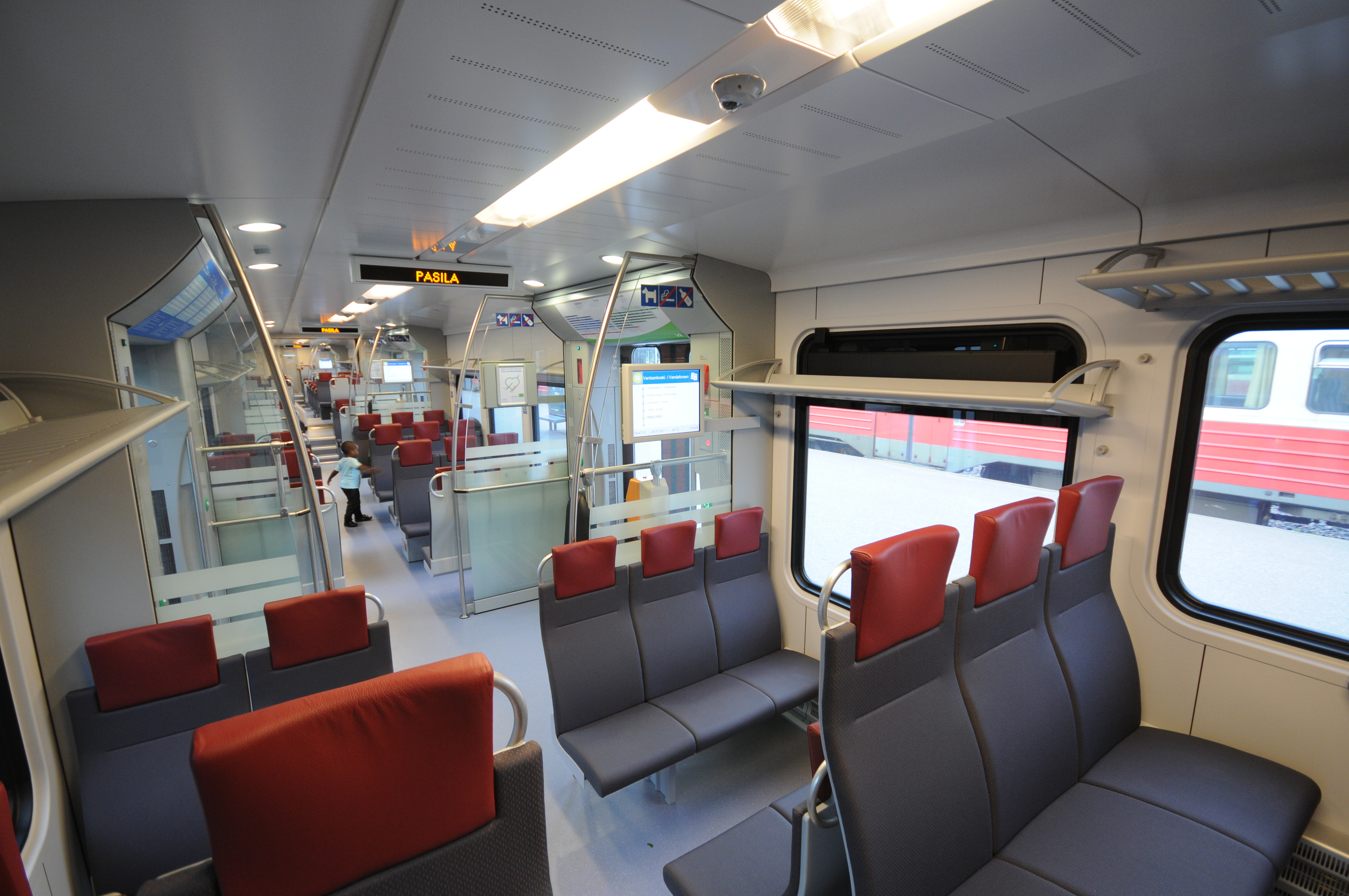
- The interior of an Sm5 unit.
- In service: 2009–
- Manufacturer: Stadler Rail
- Built at: Bussnang, Switzerland
- Family name: FLIRT
- Replaced: Sm1, Sm2
- Constructed: 2008–2017
- Number built: 81
- Number in service: 81
- Formation: 4-car sets
- Fleet numbers: 94 10 2081 001–081
- Capacity: 583
- Operator: VR Group
- Depot: Ilmala
- Line served: All Helsinki commuter rail lines

Specifications
- Car body construction: Aluminium
- Train length: 75.2 m (246 ft 9 in)
- Width: 3.2 m (10 ft 6 in)
- Height: 4.4 m (14 ft 5 in)
- Floor height: 600 mm (24 in)
- Low-floor: 70%
- Platform height: 550 mm (22 in)
- Doors: 1 pair of plug doors per motor car; 2 pairs of plug doors per trailer car
- Wheel diameter: 870 mm (34 in) (motorised bogies, new); 800 mm (31 in) (trailer bogies, new)
- Wheelbase: 2,700 mm (8 ft 10 in) (motorised bogies); 2,750 mm (9 ft 0 in) (trailer bogies)
- Maximum speed: 160 km/h (100 mph)
- Weight: 132 t (130 long tons; 146 short tons)
- Axle load: 20.5 t (20.2 long tons; 22.6 short tons) (motorised bogies); 20.5 t (20.2 long tons; 22.6 short tons) (trailer bogies)
- Traction system: ABB BORDLINE CC750 IGBT–VVVF
- Traction motors: 4 × TSA TMF 59-39-4 500 kW (670 hp)
- Power output: 2,000 kW (2,700 hp)
- Transmission: Voith SZH-595 gearbox
- Acceleration: 1.2 m/s^{2} (3.9 ft/s^{2})
- Electric system: 25 kV 50 Hz AC catenary
- Current collection: Pantograph
- UIC classification: Bo′2′2′2′Bo′
- Safety system: ATP-VR/RHK
- Coupling system: Scharfenberg
- Track gauge: 1,524 mm (5 ft)

Notes/references
- Sourced from except where noted.

The Sm5 electric multiple unit (EMU) is a low-floor train used on the Helsinki commuter rail network. Unlike other train types on the network, the Sm5 units are owned by Pääkaupunkiseudun Junakalusto Oy, a subsidiary of the cities of Helsinki, Espoo, Vantaa and Kauniainen. The units are leased to the Helsinki Regional Transport Authority (HSL), and VR operates them.

== History ==
Junakalusto Oy ordered 32 Stadler Flirt EMUs from Stadler Rail in 2006. The first two were delivered in November 2008 and 2009. The units were put through extensive testing on the Finnish rail network before the first unit entered commercial service in November 2009. As of July 2012, seventeen units have been delivered, all of them being in service. Nine more trainsets were ordered in October 2011 and 34 further units in 2014, raising the total to 75.

The Sm5 units are designed for the Finnish winter conditions. They are fitted with 50–100% thicker thermal insulation compared to previous FLIRT models, and the incoming fresh ventilation air is preheated with the outgoing warm air to recover heat. The entrance areas are fitted with fan heaters in order to preserve the interior climate as passengers enter and leave during cold weather.

The Sm5 unit is mostly low-floor with all entrances level with the station platforms. The interior space is open through the articulations so that passengers can walk through all the four cars from end to end. This allows passengers to easily occupy the cars evenly. The wide Finnish loading gauge allows the cars to be wider than most European railway cars. This allows a 2+3 seating configuration in the commuter trains, but still with comfortable spacing.

The Sm5 series is planned to replace the two oldest electric multiple unit series in the Helsinki commuter traffic, the Sm1 and Sm2. The Sm5 are also used for the airport rail service, the Ring Rail Line connecting the Helsinki-Vantaa airport to the rail network, operated since July 2015. At the same time HSL repainted the trains in a distinctive purple to differentiate the capital region commuter trains from the outer suburban services to places like Riihimäki.

The trains are transported from the Swiss factory by road and ferry, since they cannot run on European standard gauge railways.
