= Railstock Finland =

Finnish rolling stock leasing company

Railstock Finland Oy
- Company type: State-owned
- Industry: Rolling stock leasing
- Founded: 2024; 2 years ago
- Headquarters: Helsinki, Finland
- Owner: Government of Finland
- Website: railstock.fi/en

Railstock Finland, initially branded as Suomen Ostoliikennekalusto, is a Finnish state-owned railway rolling stock leasing company. The company was founded as a subsidiary of the national railway operator VR Group and transferred to direct state ownership in November 2025. The company will take over ownership of rolling stock used on public service obligation routes, in order to make rolling stock compatible with Finland's 1,524 mm (5 ft) broad gauge rail network available for other bidders when the current contract with VR expires at the end of 2030.

In February 2026, the company agreed to purchase VR commuter rail rolling stock, as well as VR's sleeping cars, car-carrier wagons and railbuses, for €250 million. Locomotives used for night trains are excluded from the transfer, as is long-distance InterCity and Sm3 Pendolino rolling stock currently used for public service obligation routes between Kuopio and Oulu.

== See also ==
- Rail transport in Finland
