= VR Class Sm1 =

Withdrawn class of Finnish electric multiple unit

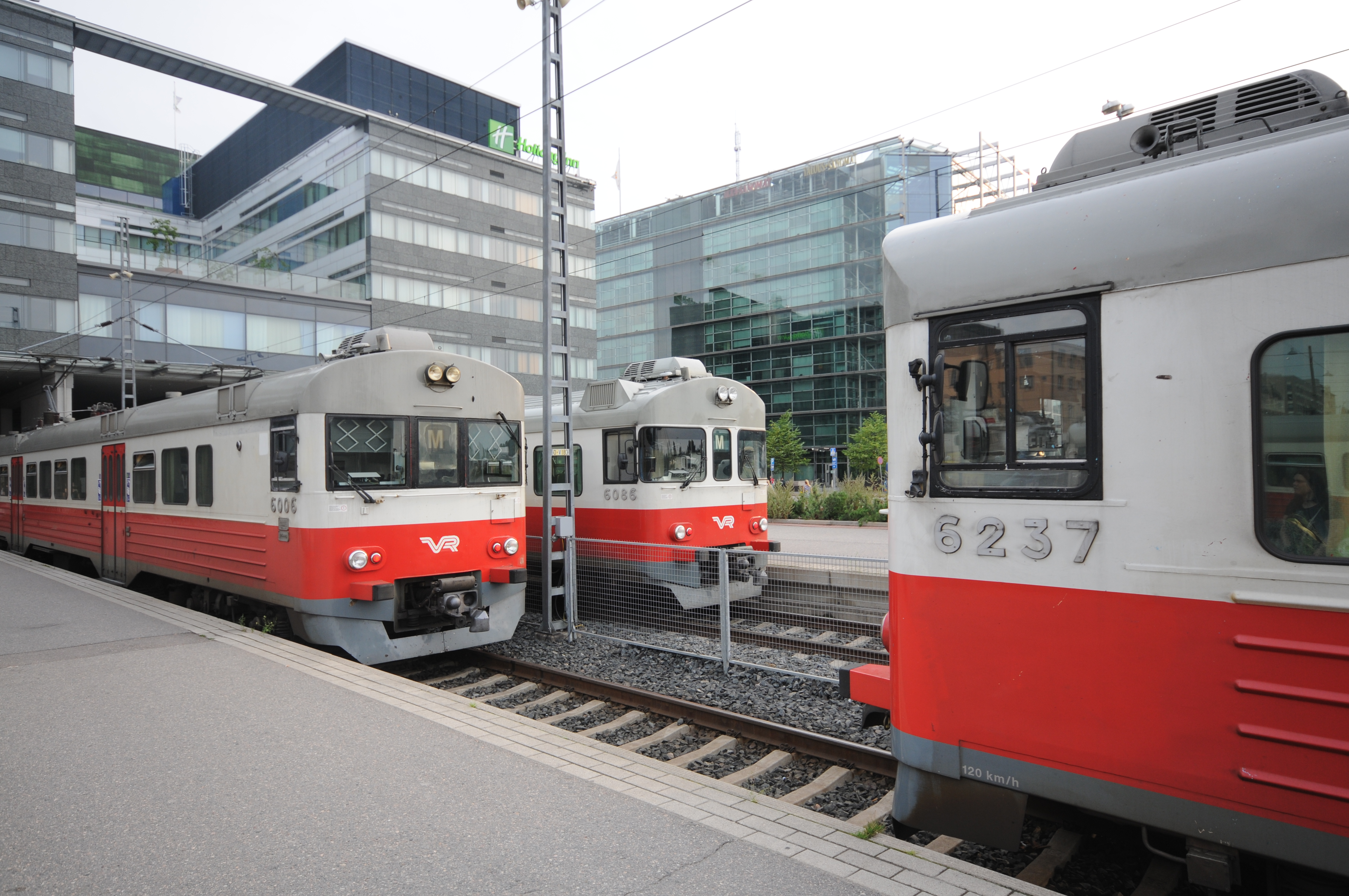
- Two Sm1 units at Helsinki central railway station. The one at the background, 6086, is of the newer Sm2 class.

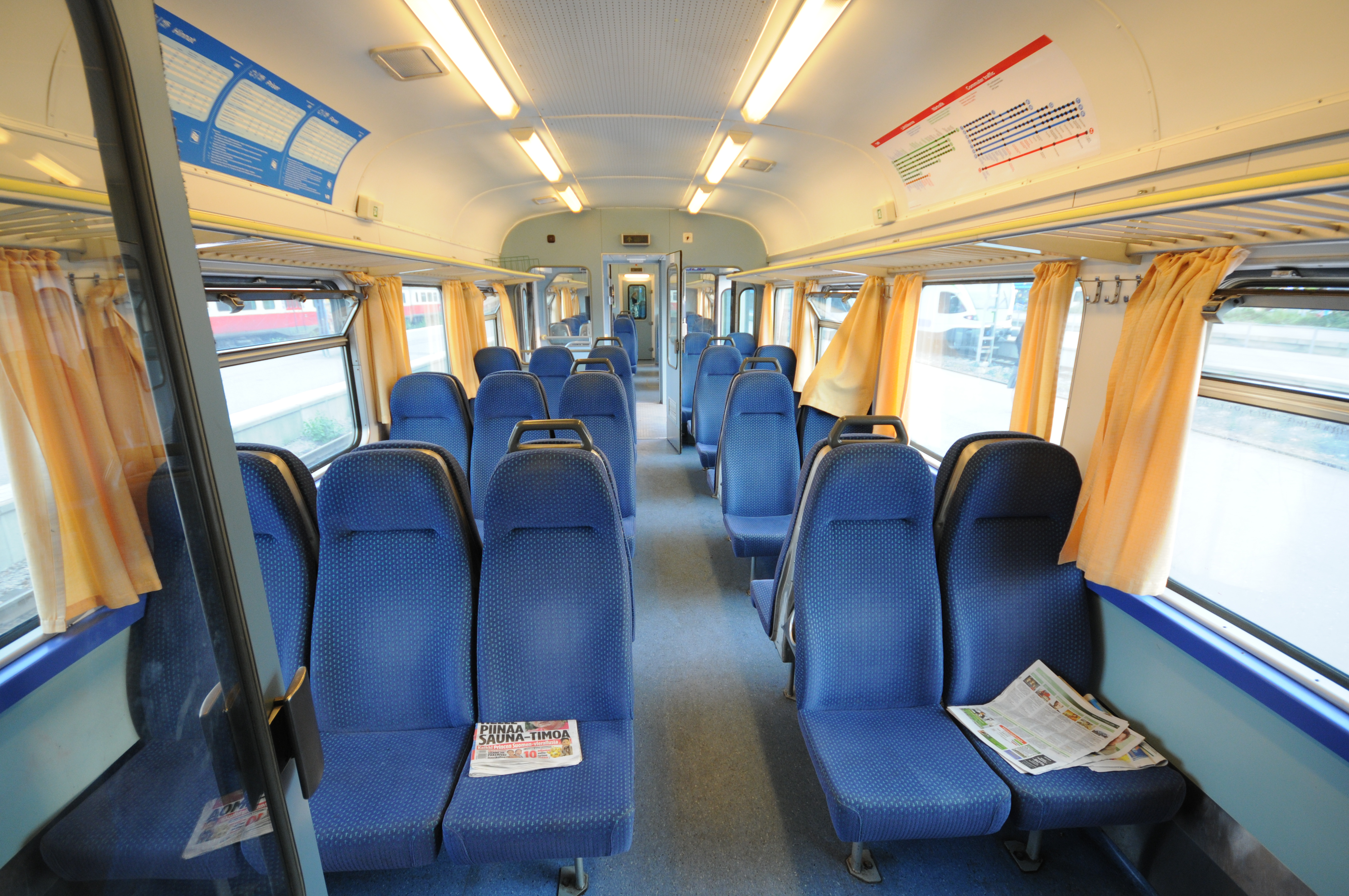
- The refurbished interior of an Sm1.
- In service: 26 January 1969 – 9 April 2016
- Manufacturers: Valmet, Strömberg
- Built at: Tampere, Finland
- Constructed: 1968–1973
- Refurbished: 1994–2000
- Number built: 50
- Number in service: 0
- Number preserved: 2
- Number scrapped: 48
- Fleet numbers: 6001+6201 – 6050+6250
- Capacity: 191 passengers
- Operator: VR Group
- Line served: Helsinki commuter rail

Specifications
- Train length: 53.25 m (174 ft 8 in)
- Car length: 26,625 mm (87 ft 4.2 in)
- Maximum speed: 120 km/h (75 mph)
- Weight: 58.6 t (57.7 long tons; 64.6 short tons) (Sm1); 35.6 t (35.0 long tons; 39.2 short tons) (Eiob)
- Axle load: 18.8 t (18.5 long tons; 20.7 short tons)
- Prime mover: Strömberg GHAU H7226
- Power output: 4 × 215 kW (288 hp)
- Safety system: ATP-VR/RHK
- Track gauge: 1524 mm

The electric multiple unit Sm1 is a class of commuter train equipment that was in active use by VR from 1969–2016. Fifty Sm1 units were built between 1968 and 1973 at Valmet airplane factory in Tampere. They were put into use on the first electrified Finnish railway line between Helsinki and Kirkkonummi on January 26, 1969 with five units in operation. All Sm1s were thoroughly renovated between 1994 and 2000. Commercial service ended in April 2016.

== Technical information ==
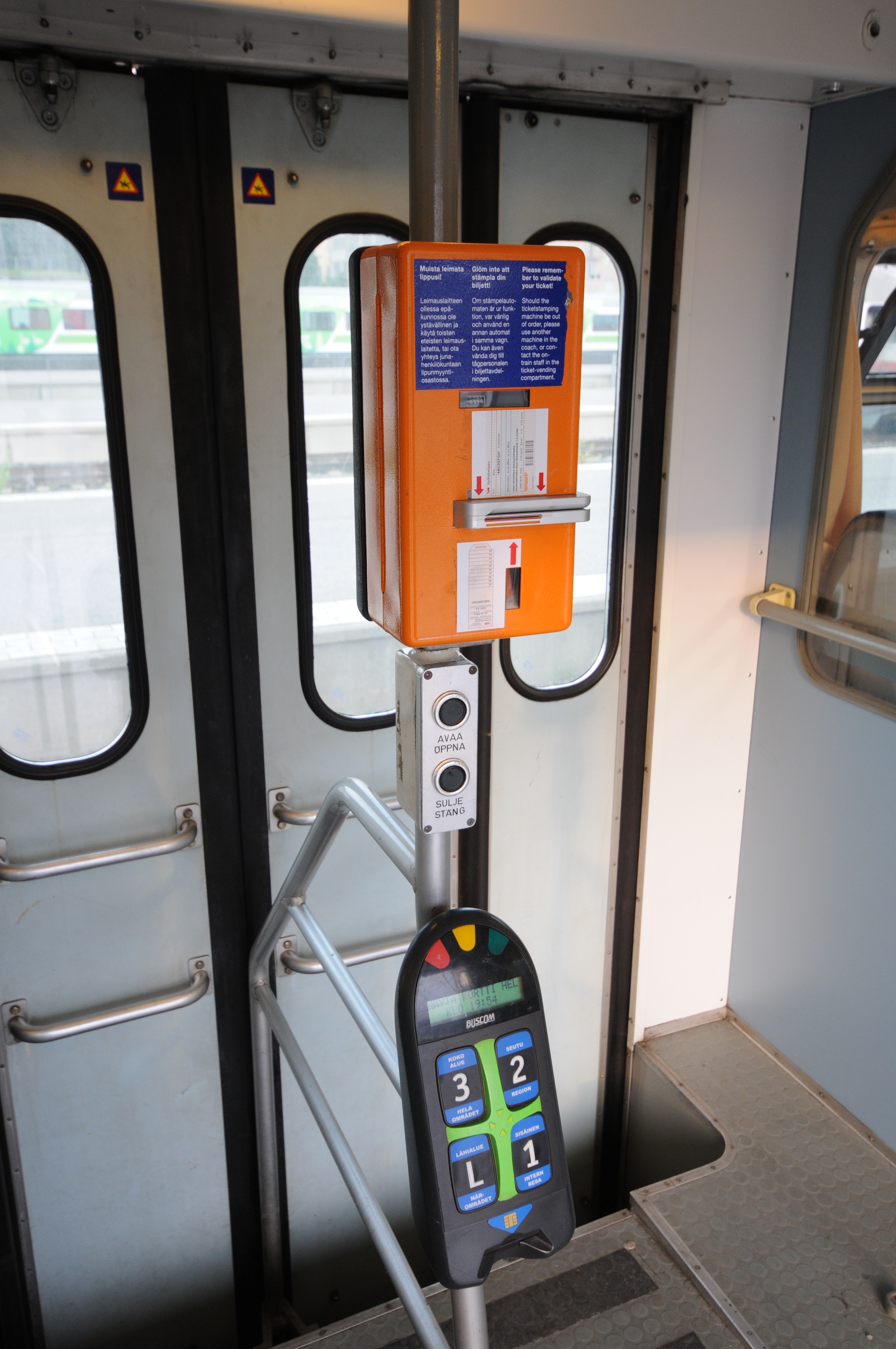
VR (above) and HSL/HRT (below) ticket stamping devices

Each Sm1 unit consists of two cars: the Sm1 is the motored car of the multiple unit, while the other car, the driving trailer, is a part of the Eio class. There is a driver's cabin at either end of the unit. This is a major advantage compared to locomotive-pulled trains in commuter traffic. The two-car unit has 191 seats combined, including fourteen foldable seats.

Six Sm1 units can be coupled together in total, but the length of the commuter train platforms limits the maximum length to five in commercial traffic. Six unit trains can be seen in depot traffic between Helsinki Central Station and Ilmala depot. The units use Scharfenberg couplers.

The maximum speed of the Sm1 is 120 km/h (75 mph). The electric systems were developed and built by Strömberg at their plant in Pitäjänmäki, Helsinki.

The Sm1 is technically very similar to the newer Sm2 EMU, although there are also some differences, such as the Sm1 having steel spring suspension and strengthening creases on the sides.

The units are numbered between 6001 and 6050 for the Sm1 car and 6201 and 6250 for the Eioc driving trailer.

== See also ==
- VR Class Sm2
