= Rolling stock company =

Company owning railway engines and carriages

A rolling stock company (ROSCO) or rolling stock leasing company owns and maintains railway engines and carriages which are leased to train operators or train operating companies.

Rolling stock companies have been criticised as extractive, in that they add little value to the end product compared to direct ownership of the trains by the train operating companies, and extract profits from what were once in many cases government-owned and government-financed assets. However, the arrangement removes the need for the train operating companies to raise capital to purchase the rolling stock.

== Africa ==
- Sheltam Grindrod
- Swifambo Rail Leasing

== Australia ==
- Rail First Asset Management

== Canada ==
- Bombardier Transportation (Sold to Alstom SA in 2021)

== Europe ==
- Alpha Trains
- Alstom
- Macquarie European Rail
- Suomen Ostoliikennekalusto
- Transitio

=== United Kingdom ===
ROSCOs began to be used when British Rail was privatised, beginning in 1994.

- Angel Trains
- Beacon Rail
- Europhoenix
- Eversholt Rail Group
- Nemesis Rail
- Porterbrook
- QW Rail Leasing
- Rock Rail
- Sovereign Trains
- Tiphook
- UK Rail Leasing

== United States ==
- Chicago Freight Car Leasing Company (CFCL)
